= Jagannath Temple (disambiguation) =

The Jagannath Temple is a temple dedicated to the Hindu god Jagannath.

Jagannath Temple may also refer to:

== India ==
- Jagannath Temple, Ahmedabad, Gujarat
- Jagannath Temple, Alwar, Rajasthan
- Jagannath Temple, Bangalore, Karnataka
- Jagannath Temple, Baripada, Mayurbhanj, Odisha
- Jagannath Temple, Chennai, Tamil Nadu
- Jagannath Temple, Dibrugarh, Assam
- Jagannath Temple, Kanyakumari, Tamil Nadu
- Jagannath Temple, Delhi
- Jagannath Temple, Dharakote, Odisha
- Jagannath Temple, Digha, West Bengal
- Jagannath Temple, Gunupur, Odisha
- Jagannath Temple, Hyderabad
- Jagannath Temple, Koraput, Odisha
- Jagannath Temple, Mohanpur, West Bengal
- Jagannath Temple, Nayagarh, Odisha
- Jagannath Temple, Puri, Odisha
- Jagannath Temple, Ranchi, Jharkhand
- Jagannath Temple, Rayagada, Odisha
- Jagannath Temple, Thalassery, Kerala
- Chhatia Bata, Jajpur, Odisha
- Jagannath Temple, Surada, Odisha

== Elsewhere ==
- Shri Jagannath Puri Temple, Inanda, KwaZulu-Natal, South Africa
- Comilla Jagannath Temple, Comilla, Bangladesh
- Jagannath Temple, Pabna, Bangladesh
- Jagannath Temple, Sialkot, Pakistan

== See also ==
- Category:Jagannath temples
- Jagannath (disambiguation)
- Juggernaut (disambiguation)
