= Agartala Jagannath Mandir =

Hindu temple in Tripura, India

- Location in Tripura Agartala Jagannath Mandir (India)

Religion
- Affiliation: Hinduism
- District: West Tripura
- Deity: Jagannath, Balabhadra and Subhadra

Location
- Location: Agartala
- State: Tripura
- Country: India
- Coordinates: 23.8362757°N 91.2798885°E

Architecture
- Architect: Manikya Dynasty
- Established: 19th century

Jagannath Temple is a Hindu temple located within the Ujjayanta Palace grounds in Agartala, Tripura, India. Built by the Maharaja of Tripura of the Manikya Dynasty in the 19th century, the Jagannath temple is situated in the Ujjayanta Palace grounds and is dedicated to the Hindu Gods Jagannath, Balabhadra and Subhadra.

== History ==
Built in the 19th century by then Maharaja of Tripura, Maharaja Radha Kishore Manikya, this temple with an octagonal base has four stories. The temple is adorned with bright orange stepped up Shikharas

== Architecture ==
The Jagannath Temple is known for a unique, blended design. Its base and pillars are octagonal in shape leading to a four-story tower. This architectural style mixes traditional Hindu, Buddhist and Islamic designs into one distinct look called "Tripura style". The Base of the structure is shaped like an octagon, providing a walking path around the main worship area. The Pillars on the outside of the temple are decorated with unique, pyramid-shaped cones. The Spire on top rises four stories high and is famous for its vibrant orange color and stepped pyramid design.

== Festival ==
The biggest event at the temple is the Ratha Yatra. While older Ratha Yatra traditions exist in Udaipur, the Agartala temple is now the main place for these celebrations. The festival remembers the journey of Lord Jagannath and his siblings, Balabhadra and Subhadra. This tradition likely came from Orissa. During the celebration, deities are placed on a large chariot and pulled by crowds of people. These festivals are more than just religious events, they bring many different types of people together. It helps different social and ethnic groups in Tripura connect with each other. Which reflects a strong sense of local unity.

== See also ==
- Hinduism
- Tripura Sundari Temple
- List of Hindu temples in India
- List of Jagannath Temples outside Puri
