= Jagannath Temple, Angul =

Hindu pilgrimage site in Angul, Odisha, India

Saila Srikhetra Temple
- ଶୈଳ ଶ୍ରୀକ୍ଷେତ୍ର
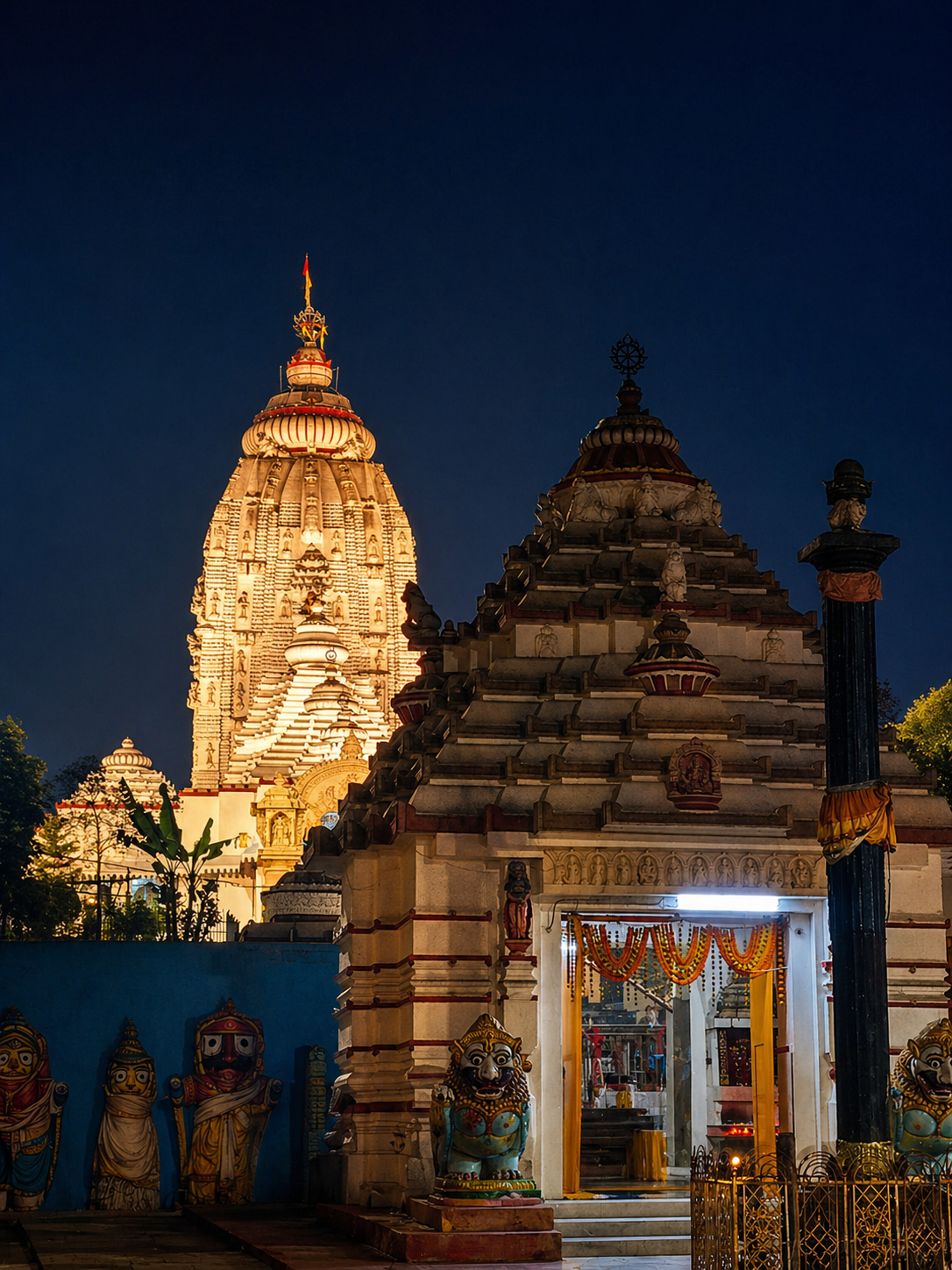
- Saila Srikhetra Temple in Angul

- Location in Odisha, India

Religion
- Affiliation: Hinduism
- District: Angul district
- Deity: Jagannath; Balabhadra; Subhadra
- Festivals: Ratha Yatra; Snana Yatra

Location
- Location: Angul
- State: Odisha
- Country: India
- Coordinates: 20.8440°N 85.1515°E

Saila Srikhetra is a local Hindu temple site located in the district of Angul in the state of Odisha. It is a regional spiritual center where people worship Jagannath, similar to how people worship at the Jagannath Temple in Puri.

== See also ==
- Jagannath Temple, Puri
- Ratha Yatra
- List of Jagannath Temples outside Puri
