= List of Jagannath temples outside Puri =

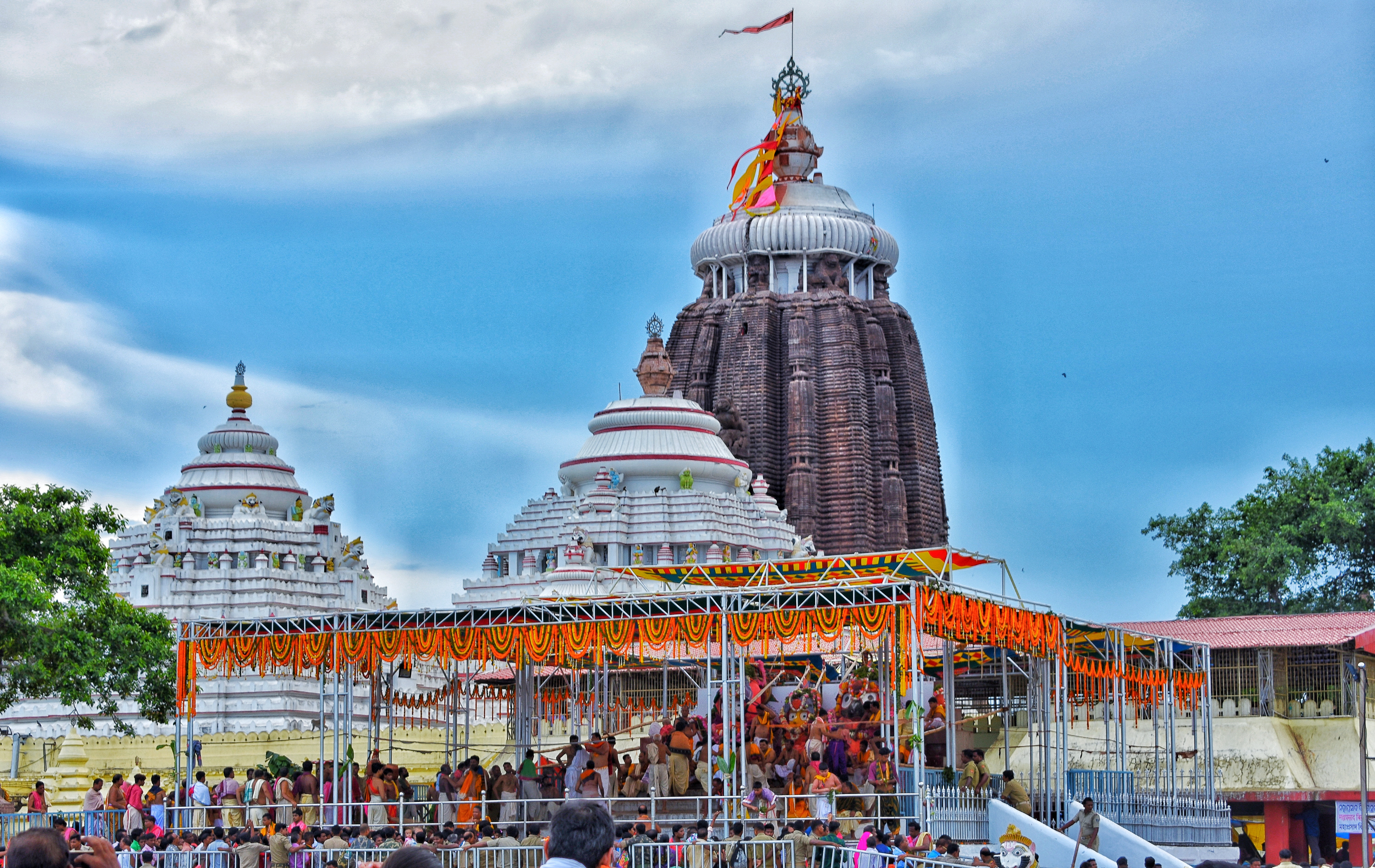
The Jagannath Temple, Puri, the principal shrine of Lord Jagannath and one of the Char Dham pilgrimage sites in India

The List of Jagannath temples outside Puri includes Hindu temples dedicated to Jagannath, a form of Vishnu worshipped mostly in Odisha. The Jagannath Temple, Puri is still the most important shrine and a major place for pilgrims to visit. However, there are now many other temples in India and other countries that are dedicated to Jagannath.

Many of these temples are connected to Odia diaspora communities and hold ceremonies like the yearly Ratha Yatra.

== India ==
Photo	Name	Location	State	Notes
	Saila Srikhetra	Angul	Odisha	
	Dharakot Jagannath Mandir	Ganjam	Odisha	Built in modern Kalinga style, like the Jagannath Temple in Puri. People in the area know it for its Ekadasi Cart festival.
	Jagannath Mandir, Badahra Mahant	Maharajganj	Uttar Pradesh	Considered essential because deity's watch is built there after having a dream.
	Chhatia Jagannath Temple	Jajpur	Odisha	Dedicated to Jagannath and connected to Kalki, the avatar of Vishnu.
	Jagannath Mandir, Agartala	Agartala	Tripura	The temple, which was built in the 1800s, is on the grounds of the Ujjayanta Palace and is dedicated to the Hindu gods Jagannath, Balabhadra, and Subhadra.
	Sradhha Shrikhetra, Rayagada	Rayagada	Odisha	More than 50 years ago, the temple was first built. The temple's main gods are Lord Jagannath, Balabhadra, and Subhadra. In 2007, the temple was rebuilt with a new look. On June 20, 2007, the Gajapati Raja of Puri came to the opening ceremony of the new Temple.
	Jagannath Temple, Nayagarh	Nayagarh	Odisha	Rebuilt in 1972, the temple is in Pancharatha Rekha Deula style.
	Shabara Shrikshetra	Koraput	Odisha	This temple follows the idea that everyone should be treated equally, regardless of caste, gender, or religion. Therefore, the entry to the temple is accessible by everyone regardless of their gender, caste, and religion.
	Jagannath Temple, Gunupur	Raygada	Odisha	It was an old temple built by the Maharaja Vikramadeb of Jeypore over a hundred years ago. The present structure of the temple with new look has been constructed in the year 1997.
	Digha Jagannath Dham	Purba Medinipur	West Bengal	It was built to look like the Jagannath Temple in Puri, Odisha, and it was opened on April 30, 2025, after a prana pratishtha (consecration) ceremony.
	Srikshetra Dham	Dibrugarh	Assam	The temple, built in 2014, is a replica of the second form of the original Jagannath Temple at Puri.
	Jagannath Temple, Hyderabad	Hyderabad	Telangana	Famous for its yearly Rathyatra festival attended by thousands of devotees.
	Jagannath Temple, Ahmedabad	Ahmedabad	Gujarat	Noted for its annual chariot festival, Rath Yatra, which is the third most important and largest after the Ratha Yatra at Puri.
	Jagannath Temple, Bengaluru	Bengaluru	Karnataka	Its main festival is the annual Rath Yatra, attended by more than 15,000 devotees.
	Jagannath Temple, Delhi	Delhi	Delhi	Located in Hauz Khas, which is known for its annual Rathyatra festival, and draws thousands of devotees.
	Jagannath Temple, Varanasi	Varanasi	Uttar Pradesh	
	Jagannath Temple, Alwar	Alwar	Rajasthan	Known for its annual Rath Yatra festival, when Lord Jagannath is carried in a chariot called Indra Vimana. The chariot, which used to be an elephant carriage, was given to the temple by the former Maharaja of Alwar to be used for the Rath yatra. The Rath Yatra festival has its own customs and traditions that are different from those of Puri.
	Jagannath Temple, Raigarh	Raigarh	Chhattisgarh	
	Jagannath Temple, Khallari	Mahasamund district	Chhattisgarh	
	Jagannath Temple, Bharuch	Bharuch	Gujarat	
	Jagannath Temple, Ranchi	Ranchi (Hatia)	Jharkhand	The Mughal Emperor Aurangzeb desecrated and vandalized it in 1691. The temple fell down on August 6, 1990, and it was rebuilt on February 8, 1992.

== Outside India ==
Name	Location	Country	Notes
Jagannath Temple	Fremont, California	United States	In 1994, members of the Odia American community from the Bay Area laid the groundwork for California's first Jagannath temple at the Fremont Hindu Temple (Vedic Dharma Samaj).
Jagannath Temple	Chicago, Illinois	United States	
Jagannath Temple	New York	United States	
Jagannath Temple	Dallas, Texas	United States	
Jagannath Temple	Toronto	Canada	
Jagannath Temple	London	United Kingdom	
Jagannath Temple	Paris	France	
Jagannath Temple	Hong Kong	China (SAR)	
Jagannath Temple	Byron Bay	Australia	
Jagannath Temple	Buenos Aires	Argentina	

== Significance ==
Jagannath temples outside of Puri show how Odia religious traditions have spread beyond their original area. These temples often keep up with cultural traditions like the Ratha Yatra, which helps diaspora communities stay connected to their roots.

== See also ==
- Jagannath Temple, Puri
- Ratha Yatra
- Jagannath
- Culture of Odisha
