= Juggernaut (disambiguation) =

A juggernaut is an unstoppable force.

Juggernaut may also refer to:

== Music ==
- Juggernaut (band), an American progressive thrash metal band
- Juggernaut (Hunters & Collectors album), 1997
- Juggernaut (Frank Marino album), 1982
- Juggernaut (Sun City Girls album), 1994
- Juggernaut: Alpha and Juggernaut: Omega, a double album by Periphery
- Juggernaut, an album (and band led) by Frankie Capp & Nat Pierce
- Juggernaut, an album by Knights of the Abyss
- Juggernaut, an album by Lustmord
- "Juggernaut" (song), by Tyler, the Creator
- "Juggernaut", a single by Autoheart (2023)
- "Juggernaut", a song by Cave In from Until Your Heart Stops (1998)
- "Juggernaut", a song by Clutch from Pitchfork & Lost Needles (2005)
- "Juggernaut", a song by Five Iron Frenzy from Five Iron Frenzy 2: Electric Boogaloo (2001)
- "Juggernaut", a song by Gothminister from Anima Inferna (2011)
- "Juggernaut", a song by Raven from Life's a Bitch (1987)
- "Juggernaut", a single by Sadie (band) (2010)
- "Juggernaut", a song by Swollen Members from Beautiful Death Machine (2013)
- "Juggernauts" (song), a song by Enter Shikari from Common Dreads (2009)

== Film ==
- The Juggernaut, a silent train disaster drama
- Juggernaut (1936 film), a film starring Boris Karloff
- Juggernaut (1974 film), a suspense film about a bomb threat on the fictional liner SS Britannic
- Juggernaut (2003 film), a Dutch documentary film directed by Rob Das
- The Juggernaut, character in Thirteen Ghosts
- A5 Juggernaut, a fictional vehicle, see list of Star Wars air, aquatic, and ground vehicles

== Television ==
- "Juggernaut" (Star Trek: Voyager), an episode of Star Trek: Voyager
- "Juggernaut" (Star Wars: The Bad Batch)
- The Juggernauts, a Doctor Who audio adventure by Scott Alan Woodard
- Juggernaut, fictional computer program in Digimon Tamers

== Games ==
- Juggernaut (video game), a 1999 PlayStation game
- Juggernaut, a game mode in video games, see glossary of video game terms
- The Juggernaut, a unit in Blood & Magic
- Juggernaut, a vehicle in Expanded MultiPlayer
- Juggernaut, a ship type in FreeSpace 2, a 1999 space combat simulation game for the PC
- Juggernaut, a unit type in the Command & Conquer series, including Command & Conquer 3: Kane's Wrath

== Other uses ==
- Juggernaut (wrestler) (born 1976), Canadian professional wrestler
- Juggernaut (character), a Marvel comics character
- Juggernaut (novel), a 1985 novel by Desmond Bagley
- New York/New Jersey Juggernaut, a former team in the National Pro Fastpitch softball league
- Juggernaut, a British word for a large articulated lorry

== See also ==
- The Simpsons: Bart vs. The Juggernauts, a 1992 Simpsons-based Game Boy video game
- Jagannath (disambiguation)
- Jagannath Temple (disambiguation)
