= Jagannath Temple, Dibrugarh =

Shrikshetra Dham, Sri Sri Jagannath Temple
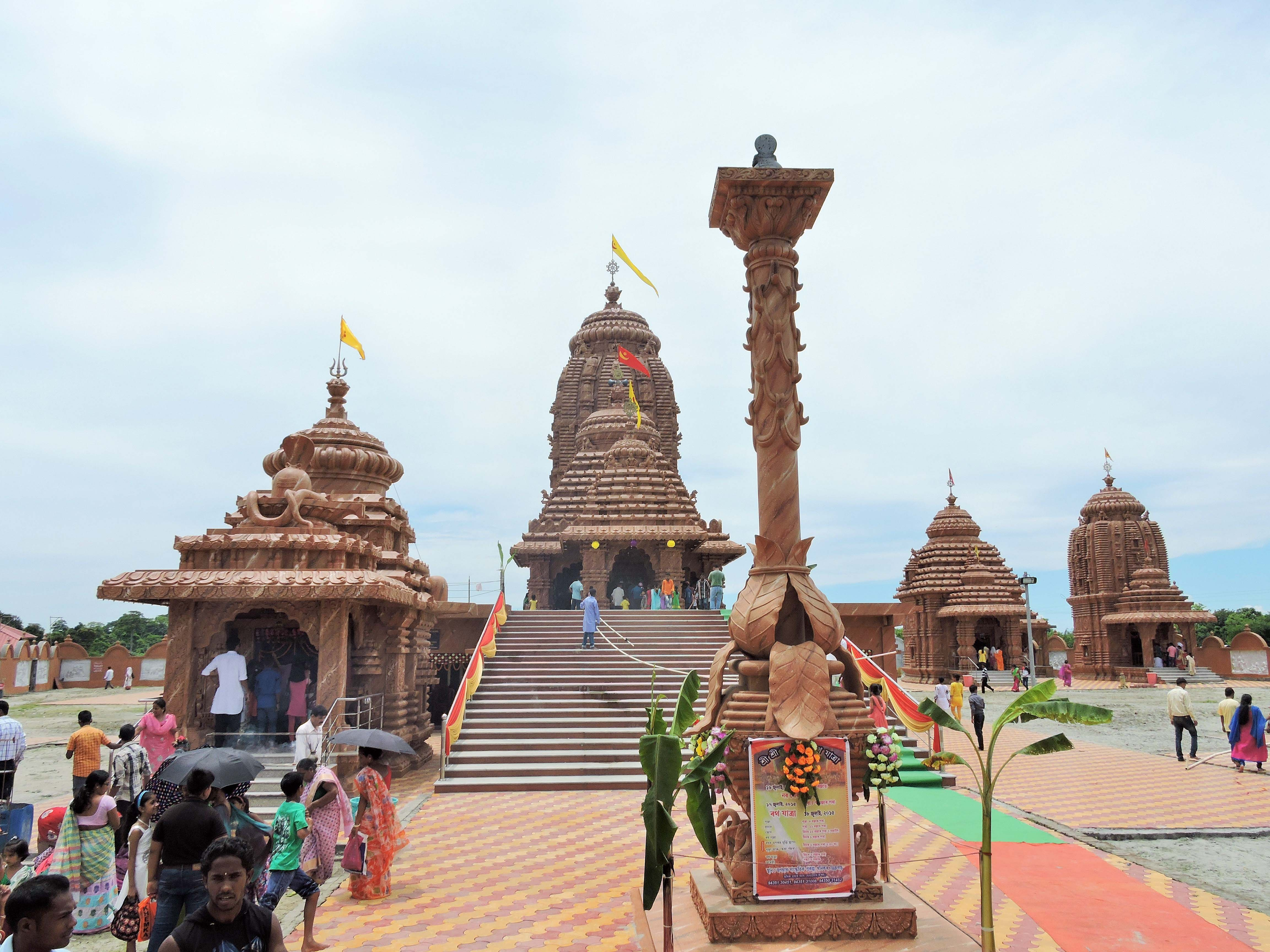
- Jagannath Temple

- Location in Assam

Religion
- Affiliation: Hinduism
- District: Dibrugarh district
- Deity: Jagannath
- Festival: Rath Yatra
- Governing body: Sri Sri Jagannath Cultural Trust

Location
- Location: Khanikar Gaon, Dibrugarh
- State: Assam
- Country: India
- Interactive map of Shrikshetra Dham, Sri Sri Jagannath Temple
- Coordinates: 27°26′10.9″N 94°55′52.9″E

Architecture
- Type: Kalinga architecture
- Completed: 2014

Specifications
- Temple: 7
- Elevation: 25.908 m (85 ft)

Srikshetra Dham, Mahaprabhu Jagannath Temple is a temple dedicated to Lord Jagannath, located in Dibrugarh city in the Dibrugarh district of Assam. The temple was constructed in 2014 as a replica of the Shri Jagannath Temple in Puri, Odisha, which is one of the four major shrines of Hinduism. This temple stands at a height of 85 feet and is situated near the Mahatma Gandhi Park in Khanikar, along the Dibrugarh-Tinsukia bypass road. In terms of architectural design, the temple replicates the second form of the original Jagannath Temple located at Puri.

== History ==
The Jagannath Temple's construction began under the supervision of the Sri Sri Jagannath Cultural Trust, and the required five bighas of land were donated by the Bakpara Tea Estate. The trust currently serves as the official guardian and custodian of the institution. In 2014, the Prana Prastha Samaroh was held in the presence of visiting priests from the Tirupati Balaji Temple. The temple was built by the then Governor of Assam, Janaki Ballabh Patnaik.

== Architecture ==
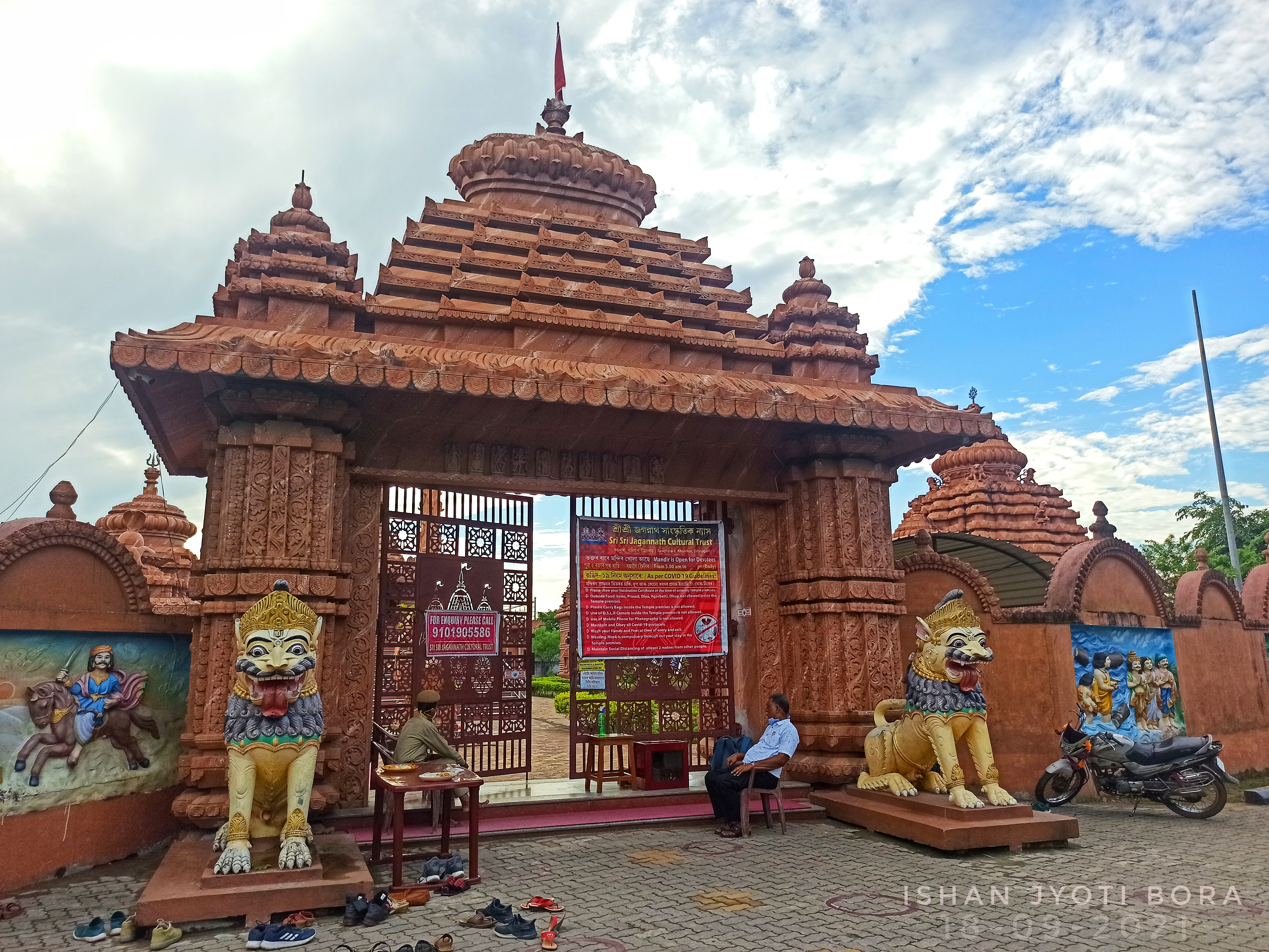
Simhadwara, the main gate of Jagannath temple, Dibrugarh

The Jagannath Temple in Dibrugarh is modeled after the Jagannath Temple in Puri and follows the Kalinga architectural style. The main Shikhar of the temple reaches a height of 26 meters (85 ft). Within the temple grounds, there are seven temples, dedicated to Mahaprabhu Jagannath, Balabhadra, Subhadra, Shiva, Ganesha, Hanuman, Devi and Navagraha. The temple is enclosed by a 3-meter (9.8 ft) high wall adorned with sculptures depicting scenes from Krishna Leela and Puranas. Two entrances provide access to the temple, with the main entrance known as the Simhadwara or Lion Gate, characterized by lion portraits on both sides.

== Transport ==
The Jagannath Temple is situated in Khanikar, approximately 7 km (4.3 mi) from Dibrugarh city along the Dibrugarh-Tinsukia bypass road. Dibrugarh railway station is approximately 7 km (4.3 mi) from the temple, and Dibrugarh airport is around 12 km (7.5 mi) away.

== See also ==
- List of Jagannath Temples outside Puri
