= Jagannath Temple, Bengaluru =

Jagannath Temple, Bangalore
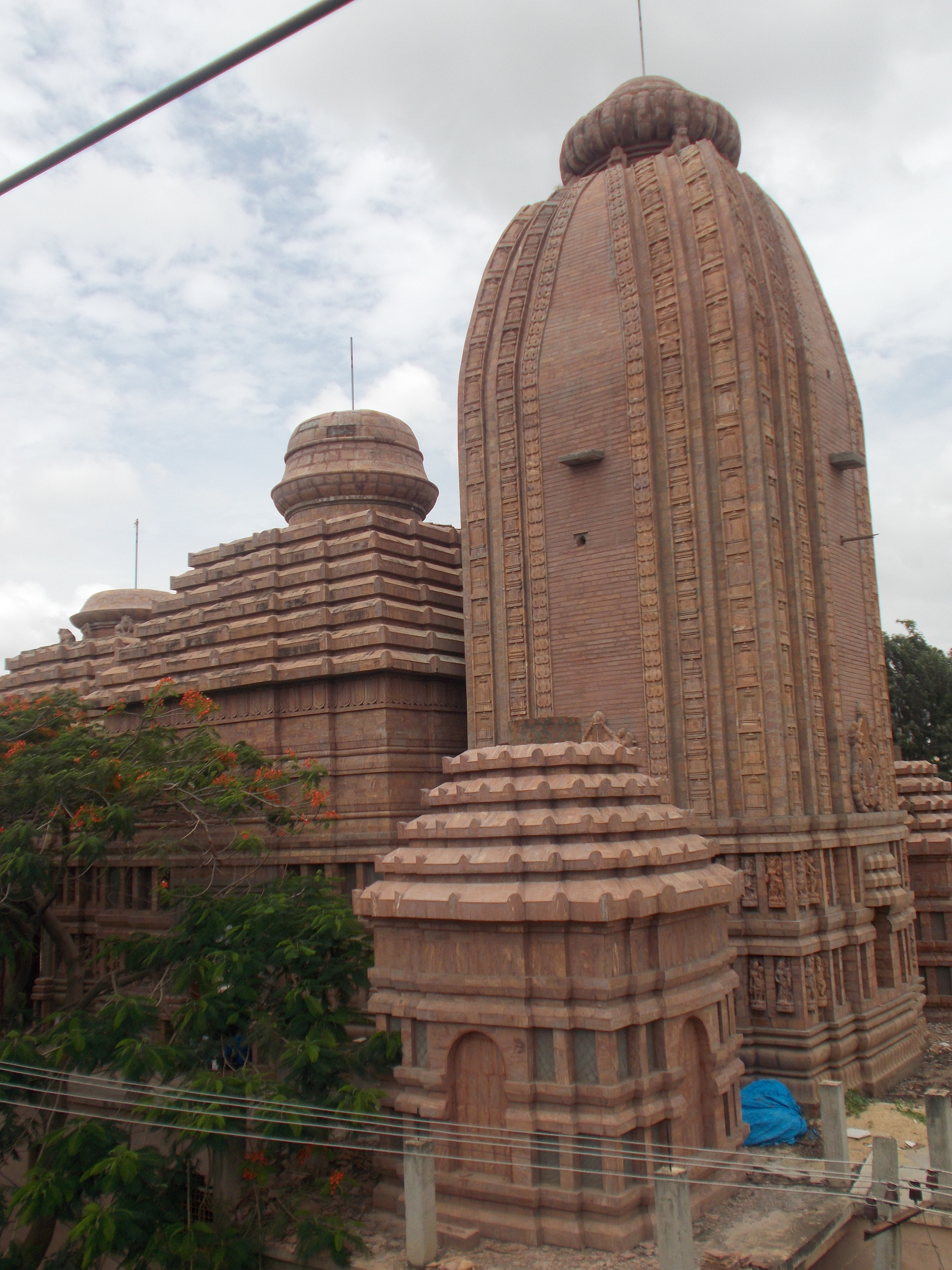
- Jagannath temple in Bangalore
- Location within Bengaluru

Religion
- Affiliation: Hinduism
- District: Bangalore
- Deity: Lord Jagannath, his brother Balabhadra, and sister Subhadra
- Status: Open from 6:00 AM to 01:00 PM and 3:30 PM to 8:30 PM.

Location
- Location: Sarjapur Road in Agara
- State: Karnataka
- Country: India
- Interactive map of Jagannath Temple, Bangalore
- Coordinates: 19°48′N 85°49′E

Jagannath Temple is dedicated to the Hindu god Jagannath, his brother Balabhadra, and sister Subhadra. The temple is located on Sarjapur Road in Agara in Bangalore, Karnataka, India. Its main festival is the annual Rath Yatra, which sees more than fifteen thousand devotees. The temple is maintained by the Shree Jagannath Temple Trust of Bangalore.

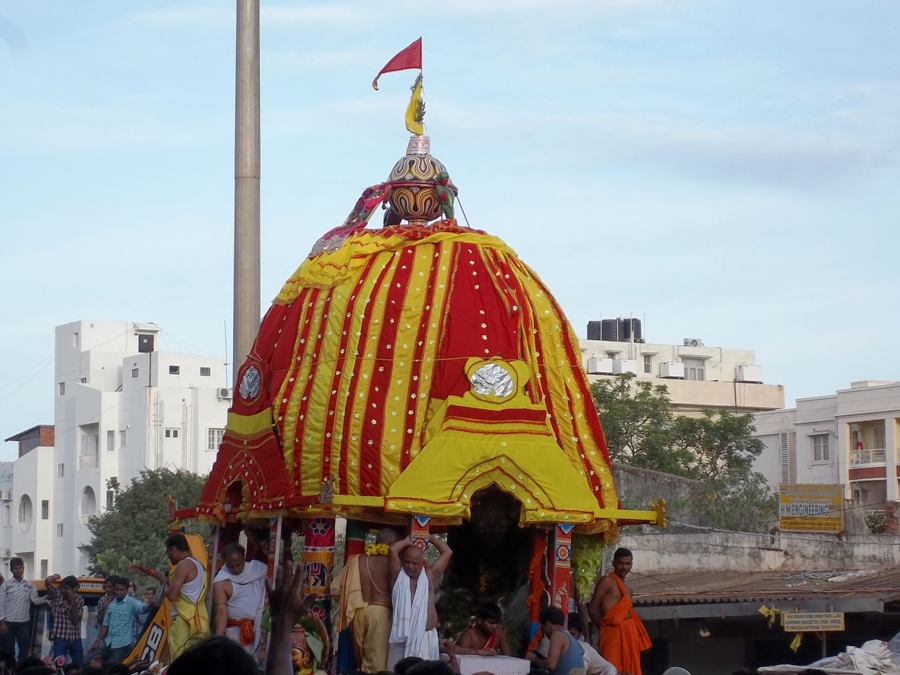
The Rath Yatra festival

== See also ==
- List of Jagannath Temples outside Puri
