= Jagannath Temple, Hyderabad =

Hindu Jagannath temple in Hyderabad, India

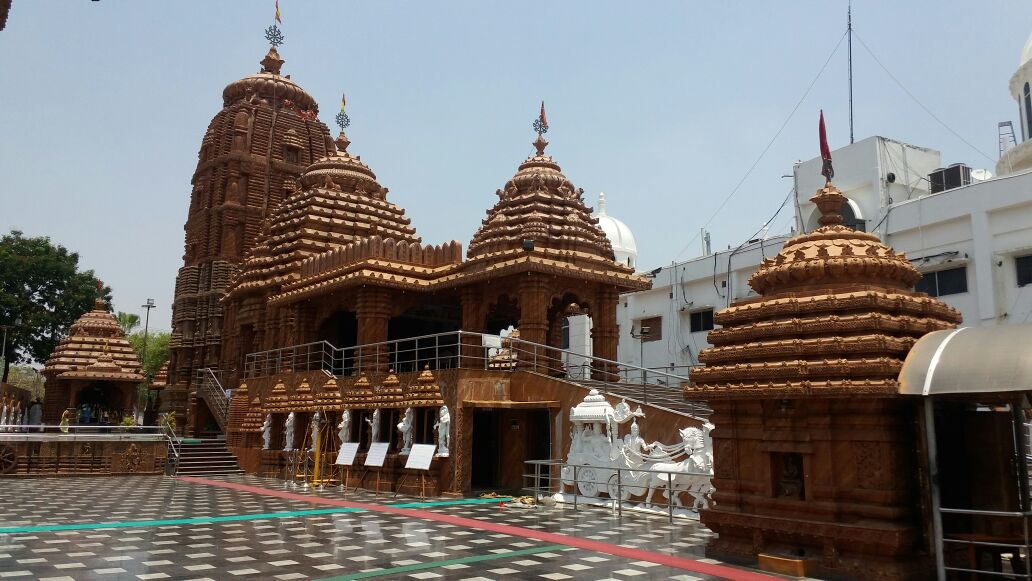

Religion
- Affiliation: Hinduism
- District: Hyderabad
- Deity: Jagannath
- Festival: Rath Yatra
- Governing body: Kalinga Cultural Trust, Hyderabad

Location
- Location: Road 12, Banjara Hills
- State: Telangana
- Country: India
- Interactive map of Jagannath Temple, Hyderabad
- Coordinates: 17.415148°N 78.426232°E

Architecture
- Completed: 2009
- Temple: Five

Website
- http://shrijagannathtemplehyderabad.com

The Jagannath Temple in Hyderabad, India, Telangana, is a modern temple built by the Odia community of the city of Hyderabad dedicated to the Hindu God Jagannath. The temple located near Banjara hills Road no.12 (twelve) in Hyderabad is famous for its annual Rathyatra festival attended by thousands of devotees. Jagannath means Lord of the Universe. The temple which was constructed during 2009 recently lies in Center of Hyderabad City.

== Features ==
It is said that this is a replica of original Jagannath Temple of Puri (Odisha) in context of design. The most attracting portion of this temple is its "Shikhara" (the peak/top) measuring around 70 feet in height. The red color of the temple is due to the usage of sandstone (around 600 tonnes were brought from Odisha which is being used to build this whole architecture) and around 60 stone carvers got the blessing to carve this temple. There are shrines dedicated to Lakshmi, along with Shiva, Ganesh, Hanuman and Navagrahas. The amorous sculptures are also found outside the temple to ward off evil spirits. The sanctum sanctorum houses Lord Jagannath along with his siblings, Lord Balabhadra and Devi Subhadra.

== See also ==
- List of Jagannath Temples outside Puri
