= Jagannath Temple, Digha =

Hindu temple in West Bengal, India

- জগন্নাথ মন্দির, দীঘা
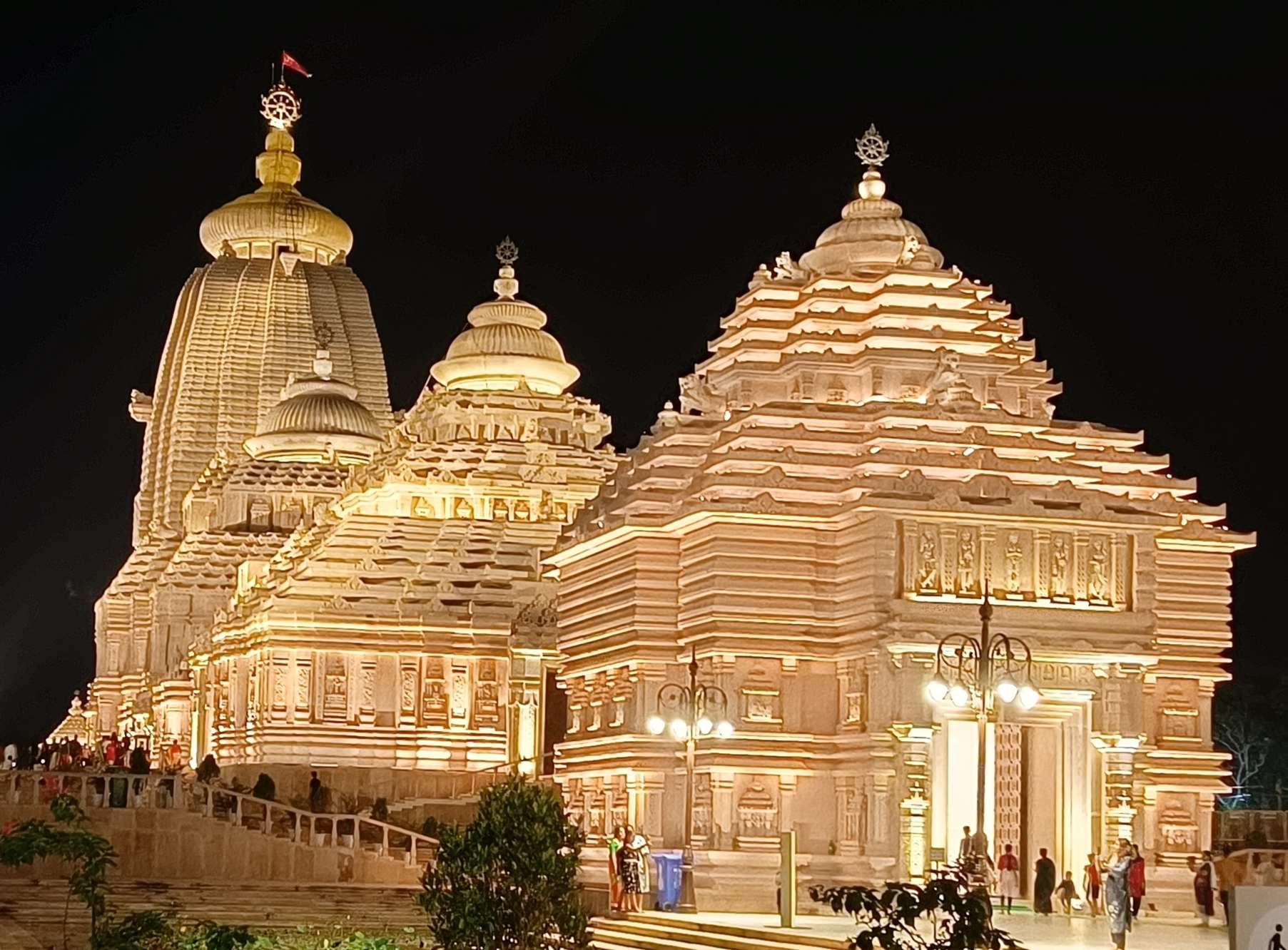

- Location within West Bengal

Religion
- Affiliation: Hinduism
- District: Purba Medinipur
- Deity: Jagannath, Balarama, Subhadra
- Festival: Rath Yatra
- Governing body: Project Monitoring Unit, Government of West Bengal, Trust set up by the government of West Bengal which includes representatives from ISKCON and other Hindu groups
- Status: Running by a team of Project Management unit, Consisting Vaibhab Chaudhury, IAS; Nilanjan Mandal, WBCS(Exe), Debabrata Payra, (A&AS); D.K.Hazra, OSD, Chandan Dalui, UDA; Abhijit Dasgupta, UDA; Subhadip Samanta, LDA; & Shantanu Bhunia, LDA.

Location
- Location: Digha
- State: West Bengal
- Country: India
- Coordinates: 21.6230076°N 87.4923572°E

Architecture
- Type: Kalinga architecture
- Style: Nagara Style
- Creator: HIDCO
- Established: 30 April 2025
- Groundbreaking: 2022
- Completed: April 2025

Specifications
- Direction of façade: North
- Site area: 24 acres (9.71 ha)

Website
- jagannathdham-digha.in

The Jagannath Temple at Digha, is a Hindu temple dedicated to Jagannath, located in the town of Digha, Purba Medinipur district, West Bengal, India. The temple enshrines the deity Jagannath, a form of Vishnu, along with his siblings Balarama and Subhadra. The temple was inaugurated on 30 April 2025 after a prana pratishtha (consecration) ceremony.

The temple is sacred to the Vaishnava tradition of Hinduism and has been constructed as a replica of the famous Jagannath Temple in Puri, Odisha. The project was announced in 2018, construction commenced in 2022, and the temple was officially inaugurated on 30 April 2025.

== History ==
=== Planning and construction ===
Mamata Bannerjee, Chief Minister of West Bengal, announced the construction of Jagannath Temple at Digha on 20 December 2018. The project aimed to create a grand temple complex to attract devotees and tourists, similar to the Jagannath Temple in Puri.

The detailed project report of the temple was completed by August 2019. CM Mamata Banerjee announced on 20 August 2019 that the construction of the temple would be completed within two years.

There was talk of building a new temple on the site of the old Jagannath temple on the seashore. However, the temple could not be built there due to environmental restrictions. Later, land was selected for building the temple next to Digha railway station. Digha-Shankarpur Development Authority provided 20 acres of land for the temple. The construction of the temple was entrusted to West Bengal Housing Infrastructure Development Corporation (HIDCO). State Minister Akhil Giri launched the Jagannath Temple construction work on the auspicious Akshaya Tritiya Tithi in May 2022, an initiative of the state government. 2 billion was allocated as construction cost.

Chief Minister Mamata Banerjee visited the under-construction temple on 4 April 2023. She said,

Bengali: ‘বিরাট একটা কর্মযজ্ঞ চলছে। হাজার হাজার বছর ধরে জগন্নাথের এই মন্দির প্রতিষ্ঠিত থাকবে।’
Translated into English: A huge construction work is going on. This Jagannath's temple will be established for thousands of years.

=== Prana pratishtha and inauguration ===
The temple was inaugurated on 30 April 2025, but the yajna began on 24 April as a pre-inauguration activity. First, a yajna was performed to Vastu Purush, with the aim of freeing the newly constructed structure from the clutches of evil spirits or negative forces. The "Maha Yajna" began on 29 April.

The priests, led by Rajesh Dayitapati, one of the chief devotees of the Jagannath Temple in Puri, have completed the process of prana pratishtha of the Jagannath murti made of neem-wood. After this, ISKCON devotees performed the ritual of prana pratishtha of the stone made Jagannath murti; at the same time, prana pratishtha was completed in stone idol of Radha Krishna. Chief Minister of West Bengal Mamata Banerjee inaugurated the temple on 30 April, on the auspicious occasion of Akshaya Tritiya—between 3 pm and 3:15 pm. On that day, after the inauguration, the temple was kept open to the public for five minutes to view the temple and the deities.

== Deities ==
Jagannath, Balabhadra and Subhadra, along with Sudarshan, will be worshipped as deities in the temple.

== Architecture ==
This temple is conceived as a deliberate architectural homage to the iconic Jagannath Temple of Puri, aiming to serve as a near-replica in both scale and style by Architecture Studio - Salient, based in Kolkata. It is built in the Kalingan architectural style. The height of this temple 65 metres (213 ft). The temple features a grand vimana (tower). It is constructed with marble flooring imported from Vietnam, adding elegance and durability. Made with famous sandstone from Rajasthan's Banshi Hills has been used to build this temple. Its intricate design elements and sculptural details reflect the craftsmanship of artisans from multiple states, while the overall layout and orientation pay homage to eastern India's spiritual and architectural traditions.

== Controversy ==
=== Opposition from Puri Servitor Nijogs ===
The inauguration of the Jagannath Temple in Digha sparked controversy, particularly among servitor groups from the Shree Jagannath Temple in Puri. Two major nijogs—Suar-Mahasuar and Puspalaka—issued formal warnings to their members, prohibiting participation in any rituals at the Digha temple, including preparing bhoga (Mahaprasad) or dressing the deities. Notices and circulars were distributed within the Puri temple premises, stating that violators could face social boycott and expulsion from their respective associations.

The servitors argued that replicating the sacred rituals of Puri outside the original Jagannath temple threatens the spiritual and cultural integrity of the centuries-old tradition.

The issue was further exacerbated by reports of senior Daitapati servitor Ramakrushna Dasmahapatra participating in the Digha temple’s consecration, despite a directive from key servitor associations prohibiting their members from engaging in rituals outside Puri. They viewed the association with the Digha temple as a violation of tradition. Dasmahapatra, who serves as the secretary of a Nijog, faced criticism from both former and current leaders in the servitor community, who questioned the legitimacy of his involvement and his claims surrounding the sourcing of the idols.

=== Naming Dispute Over "Jagannath Dham" ===
Tensions escalated following promotional material for the Digha temple suggesting that devotees "need not go to Puri to see Jagannath Dham," a claim that was widely criticised in Odisha as undermining the religious and historical uniqueness of the Puri temple. Furthermore, narratives implying that "Jagannath left Puri for Digha" were strongly opposed by many in Odisha, who viewed them as distortions of deeply held religious beliefs and an affront to the cultural identity associated with the original shrine.

The naming of the newly inaugurated Jagannath temple in Digha as "Jagannath Dham" has drawn widespread criticism from servitors, scholars, and devotees in Odisha. Many have objected to the West Bengal government's promotion of the temple using the term Dham, which they argue traditionally refers to one of the four sacred pilgrimage sites (Char Dham) in Hinduism, of which Puri, the original Jagannath temple, is one. Critics claim the use of this term for the Digha temple undermines the spiritual and cultural uniqueness of the 12th-century shrine in Puri. Devotees and servitors have strongly demanded the removal of this tag, citing cultural and religious misrepresentation.

=== Allegations of Using Surplus Nabakalebara Daru ===
Following the inauguration of the temple, a controversy emerged over claims that sacred Daru (neem wood) left over from the 2015 Nabakalebara ceremony at the Shree Jagannath Temple in Puri had been used to carve the idols installed at the Digha temple.

The controversy originated from a report in the Bengali media, which quoted Ramakrushna Dasmahapatra, a senior Daitapati servitor from Puri who officiated at the Digha temple's consecration. He was reported to have stated that he transported surplus Daru from the 2015 Nabakalebara ritual to craft the idols and further claimed that the idea of installing wooden idols came at the suggestion of West Bengal Chief Minister Mamata Banerjee, whom he referred to as a disciple.

The claim led to significant public and religious outcry in Odisha, with concerns raised over the sanctity and protocol of the Nabakalebara ritual. In response, Odisha's Law Minister Prithiviraj Harichandan ordered an official inquiry through the Shree Jagannath Temple Administration (SJTA), stating that any misuse of sacred Daru would be taken seriously, and appropriate legal action would be initiated against those found responsible.

Amid widespread backlash in Odisha, Dasmahapatra later denied the allegations at a press conference in Puri, stating that his earlier comments had been misquoted or manipulated. He clarified that, when he first visited the site four months earlier, the idols were initially made of stone. As Lord Jagannath is traditionally worshipped only in neem wood form, he advised West Bengal Chief Minister Mamata Banerjee to commission wooden idols. Consequently, wooden idols of Jagannath, Balabhadra, and Subhadra, each measuring approximately 2.5 to 3 feet, were crafted in Puri from regular neem wood and brought to Digha for consecration. He denied using any sacred Daru from the 2015 Nabakalebara ceremony for the Digha temple idols. He later retracted the statement, calling it a slip of the tongue.

Subsequently, the SJTA submitted its inquiry report confirming that no Daru from the 2015 Nabakalebara ritual was used in the making of the Digha temple idols. Odisha Law Minister Harichandan, addressing the media, reaffirmed this conclusion. He stated that the idols were carved by Bhubaneswar-based sculptor Sudarshan Maharana using ordinary neem wood and that the previously reported claim regarding the use of sacred Daru was unfounded.

=== Suspension of Ramakrushna Dasmohapatra ===
In May 2025, the Shree Jagannath Temple Administration (SJTA) suspended Ramakrushna Dasmohapatra, a senior Daitapati servitor and secretary of the Daitapati Nijog, for one month following his involvement in the consecration ceremony of the Jagannath temple in Digha, West Bengal.

The suspension was based on two show-cause notices. The first, issued on 4 May, asked him to explain why he allegedly violated temple tradition by claiming on a Bengali news channel that the idols at the Digha temple were carved from surplus Daru (sacred neem wood) from the 2015 Nabakalebara of the Puri temple—an assertion that sparked widespread outrage among devotees. Although he later retracted the statement, calling it a slip of the tongue, the SJTA considered the remarks serious enough to merit disciplinary action.

The second notice, dated 9 May, questioned his participation in the Digha temple consecration in his capacity as a Puri servitor and whether he objected to the temple being referred to as a “Jagannath Dham,” a title traditionally reserved for the original temple in Puri.

SJTA Chief Administrator Arabinda Padhee stated that the suspension aimed to preserve the dignity and discipline of Srimandir. He noted that Dasmohapatra’s actions had harmed the temple’s image and hurt the religious sentiments of devotees. As part of the disciplinary measure, Dasmohapatra was barred from performing any temple rituals during the suspension period.

=== Political Reactions and Allegations of Politicisation ===
Many view these developments as an attempt to politicize religious sentiments, labelling the project as political maneuvering rather than an act of genuine religious reverence.

The inauguration of the Jagannath Temple in Digha by CM Banerjee in April 2025 led to significant political controversy. Opposition parties, especially the BJP, accused the state government of misusing public funds for religious purposes, which they argued violates the constitutional principle of secularism and alleged the move was politically motivated to gain Hindu votes ahead of elections. The BJP also criticized Banerjee’s perceived inconsistency in religious outreach, calling the temple a "cultural center" rather than a genuine shrine. In response to that, the Government of West Bengal defended it as a tourism initiative.

=== Renaming of the Digha Jagannath Temple Complex ===
The naming of the Jagannath temple complex in Digha as "Jagannath Dham" drew objections from servitor organisations, and devotees in Odisha, who argued that the designation is traditionally associated with the Jagannath Temple in Puri. Odisha Chief Minister Mohan Charan Majhi raised the issue with then West Bengal Chief Minister Mamata Banerjee and requested that the word "Dham" be removed from the complex's name; however, no action was taken.

Following the formation of a new government in West Bengal, Majhi renewed the request on 9 June 2026 through a formal letter addressed to Chief Minister Suvendu Adhikari, which was personally delivered by Puri MP Sambit Patra. Accepting the request, Adhikari announced that the word "Dham" would be removed from the name of the Digha temple complex. He stated that the previous Trinamool Congress government had approved the project as a cultural centre and alleged that the inclusion of the term "Dham" distorted Sanatan traditions and culture. Adhikari further stated that the designation would be withdrawn as it was inconsistent with Sanatan religious traditions.

== Removal of the "Dham" Suffix ==
Odisha Chief Minister Mohan Charan Majhi urged West Bengal Chief Minister Suvendu Adhikari to remove the word "Dham" from the name of the Jagannath temple complex in Digha, arguing that the designation "Jagannath Dham" is traditionally and exclusively associated with the Jagannath Temple in Puri. He suggested that the complex be renamed "Shri Jagannath Temple, Digha" or another alternative name to preserve the distinct identity and religious significance of Puri's Jagannath Dham.

Following discussions and objections raised by religious leaders and devotees, Adhikari agreed to remove the word "Dham" from the name of the Digha temple complex, stating that the decision was taken in consideration of devotees' sentiments. Majhi had previously raised the issue with former West Bengal Chief Minister Mamata Banerjee in May 2025 amid similar concerns regarding the use of the term.

== See also ==
- Bengali Hindus
- Hinduism in West Bengal
- List of Jagannath Temples outside Puri
