= Jagannath Temple, Gunupur =

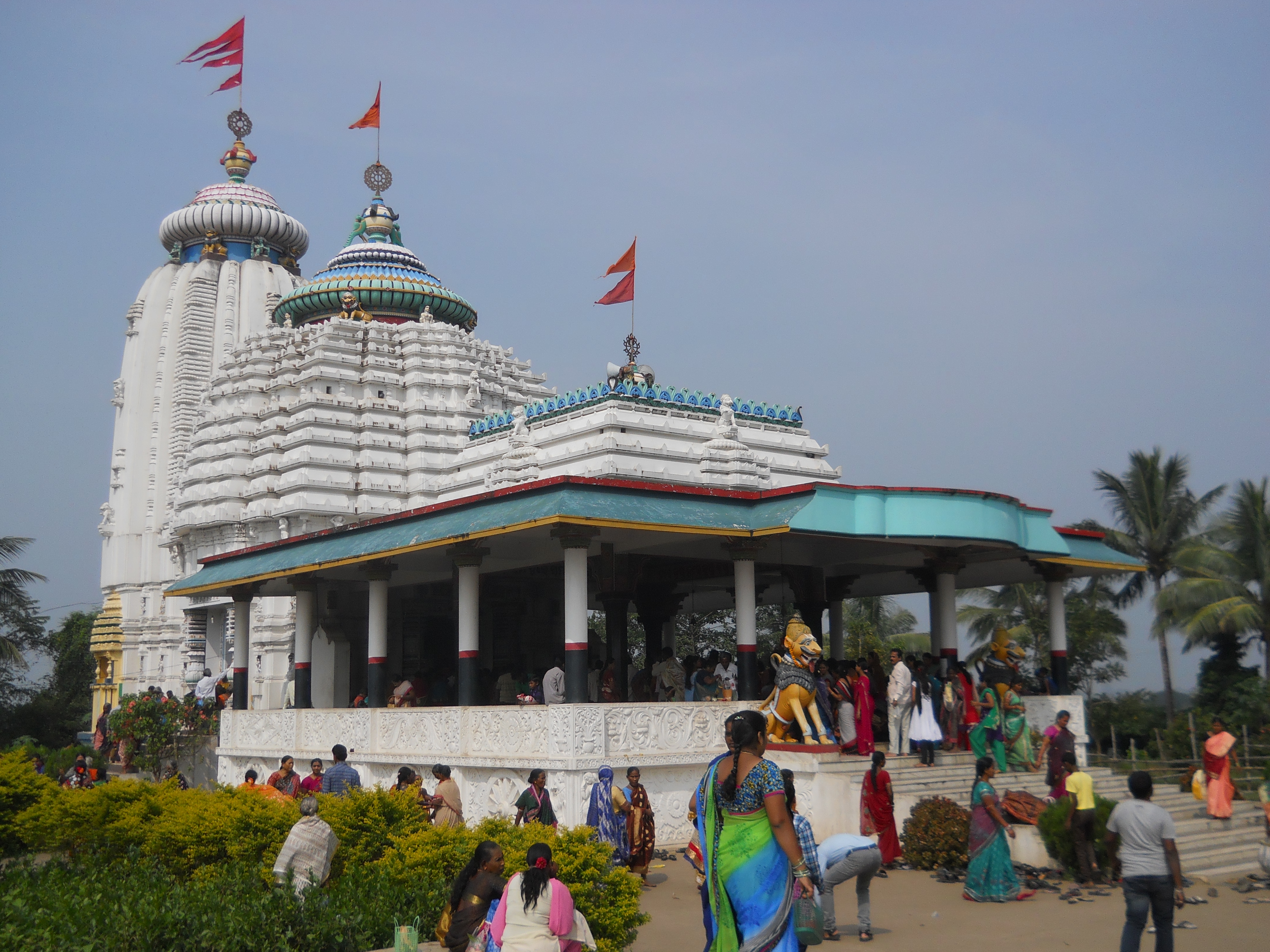
- Jagannath Temple, Gunupur

Religion
- Affiliation: Hinduism
- District: Rayagada
- Deity: Jagannath
- Festival: Rath yatra

Location
- State: Odisha
- Country: India
- Interactive map of Jagannath Temple, Gunupur
- Coordinates: 19.083992°N 83.818788°E

Architecture
- Type: Kalinga Architecture
- Temple: 04

Jagannath Temple,(Odia: ଶ୍ରୀ ଜଗନ୍ନାଥ ମନ୍ଦିର) Gunupur, stands at the eastern end of the town Gunupur in the Old Gunupur area. The old temple was built by the Jeypore Maharaja Vikramadeb more than 100 years back.

== History ==
Lord Jagannath, Balabhadra and Subhadra are the main deities in the temple. The present structure of the temple, with a new look, has been built in the year 1997. The old structure stands beside the new Temple.

The temple is at a distance of 180 km from Sabara Shreekhetra Koraput.

== See also ==
- List of Temples in Rayagada district
- List of Jagannath Temples outside Puri
