= Jagannath Mandir, Dharakot =

Coordinates: 19.644114°N 84.575258°E

Dharakot Jagannath Mandir
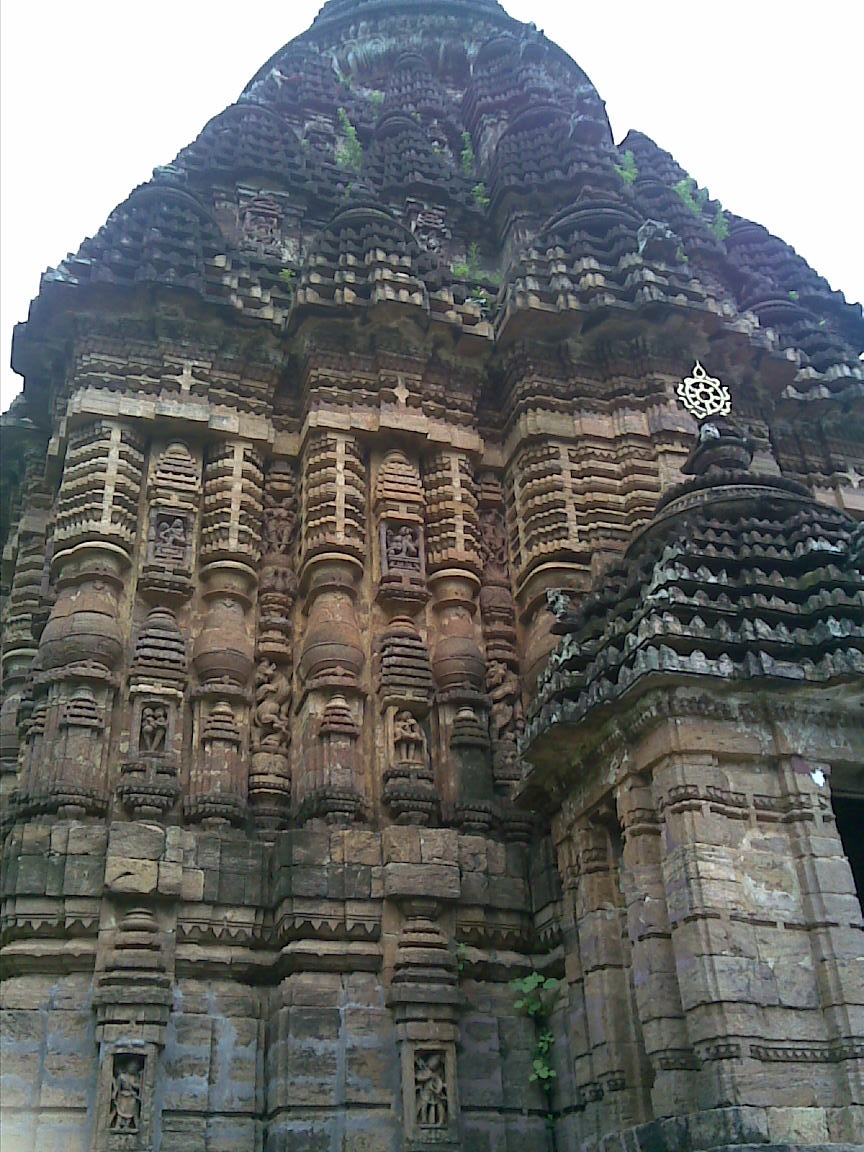

Religion
- Affiliation: Hinduism
- District: Ganjam
- Deity: Jagannath; Balabhadra; Subhadra
- Festival: Rath Yatra

Location
- Location: Dharakot
- State: Odisha
- Country: India
- Interactive map of Dharakot Jagannath Mandir

Dharakot Jagannath Mandir (Odia: ଧରାକୋଟ ଜଗନ୍ନାଥ ମନ୍ଦିର) is a Hindu Jagannath Mandir located in Dharakot of Ganjam district in the Indian state of Odisha.

The mandir is built in contemporary Kalinga architecture, similar to the Jagannath Temple, Puri. It is known among locals for its Ekadasi Cart festival.

The foundation was laid by Raja Jai Singh in 1732 and was completed by Raja Madan Mohan Singh Deo of Dharakot Zamindari.

== Geography ==
Dharakot is located 23 km from Surada, 12 km from Asika and 55 km from Brahmapur in NH-59.

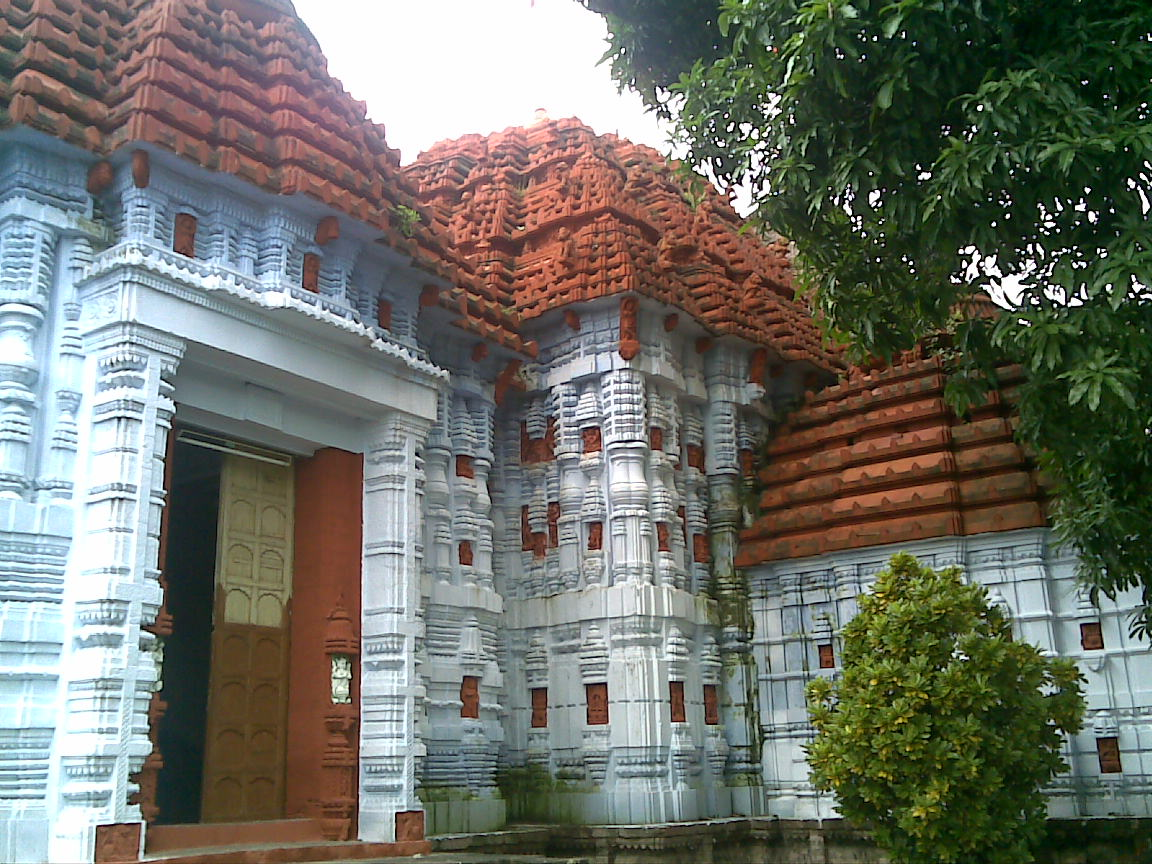
Main entrance

== List of Dharakot Rajas ==
- Raja Hadu Singh 1476–1540
- Raja Rai Singh 1540–1602
- Raja Narayan Singh 1602–1647
- Raja Purushottam Singh 1647–1699
- Raja Ram Chandra Singh 1699–1731
- Raja Jai Singh 1731–1748
- Raja Rajendra Singh 1748–1780
- Raja Damodar Singh 1780
- Raja Krushna Singh 1780–1788
- Raja Jaganath Singh 1788–1830
- Raja Raghunath Singh 1830–1863
- Raja Braja Sundar Singh 1863–1880
- Raja Madan Mohan Singh Deo 1880–1937
- Raja Brajkishore Singh Deo 1937–1938
- Raja Padmanabh Singh Deo 1946–1949
- Raja Anant Narayan Singh Deo 1974–2003
- Raja Kishore Chandra Singh Deo 2003–2010
- Rani Sulakshana Geetanjali Devi (2010–current titular ruler)

== See also ==
- List of Jagannath Temples outside Puri
