= Jagannath Temple, Alwar =

Coordinates: 27.5305792°N 76.6038109°E

Jagannath Temple
- जगन्नाथ मन्दिर
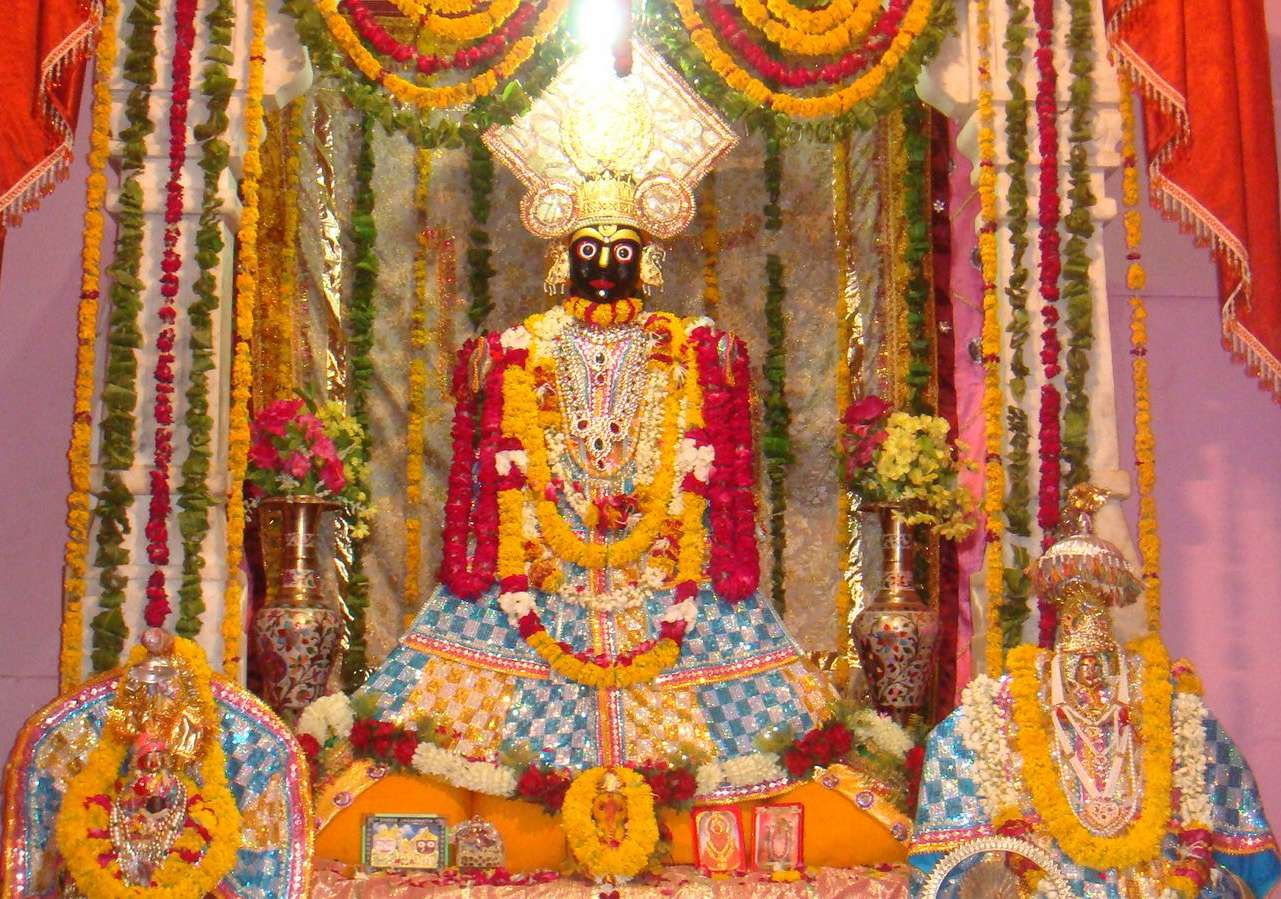
- The main deities in Garbhagriha SitaRamJi, JagannathJi, JankiJi

Religion
- Affiliation: Hinduism
- Deity: Jagannath
- Festival: Rath Yatra

Location
- Location: Alwar
- Interactive map of Jagannath Temple

Architecture
- Type: Medieval

Jagannath Temple (Devnagari: जगन्नाथ मन्दिर) is a Hindu temple to Vishnu in Alwar, India. The temple's presiding Hindu deity is an anthropomorphic form of Jagannath of Puri, while other two deities are SitaramJi, the Shaligram maharaj and JankiJi, the Hindu goddess Laxmi. The temple is built several meters above the ground in old part of the city. It has medieval architecture and rare floral motifs adorn its walls and pillars. The Garbhagriha has two deities of Jagannath, one is movable while other is fixed. It is probably the only temple where two Hindu deities of one presiding deity reside simultaneously. The temple has an annual Rath Yatra festival where Jagannath is carried in a chariot called Indra Vimana. The chariot, earlier an elephant carriage, had been used by erstwhile Maharaja of Alwar and was donated to the temple later on to be used for the Rath yatra. The Rath Yatra festival follows different traditions and rituals than those of Puri. Here, it is part of annual wedding celebration between Jagannath and JankiJi at Roopbas. The fixed deity of Jagannath, Budhe Jagannath, is much older and available for darshana only for five days during Rath Yatra.

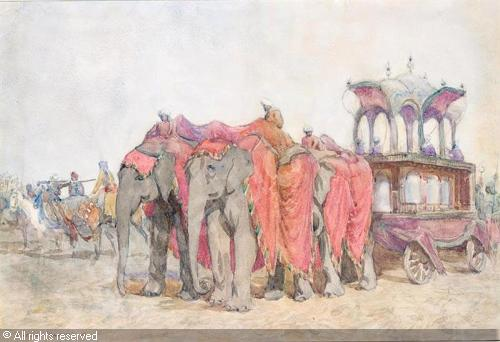
Elephant stage carriage of Maharaja of Alwar, presently being used for Rath Yatra

== Gallery ==
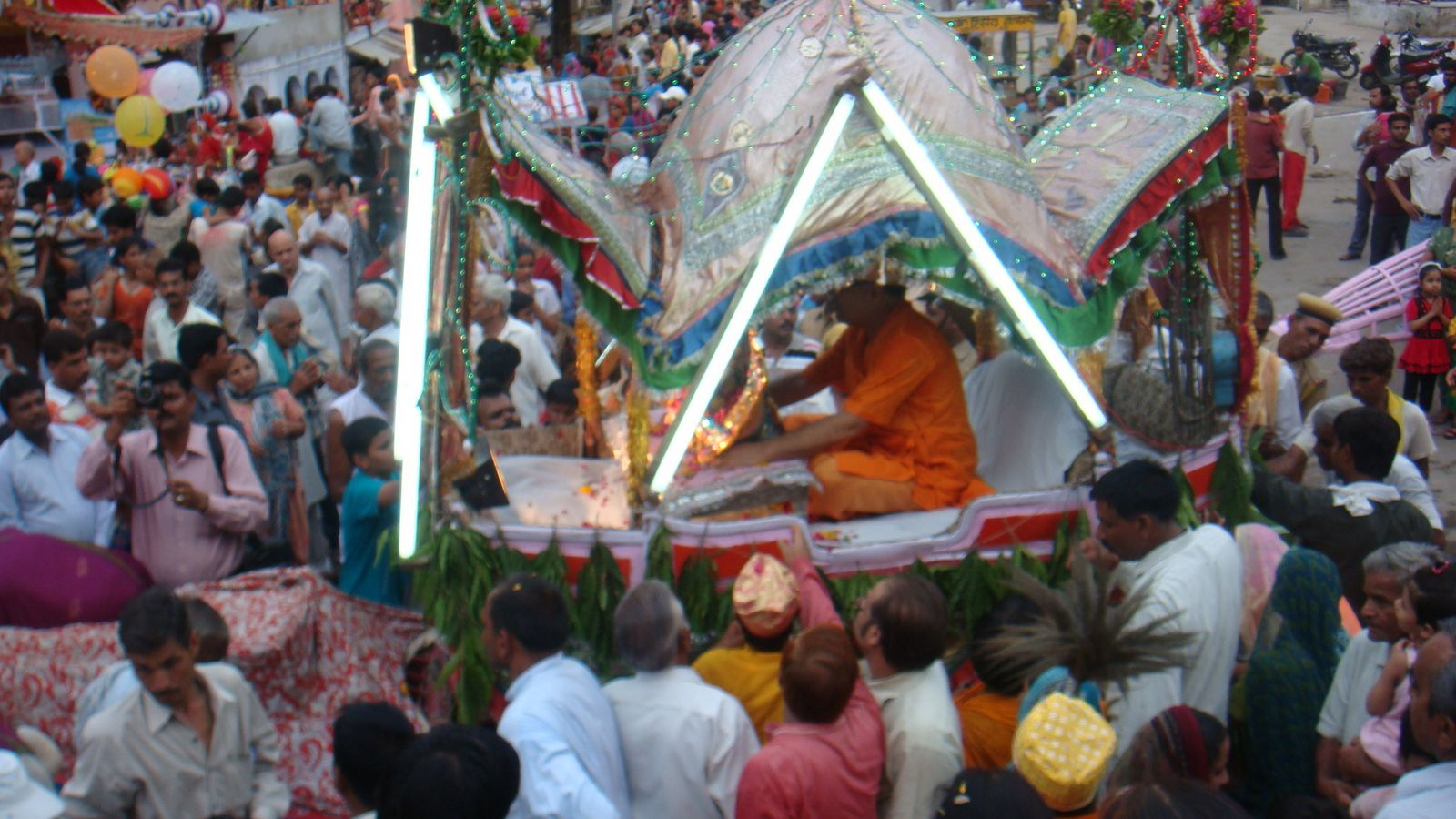
SitaRamJi being taken to RupBas

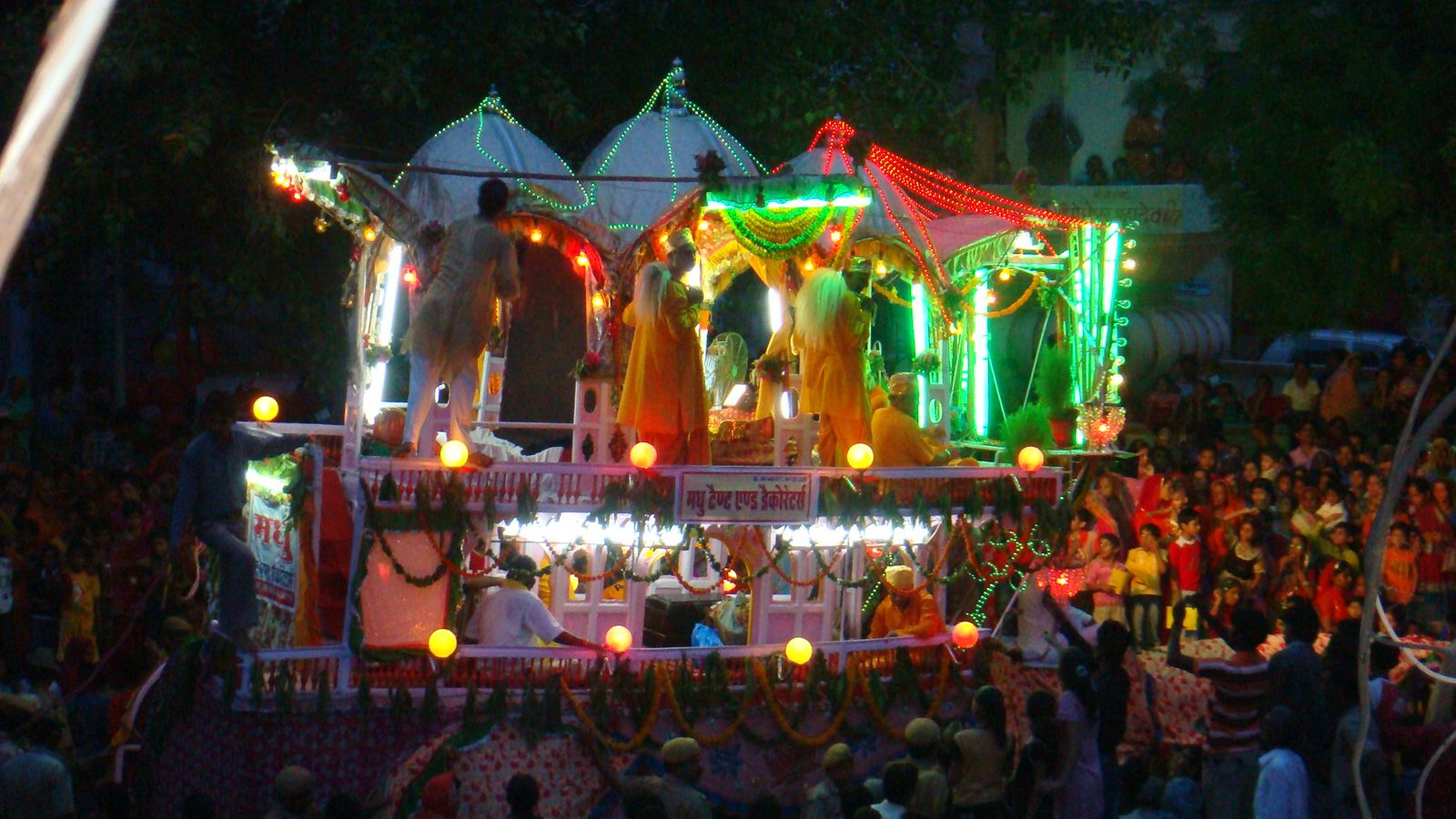
JagannathJi seated on Indra Vimana

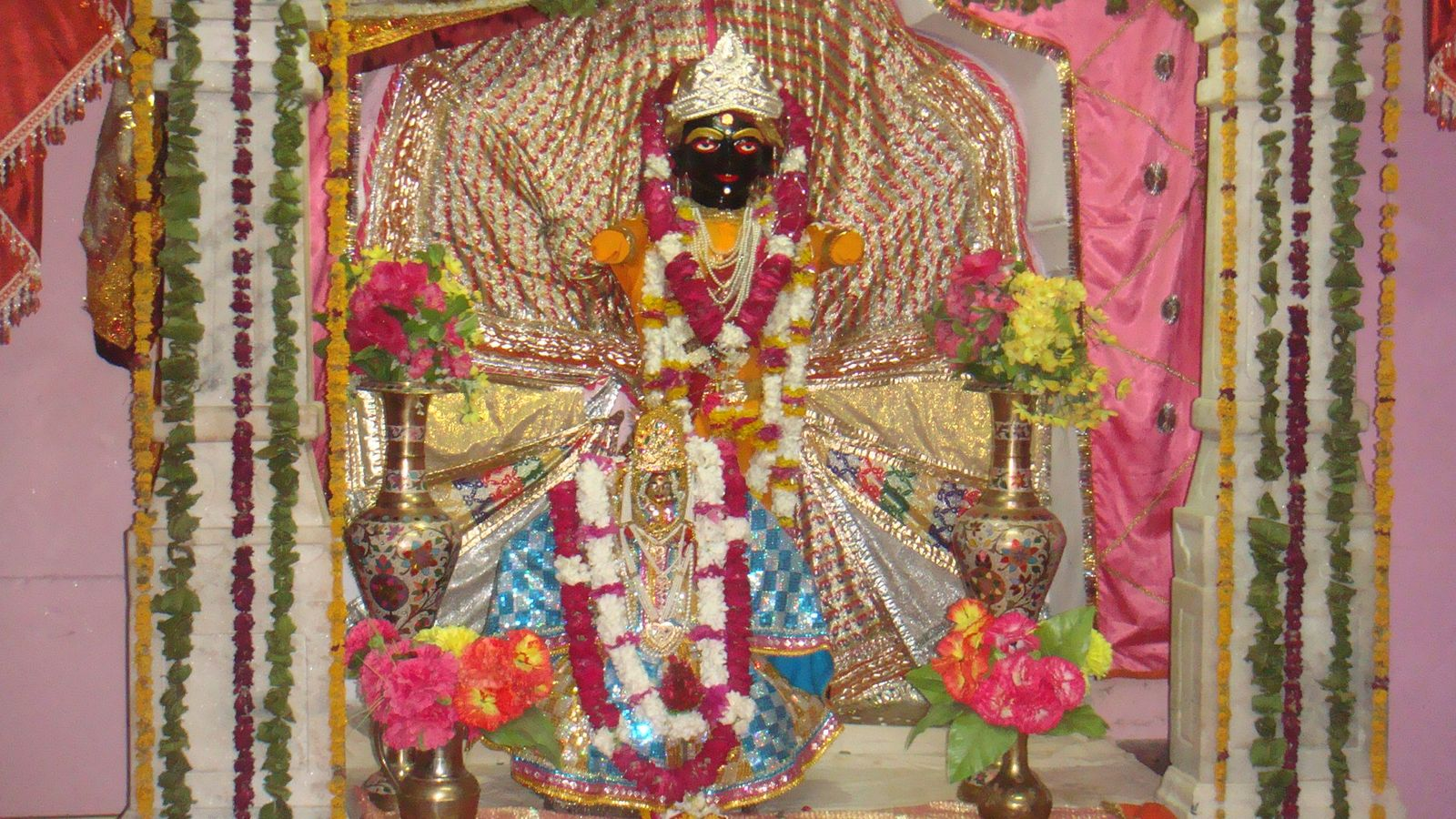
JankiJi with Old deity of Jagannath

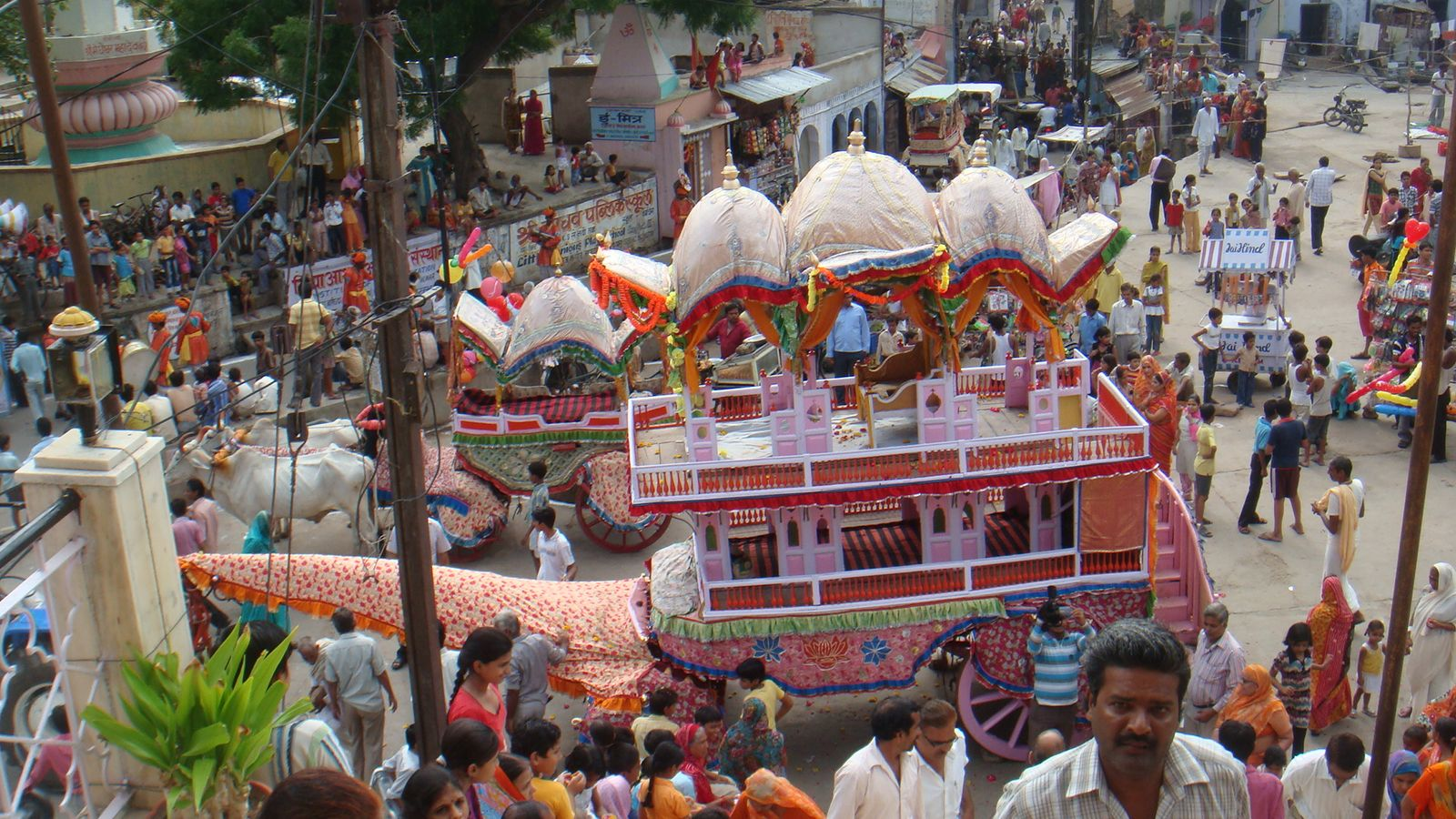
JankiJi's Rath

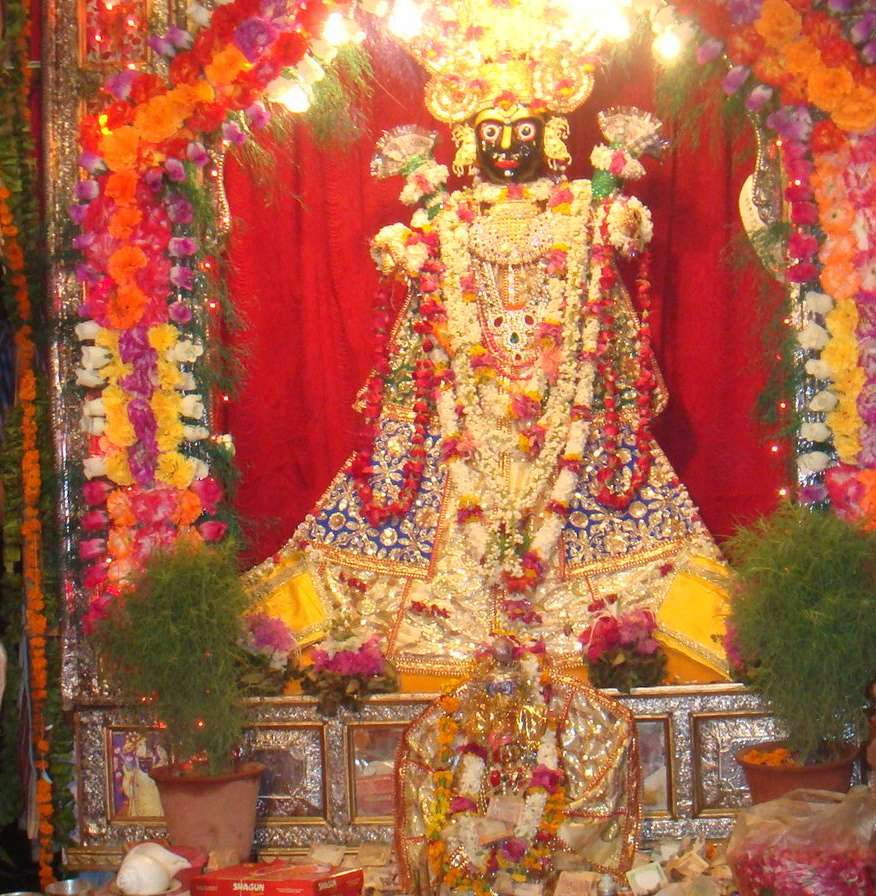
JagannathJi at RupBas

Indra Vimana

== See also ==
- List of Jagannath Temples outside Puri
