= Shri Jagannath Puri Temple =

Provincial heritage site in KwaZulu-Natal, South Africa

The Shri Jagannath Puri Temple is a provincial heritage site in Inanda (eThekwini Metropolitan Municipality) in the KwaZulu-Natal province of South Africa.

In 1979, it was described in the Government Gazette as

23m high tower (shikhara), single entrance capped by an octangenal squat shape and a dome...This richly ornamented temple was constructed by Pandit Shiskishan Maharaj, a Hindu priest who immigrated to South Africa in 1895. The temple, surrounded by a moat, was dedicated to the Hindu God Jagannath.
