= Jagannath Temple, Koraput =

- ଜଗନ୍ନାଥ ମନ୍ଦିର, କୋରାପୁଟ ଶାବର ଶ୍ରୀକ୍ଷେତ୍ର
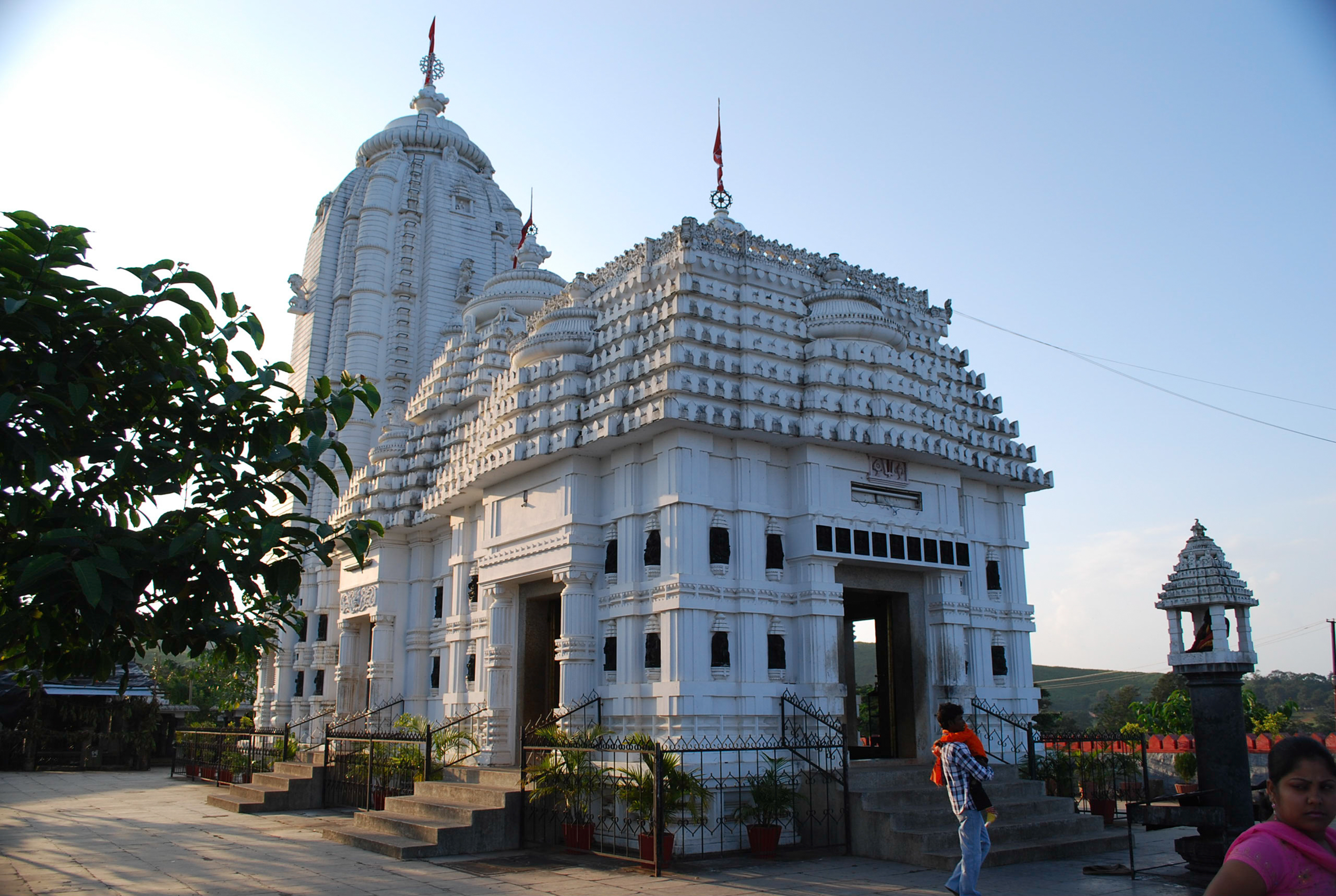

- Jagannath Temple in Odisha

Religion
- Affiliation: Hinduism
- Deity: Jagannath

Location
- Location: Koraput district
- State: Odisha
- Country: India
- Coordinates: 18°48′38.18″N 82°42′33.11″E

Architecture
- Type: Kalinga architecture
- Completed: 20th century CE

Shri Jagannath temple (Odia: ଶ୍ରୀ ଜଗନ୍ନାଥ ମନ୍ଦିର) (popularly known as "Shabara Shrikshetra") is a Hindu temple in Koraput, Odisha, India, dedicated to the deity Jagannath.

The Sabara Srikhetra temple complex is located on a hillock about 3,000 feet above the mean sea level. The main temple is surrounded by nine side temples of different Gods and Goddesses. The temple is open to the public.

During Ratha Yatra, one Tribal Chief does the Chhera Panhanra,(sweeping) on the chariot that is traditionally performed by the Gajapati Maharaja at Puri. The heads of tribal villages near Koraput are honoured during the event with scarfs presented by the Collector & District Magistrate of the Koraput district.

== Gallery ==
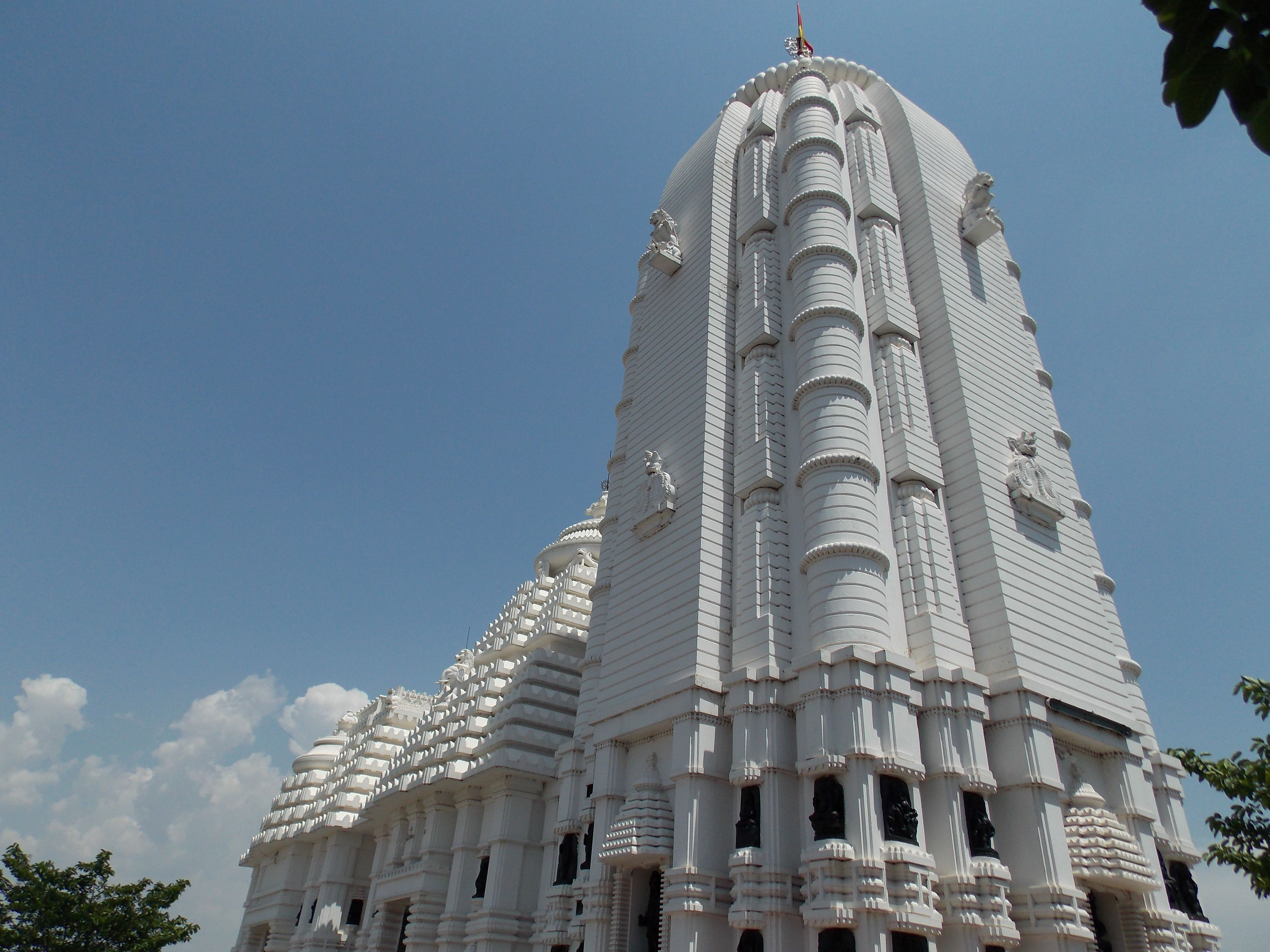
Main Jagannatha Temple at Koraput

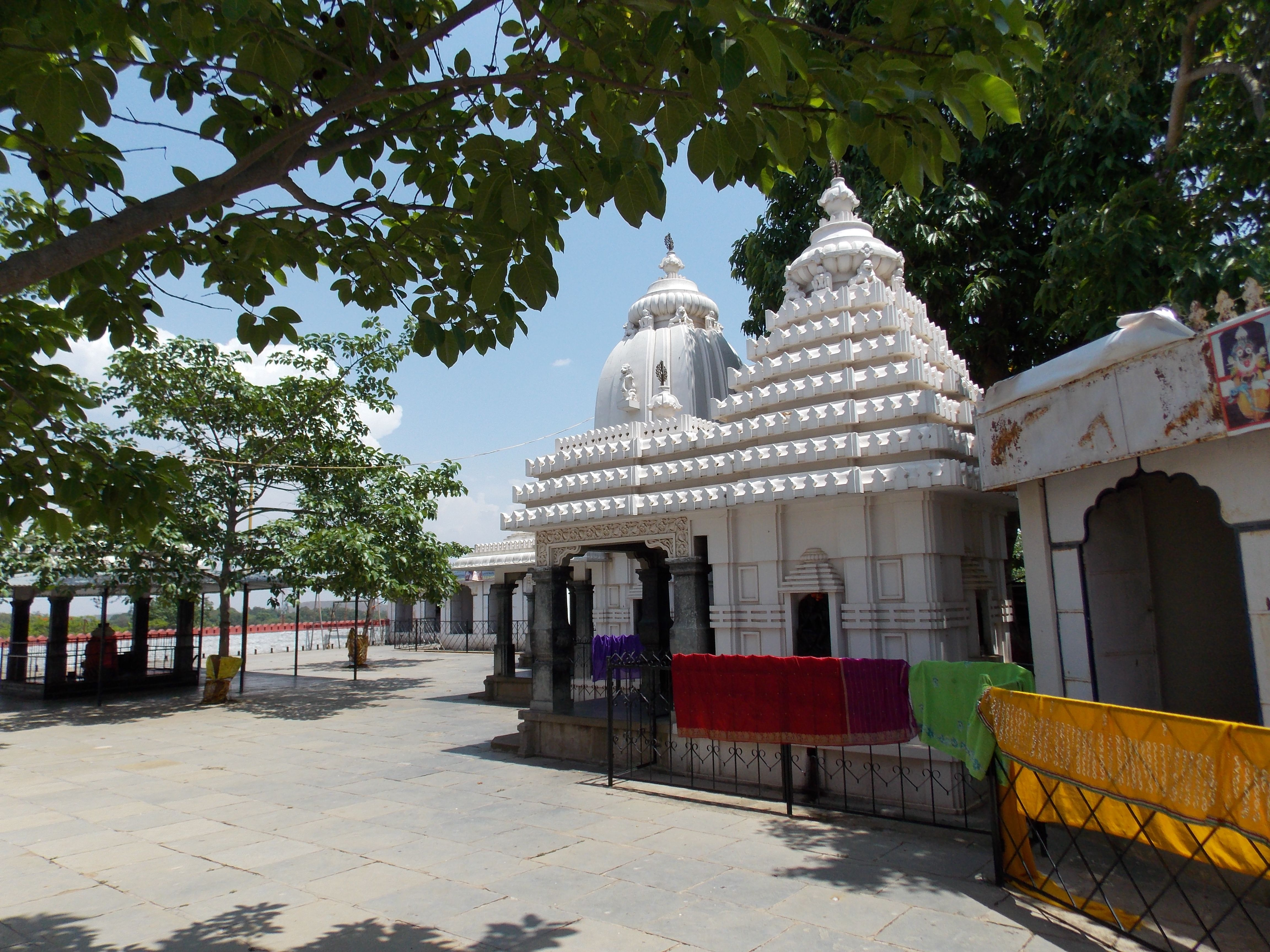
Jagannath Trmple at Koraput

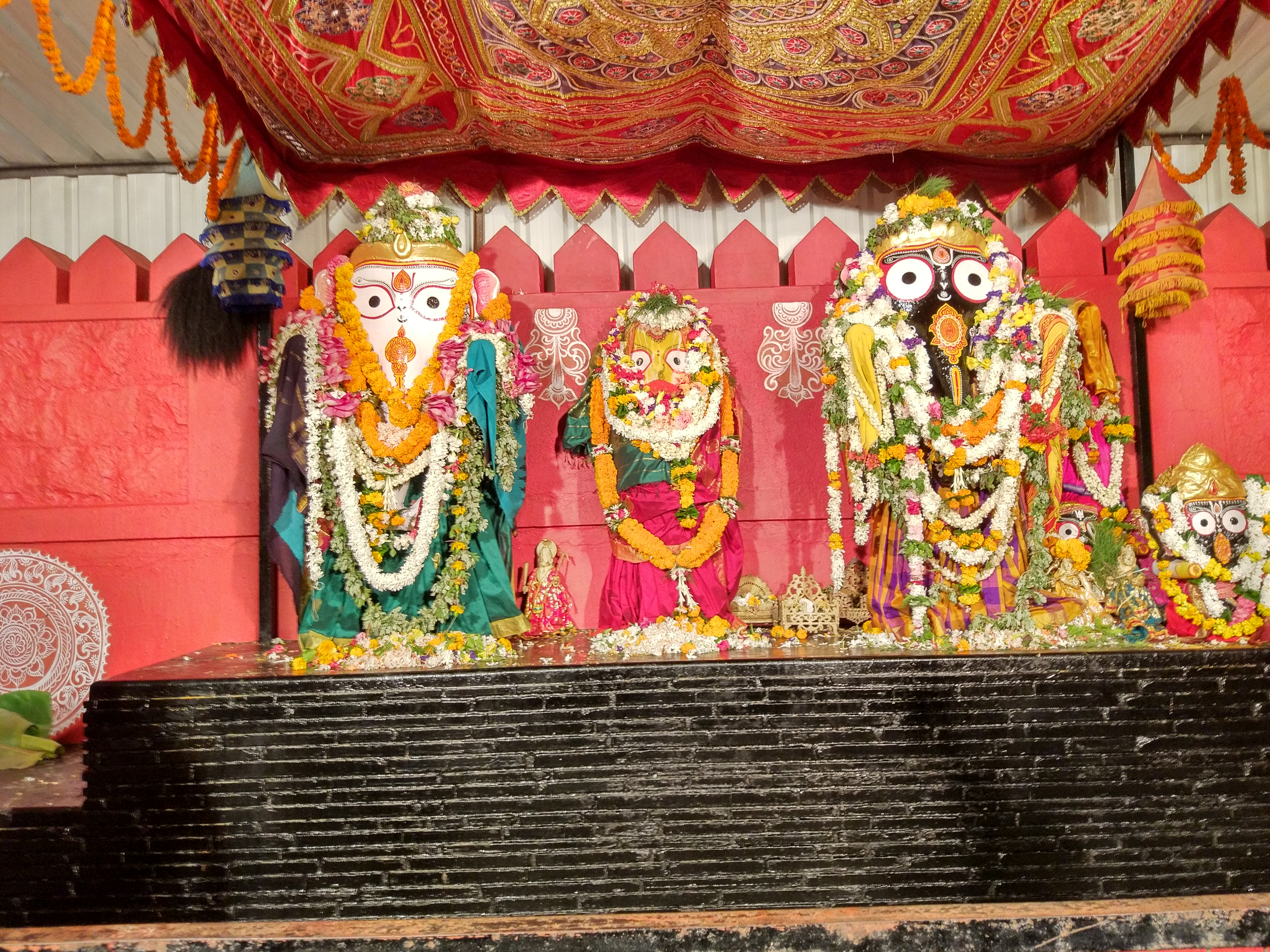
Jagannath, Balabhadra and Subhadra.

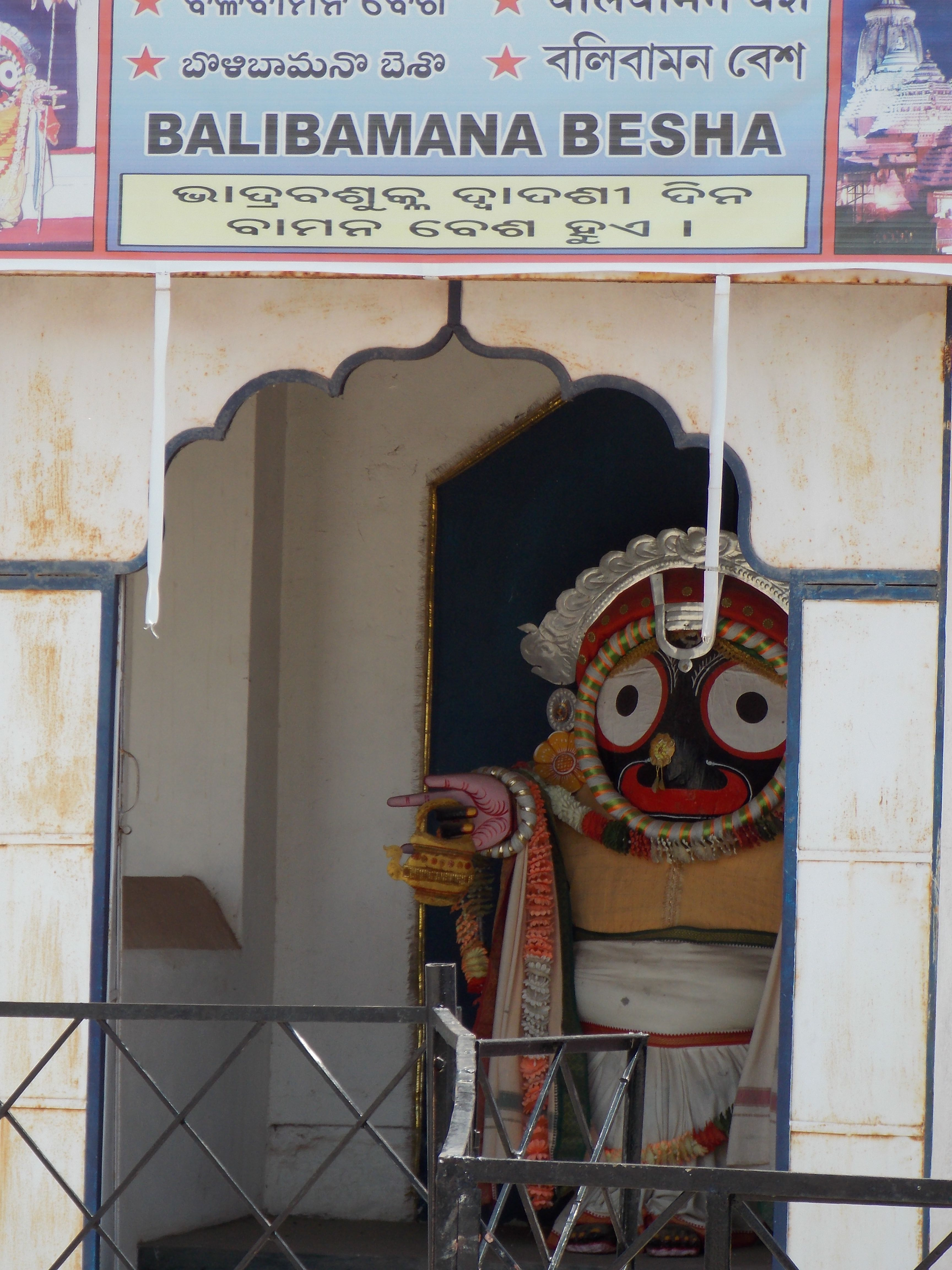
Balibamana Besha

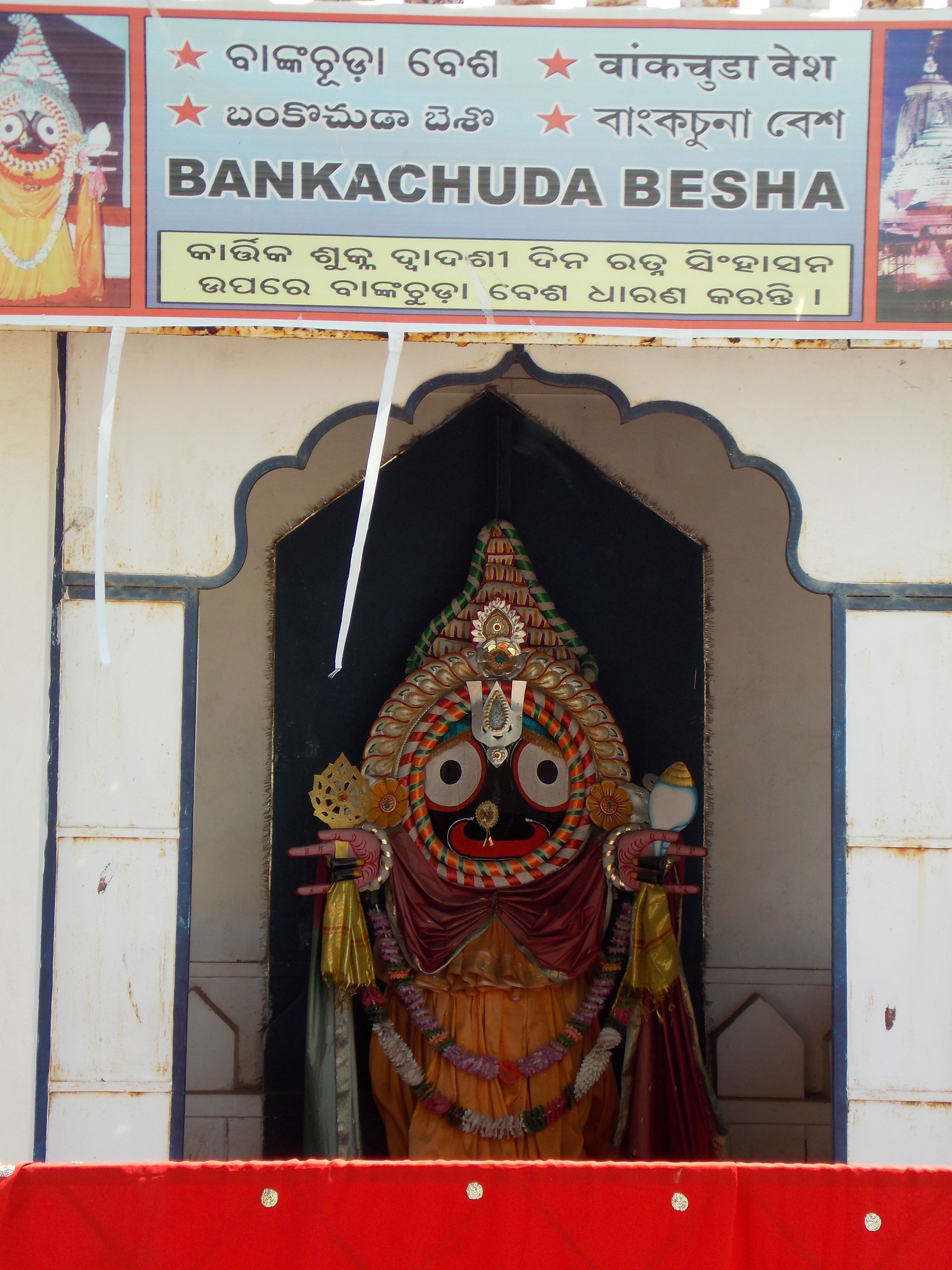
Bankachuda Besha

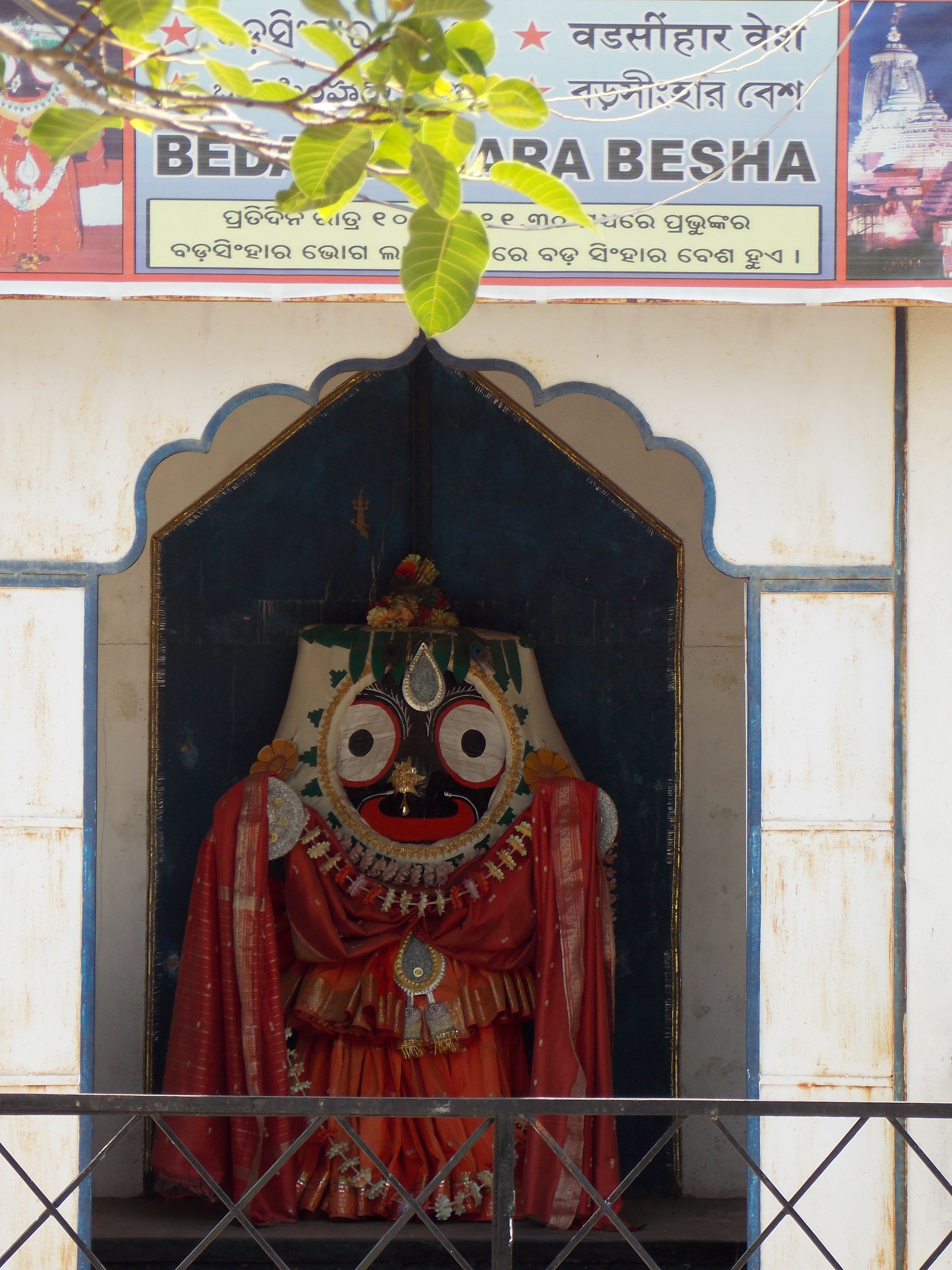
Bedasinghar Besha

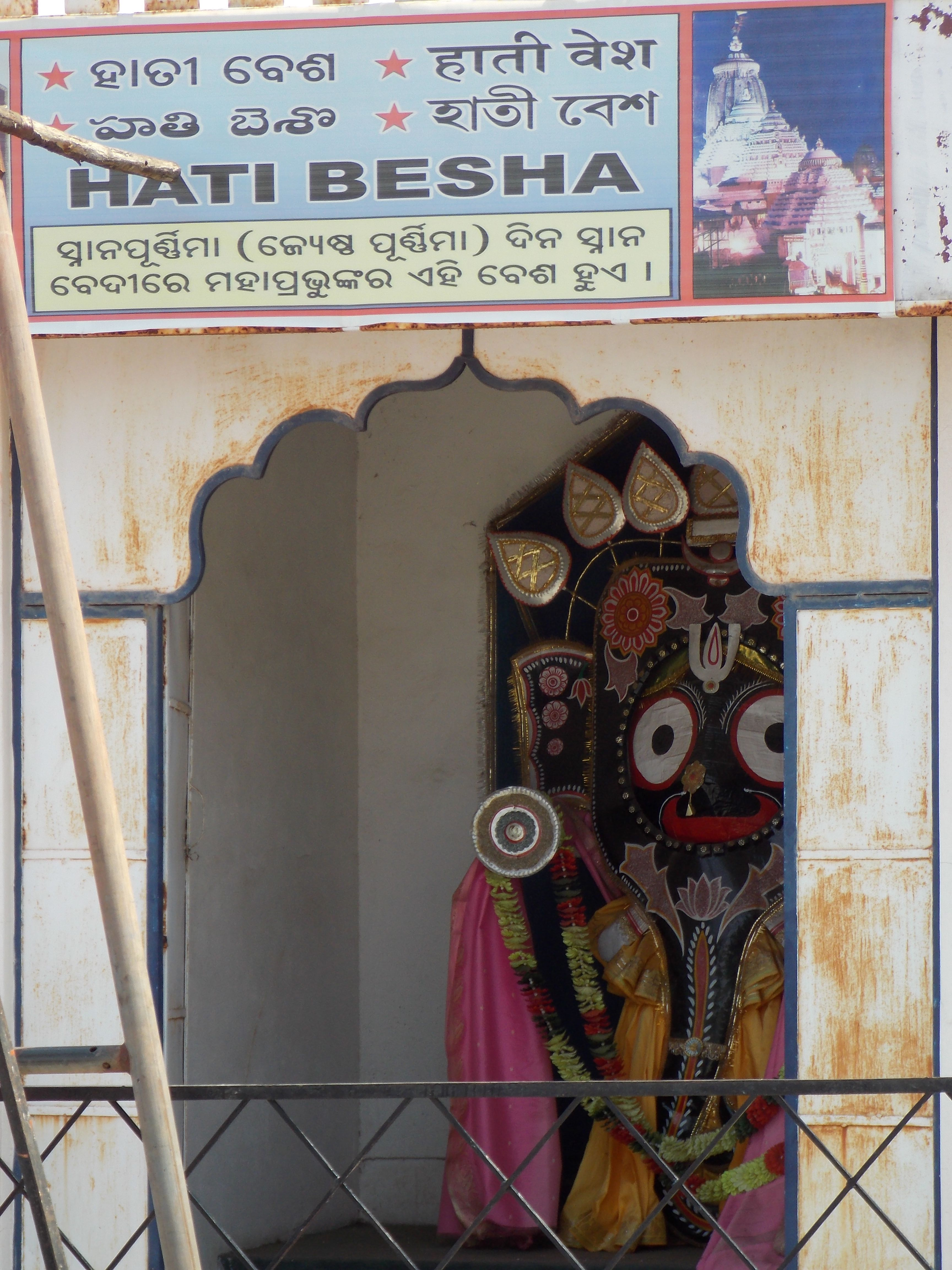
Hati Besha

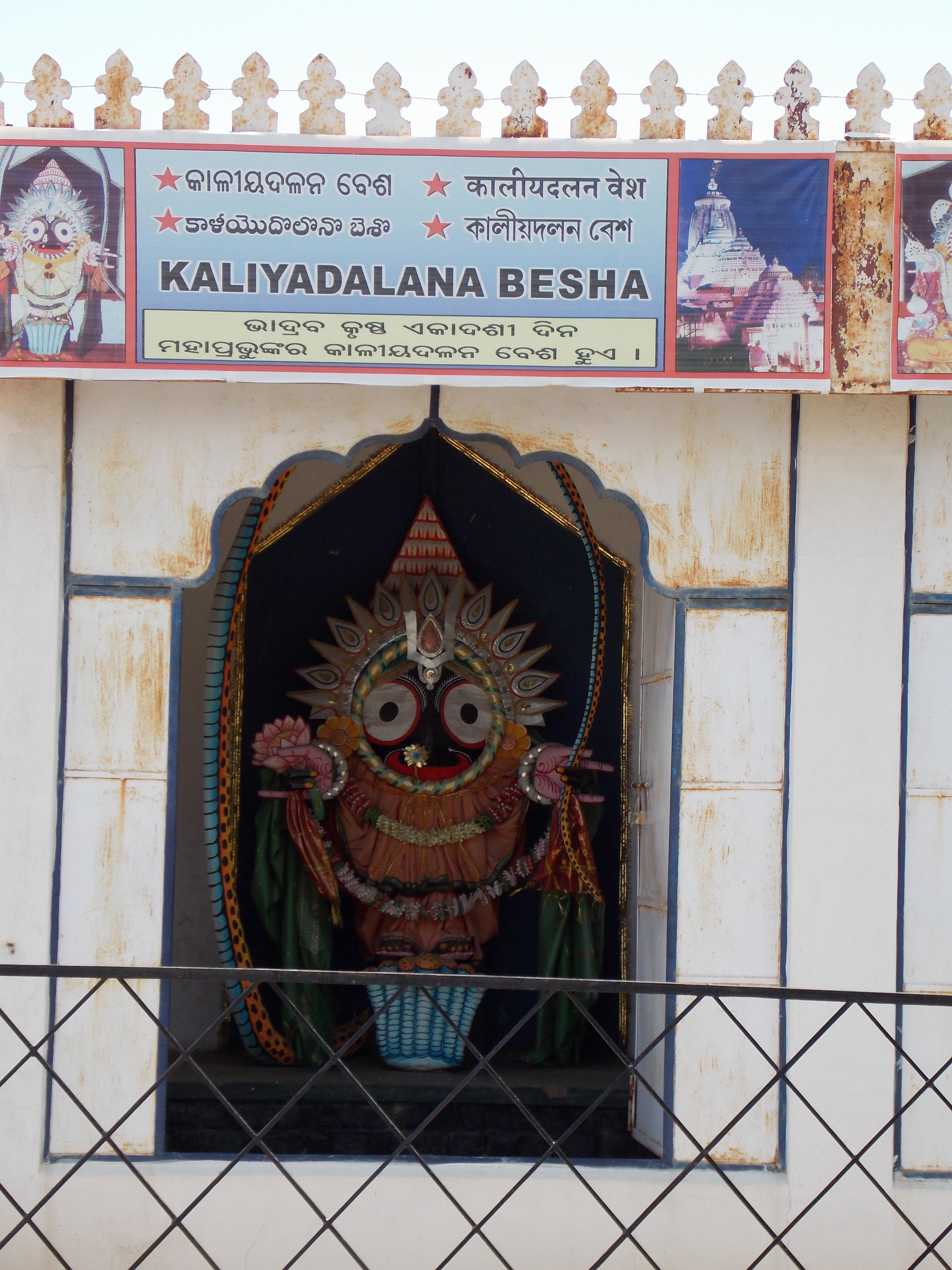
Kaliyadarana Besha

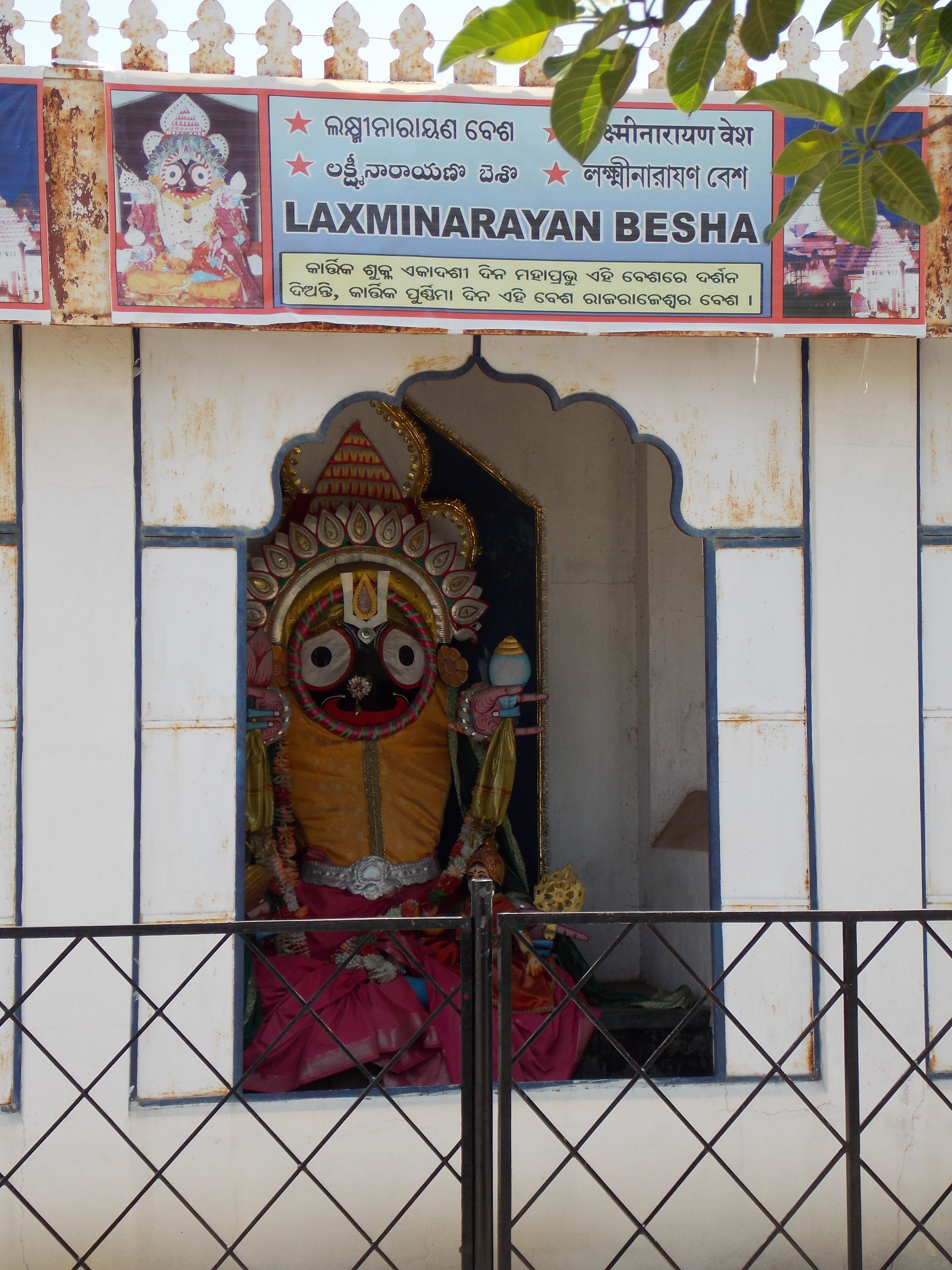
Laxminarayan Besha

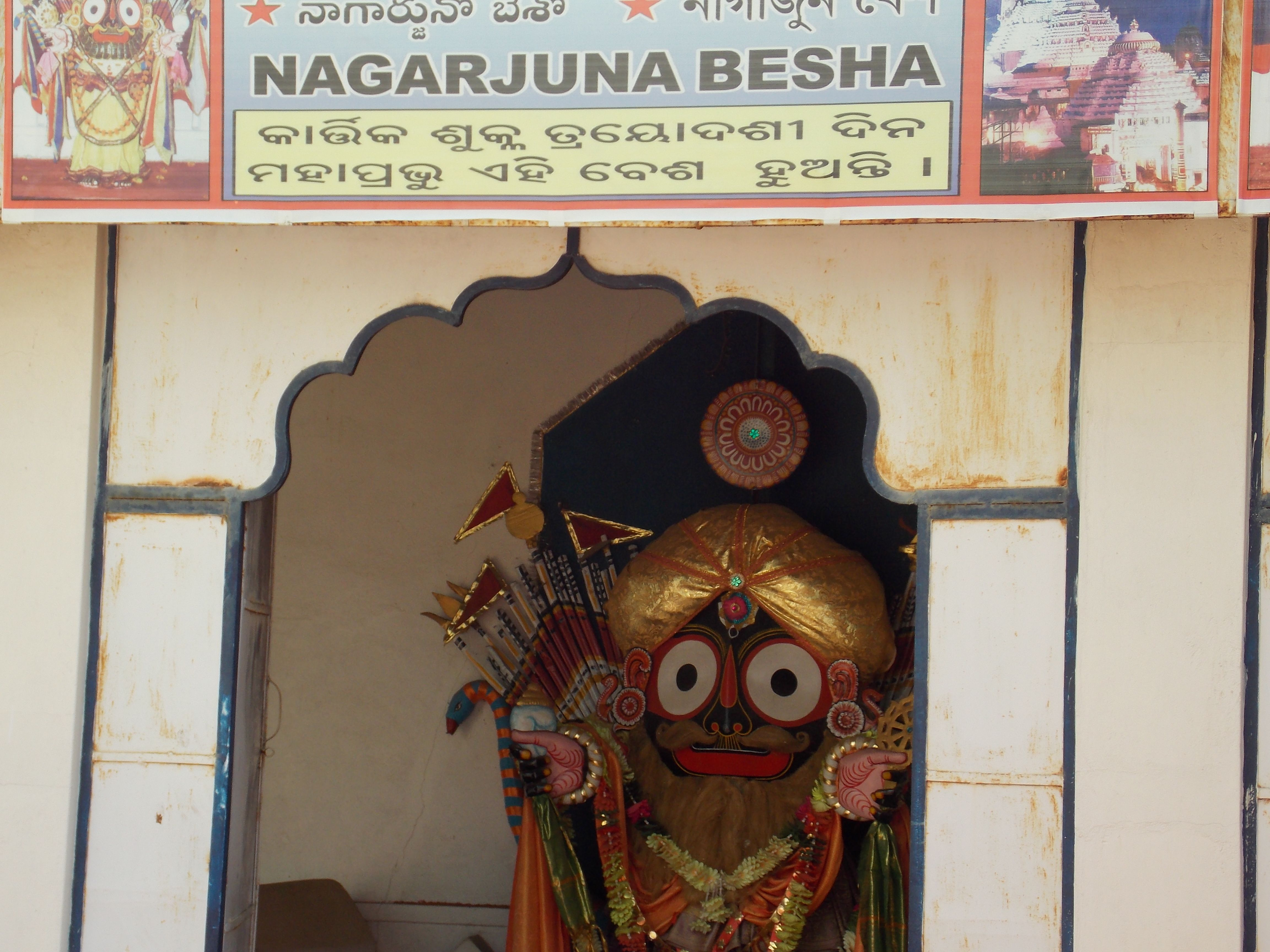
Nagajurna Besha

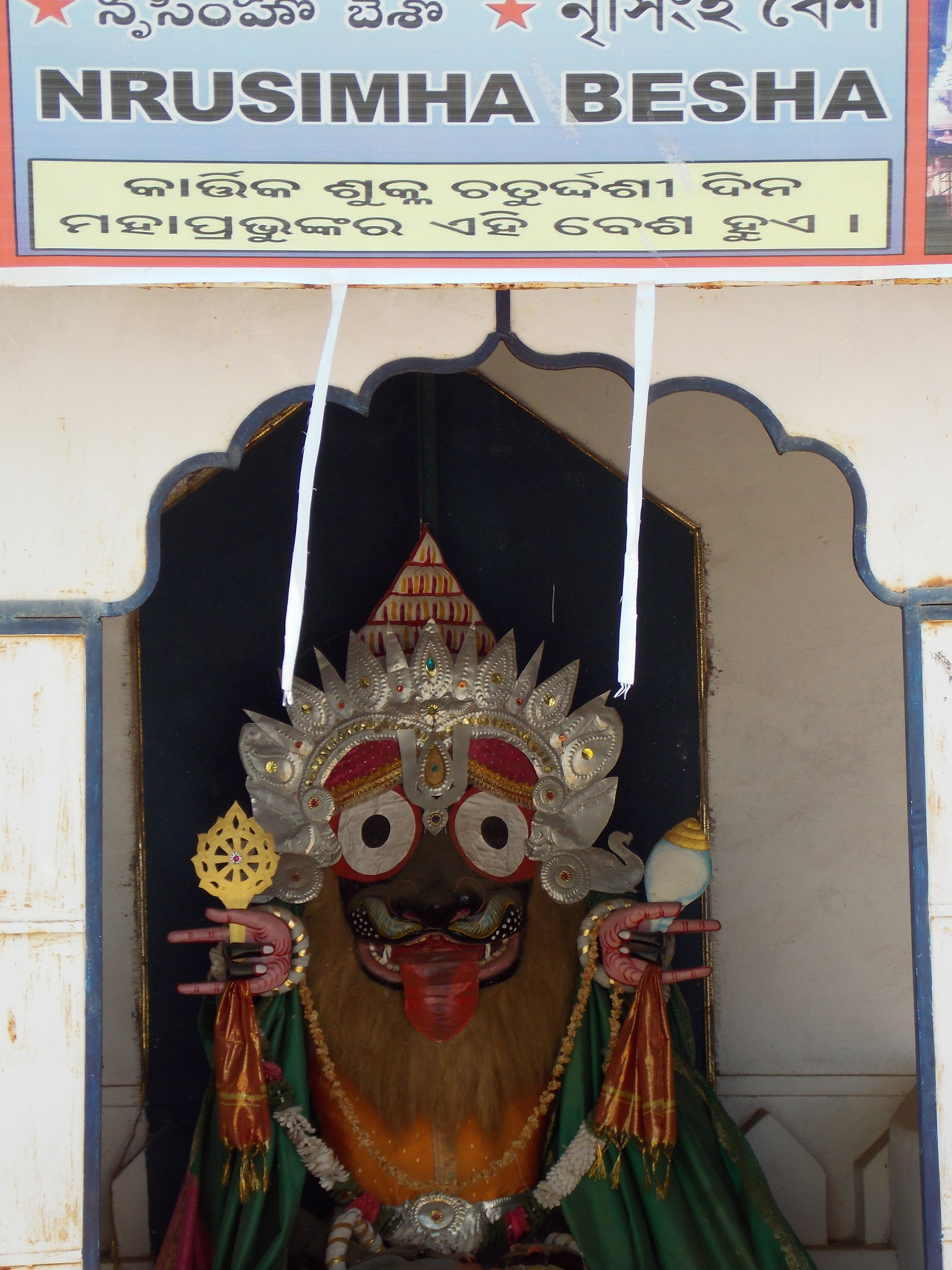
Nrusimha Besha

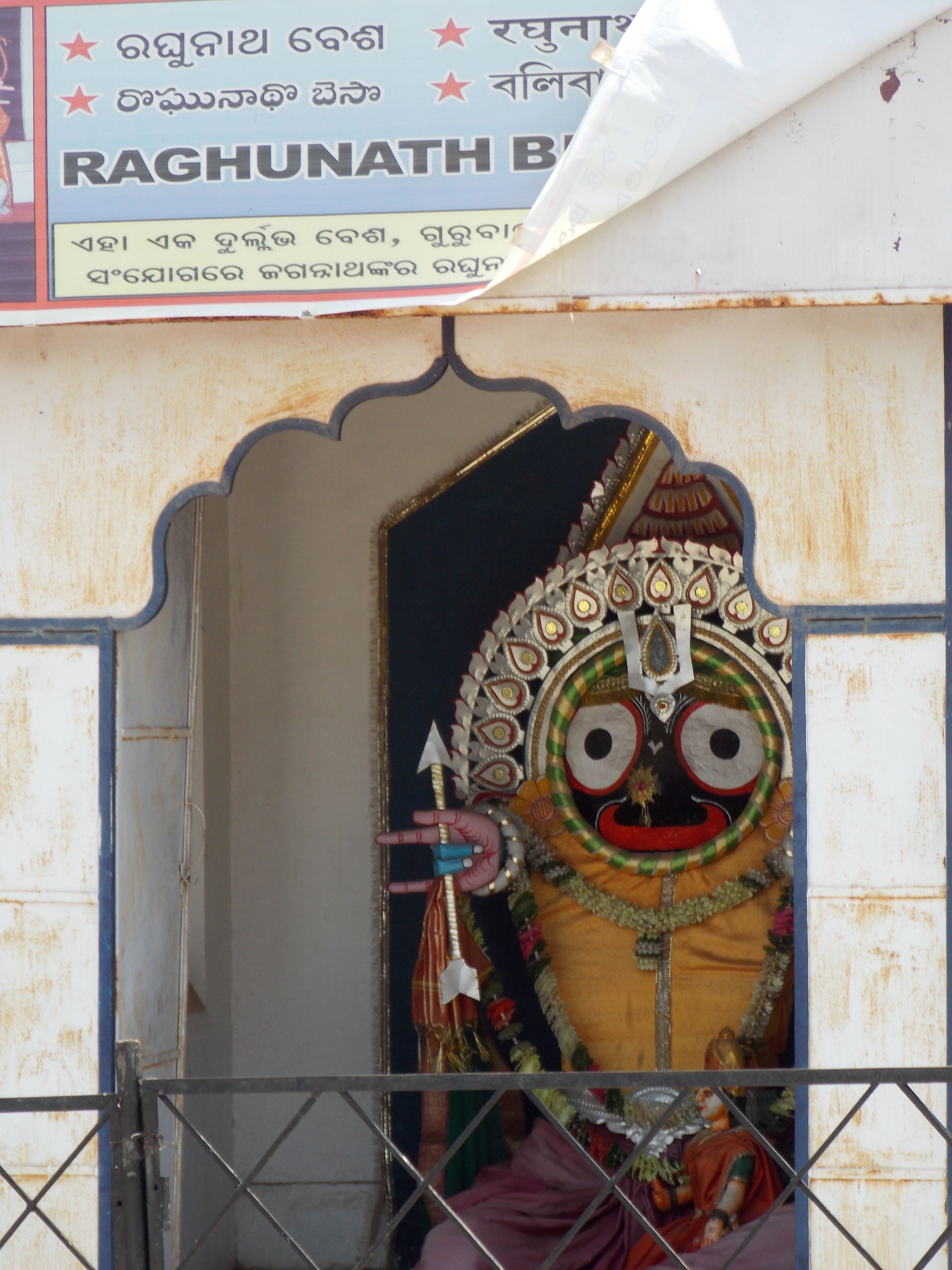
Raghunath Besha

== See also ==
- List of Jagannath temples outside Puri
- Patali Srikhetra
- Ananta Vasudeva Temple
- Baladevjew Temple
- Devadasi
- Juggernaut
