= Jagannath Temple, Delhi =

Hindu temple in India

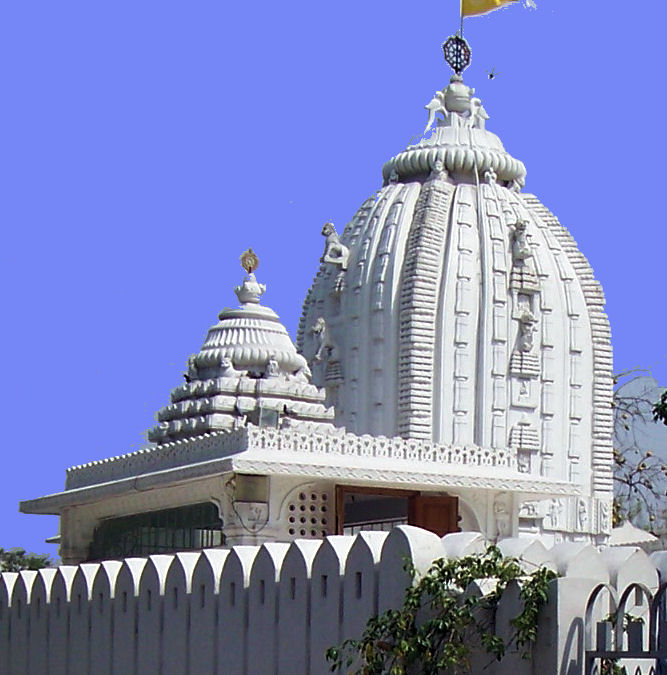
- The Jagannath Temple in Hauz Khas, Delhi, India

- Location within Delhi

Religion
- Affiliation: Hinduism
- District: Delhi
- Deity: Lord Jagannath

Location
- Location: C-Block, Safdarjung Deplopment Area, Bhagwan Jagannath Mg, Hauz Khas Vill- Rd, Hauz Khas, Delhi 110016
- State: Delhi
- Country: India
- Interactive map of Jagannath Temple, Delhi
- Coordinates: 28°33′15″N 77°11′59″E

Website
- https://jagannathmandirdelhi.com/

The Jagannath Temple in Delhi, India is a modern temple built by the Odia community of Delhi dedicated to the Hindu God Jagannath. The temple located in Hauz Khas is famous for its annual Rathyatra festival attended by thousands of devotees.

== Gallery ==
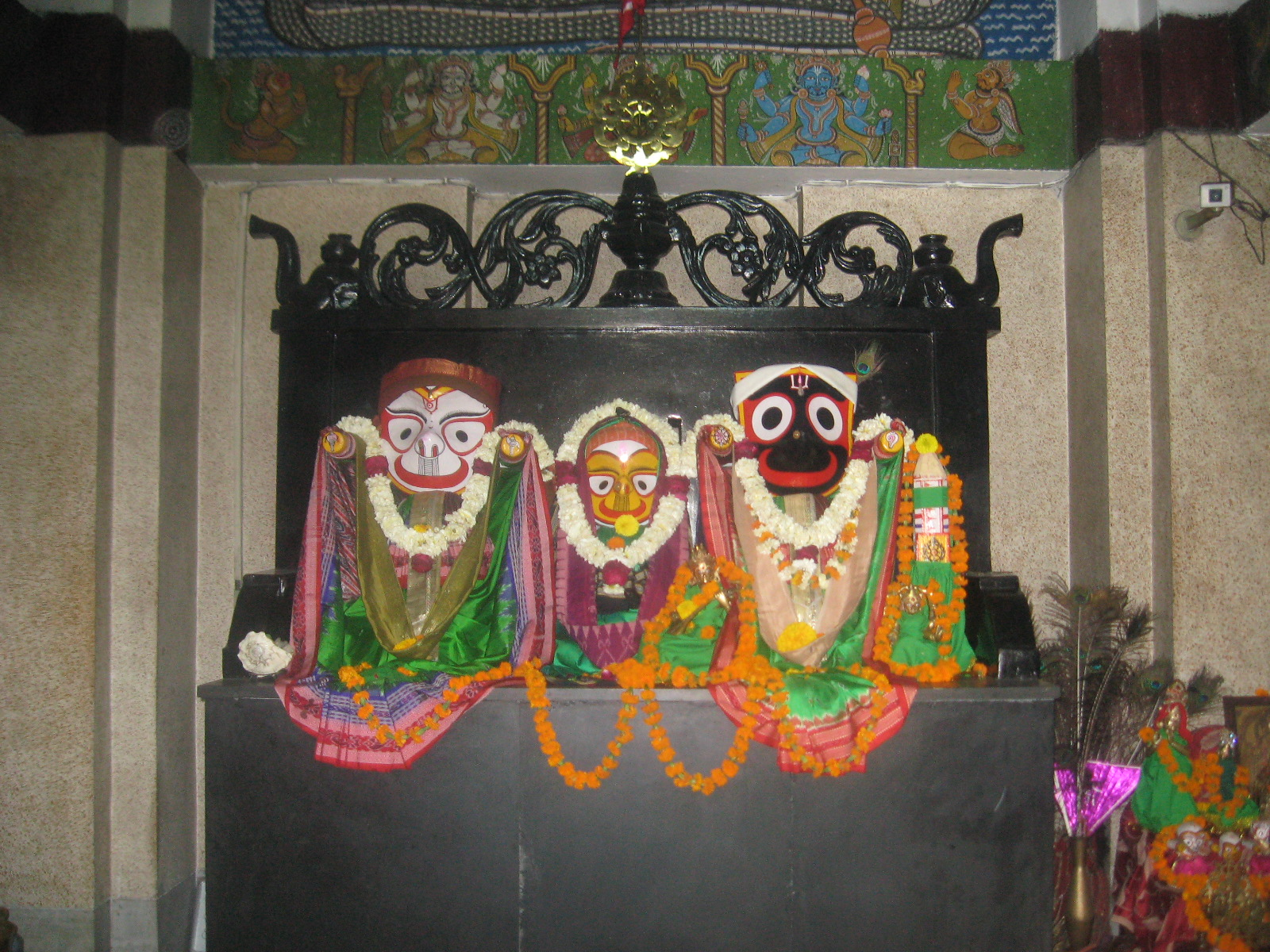
Deities inside the Hauz Khas Temple

Rath Yatra 2012

== See also ==
- List of Jagannath Temples outside Puri
