= Balabhadra =

Illustrious characters within Jainism

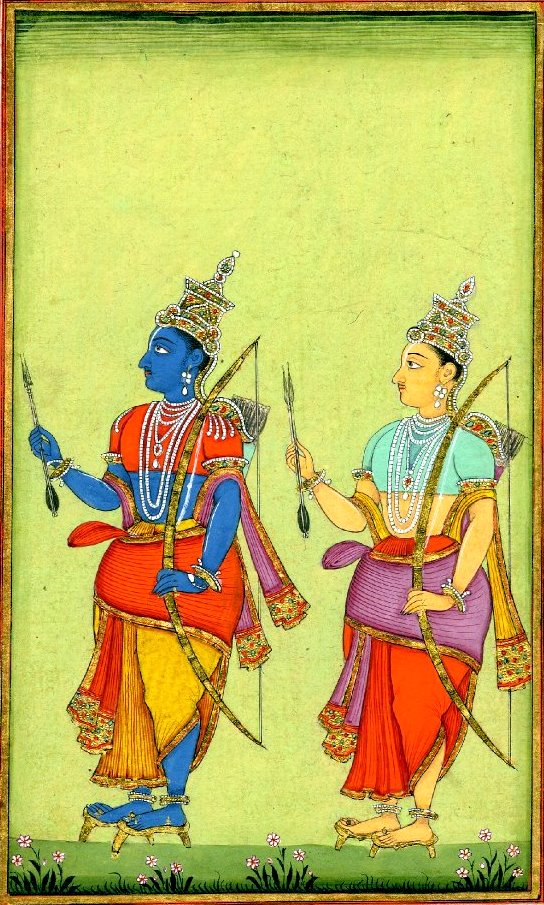
Rama and Lakshmana are the respective eighth set of the balabhadra and narayana in this half time cycle according to Jain universal history.

In Jainism, the Balabhadra or Baladeva are a set of nine non-violent heroes existent in every half cycle of time in Jain cosmology. Said to be among the sixty-three śalākāpuruṣa born in this world every Dukhama-sukhamā ara, they parallel the nine narayana (heroes who commit violent actions to achieve their goals) and nine pratinarayana (villains) concurrently born in said ara. Their life stories are said to be most inspiring, and the Jain puranas portray the Balabhadras as leading an ideal Jain life.

== Nine Balabhadras ==
According to the Digambaras, the nine Balabhadras of the present half cycle of time (avasarpini) are:

Acala	Bhadra	Balarama
Nandimitra	Nandisena	Rāma
Sudarśana	Suprabha	Vijaya
