= Nabakalebara 2015 =

Religious festival in Odisha, India

Nabakalebara
- Festival logo
- Genre: Religious
- Begins: 29 March 2015
- Ends: 17 July 2015
- Frequency: 19/8/12 years
- Locations: Jagannath Temple, Puri, Odisha
- Inaugurated: 1733
- Founder: Gajapati Ramachandra Deba (Abhinav Indradyumna)
- Previous event: 1996
- Next event: 17 July 2034
- Participants: Pilgrims
- Attendance: 5 million (approx.)
- Patron: Gajapati Maharaj Puri
- Website: nabakalebara.gov.in

The Nabakalebara 2015 is a celebration of the ancient ritual of the Nabakalebara associated with most of the Jagannath Temples when the idols of Lord Jagannath, Balabhadra, Subhadra and Sudarshan are replaced by a new set of idols; the last such festival of events was held in 1996. The period of the festival is chosen according to the Hindu Calendar, conforming to the astrological planetary positions. The festival during 2015 involves several schedules, and it has started from 23 March with Banajaga Yatra (a process of search to select the neem tree to make new images to replace the old ones) and will conclude with Rathayatra followed Sunabesa (adorning the new images of gods with golden attire) on 27 July, with many other rituals being held in between on specific dates. More than 5 million devotees are expected to participate in these rituals held in and around the temple complex of the Jagannath Temple, Puri, Odisha.

== History ==
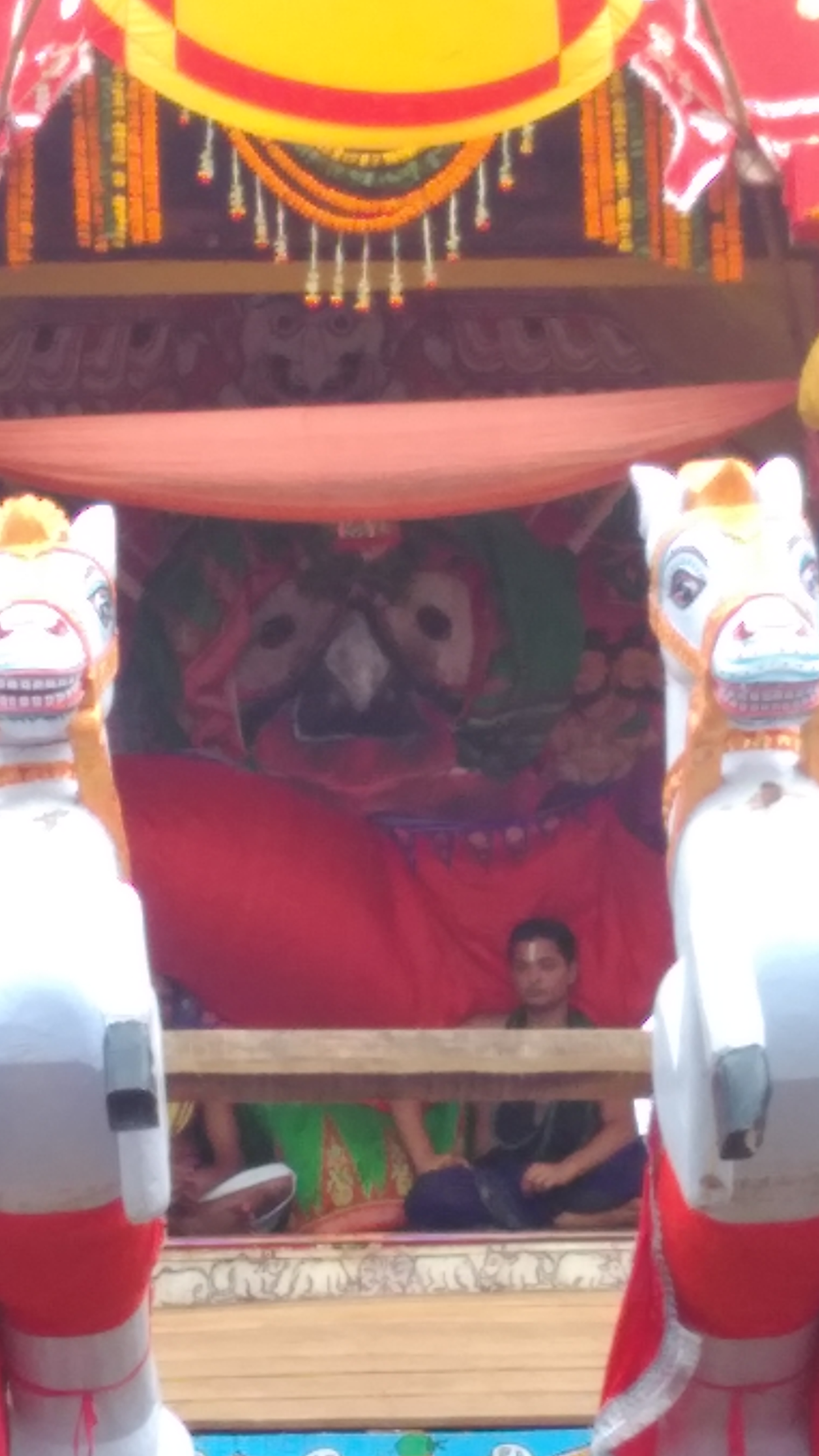
The idol of the new Jagannath or the Nabakalebara murti on the chariot during rathayatra in 2015

The exact year of origin of when the ritual Nabakalebara was started is not known. But on many occasions the deities had to be secretly buried or shifted from the temple when it was attacked by external forces. After the threat had passed the images, though retrieved, had to be made anew and reinstalled. One such recorded event was in 1600 when king Yajati is reported to have conducted this ritual after he had retrieved the images from Sonpur where they had been buried during an attack by Muslim invaders. When the wooden statues were unearthed by the king he found them in a state of decay and therefore got new images carved and installed on altar of the temple.

Another version of the history is that after Muslims invaded Odisha, the iconoclasts had burnt the images on the coast. Even the Afghan defied the command of Akbar and had desecrated the Jagannath temple. Following this Man Singh had captured Odisha in 1578. However, Besara Mohanty, a Vaishnava wandering saint had gathered the charred remains of the image, known as "Brahma padartha", and carried it to Kujang. Then, according to the Jagannath temple chronicle sources, Ramachandra Deb, Raja of Khurda, took the sacred remains from Kujang and sanctified it within the new image of Jagannath.

Nabakalebara festival is a much bigger and of longer duration than the annual Ratha Yatra at Puri According to Anncharlott Eschmann, it is a Sanskritized version of a tribal ritual of the Khond tribes. It is said that "proto-types" of this ceremony are practiced by the Kond.

The festival rituals are held over a long period of 65 days to replace the old images known as "Daru Brahma", meaning Brahma (divine life force) in the shape of wood, of Lord Jagannath, Lord Balabhadra, Goddess Subhadra and Sudarshana, by new ones made of neem tree wood.; the search for the appropriate neem Daru Brahma wood, its carriage to the carving site precedes the start of the Nabakalebara festival. It is begun in the Hindu calendar month of Chaitra Shukla Dashami (10th day of bright half of Lunar month) day.

The rituals are held when an Adhikamasa (intercalary month) of Ashadha (June/July), when two lunar months of Ashadha (four lunar fortnights) fall in one year, as per the Hindu Calendar. Such a rare occasion usually occurs once in 12 years, but the gap may range from eight to 19 years. In the 20th century, Nabakalebara was celebrated in 1912, 1931, 1950, 1969, 1977 and 1996. In the 21st century, the first Nabakalebara is being held for a period starting from 29 March 2015 and ending with Niladribije on 30 July as per schedule announced by the temple administration. Lord Jagannatha who is a central figure of the rituals is worshipped in the Jagannath Temple, Puri as the king of the Universe. He is hierarchically number one in the realm, while the maharaja Gajapati of Puri holds the second position and is the chief servitor of the temple. The maharaja would present gifts to Jagannath but also receive gifts from representatives of feudatory kings, and his jurisdiction extended to tribal areas. To the people of Puri, the gods took the unusual form of huge wooden stumps, since they had lived with the tribal people. While the king got the images deified in a Hindu temple after elaborate religious ceremonies of the Nabakalebara, its tribal incomplete form, called "virupa" was retained but encased with cloth and resin. As the images are made of wood they would inevitably rot, similar to the human beings, and need replacement. It is this replacement which is performed with elaborate rituals called Nabakalebara. Navakalevara meaning "New Body or re-embodiment" is a composite of two words ‘Nava’ meaning "New" and ‘Kalevara’ meaning "Body". It is only the body of the gods that is changed during the rituals as it would be deteriorate with time but the Brahman or the "Brahmapadartha (soul-substance)" within the wooden body (called "Daru Brahma" or the "Prime-Soul enshrined in wood") is transferred from the old images to the new through a secret religious rigmarole.

== Program schedule ==
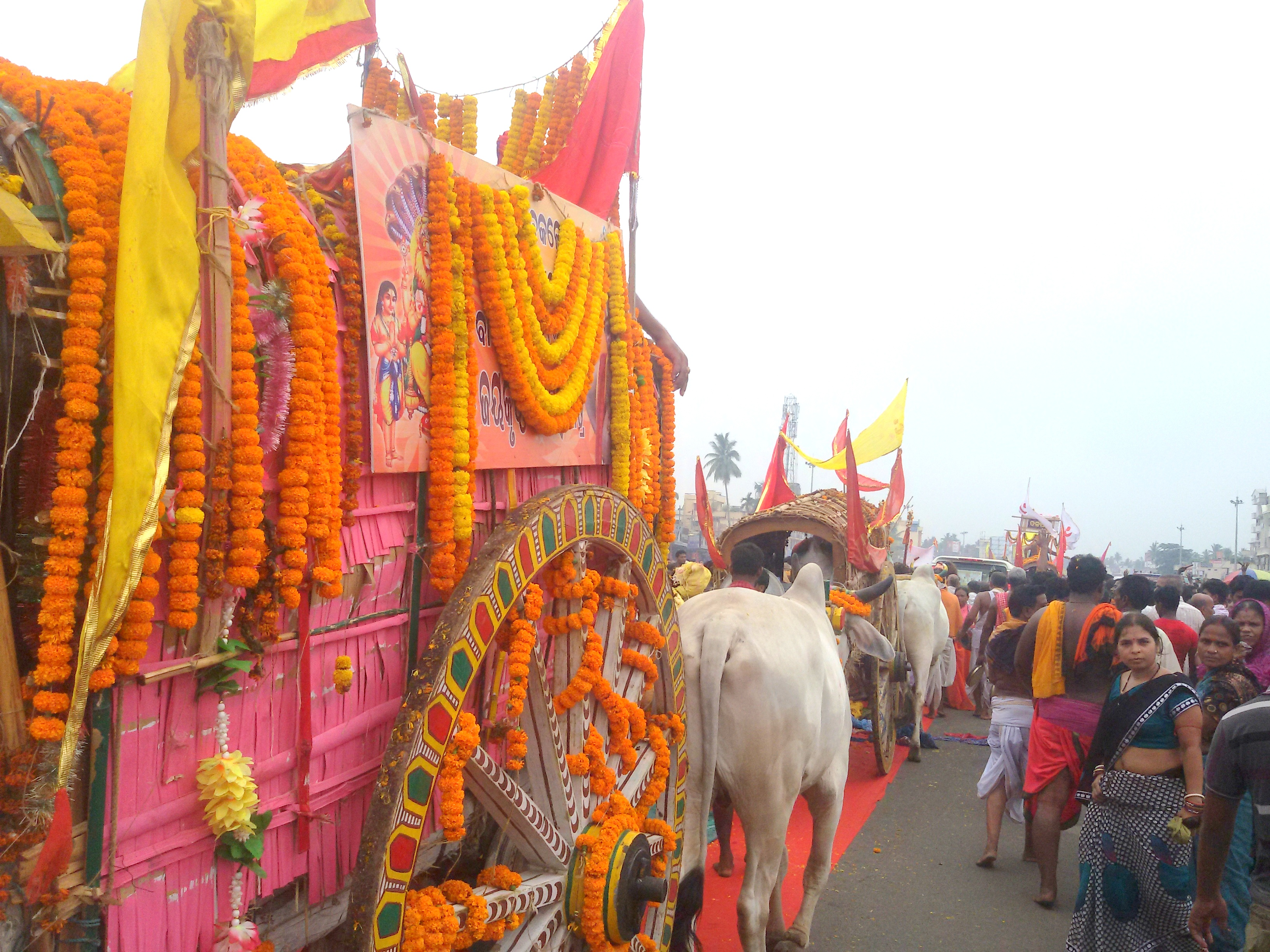
The carts to transport the holy darus on their way to the Banajaga Yatra

The Nabakalebara 2015 rituals were held as per the following schedule.

- 29 March 2015, Sunday: Banajaga Yatra.
- 30 March 2015, Monday: Journey to Deuli Matha. Daitapati's will leave Jagannath Ballava Ashram and will stay at Nua river Bank Ashram.
- 2 April 2015, Thursday: Stay at Deuli Matha.
- 3 April 2015, Friday: Worship at Kakatpur Mangala temple.
- 4 April (Saturday) to 17 May 2015 (Sunday): Explore Daru.
- 2 June 2015, Tuesday: Debasnana Purnima.
- 5 June 2015, Friday: Carving of images.
- 15 June 2015, Monday: Transfer of Brahma at midnight.
- 17 July 2015, Friday: Naba jaubana darshan.
- 18 July 2015, Saturday: Rath Yatra.
- 22 July 2015, Wednesday: Hera Panchami.
- 26 July 2015, Sunday: Bahuda Yatra.
- 27 July, Monday: Sunabesa.
- 28 July 2015, Tuesday: Adhara Niti.
- 30 July 2015, Thursday: Niladribije.

== Key events ==
Some key events of the rituals before, during and after the Nabakalebara 2015 such as Banajaga Yatra, Debasnana Purnima, Netroutsav, Navajoubana besha, Rath Yatra and Sunabesa are detailed.

=== Banajaga Yatra ===
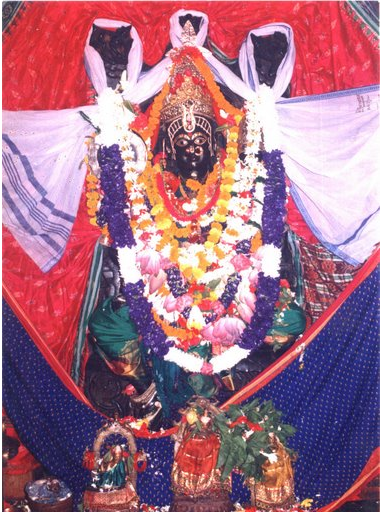
Daityas seek divine blessings of Goddess Kakatpur Mangala at Her temple, to give indications to the location of neem trees for making the idols of Lord Jagannath and other deities

Banajaga Yatra (pronounced as Banajāga Jātra) precedes the main events of Nabakalebara. This yatra or expedition is an expedition undertaken to locate the holy trees or "darus" from which the new idols of the gods are to be carved. This task is entrusted to the rightful daityas, spelled locally as daitas, who are servitors of the temple deities. After offering prayers and performing prescribed rituals, the team of daityas (usually about 100) headed by a leader called the "Dalapati" go to the palace of the maharaja Gajapati, who is the chief servitor of the Jagannath Temple, seeking his permission to undertake the journey to find the suitable trees for carving new images of each of the four deities. The King gives them permission by offering them betel nut, in the presence of his Rajaguru or chief priest. The team of daityas, led by their leader walk barefoot about 50 km and halt at Deuli Matha on the first day and then proceed to the Kakatpur Mangala Temple to offer prayers. Four daityas (senior servitors) sleep in front of the goddess seeking divine guidance on the location of the neem trees.

The servitors then proceed in search of the neem trees appropriate for each of the deities in accordance with the prescribed signs, size, and locations. After selection of the trees they are worshipped, covered with white cloth and then felled. They are then carried on wooden carts in a long procession through villages accompanied by beating of drums and cymbals to the venue of a temporary carving shed in the Koili Baikuntha near the temple. Here, worship is done to the neem logs every day and prasad food offering given till the Debasnana Purnima day.

During 2015, the Banajaga Yatra commenced from Puri on 29 March. Announcement about the location of the daru (neem tree) for Lord Sudarshana was made around midnight on Saturday, 11 April 2015.

=== Collection of darus ===
- Daru for lord Sudarshana identified at Garh Kuntunia village near Balakati on the outskirts of Bhubaneswar.
- The daru of Lord Balabhadra was found near Sarala Temple, Jhankada in Jagatsinghpur district.
- The location of daru of Goddess Subhadra was announced on Friday, 24 April 2015. It was found at the Nilakantheswar Temple in Adhangagada under Biridi block in Jagatsinghpur district.
- On 29 April, the location of Lord Jagannath's daru was announced to be Kharipadia under Raghunathpur block in Jagatsinghpur district.

=== Significance of daru trees ===
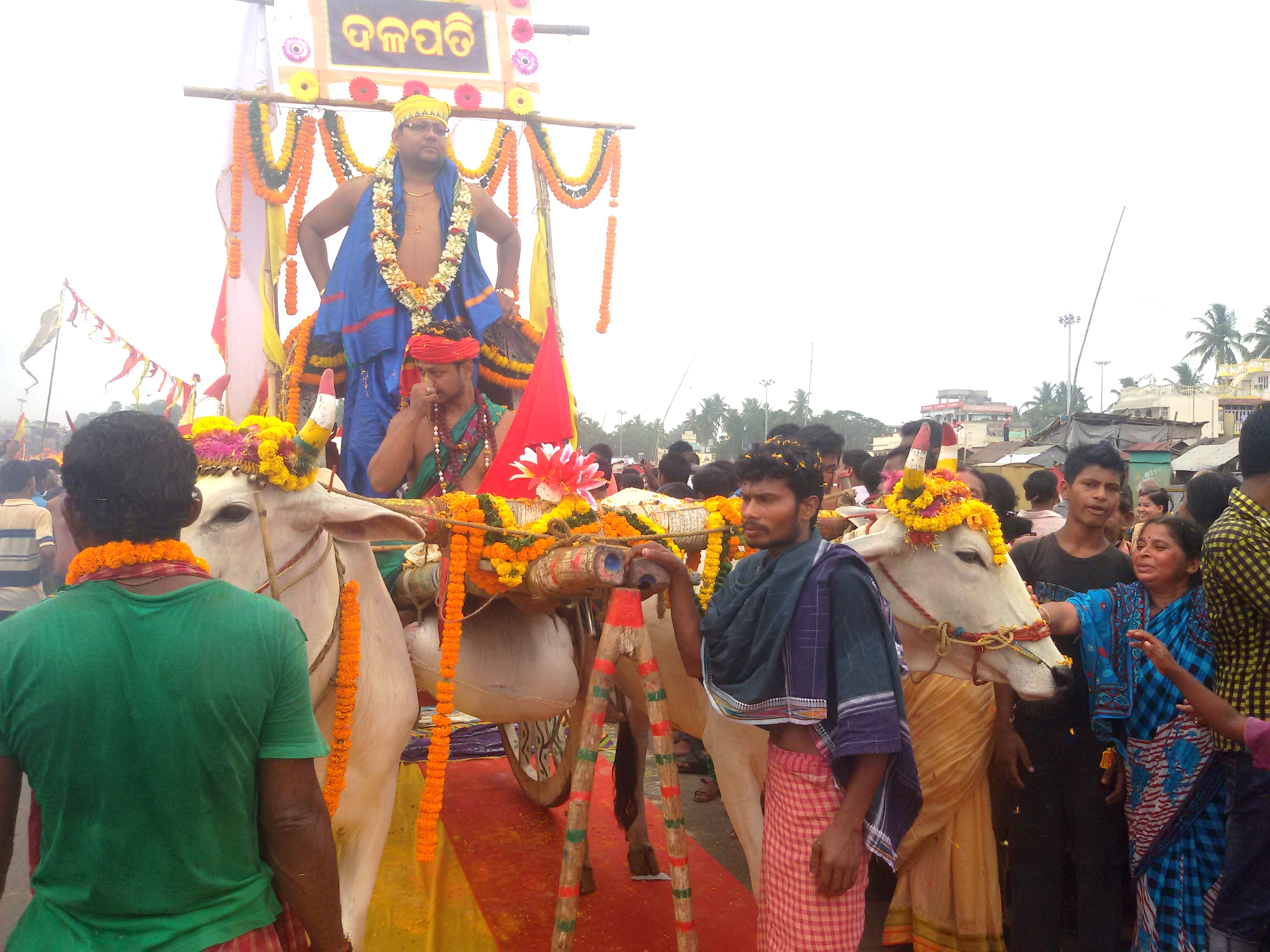
The Jagannath daru on the way to the temple

The daru of Jagannath

The tree selected for Jagannath daru should ordinarily be away from human settlement. It should look dark or dark-red in colour. The trunk of the tree should look straight having four clear branches. The tree, furthermore, should be 7 to 12 cubit high and should have grown near a river or a pond or on a crossing of 3 path-ways.

The daru of Balabhadra

The bark of the tree for Balabhadra should look light brown in color. The tree needs to have seven branches looking like the form of a canopy and the hood of a cobra. The tree should have the divine marks of a plough, pestle and the weapons of Balabhadra.

The daru of Goddess Subhadra

The tree meant for Goddess Subhadra should look yellow in colour. It should have five clear branches and bear the mark of a lotus flower with five petals.

The daru of Sudarsan

The tree meant for Sudarsan should be reddish in colour. It should have three branches. There should be a mark of a Chakra on any part of the tree. The tree should also have a depression in the middle.

=== Debasnana Purnima ===
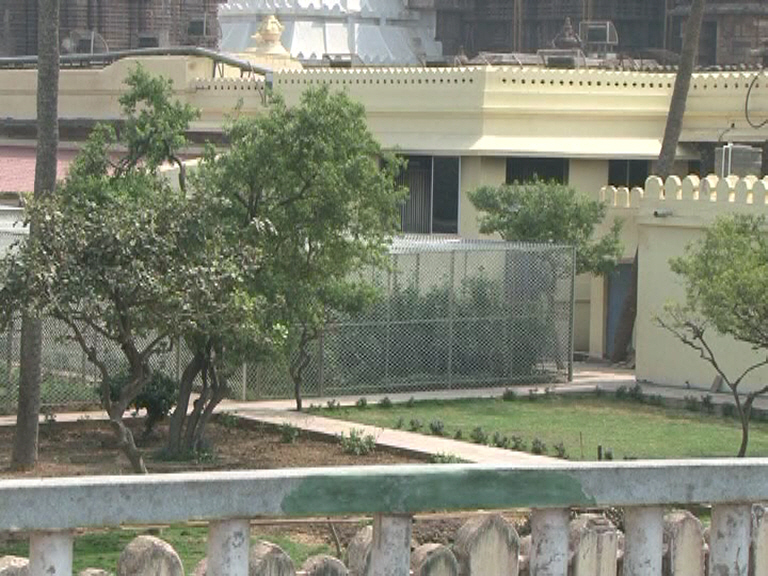
Koili Baikuntha where the deities were buried and Brahma Paribartan happened

As the arrival of the new logs called Nyasa Daru in the precincts of the temple is made known, the maharaja offers oblations at the Jagannath temple (also known as Shri Kshetra) before the carving of the idols is started; the king appoints one of his Rajaguru as the chief priest for this occasion. The logs are given a bath on this day which is called Snana Poornima or Debasnana Purnima. Concurrently old idols in the temple are also bathed for the final time. Following this the temple is closed for devotees. This is known as the period of Mahaanasara in the two Ashada months, extending to 45 days. The first 15 days of this period is the lunar dark half month (Krishna paksha) designated to start the carving of new images. Then the process of carving of the images of the four deities begins, which is done by fifty maharanas (carpenters) over a period of 21 days. On completion of the carvings the new images are circumambulated around the temple. Following this the new and the old images are kept at one place facing each other to initiate the process of transfer of Brahmapadartha embedded in the heart of old idols to the new images. This is done in total secrecy at the midnight hour. Even the priests who perform this task are blindfolded as it is a belief that any one watching this transfer would die. On this occasion there is black out in the entire town. The event was slated to be conducted within the sanctum sanctorum of the Jagannath temple at the midnight hour of 15 June 2015. In between, the alternative pilgrimage site at Alarnatha Mandira temple of Brahmagiri witnessed throngs of Hindus making their visit, larger than during normal years.

Once the transfer of the Brahmapadartha (soul-substance)) is completed the old images were officially declared dead. Then these images are carried along with all the secondary deities kept in the chariots and buried at the Koili Baikuntha. This is done as Lord Jagannath is considered to the head of the family of the Daitapati servitors. After the burial (known as "Patali", during the second fortnight of the Mahanasara period) the funeral obsequies are observed by the daityas for 10 days followed by bathing and a tonsure haircut. A feast is then held on the 12th day and Mahaprasad distributed to the returning devotees.

On completion of the funeral obsequies to the old images, the new images of the four deities are given a protective cover with "Saptavarana" meaning seven substances such as sandalwood paste, musk, resin, silk and so forth. The artists then paint the images with indigenous colours. This activity is done during the last fortnight of the Mahaanasara period.

== Netrotsava ==
After the images are painted, the eyelids of the deities are formally opened in a ritual known as "Netrotsava" meaning "opening of the eyes". This is done exclusively by the Brahmin priests of the temple as a "final life-infusing ritual." This was scheduled to be done on 16 July 2015. On the day after the images are infused with life they are taken in a procession for viewing by the public, which is called "Naba jaubana darshan" (viewing of the new images).

== Rathayatra ==
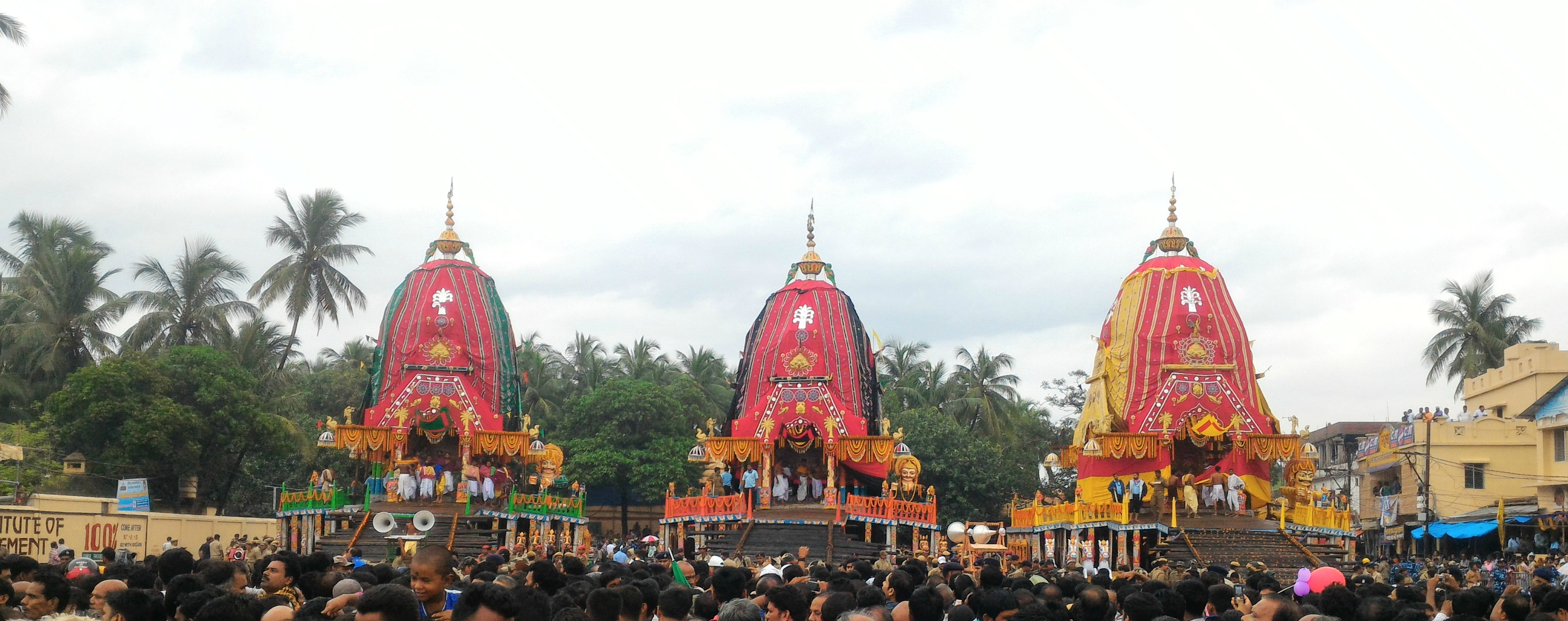
Rathyatra during Nabakalebara 2015

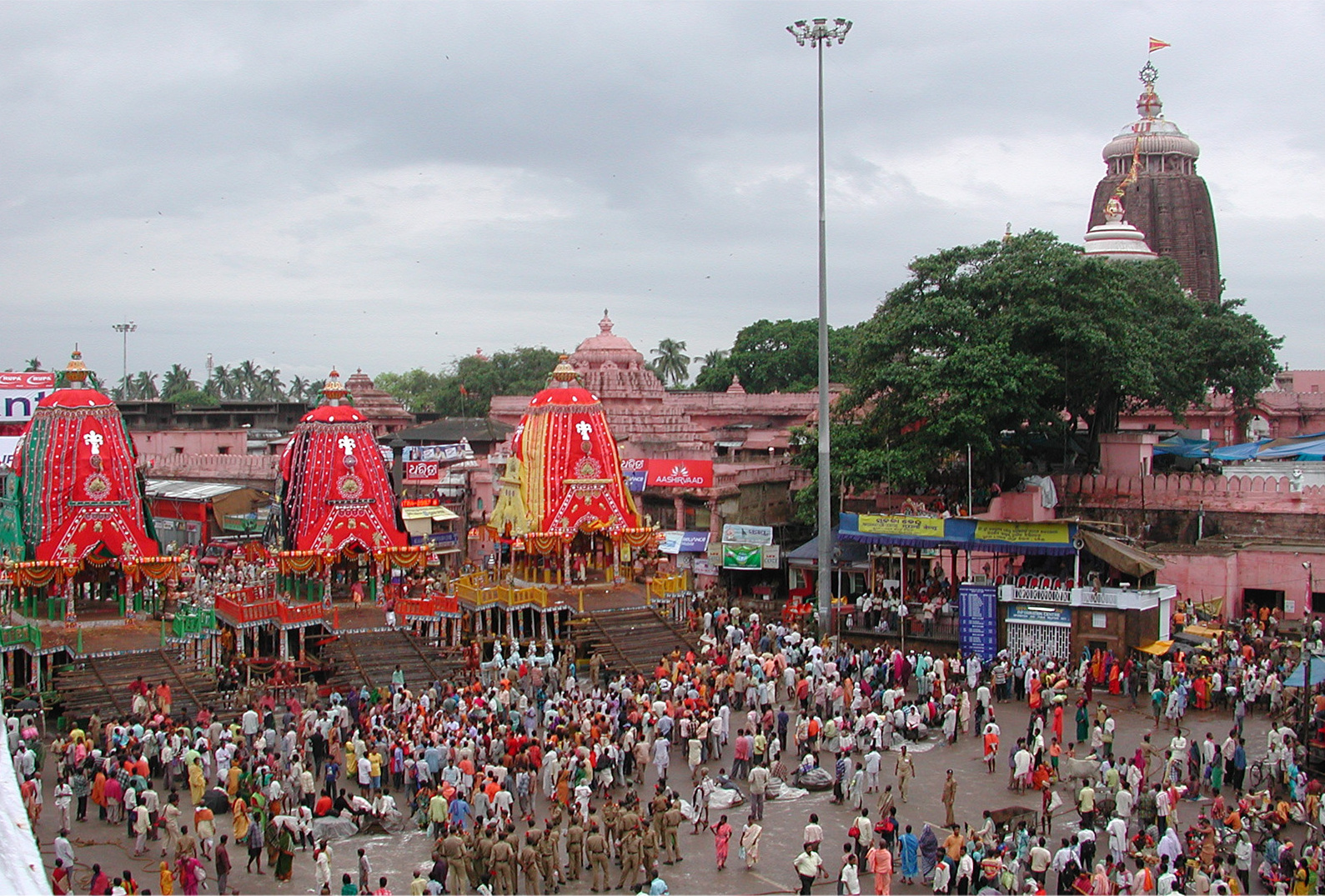
Rathayatra of the three deities of the Jagannath Temple that is held every year at Puri.

After the Naba jaubana darshan held on 17 July, the deities will be brought out the next day for the Rathayatra, which is a grand annual event. The process of building three new chariots to carry the three deities of the temple has already started from the Basant Panchami day on 24 January 2015. The new images, which are a replica of the old ones which are buried, will be on display for public viewing at the chariot festival which will be held in Puri.

=== Sunabesa ===
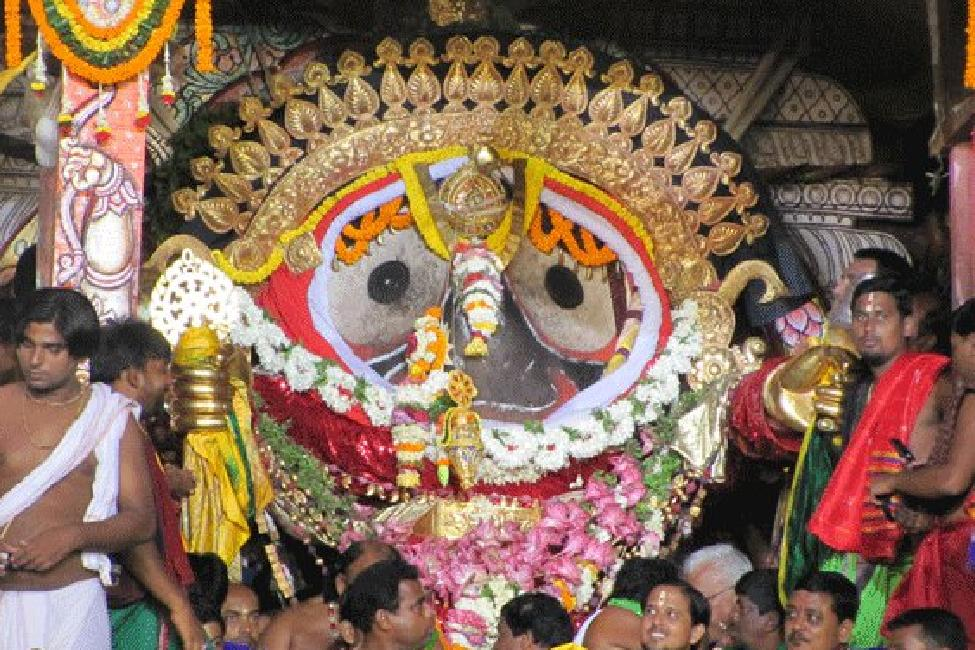
Suna Besha or golden attire of Lord Jagannath.

The Sunabesa or Suna Besha is an event that is held on the third day of the Rathayatra when the deities reach the Singhdwar they will be seen decorated with golden ornaments. This was held on 27 July. The gold ornaments are stated to be a donation by King Kapilendra Deb. Initially, ornaments consisted of 135 designs weighing about 208 kg but now only 20-30 designs are used to decorate the deities.
