= List of festivals observed at Jagannatha Temple, Puri =

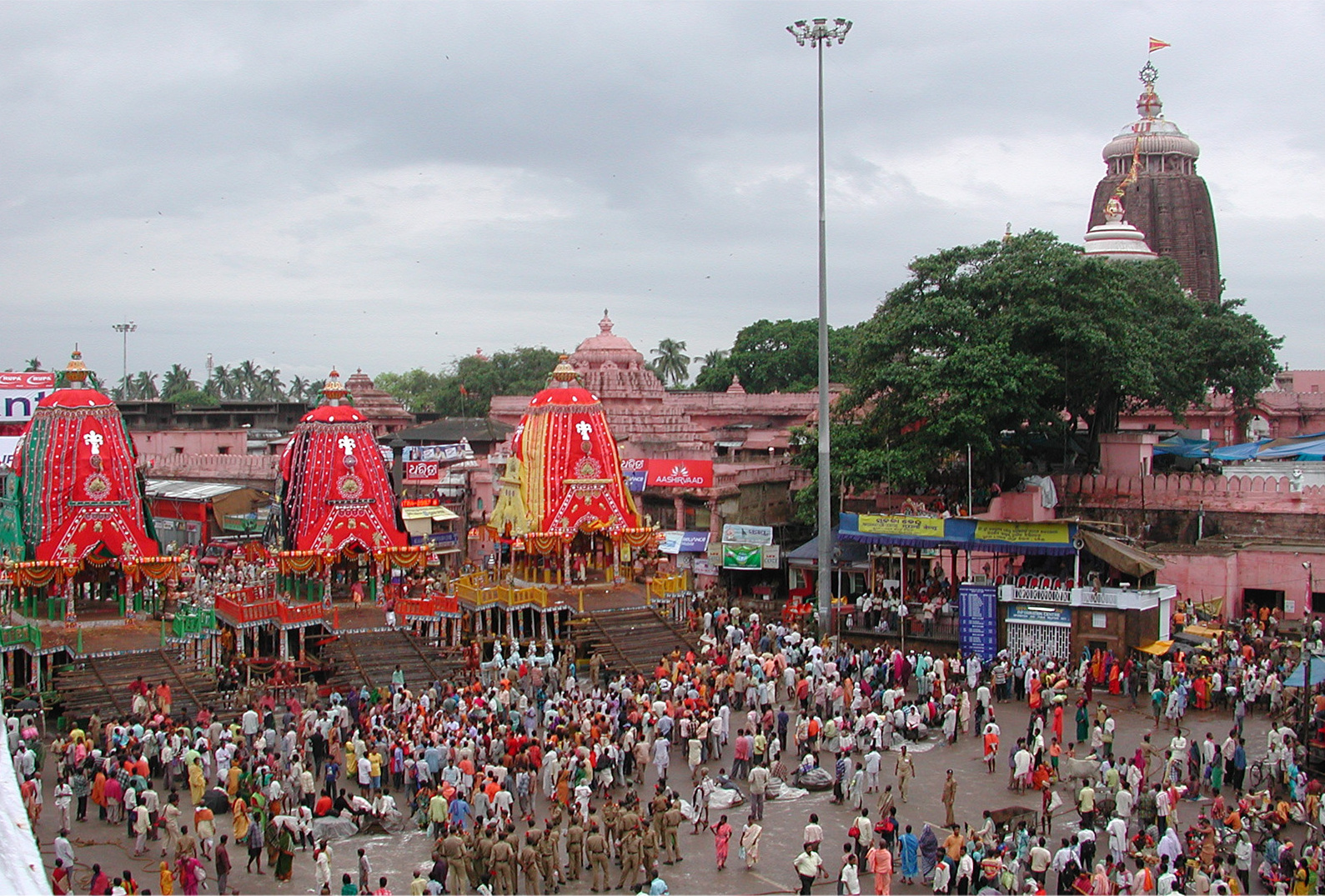
The Rath Yatra in Puri in modern times showing the three chariots of the deities with the Temple in the background

There are elaborate daily worship services. There are many festivals each year attended by millions of people. A large number of traditional festivals are observed by the devotees of Jagannath. Out of those numerous festivals, twelve are important.

1. Snana Yatra
2. Ratha Yatra or Sri Gundicha Yatra
3. Sri Hari Sayan
4. Utthapan Yatra
5. Parswa Paribartan
6. Dakhinayan Yatra
7. Prarbana Yatra
8. Pusyavishek
9. Uttarayan
10. Dola Yatra
11. Damanak Chaturdasi
12. Akshaya Tritiya

== Snana Yatra ==
On the Purnima of the month of Jyestha the Gods are ceremonially bathed and decorated every year on the occasion of Snana Yatra.

== Ratha Yatra ==
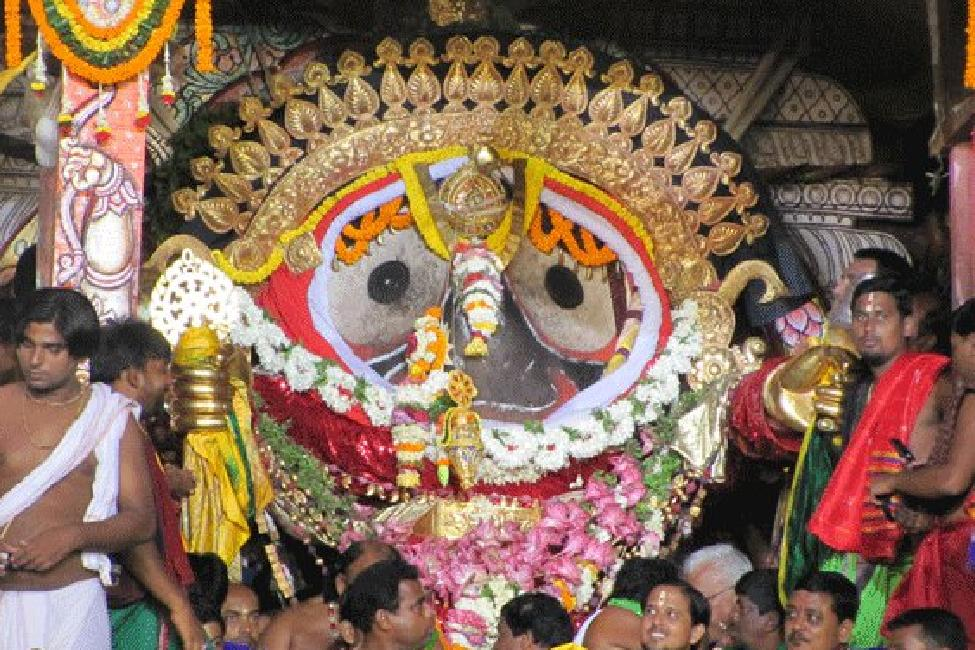
Suna Vesha or Golden Attire of Lord Jagannath

Ratha Yatra is most significant of all festivals of Jagannath. The Jagannath triad are usually worshiped in the sanctum of the temple, but once during the month of Asadha (Rainy Season of Odisha, usually falling in month of June or July), they are brought out onto the Bada Danda (The main high street of Puri) and travel (3 km) to the Shri Gundicha Temple, in huge chariots (Rath), allowing the public to have Darshan (Holy view). This festival is known as Ratha Yatra, meaning the festival (Yatra) of the chariots (Ratha). Ratha-Yatra is also termed as the Shri Gundicha yatra.

This spectacular festival includes a procession of three huge chariots bearing the idols of Jagannath, Balabhadra and Subhadra through the Bada Danda meaning the Grand Avenue of Puri till their final destination the Gundicha Temple.

=== Hera Panchami ===
Hera Panchami is known as a ritual of Maa Mahalakshmi. Celebrated on the fifth day from Rath Yatra i.e. fifth day in bright fortnight of Ashadha.

== Hari Sayan ==
This is the sayana utsav (sleeping ceremony) of the Lord. Sri Hari Sayan festival of Lord Jagannath is observed on the Asadha sukla edadashi (June–July).

== Chandan Yatra ==
In Akshaya Tritiya every year the Chandan Yatra festival marks the commencement of the construction of the Chariots of the Ratha Yatra.

== Panchaka ==
During panchaka many people wait for different Beshas of deities. Different vesha like Dalakia vesha, Adakia vesha, Laksmi Nrusingha Vesha, Trivikrama vesha and finally on the day of Kartik Purnima lord is decorated in Rajarajeswara vesha.

== Nabakalebara ==
One of the most grandiloquent events associated with the Lord Jagannath, Naba Kalabera takes place when one lunar month of Ashadha is followed by another lunar month of Aashadha. This can take place in 8, 12 or even 18 years. Literally meaning the “New Body” (Nava = New, Kalevar = Body). The event involves installation of new images in the temple and burial of the old ones in the temple premises at Koili Vaikuntha. The idols that are currently being worshipped in the temple premises were installed in the year 1996. Presently in the year of 2015 Nabakalebara was held after 19 years.

== Anavasara or Anasara ==
Literally means vacation. Every year, the main idols of Jagannath, Balabhadra, Subhadra & Sudarshan after the holy Snana Yatra on the Jyestha purnima, go to a secret altar named Anavasara Ghar where they remain for the next dark fortnight (krishna paksha). Hence devotees are not allowed to view them. Instead of this devotees go to nearby place Brahmagiri to see their beloved lord in the form of four handed form Alarnath a form of Vishnu. Then people get the first glimpse of lord on the day before Rath Yatra, which is called 'Nabayaubana. It is said that the gods fall in fever after taking a huge bath and they are treated by the special servants named, Daitapatis for 15 days. During this period cooked food is not offered to the deities.

== Niladri Bije ==
Celebrated on Asadha Trayodashi. Niladri Bije is the concluding day of Ratha yatra. On this day deities return to the ratna bedi. Lord Jagannath offers Rasgulla to goddess Mahalakshmi to enter into the temple.

== Gupta Gundicha ==
The annual shodasha dinatmaka or 16 day puja beginning 8 days prior to Mahalaya of Ashwin month for goddess Vimala and ending on Vijayadashami, is of great importance, in which both the utsava murty of lord Madanmohan and Vimala take part.

Celebrated for 16 days from Ashwina Krushna dwitiya to Vijayadashami. As per tradition, the idol of Madhaba, along with the idol of Goddess Durga (known as Durgamadhaba), is taken on a tour of the temple premises. The tour within the temple is observed for the first eight days. For the next eight days, the idols are taken outside the temple on a palanquin to the nearby Narayani temple situated in the Dolamandapa lane. After their worship, they are brought back to the temple.

Many festivals like Dol Yatra in spring and Jhulan Yatra in monsoon are celebrated by temple every year. Pavitrotsava and Damanaka utsava are celebrated as per panchanga or panjika. There are special ceremonies in the month of Kartika and Pausha.

- Pana Sankranti: Also known or Vishuva Sankranti and Mesha Sankranti: Special rituals are performed at the temple.
- Chitalagi Amabasya: Also known as Chitau Amabasya celebrated on Srabana Amavasya (July–August), the gold and precious stone set Chitas those are removed from the deities on the Snana Purnima (Snana Yatra) night are again adorned on them.
- Deba dipabali: Celebrated for three days from Margasira krushna chaturdashi to shukla pratipada, Jagannath as incarnation of Sri Ram offers pinda to king Dasarath. On the second day as Krishna he offers Pinda to his original parents Basudev and Devaki and on the third day he offered Pinda to his foster parents Nanda and Jashoda.
