= Padmapur, Rayagada =

Padmapur
- Village
- Location in Odisha, India Padmapur (India)
- Coordinates: 19°14′34″N 83°49′05″E
- Country: India
- State: Odisha
- District: Rayagada

Government
  - Type: Democratic
- Elevation: 82 m (269 ft)

Population (2011)
  - Total: 6,654

Languages
  - Official: Odia
- Time zone: UTC+5:30 (IST)
- PIN: 765025
- Telephone code: 06857
- Vehicle registration: OD
- Website: odisha.gov.in

Padmapur is a village in the Rayagada district of Odisha, India. It is the most populated village and one of the identified tourist centers of Rayagada district. A hillock adjoins the village to its northern side. A 7th century inscription found here, in the Nilakantheswar Temple (a religious place i.e. the shrine of Lord Manikeswar Shiva), indicates that the Jagamanda hill, located close by, once housed the monastery of the famous Buddhist logician-philosopher Dharmakirti.

== Demography ==
Padmapur is a populated village in Rayagada district situated about 67 km away from the district headquarters. As of 2001 India census, Padmapur village had a population of 6530.The total population of the village as per the 2011 Census of India was 6654 out of which the male population is 3411 and the female population is 3243.

The postal Index Number (PIN) of padmapur is 765025.

== Geography ==
Padmapur is located at 19°14′34″N 83°49′05″E. It has a mixed climate of mountain and coastal plain.

== Transport ==
There is no direct rail or air communication to Padmapur. The nearest airport is in Visakhapatnam (240 km) and the nearest railway station is in Gunupur. One can reach Padmapur via Rayagada by Odisha State Road Transport Corporation buses or private buses.

== Temples ==
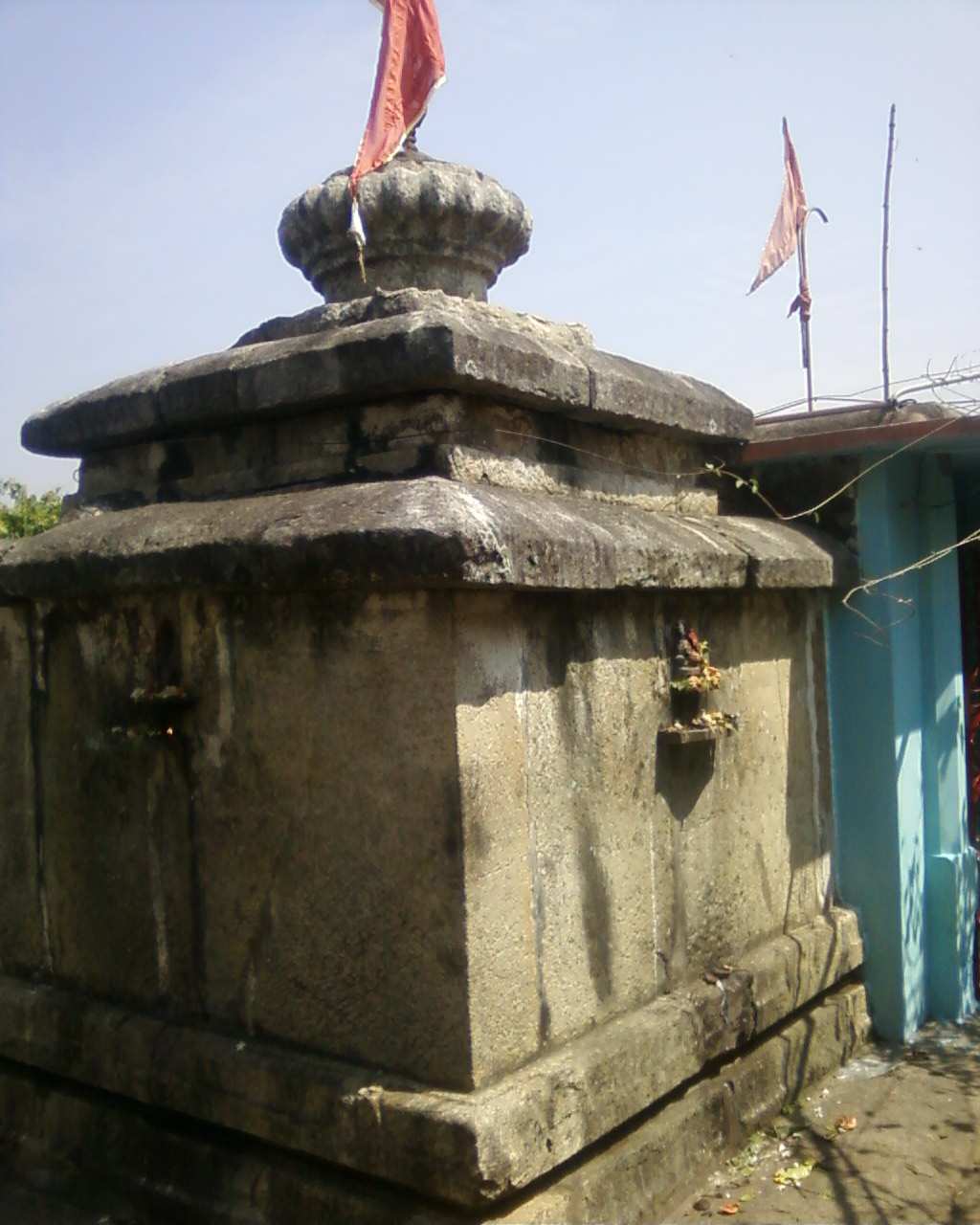
Nilakantheswar temple

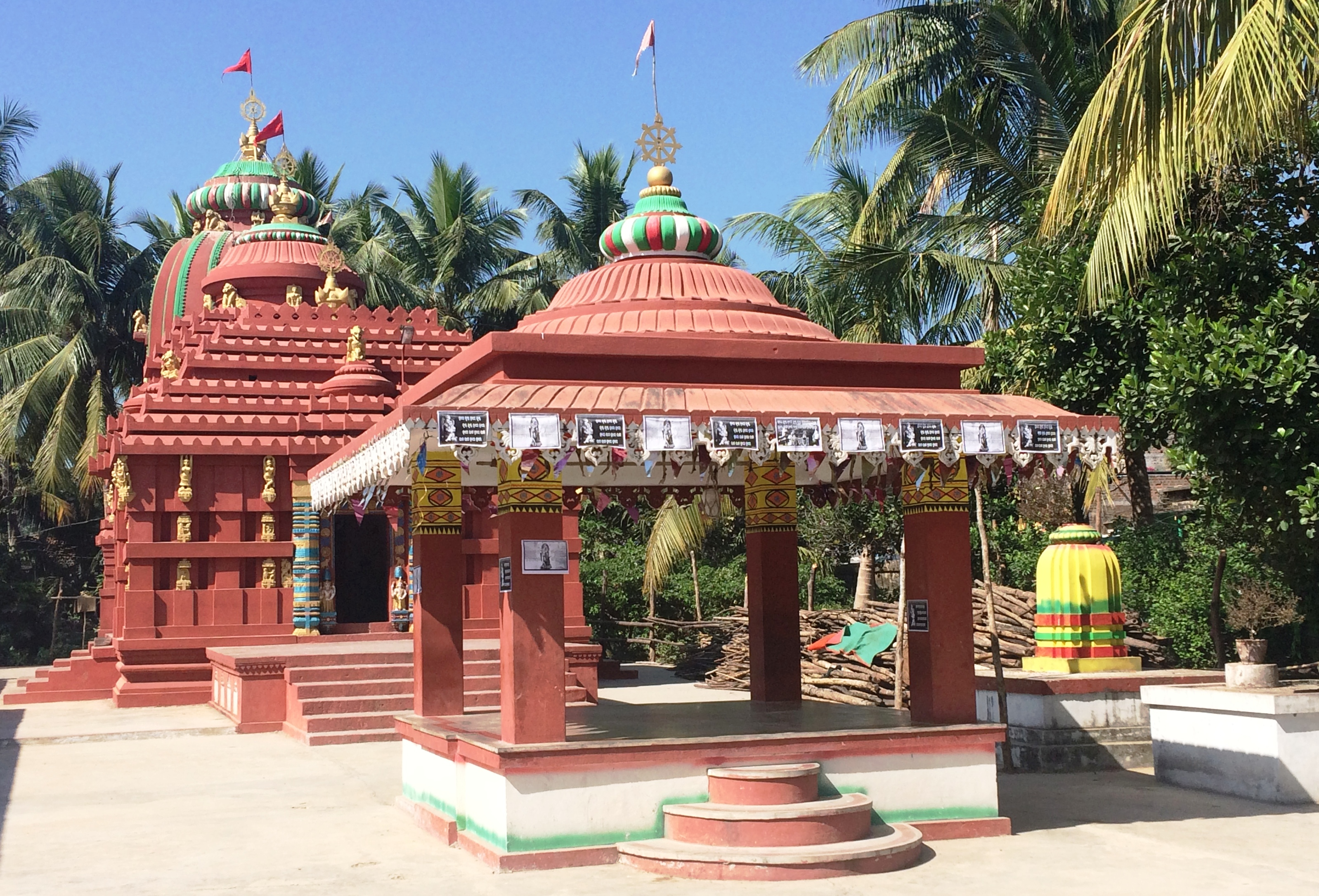
Radhakrushna Temple, Padmapur

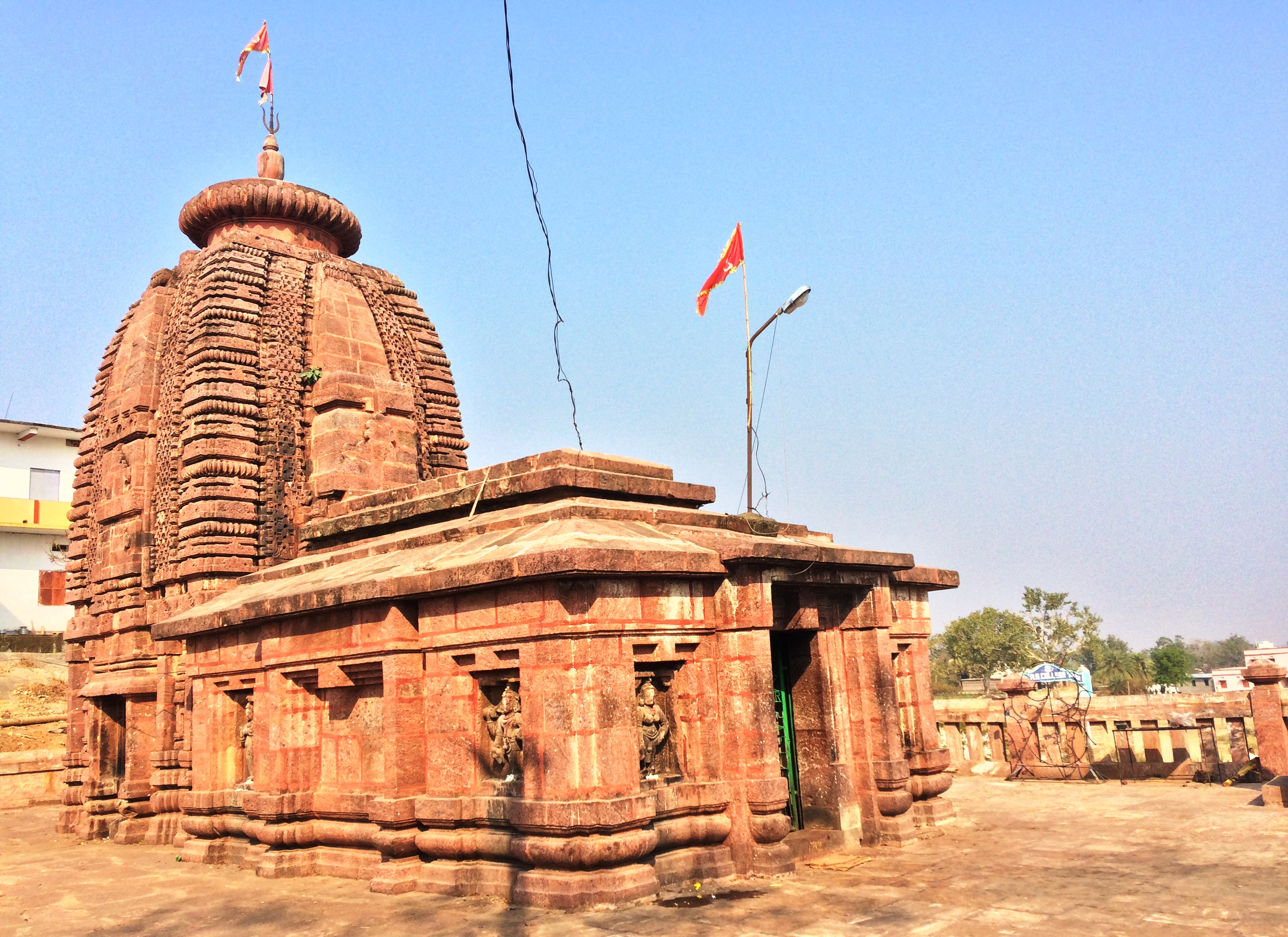
situated on the Jagamunda Hills of Padmapur

A number of old and new temples in and around Padmapur, as detailed below, attract the nearby mass during festive seasons.

- The seventh century-old Nilakantheswar temple at Padmapur (a shrine to Shiva) on the top of the hillock adjoining the village. This temple is also believed to be the Mallikeshwara temple
- The temple of Mallikeswar at the foot of the hillock, which is built of red rocks
- The temple of Dhabaleswar beside the temple of Mallikeswar
- Baba Akhandala mani divine presence also adds charm of spiritual enhancement.
- Another temple of Pudukeswar close to these temples at the foot of the hillock,
- The Radhakrushna temple in New Street
- The Giridhari temple in the Badasahi
- The Gopinatha temple or Dasima Matha
- The Trinath temple beside the road leading to Gunupur
- The Gramadevati temple at the heart of the village
- The Gayatri temple on the hillock area
- The temple of Hanumana and the temple of Sai Baba on the hillock
- Another small temple of Trinath at Jhumuruguda beside the main road

== Education ==
Padmapur has a number of educational institutions. Some of them are:

- The Govt. Bijayananda High School
- The Govt. Boys' Upper Primary School near Markama street
- The Primary school at Medical Colony in the village
- The Primary School at Hatapada in the village
- The Girls' High School
- The R.G.(Junior) College
- Triveni +2 Science College
- The Ideal Public School
- The Aryan English Medium School at Padmapur
- The Gajanana Vidya Niketana (Odia medium)
- The Saraswati Sishu Mandir (Odia medium)

== Notable people ==
- Nagbhushan Patnaik, a Communist leader, was born at Padmapur in 1934
- Gopal Krushna Padhy, Civil Servant of 1988 batch, who cleared UPSC Civil Services in 1987 and was allotted the Indian Post & Telecommunication Accounts and Finance Service. One of the first civil servants of the Rayagada District(Erstwhile undivided Koraput District).
