= Govt. Boys' High School, Gunupur =

Govt.Boys' High School, Gunupur
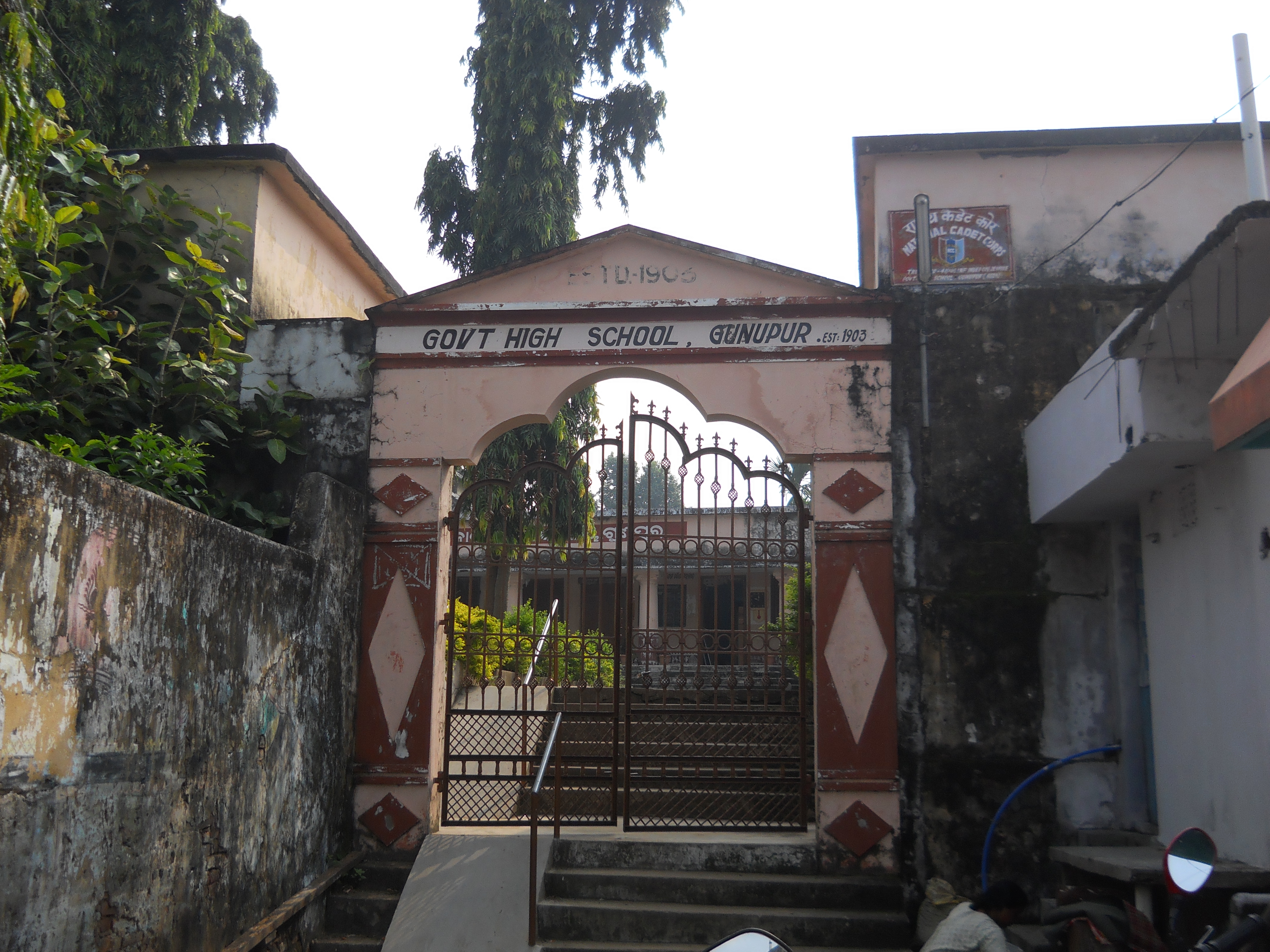

Location
- Gunupur, Odisha, India
- Coordinates: 19.082469°N 83.807721°E

Information
- Established: 1903
- Headmaster: Mr.Chandra Sekhar Prodhan
- Grades: Class 6th to 10th
- Enrollment: 650 to 700
- Website: "www.ghsgunupur.com"

Govt. Boys' High School, Gunupur, is located beside the banks of Vamsadhara River at Gunupur of Rayagada district in the Indian state of Odisha. The original structure of the public educational building is totally made of stone & the institution stands on an elevated plot of the town. It is one of the oldest High Schools of the district. It is an oriya medium school affiliated to the Board of Secondary Education, Odisha under State Government of Odisha. The school celebrates its Centenary celebration in April 2015.

== History ==
The 120-year-old high school was established in the year 1903. During pre-independence period, the district Board at koraput (with the collector and Agent as its president) upgraded the middle school at Gunupur to a High School in 1929. The school was a pioneer in the development of education in the undivided koraput district. It has given rise to many well known personalities such as former justice of High Court of Odisha M. Papanna (worked as judge from 29.09.2000 to 03.03.2004), Nagbhushan Patnaik, Sri Arjuna Gamang, Pandit Raghunath Panigrahi, Nanaji Varanasi. The school maintains an ECO Club

== See also ==
- Board of Secondary Education, Odisha
- List of schools in India
