= Beshas of Jagannath =

Religious adornments

In Odia and Sanskrit, Besha means dress or adornment. Lord Jagannath and his siblings are adorned with different beshas throughout the year. Out of all beshas of lord Jagannath and his siblings, the Suna Besha, are held several times during a year. The all beshas of lord Jagannath and his siblings are listed below :

== List of Besha with Tithi ==
Name	Month	Tithi (days)	Notes
Gajanana/Hati Besha	Jeshtha	Purnima	
Naba Jaubana Besha	Ashadha	Amabasya	
Suna Besha	Ashadha	Shukla Ekadashi	
Bana Bhoji Besha	Bhaadra	Krushna Dashami	
Kaliya Dalana Besha	Bhaadra	Krushna Ekadashi	
Pralambasura Baddha Besha	Bhaadra	Krushna Dwadashi	
Krushna Balaram Besha	Bhaadra	Krushna Trayodashi	
Bali Vamana Besha	Bhaadra	Shukla Dwadashi	
Suna/Raja Besha	Ashvin	Shukla Dashami(Vijaya Dashami or Dashahara)	
Radha Damodar Besha	Ashvin & Kartika	Ashvin Shukla Ekadashi to Kartika Shukla Dashami	
Harihara Besha	Kartika	All Mondays between Kartika Amabasya(Deepavali) to Kartika Shukla Dashami	
Thiakia/Laxminarayan Besha	Kartika	Shukla Ekadashi	
Bankachuda Besha	Kartika	Shukla Dwadashi	
Dalikia/Tribikram Besha	Kartika	Shukla Trayodashi	
Adakia/Laxminrusingha Besha	Kartika	Shukla Chaturdashi	
Nagarjuna Besha	Kartika	Shukla Mala tithi between Kartika Shukla Dwadashi to Kartika Shukla Chaturdashi	
Suna/Raja Rajeswar Besha	Kartika	Purnima	
Shraddha Besha	Margashira	Krushna Chaturdashi, Amabasya & Shukla Pratipada	
Ghodalagi Besha	Margashira, Pausha & Magha	Margashira Shukla Shashthi(Odhana Shashthi) to Magha Shukla Panchami(Basanta Panchami)	
Jamalagi Besha	Magha & Phalguna	Magha Shukla Panchami(Basanta Panchami) to Phalguna Shukla Dashami(Phagu Dashami)	
Nabanka Besha	Makar	One day before the Makar Sankranti	
Makara Chaurashi Besha	Makar	Makar Sankranti	
Suna Besha/Pushyabhisheka Besha/Raja Besha	Pausha	Purnima	
Padma Besha	Magha	Wednesday or Saturday between Magha Amabasya to Magha Shukla Panchami(Basanta Panchami)	
Gaja Uddharana Besha	Magha	Purnima	
Chacheri Besha	Phalguna	Phalguna Shukla Dashami(Phagu Dashami) to Phalguna Shukla Chaturdashi	
Suna Besha/Raja Besha	Phalguna	Purnima	
Raghunath Besha	Vaishakha	It had been held last time on April 27, 1905, Thursday	
Chandana Lagi Besha	Vaishakha & Jeshtha	Vaishakha Shukla Trutiya(Akshaya Tritiya) to Jeshtha Shukla Chaturdashi	

== Gallery ==
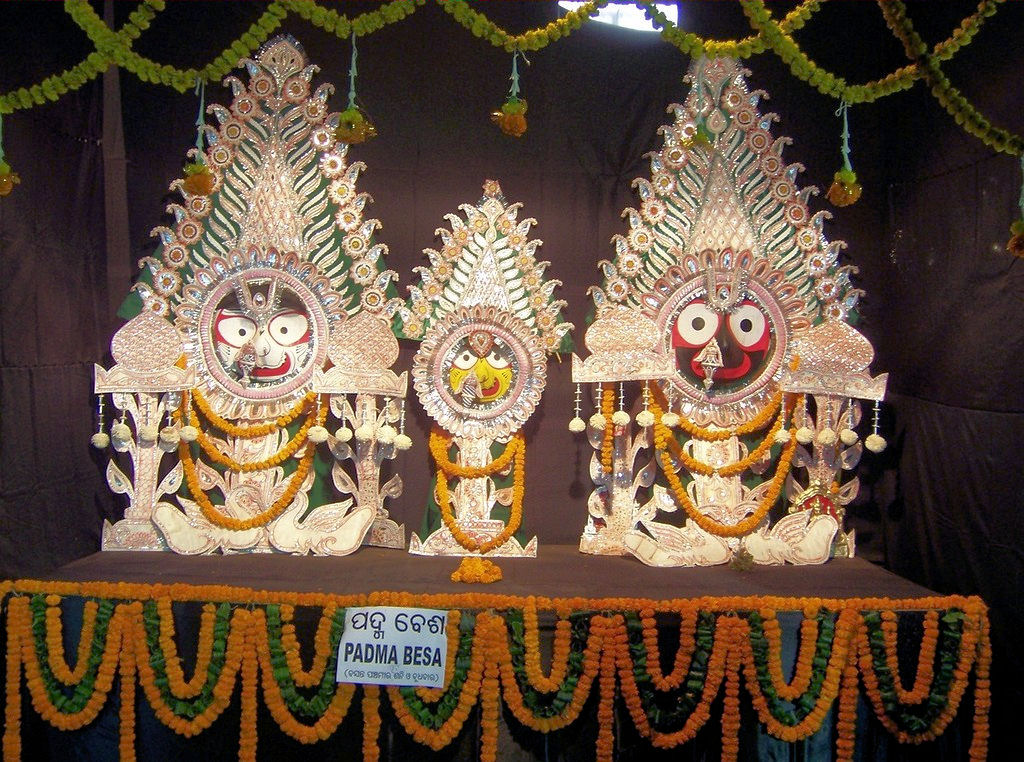
Padma Besha

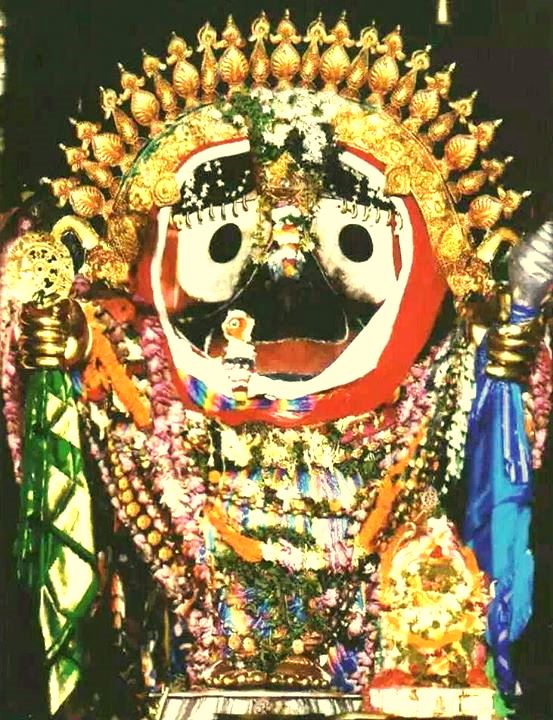
Suna Besha
