= Gadasahi =

- Village
- Location in Odisha
- Coordinates: 19.965791°N 85.625172°E
- State: Odisha, (India)
- District: Puri district
- Nagar panchayat: Sakhigopal

Languages
- Time zone: UTC+5:30 (IST)
- Postal code: 752017

Gadasahi is a village near New Jagannath Sadak (newly NH16) in India, in Satyabad, Puri district.

The village is surrounded by paddy fields and ponds. According to local Hindu tradition, the goddess of the village is Maa Harachandi. There are nine temples in the village.

In the village Gadasahi there are two schools. One is primary and other is Secondary. The name of primary school is Biswambhar Nodal UP school and other is Jankia Gadasahi Bidyaniketan.

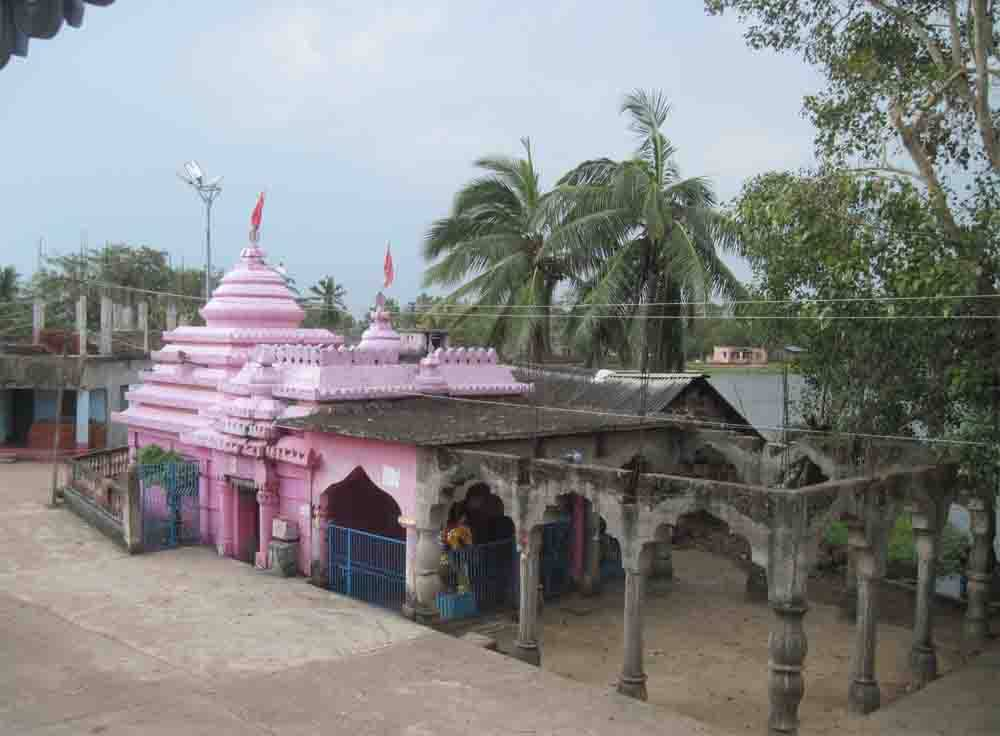

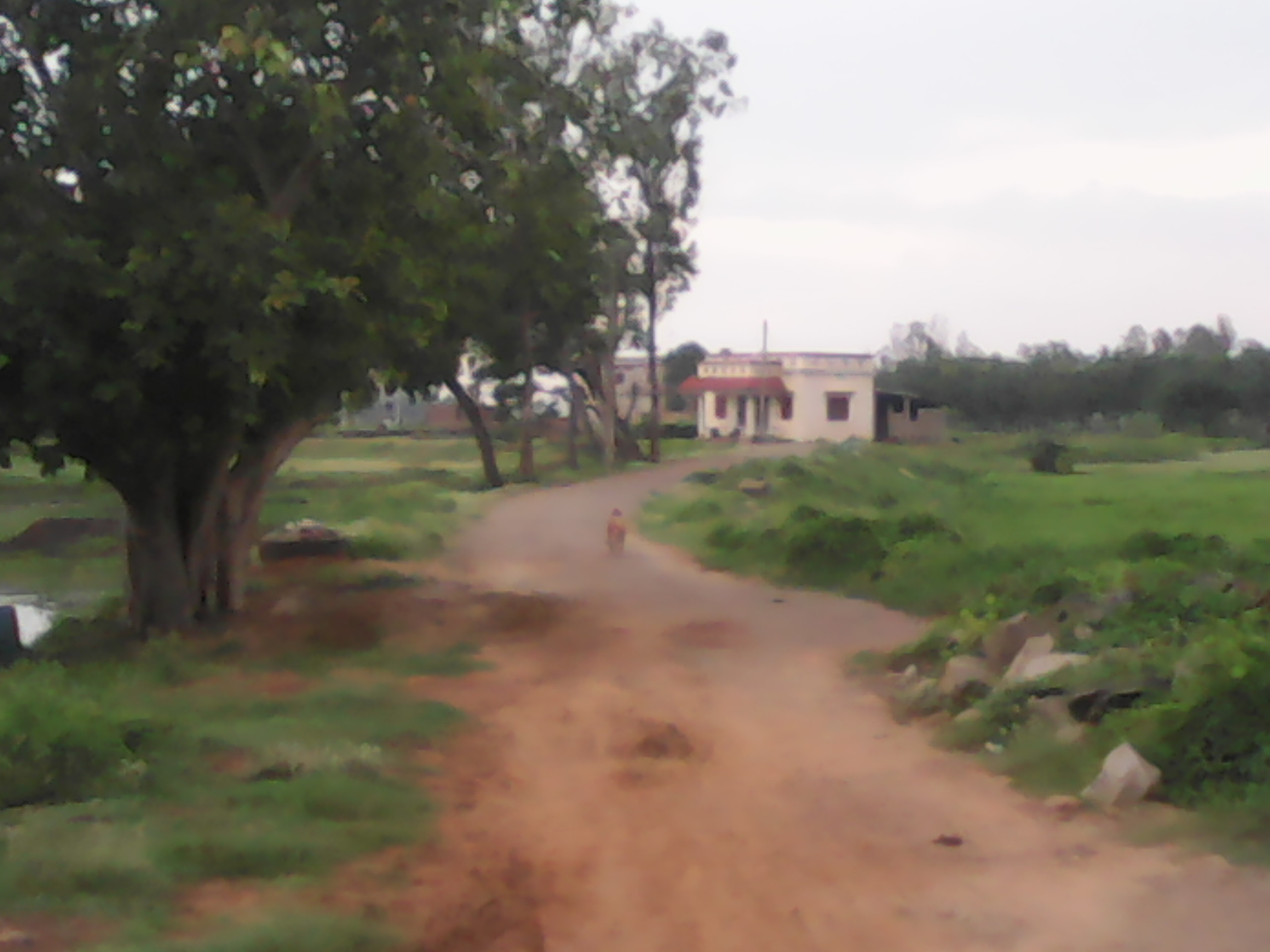

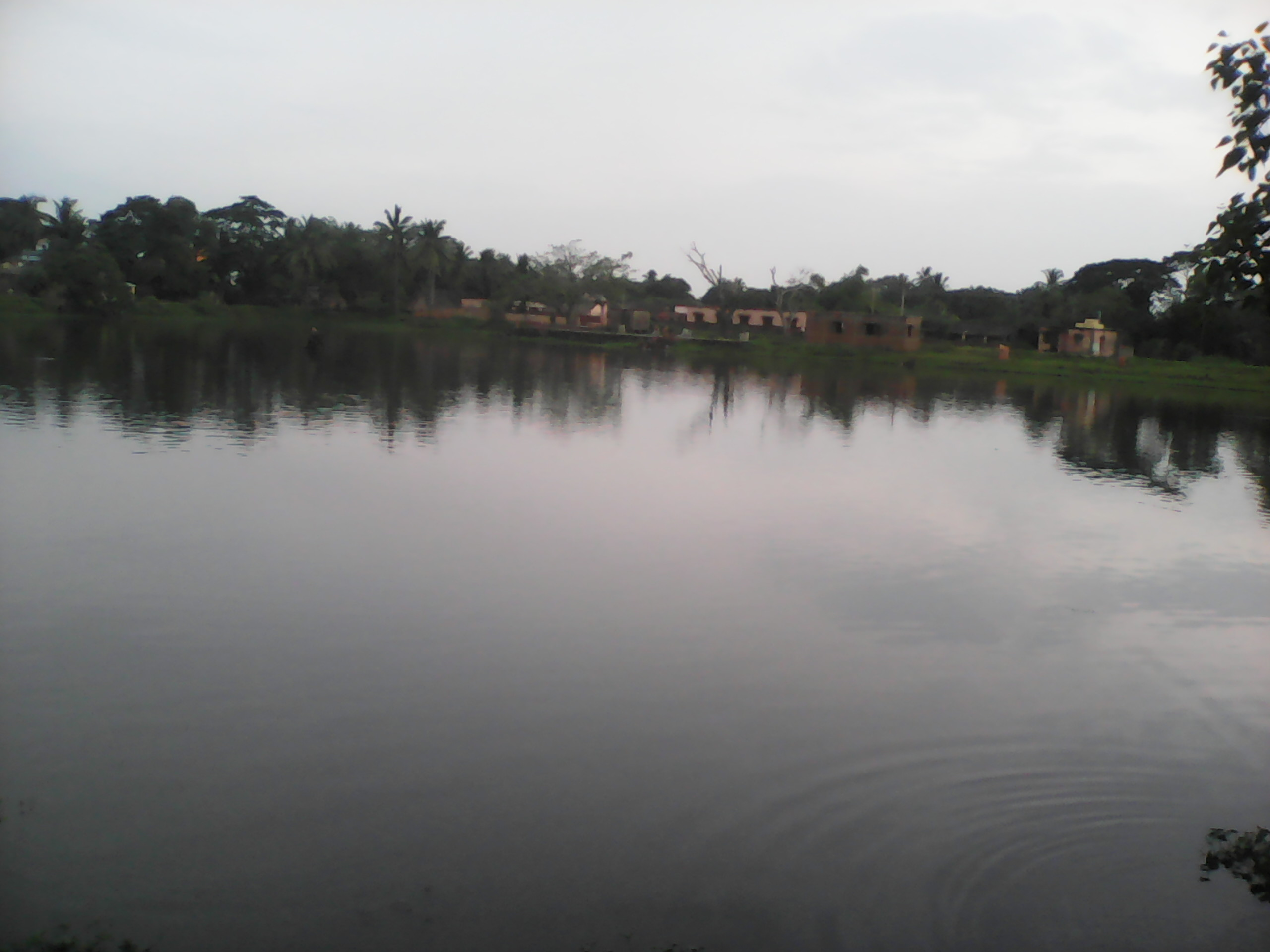
pond

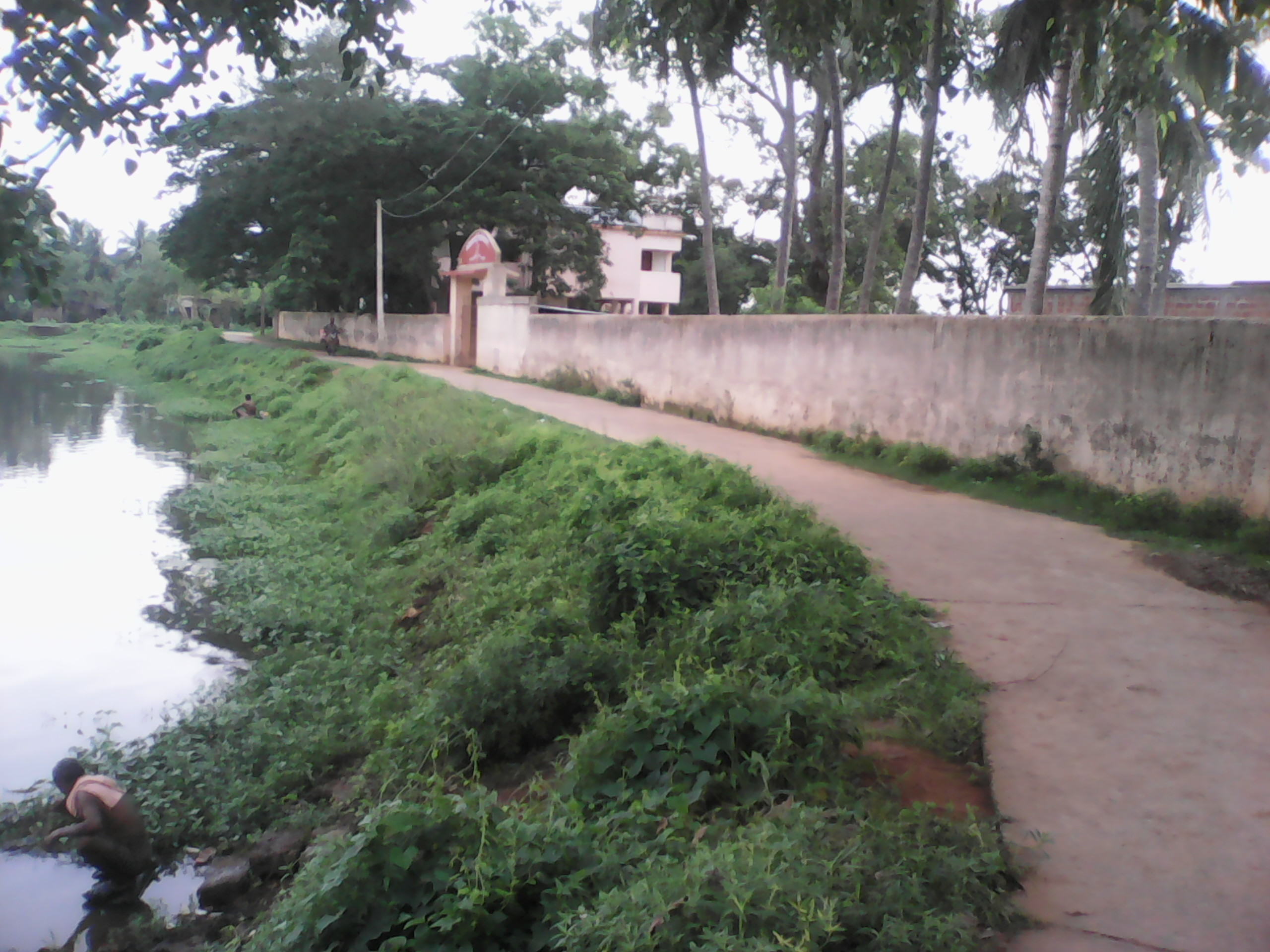

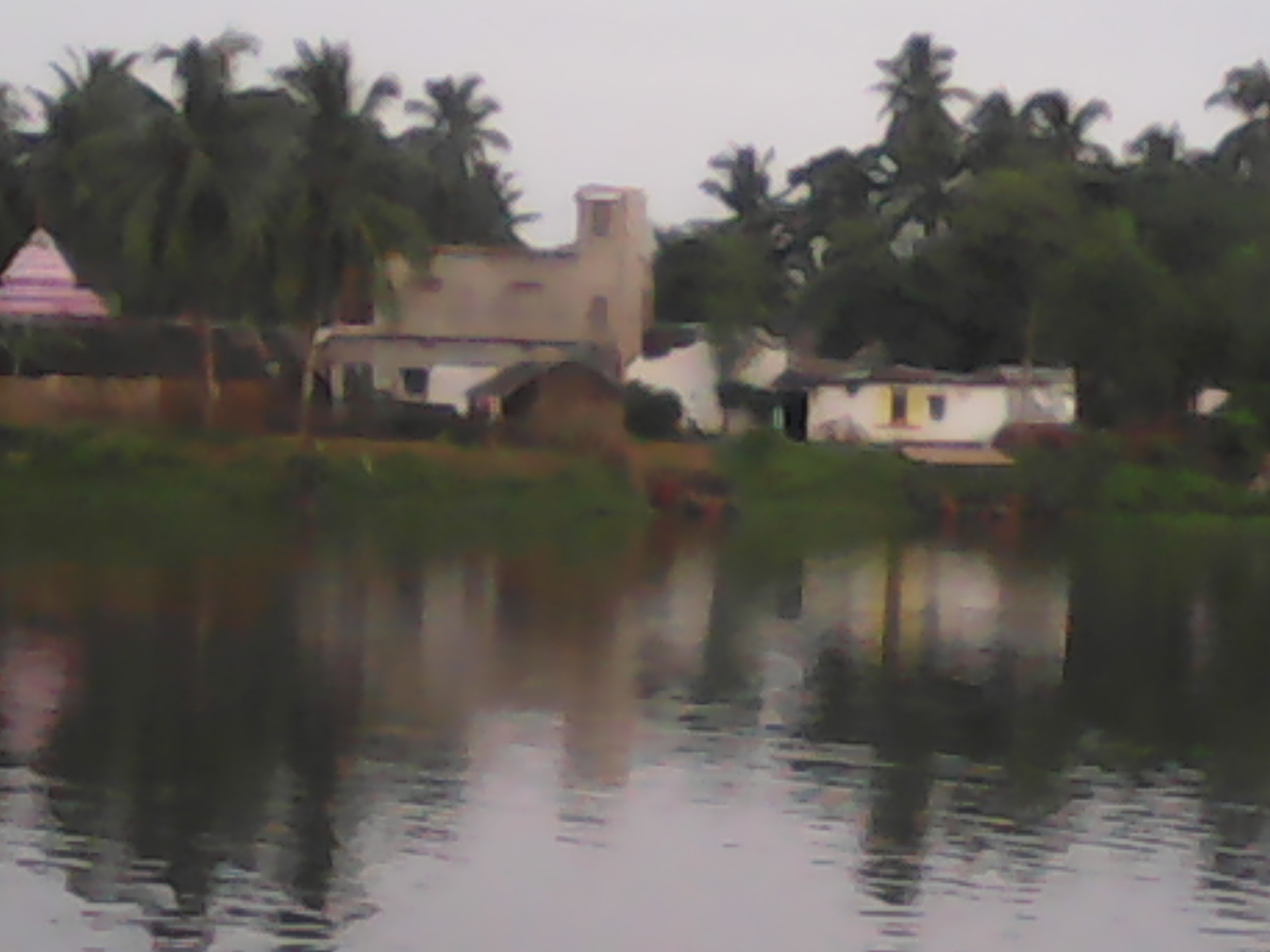
