= D. B. M. Patnaik =

- Born: Donkada Bhuvan Mohan Patnaik; 31 October 1925; Bhagimpeta, Srikakulam district, Andhra Pradesh
- Died: 11 February 2009 (aged 83)
- Occupation: lawyer

Donkada Bhuvan Mohan Patnaik (31 October 1925 – 11 February 2009), also known as D. B. M. Patnaik or simply DBM, was an Indian lawyer, politician and communist leader. He was from Bhagimpeta in Srikakulam district.

Patnaik practiced law at the Gunupur district court where he met Nagbhushan Patnaik; both of them defended peasants in court cases. In 1967, the two of them became active in the Naxalite movement that lead to the formation of the Communist Party of India (Marxist-Leninist).

Patnaik started his political career with the Communist Party of India and subsequently joined the CPI (M). Along with Nagbhushan Patnaik, he joined the revolutionary communists in the Srikakulam Girijan Naxalbari movement. He was an active leader of the movement and subsequently joined the CPI (ML) which was formed after the various Naxalite movements. He later joined the UCCRI (ML). He was active in various trade union movements and was also instrumental in the struggles of the people belonging to the lower economic strata of coastal Andhra Pradesh and Orissa.

D. B. M. Patnaik died on 12 February 2009 at the age of 84, after developing complications from surgery.
