= Nagbhushan Patnaik =

Indian politician (1934 – 1998)

- Born: 27 November 1934; Padmapur, Madras Presidency, British India
- Died: 9 October 1998 (aged 63); Chennai, India
- Political party: CPIML Liberation
- Movement: Naxalism

Nagbhushan Patnaik (27 November 1934 – 9 October 1998) was a communist revolutionary from Odisha. Born in a middle-class family to Ramamurty Patnaik and Rajalaxmi Patnaik in Padmapur on 27 November 1934, Nagbhushan participated in the Naxalbari movement and remained in its front ranks to determine the future course of communist revolutionaries. He was one of the few founders of CPI(M-L) who remained active until the end of their lives.

== Childhood ==
Nagbhushan Patnaik spent his early years in Padmapur, Rayagada, where he completed his primary education. His family later relocated to Gunupur, where he continued his studies at the Govt. Boys' High School.

According to an account he shared in an interview, an incident during his childhood led to his naming. complaint was lodged with his father regarding Nagbhushan's altercation with another boy. His father attempted to discipline him, prompting Nagbhushan to flee and seek refuge in a temple. His father pursued him, locking the temple door to prevent his escape. Cornered, Nagbhushan picked up a brick fragment, threatening to retaliate if his father caught him. His father, though angered, refrained from punishing him. Following this event, he named him "Nagbhushan," meaning "the Lord wearing a snake."

== Life ==
At the age of 15, Patnaik joined the A.I.S.F. during his graduation at S.K.C.G. College of Paralakhemundi. Then he joined the Banaras Hindu University (BHU) for his post graduation course. He was greatly influenced by the socialistic atmosphere at BHU. As a poet, Najrul Islam was his inspiration. He spoke many languages like Oriya, Telugu, Bengali, but most of his writings are in English. Nagbhushan's Poems of Prisons was released in Bhubaneswar on 26 August 2012. Nagbhushan was a practicing lawyer at Gunupur. He met DBM Patnaik at Gunupur where both of them defended poor peasant cases.

=== Campaigning Naxalism ===
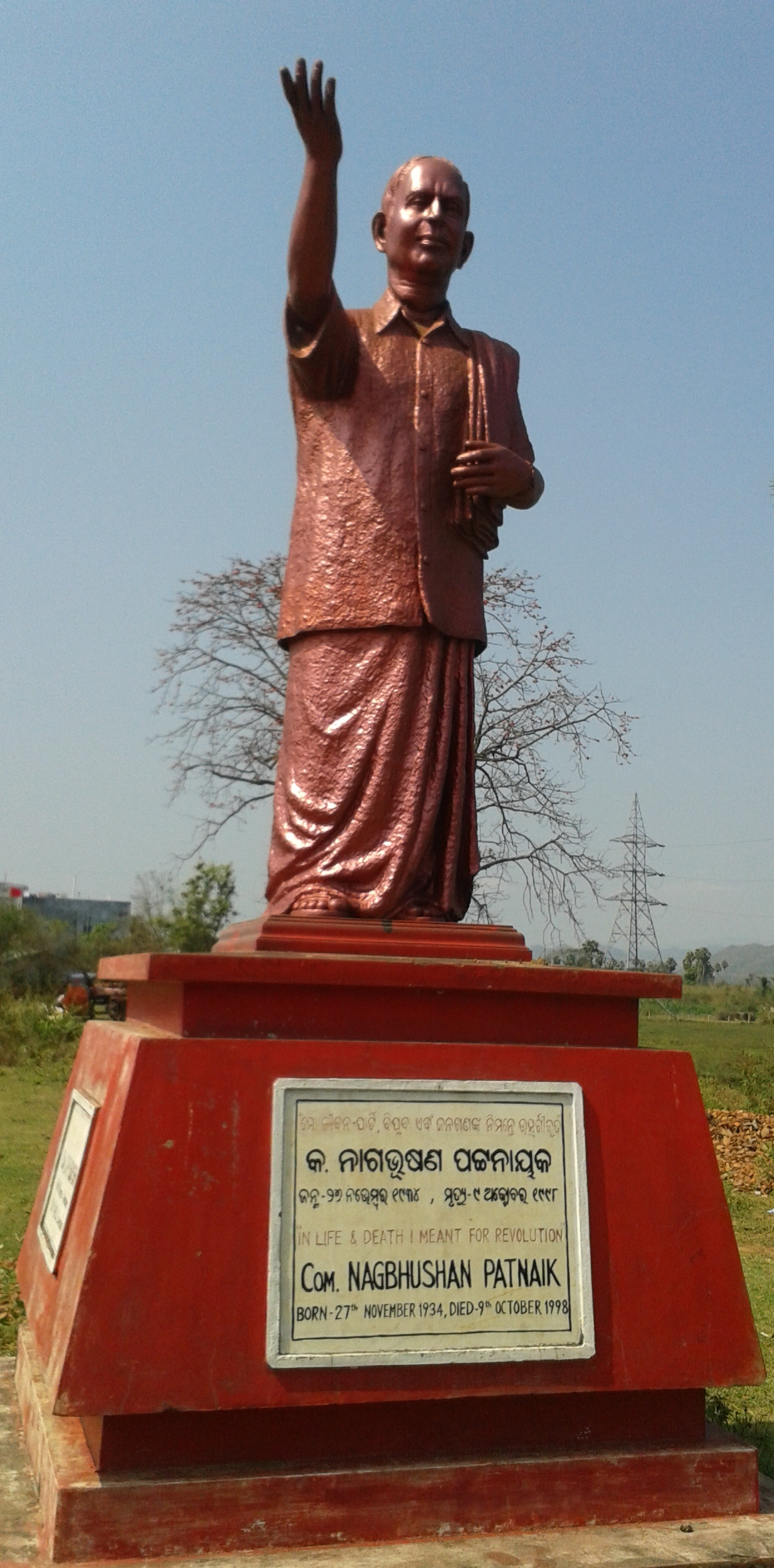
Statue of Patnaik at By-pass chowk -Gunupur

When the Communist Party was divided in 1964, Patnaik and his Comrades joined CPIM. In the beginning of the 60th decade, he made several efforts to unite the local Adivasis of Malkangiri and the workers of the Balimela area and geared up the movement in his ways. He was arrested with other leaders in 1966 & was kept at Tihar Jail. In the jail he met the Telangana leader Sundarayya. He discussed with him his action plan of which Sundarayya became a great supporter.

When Ramamurthy, who was in charge of the trade union movement, directed Patnaik to hinder the movement and to keep it within the democratic process, he could not accept the policy. He then initiated his armed peasants movement and workers movement in his own way. With the change in the policies of CPIM, he drifted away from the party policies. The revolutionary communist party CPIML was founded on 22 April 1969 and Nagbhushan was one of the founding leaders.

In 1966, he underwent a stomach operation which made him weak physically. In January 1969, he along with DBM Patnaik tried to mobilize the peasants in the villages in Gunupur area to fight for their right, but Odisha police found the information and swooped down upon Naxal hideouts. However, Nagbhushan managed to escape arrest until 15 July 1969, when he was arrested along with 10 comrades. On 8 October 1969, he managed to escape from Vishakhapatnam Central jail with 10 others only to taste freedom for a short period. He was again arrested and put behind bars and was subjected to inhumane torture. He was sentenced to death by the Sessions Court of Vishakhapatnam in the Parvatipuram conspiracy case (in which Nagbhushan Patnaik was one of the principal accused persons) in December 1970. The next year, the sentence was confirmed by Andhra Pradesh High Court. His extensive court defence--"Conspiracy?...No. Revolution?...Yes." has been published as a book and is a classic text in the radical Indian leftist literature. Nagbhushan refused to appeal for clemency.

Patnaik languished in jail even after Janata Dal came to power. After the emergency ended, the civil liberties groups, all his admirers as well as intellectuals and political veterans like Dr. Harekrushna Mahatab, Jayaprakash Narayan, and Sarvodays leader Malati Choudhury raised their voices and called for the release of Nagbhushan Patnaik. He never moved a mercy petition, rather wrote a letter to the jail superintendent asking him to comply with the orders and also to donate his body parts to the needy. At last, their efforts compelled the government to commute the death sentence to a life sentence. It was only after a long and arduous legal battle that he was released in the middle of 1981 when he was almost on his deathbed. On release, the great leader moved to his residence at Gunupur. He was instrumental in the founding of Indian People's Front.

== Death ==
After his release on parole, Patnaik spent his days mostly at Gunupur. He remained mostly busy with his profession. There he, with D. B. M. Patnaik continued his profession as lawyer. Patnaik was instrumental in the historic judgment passed by the Supreme Court, declaring section 309 of the Indian Penal Code unconstitutional. Patnaik's strong moral stand gave him popularity across party lines. His lifelong mission to unify various revolutionary groups still remains a dream to be fulfilled. Nowadays some of the Naxal groups even forgot to adhere to true naxalism and to respect the great leader. On 9 October 1998, Patnaik died in a private hospital at Chennai due to renal failure.
