= New Jagannath Sadak =

New Jagannath Road

Route information
- Length: 96 km (60 mi)
- Existed: 1996–present

Major junctions
- From: Chandanpur of Puri
- To: Sarankula of Nayagarh

New Jagannath Road (also known as Nua Jagannath Sadak/Jagannath Sadak ) is the road to Jagannath Dham, Puri.

Total length: 96 km, covering three major districts of Odisha - Puri, Khurdha, and Nayagarh.

It passes through six assembly segments. Road is from Biranarsinghpur of Puri to Sarankula of Nayagarh.

Road inaugurated: 1996 by Janaki Ballabh Patnaik, former CM, Odisha.

Road work started: 1987

Road completed: 1996 (before Nabakalebara).

Road connecting NH-203 with NH-5, also connects NH-203(A) with NH-224.

It connects Puri with Western Odisha and Southern Odisha; also connecting it with western India and southern India. Most of the road is made from concrete because the road passes through the maximum flood areas. On 9 July 2015 Union minister of Road Transport and National Highway Shree Nitin Gadkari declared New Jagannath Sadak as a National Highway.

The road plays a role in tourism and economic transportation of Odisha.

New Jagannath Road is one of those roads in Odisha which passes through paddy fields, rivers, hills, forests, villages, temples, big markets, and ponds.

New Jagannath Road connects Puri with nearer tourist places like Barkul, Nirmalajhara, Gopalpur, Tara Tarini Temple, Banapur, Odagaon, Sarankul, Maninag Temple. It also connects Puri with Brahmapur, Nayagarh, Balangir, Phulbani, Kalahandi, Sonepur, Boudh and Sambalpur. New Jagannath Sadak passes through Sarankul, Raj-Ranpur, Rameswar, Nirakarpur, Jankia-Gadasahi, Bijipur and Chandanpur town.

Tourists and tourist buses from Maharashtra, Chhattisgarh, Andhra Pradesh, Tamil Nadu and Karnataka are going to Puri by New Jagannath Road. New Jagannath Road is being developed into a two-lane carriage way for Nabakalebara.

In June 2016, the Ministry of Road Transport and Highway approved the NH declaration of New Jagannath Road in principle.

Some parts of this road are MDR (Major District Road) and other parts are ODR (Other District Road).

A new bypass is developed on New Jagannath Road to bypass Biranarsinghpur village of Puri District for the smooth flow of vehicles.

== See also ==
- National Highway 203 (India)
- National Highway 203A (India)
- National Highway 224 (India)
