= National Highway 203A (India, old numbering) =

Old numbering of road in India

National Highway 203A

Route information
- Length: 49 km (30 mi)

Major junctions
- From: Puri
- To: Satpada

Location
- Country: India
- States: Odisha : 49 km

Highway system
- Roads in India; Expressways; National; State; Asian

National Highway 203A is a part of National Highway 203 and connects Puri and Satpada in Odisha, India. It covers a distance of 49 km. It passes through Brahmagiri. New Jagannath Sadak connects NH 203 (A) with NH 5 AND NH 224 .

== See also ==
- National Highways Development Project
- New Jagannath Sadak
