= Nilakantheswar Temple =

Nilakantheswar temple
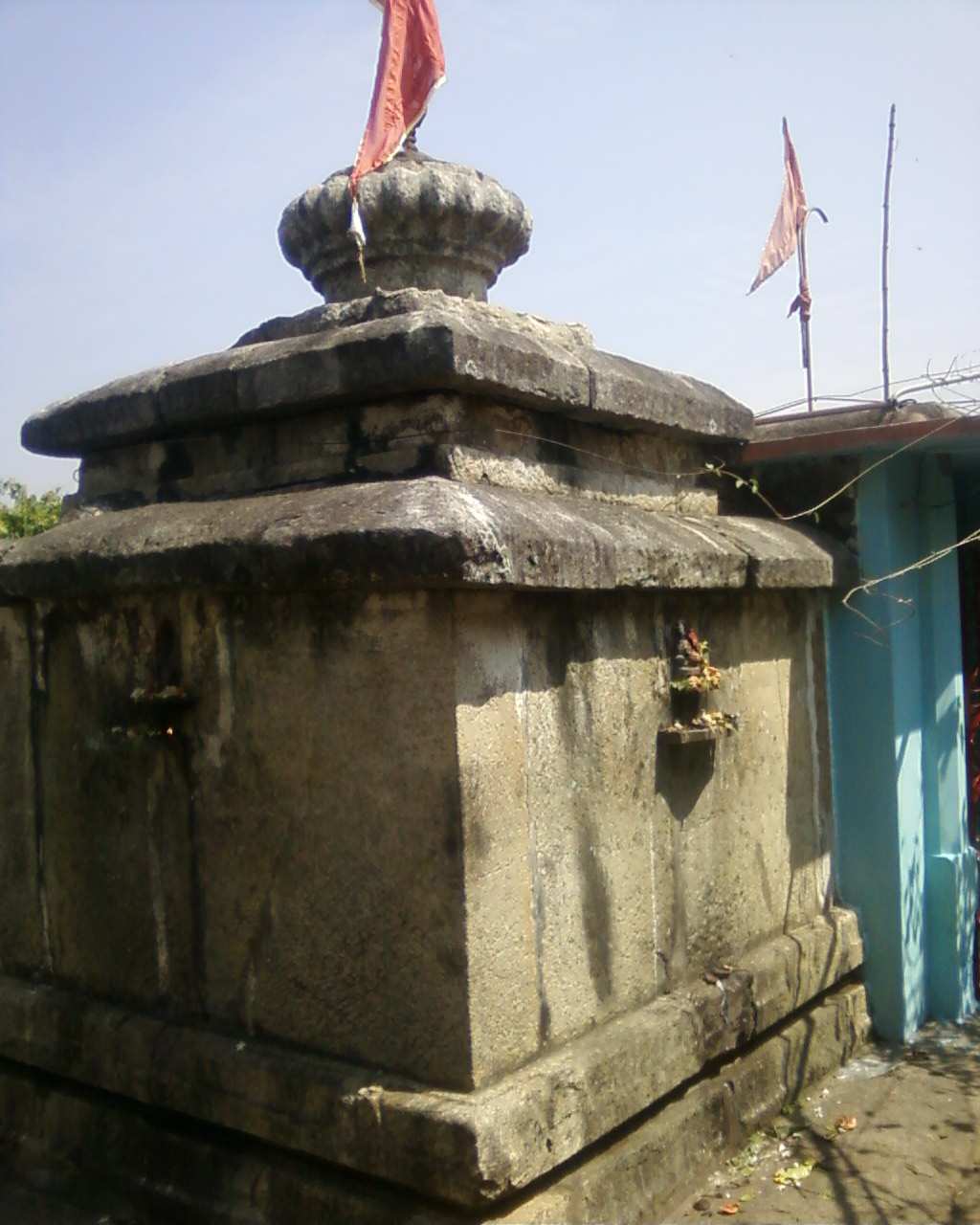

- Location in Odisha

Religion
- Affiliation: Hinduism
- Deity: Lord Shiva

Location
- Location: Padmapur
- State: Odisha
- Country: India
- Interactive map of Nilakantheswar temple
- Coordinates: 19°14′34″N 83°49′05″E

Architecture
- Completed: 07th century A.D.
- Inscriptions: Bramhi

Nilakantheswar Temple at Padmapur, standing on the Jagamanda hills makes the village well known for the Buddhist temple. The temple is built on only seven rocks. There are also three other shiva temples, i.e. Pudukeswar, Dhabaleswar, and Mallikeswar, on the hillock. This 7th-century-old buddhist temple makes Padmapur a tourist center of Rayagada district. The temple is very often referred as shrine of Manikeswar Siva. Recently a small cemented front hall has been added to the original structure.

== History ==
The temple dates back to the 7th century. Padma Shri Dr. Satyanarayana Rajguru, an eminent historian and epigraphist, relying on a buddhist inscription found on one of the rocks of the temple, identifies that the temple once housed the buddhist logician-philosopher, Dharmakirti. It is the only Buddhist monastery in Rayagada district of the Indian state of Odisha. The festival of Maha Sivaratri is celebrated here. Visitors and devotees visit this place, the special day being Tuesday.
