= Alarnatha Mandira =

Hindu temple of Vishnu in Brahmagiri, Indua

Coordinates: 19.794880°N 85.650201°E

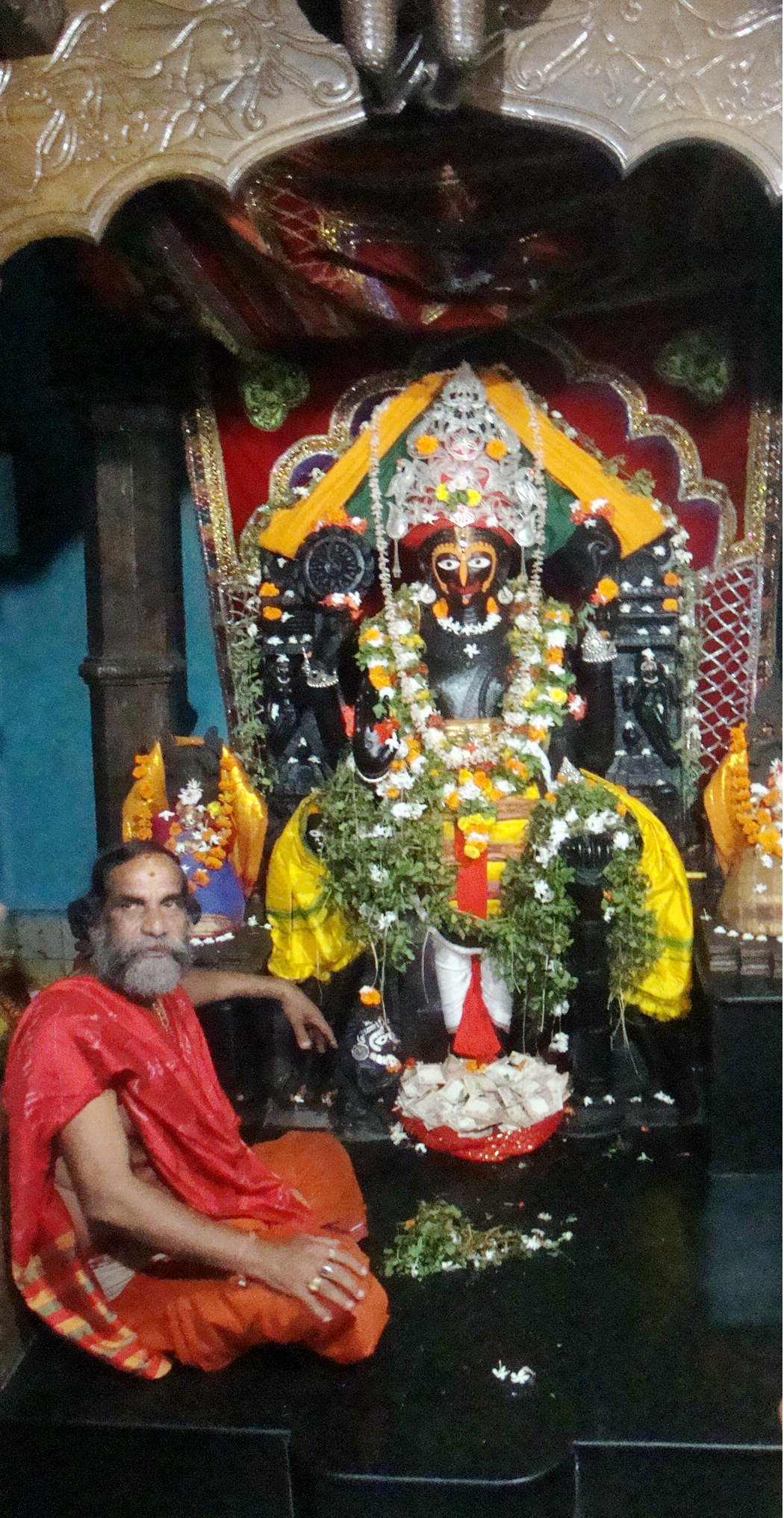
Alarnatha

Alarnatha Mandira or Alvarnaatha Mandira (Sanskrit: अल्वार् नाथ), (Odia: ଅଲାରନାଥ) is a Hindu temple dedicated to Vishnu and located in Brahmagiri, Odisha, near Puri. The temple also houses a shrine for his consort Mahalakshmi. During the krishnapaksha of Ashadha, the temple draws large crowds following the Snana Yatra, as devotees are not allowed to view the central icon of Jagannath (a form of Vishnu) in the Puri temple. During this period, popularly known as Anasara or 'Anavasara' (literally meaning no opportunity to see the Lord), devotees believe that Lord Jagannath manifests as Alarnath Dev at the Alarnath Mandira in Brahmagiri, about 23 km from Puri. Instead of having darshan in the Puri temple, pilgrims visit this shrine. It is considered one among the 108 Abhimana Kshethram of Vaishnavate tradition.

== Historical evidence ==
The temple is associated with the visit of the saint Ramanujacharya to Odisha. Chaitanya Mahaprabhu during his stay in Puri used to see the deity form of Jagannath daily. During Anavasara when Jagannath and his sibling deities were taken to the secret chamber for 15 days, he was unable to see the Lord. So as per legend, Jagannath directed him to go to Brahmagiri and visit the Alarnath temple. Still today the Shila over which Chaitanya Mahaprabhu used to do Sankirtana is there. Many historians opine that Alvars once visited this place, but there is no mention of it in Divyaprabandam. But still the temple is considered one among the 108 Abhimana Kshethram of Vaishnavate tradition.

== Temple timings ==
The temple opens at 6 AM and closes at 9:30PM. Baal Bhoga (breakfast) is offered in the morning. At midday, different kinds of rice, daal, and vegetable curries are offered along with kheeri (rice pudding) as dessert. At night, different kinds of pitha and khichudi with plantain fry is offered. During Anavasara time the Kheeri bhoga offered to Alvarnaath Swami is much hyped and in demand.
