= Brahmagiri, Odisha =

Brahmagiri
- Village
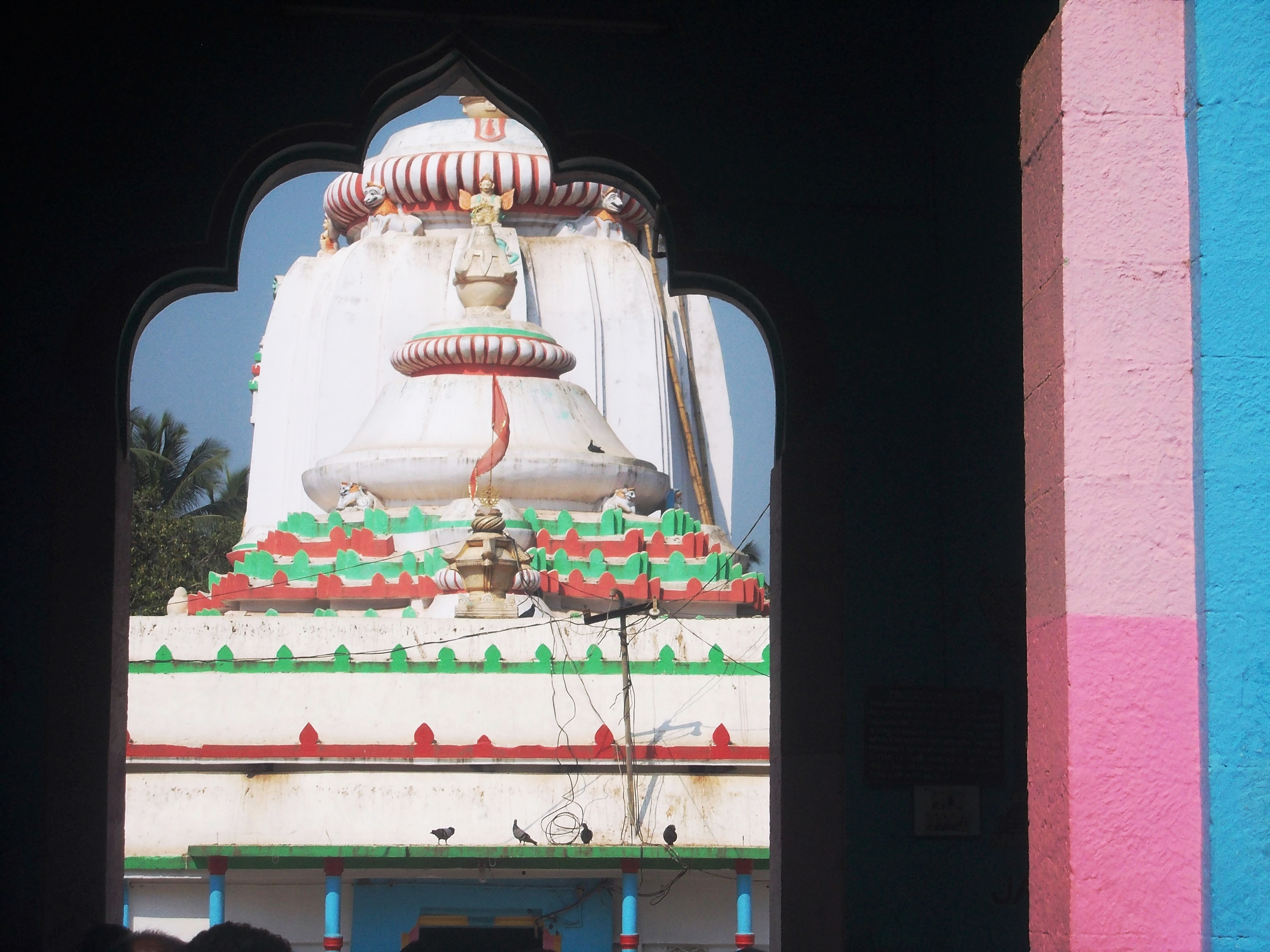
- Entrance to Alarnatha Mandir at Brahmagiri

- Location in Odisha, India Brahmagiri (India)
- Coordinates: 19°48′0″N 85°39′0″E
- Country: India
- State: Odisha
- District: Puri
- Elevation: 10 m (33 ft)

Languages
  - Official: Odia
- Time zone: UTC+5:30 (IST)
- Vehicle registration: OD
- Nearest city: Puri
- Website: odisha.gov.in

Brahmagiri is a semi-urban town in Puri district, Odisha, India.

== Geography ==
It is located at 19°48′0″N 85°39′0″E at an elevation of 10 m above MSL.

== Major Attractions ==
Brahmagiri is famous for the Alarnatha Mandira. Hundreds of pilgrims visit the shrine here during the Anabasara of Lord Jagannath. Baliharachandi is another sacred place and tourist spot. It is around 10 km south of Brahmagiri. It is on sand dunes.

== Educational Institutions ==
=== Colleges ===
- Alarnath Dhandamulak (Degree) Mahavidyalaya, Brahmagiri
- Baba Bhimeswar Sanskrit (Degree) College
- Brahma Vihar Sanskrit (Degree) College
- Biswanath Sanskrit (Degree) College
- Baxi Jagabandhu Bidyadhar (B.J.B. Degree) College, Gadarodanga
- Bhakta Manein Smruti Degree Mahavidyalaya, Kandagoda
- Brahmeswar (Degree) Mahavidyalaya, Dharmakriti
- Ananta Basudev Sanskrit (Degree) College, Palli

=== Schools ===
- Alarnath Dhandamulak Higher Secondary School
- Baba Bhimeswar Sanskrit Higher Secondary School
- Brahma Vihar Sanskrit Higher Secondary School
- Biswanath Sanskrit Higher Secondary School
- Baxi Jagabandhu Bidyadhar Higher Secondary School, Gadaradang
- Brahmeswar Higher Secondary School, Dharmakriti
- Ananta Basudev Sanskrit Higher Secondary School, Palli
- Atibadi Jagannath Das Govt. Higher Secondary School, Kapileswarpur
- Harachandi Mahila Higher Secondary School, Rebana
- Kalucharan Sanskrit Higher Secondary School, Swetavihar
- Manein Higher Secondary School, Kandagoda
- Brahmagiri High School
- Brahmagiri Upper Primary School

== Connectivity ==
Brahmagiri is about 20 km away from the district headquarter Puri. National Highway 203A passes through Brahmagiri.

Nearest airport is Biju Patnaik International Airport at Bhubaneswar and the nearest railway station is at Puri and Sakhigopal is a near by train station as well.

== Politics ==
Brahmagiri is a part of Brahmagiri Assembly constituency and Puri Lok Sabha constituency.
