= Suna Besha =

Hindu festival

Suna Bhesha
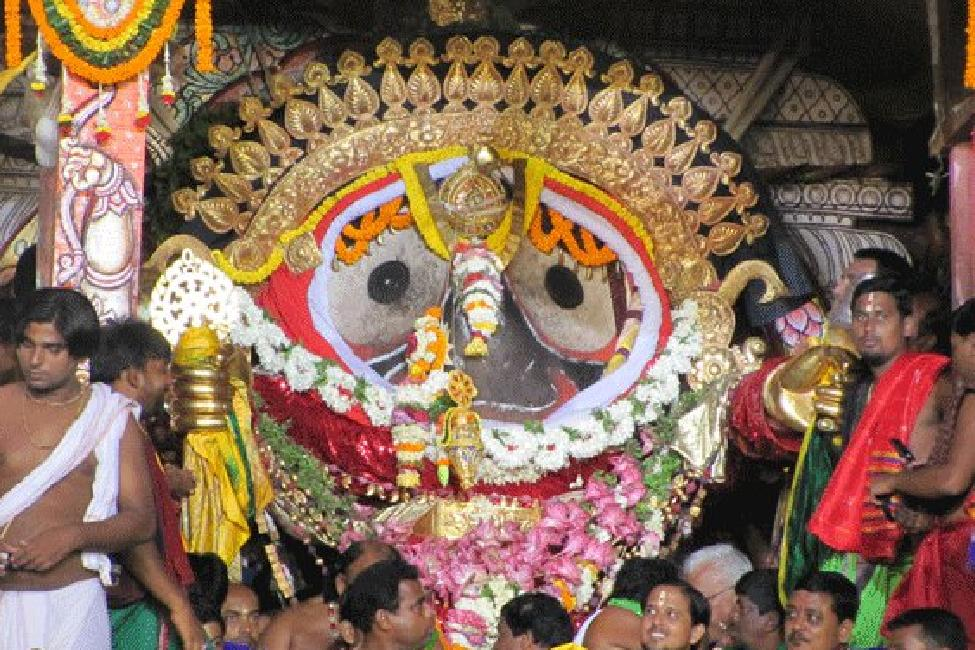
- Also called: Raja Bhesha or Rajarajeswara Besha
- Observed by: Jagannath Temple
- Type: religious
- Date: Poushya Purnima (Pushyavisheka); Falgun Purnima (Dola Purnima); Harishayan Ekadashi (Bahuda ekadashi); Kartik Purnima
- Related to: Rath Yatra

Suna Besha, also known as Rajadhiraja besha Raja Besha, Bada Tadhau Besha and Rajarajeshwara Besha, is an event when the Hindu deities Jagannath, Balabhadra and Subhadra (the presiding deities of Jagannath Temple, Puri, India) are adorned with gold jewelry. Suna Bhesha is observed 5 times during a year. It is commonly observed on [pousha purnima ] Purnima (January), Bahuda Ekadashi (July), Dashahara (October), Kartik Purnima (November), and Dola Purnima (march). The name Suna Bhesha is derived from two words, 'Suna' meaning "gold" and 'Besha' meaning "costume".

While one such Suna Besha event is observed on Bahuda Ekadashi during the Rath Yatra on the chariots placed at the lion's gate (also called Singhadwara.); the other four Beshas' are observed inside the temple on the Ratna Singhasana (gem studded altar). On this occasion gold plates are decorated over the hands and feet of Jagannath and Balabhadra; Jagannath is also adorned with a Chakra (disc) made of gold on the right hand while a silver conch adorns the left hand. However, Balabhadra is decorated with a plough made of gold on the left hand while a golden mace adorns his right hand.

== History ==
During the reign of Ananga Bhima Deva, the king of Utkal, Lord Jagannath was declared as 'Utkal Samrat' or "Lord of the Nation" in the 13th century, and by then the Jagannath Temple at Puri had been built by him in 1198. According to temple history, Suna Bhesha was introduced during the reign of King Kapilendradeva in 1460 A.D. When Kapilendradeva (r.1434-1466 AD) returned home triumphant after winning wars over the rulers of the Deccan (Southern India) he brought a huge bounty which was carried in 16 cart loads (on 16 elephants is also mentioned). The trophies which he collected consisted of diamonds and gold. On the advice of the prominent Tadhau Karana servitor of Jagannath Temple, Puri, Kapilendra Deva donated all the looted bounty to Lord Jagannath, this besha was also called Bada Tadhau Besha named after the Tadhau Karana servitor of Jagannath temple Puri from Karana community. He instructed the temple priests to get ornaments crafted out of the gold and diamond he had donated to adorn the deities on the occasion of the Ratha Yatra festival. Since then the deities, Jagannatha, Balabharda and Subhadra are decorated with this jewelry after the Bahuda Yatra.

== Suna Bhesha within the temple ==
During the 10th bright day of the month of Aswin (October) on Bijayadasami or Dassahara day, Lord Jagannath is fully bedecked as an emperor with all gold jewelry. On the 12th Shukla paksha day of the month of Ashada, after returning from the Ratha Yatra to the main Jagannath Temple, also known as Srimandir, the three deities are adorned with gold ornaments. Again on the full moon day of the Kartika (November) the deities are decorated with gold ornaments. On the full moon day of Pausha (December) and Phalguna (March) also the deities are worshiped when gold ornamentation is done.

A day after the Suna Bhesha event Lord Jagannath and other deities are formally offered a concoction of a sweet juice, known in local usage as Adharapana, which is a mixture made of milk, cream, cottage cheese, plantain pulp, grated coconut, nabata (brown sugar spiced with camphor), nutmeg and black pepper and so forth. The juice is offered as a token to the lips of the deities deified in their individual chariots to break their fast or ekadasi. Following this ritual the terracotta vessel with its contents is broken which is done to appease guardian deities (demi-gods) of the three chariots and the gods deified therein. Devotees assembled at the venue jostle to collect a small quantity of this juice as prasada (gracious gift of god).

== Ornaments of deities ==
The gold ornaments are stored at the temple's treasury known as Bhitara Bhandaraghara. According to the "Records of Rights", the bhandara (store) has 150 gold articles comprising three necklaces of 120 tolas (each tola is equivalent to 11.33980925 grams) weight each, limbs (hands and feet) of Jagannatha and Balabhadra made in gold of 818 tolas and 710 tolas weight. Also recorded are decorative crowns of the deities Jagannatha, Balabhadra and Subhadra in the order of 610 tolas, 434 tolas and 274 tolas in weight. The estimated value of these ornaments is said to run into several crores. The security of all the jewelry rests with the Temple Police force, which is controlled by the Temple Managing Committee. When the jewelry is brought out for decorating the deities in the chariots, armed policemen accompany it along with a minimum of 25 storekeepers. Except the priests and the servitors no one else is allowed to remain on the chariots for security reasons. Devotees get a Darśana or a vision of the Suna Bhesha of the deities from a certain distance.

According to the temple sources, in the past, the total weight of the gold ornaments used to adorn the deities weighed more than 208 kg initially made in 138 designs. However, now only 20-30 designs are used.

The designs of the gold ornaments that are used to decorate the deities are known as: hasta (hand); payar (feet); mukuta (tiara or large crown); mayur chandrika, a peacock feather design which was used as head decoration by Lord Krishna; chulapati (a forehead costume which highlights facial beauty); kundal (hanging ear-rings); rahurekha, a half square shaped decorative adorned across the face of the deity; malas or necklaces of various types such as padam (lotus), sevati (small sun flower), agasti in the shape of moon flower; in a kadamba flower shape, kante (large gold beads), mayoor in the form of peacock feathers, and champa, a yellow flower; Sri chita representing the third eye of the deities; chakra or wheel; gada or mace; padma a lotus flower; and shankh or conch.

The chita or "Sri Chita" decorative ornament, which denotes the third eye of gods, is represented separately for each of the deities; Lord Jagannath's forehead is affixed with a diamond and Goddess Subhadra's forehead is decorated with an emerald (panna). These forehead ornamentations are removed when the deities are brought out during the Deb Snana Purnima. They are then redecorated when the deities return to the sanctum, in the Chitra month on amavasya day (new moon day).

== Controversies ==
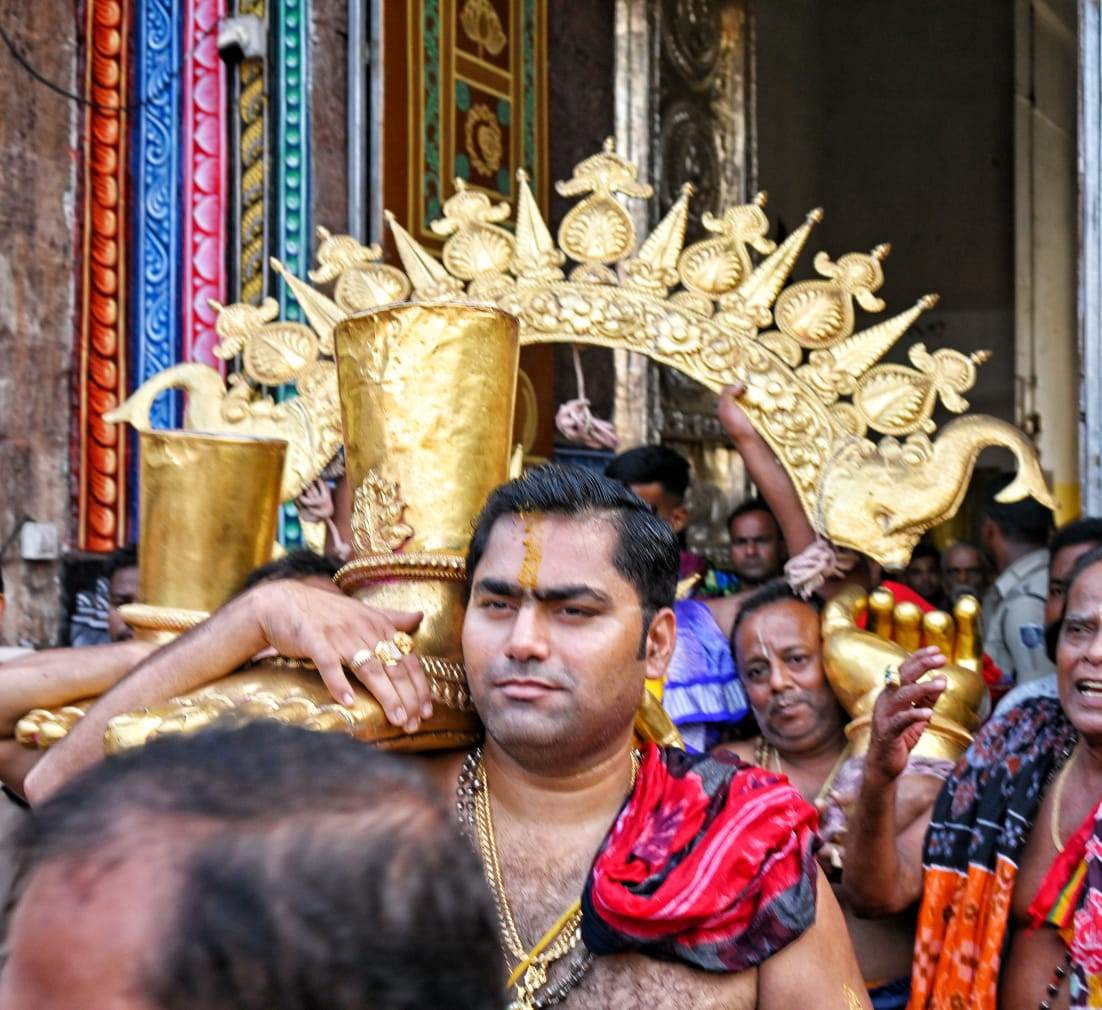
Golden Ornaments of Trinity for 2023 Sunabesha of Lord Jagannath.

The inner chamber of the Ratna Bhandaar has not been subjected to an inspection since 1978, although the outer chamber is opened for various rituals of the Lord. The recent win of the Bharatiya Janata Party, in the 2024 Indian general election has been on the issue of the missing key, to the treasury, since 2018, which was made a key poll point, to oust the Biju Janata Dal.

== Painting ==
A very large painting depicting Lord Jagannath in Suna Bhesha which is of 10.5x6.5 ft size was put on display in Puri during the Bahuda Yatra.

== Bibliography ==
- Manti, J C (22 August 2014). The Saga of Jagannatha and Badadeula at Puri (: Story of Lord Jagannatha and his Temple). Vij Books India Pvt Ltd. ISBN 978-93-82652-45-8.
