= Snana Yatra =

Hindu bathing festival

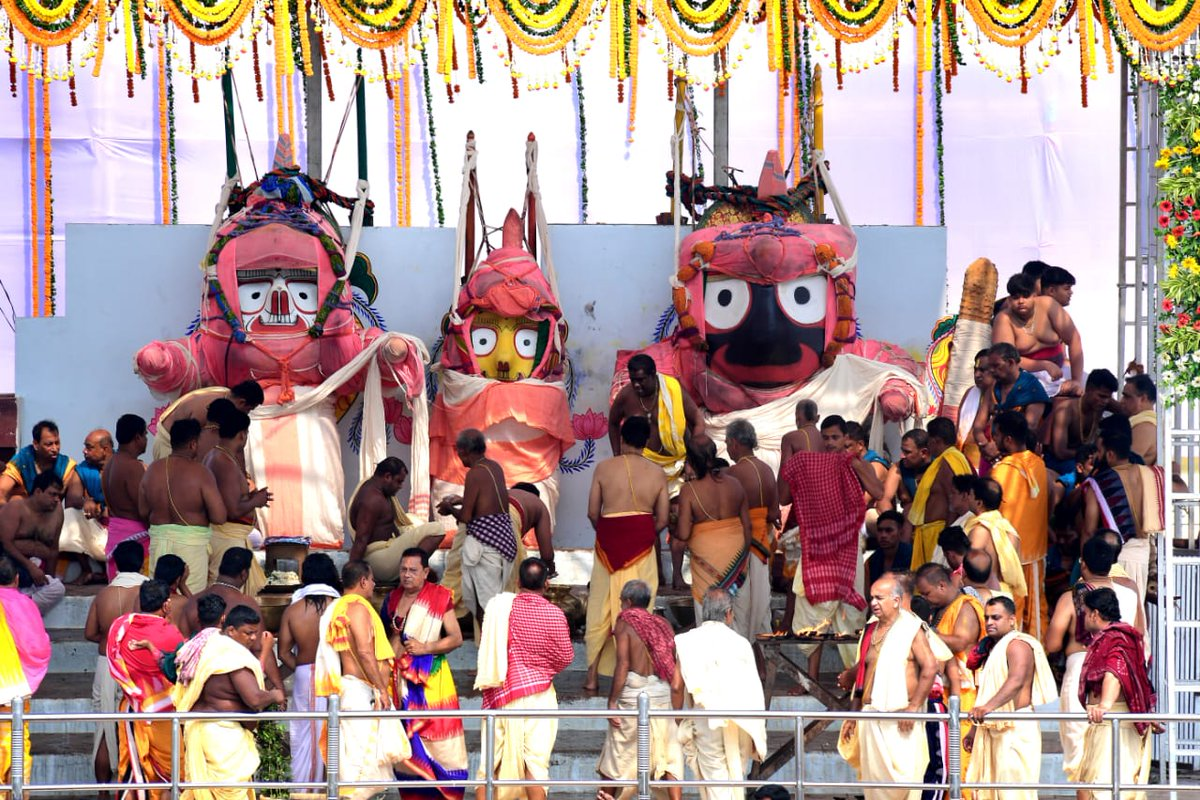
- Snana Yatra at Puri Srimandira in 2022
- Official name: Snana Yatra
- Also called: Snana Purnima
- Observed by: Odia people, Bengalis
- Significance: Birthday of Lord Jagannath
- Date: Jyestha Purnima
- 2025 date: 11 June (Wednesday)

The Snana Yatra, also spelt Snana Jatra, is a bathing festival of deities celebrated on the purnima (full moon day) of the Hindu month of Jyeshtha. It is the auspicious birthday of Jagannath.

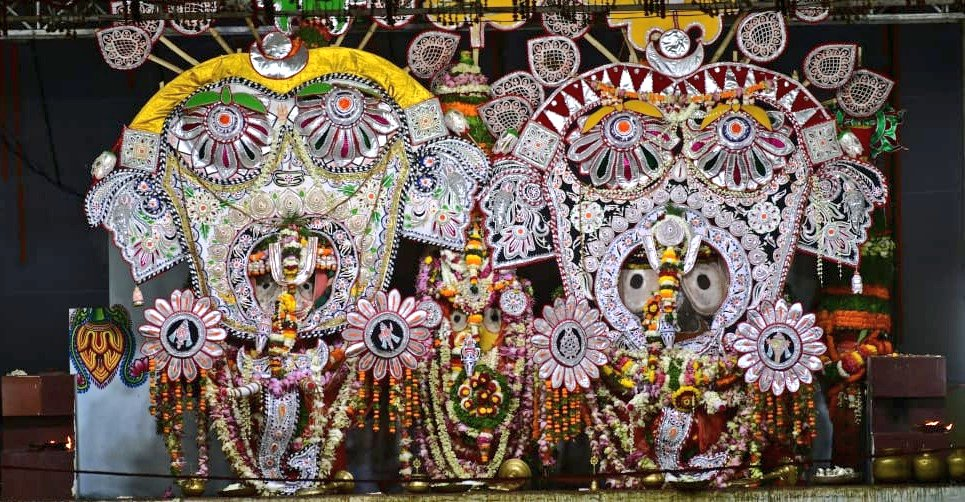
Elephant attire is put on the bodies of deities on the occasion of Jagannath Snana Jatra.

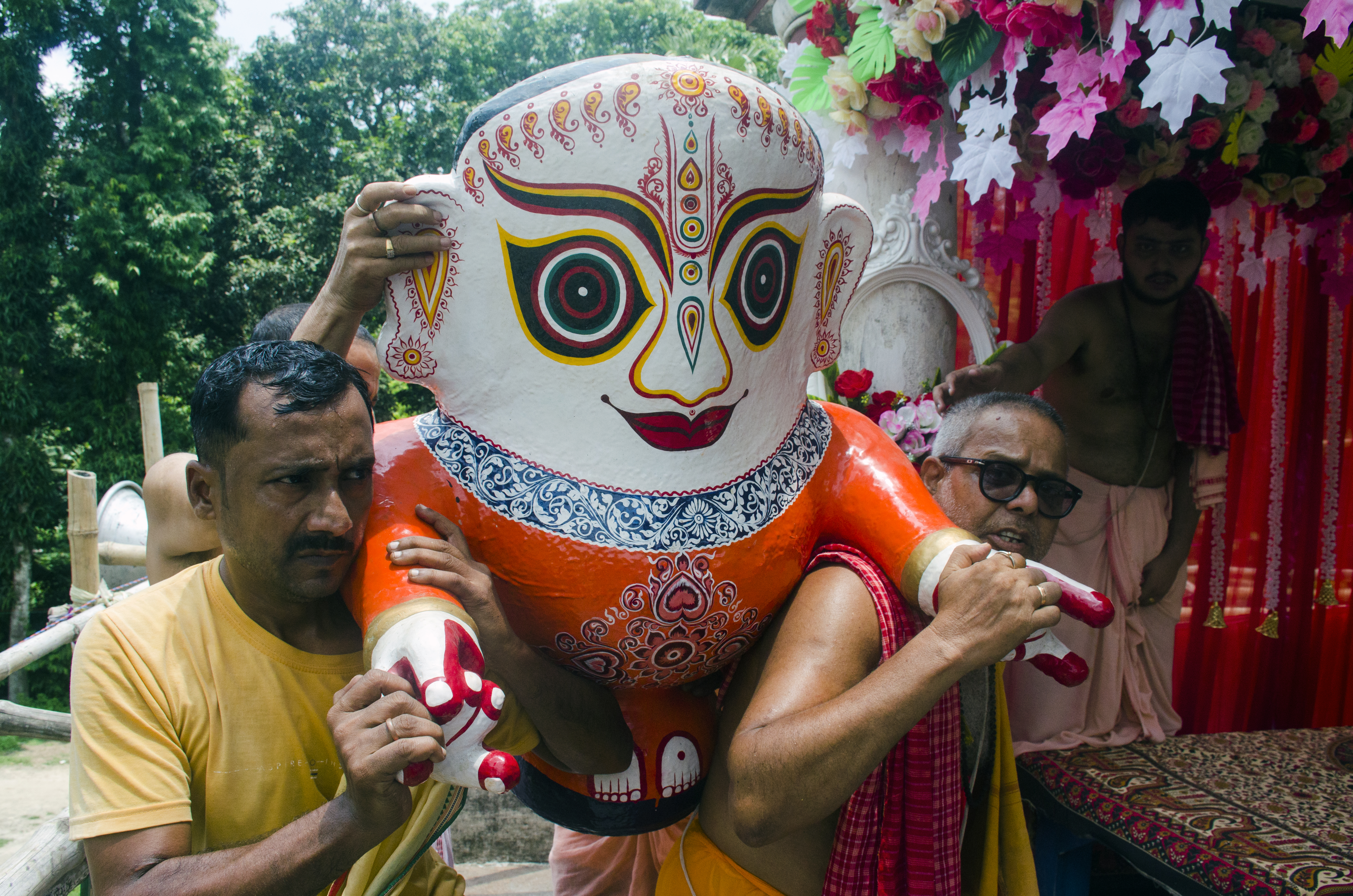
Idol of Balaram is being brought to the Snan Mancha during Guptipara Rathayatra

It is an important festival for Hindus. This is the first occasion in the year as per the Hindu calendar, when the deities Jagannath, Balabhadra, Subhadra, Sudarshana, and Madanmohana are brought out from the Jagannath Temple (Puri) and taken in a procession to the Snana Bedi. There they are ceremonially bathed and decorated for a public audience with the devotees.

== Religious significance ==
It is a belief among devotees of Lord Jagannath that if they make a pilgrimage to see the deity on this day, they would be cleansed of all of their sins. Hundreds of thousands of devotees visit the temple on the occasion. The Skanda Purana mentions that King Indradyumna arranged this ceremony for the first time when the idols of the deities were first installed.

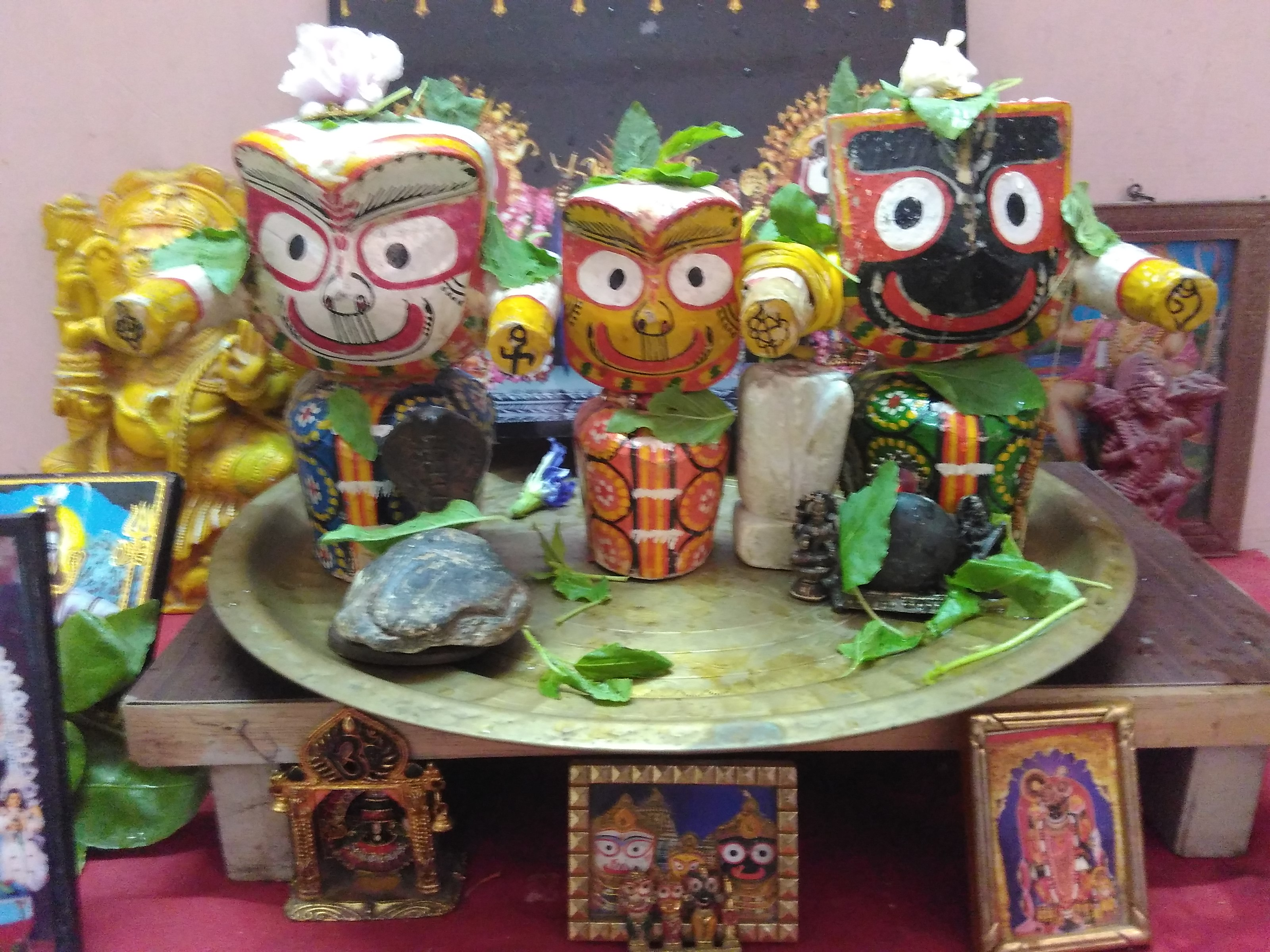
Tulsi is applied on the whole body before taking them to bath.

== Ceremonies conducted ==
On the eve of the Snana Yatra (which means the Divine Bathing festival, in Sanskrit), the idols of the deities are brought out in a grand procession from the garbhagriha (sanctum sanctorum) to the Snana Bedi (bathing platform). Devotees come to view the deities.

On the day of the Snana Yatra, the deities are bathed with 108 pots, of ritually purified water drawn from the northern well of the temple with the accompaniment of religious incantations. In the evening, at the conclusion of the bathing ritual, Jagannath and Balabhadra are dressed up in elephant headgear representing the God Ganesh. This form of the God is called the 'Gajabesha' or 'Hatibesha'.

After the Snana Yatra the Gods are traditionally believed to fall ill and are kept in a sick room to recuperate in privacy under the care of the Raj Vaidya. During this period known as Anasara the Gods cannot be seen by devotees. At this time three pattachitra paintings called 'Anasara Patti' are displayed for devotees to view instead. These paintings signify the Jagannath trinity, with Jagannath as Ananta Narayana, Subhadra, as Bhuvaneshwari and Balabhadra, as Vāsudeva, Shesh Naga. It is said that with the Ayurvedic medication ('pnachan') administered by the Raj Vaidya the Gods recover in a fortnight and resume giving an audience to their devotees.

During the Anasara period, devotees head to the Alarnatha Mandira temple in Bramhagiri in the belief that Jagannath manifests as Alarnatha during this period.

== Celebrations ==
While the most prominent Snana Yatra is held at the Jagannath Temple, Puri, the festival is also observed with deep devotion in various regions across eastern India, especially where Jagannath worship has been historically significant.

=== Mahesh, Serampore ===
The Snana Yatra at Mahesh, Serampore in West Bengal is one of the oldest outside Puri, believed to date back to the 14th century. The accompanying Rath Yatra is considered the second oldest in India and is renowned for its grandeur. The bathing ritual of Jagannath, Balabhadra, and Subhadra is performed on an elaborately decorated platform, attracting thousands of devotees.

=== Guptipara ===
In Guptipara, Hooghly district, the Snana Yatra is an important Vaishnava celebration linked to the region’s historic Jagannath temple and bhakti movement traditions. The deities are bathed in scented water amidst devotional songs, kirtan, and traditional rituals.

=== Mayapur and Nabadwip ===
In Mayapur and Nabadwip, global centers for Gaudiya Vaishnavism, Snana Yatra is celebrated with large gatherings of devotees. Temples conduct elaborate bathing ceremonies followed by cultural programs and feasts.

=== Kolkata ===
Various Jagannath temples in Kolkata, such as the ones at Newtown, Behala also celebrate Snana Yatra. The bathing rituals are performed with sacred water and other dravya items such as milk, herbs etc. and most temples also celebrate "Anavasara" period, keeping the deities in seclusion before Rath Yatra.

=== Other regions ===
Snana Yatra is observed by Odia, Bengali and overall Indian communities across India and abroad. Cities like Bhubaneswar, Cuttack, Sambalpur, Visakhapatnam, and Delhi have prominent celebrations, particularly in temples associated with Jagannath.

== See also ==
- Vata Purnima
- Sevayat
- Jagannath Temple, Puri
