= Ratha Yatra =

Hindu festival

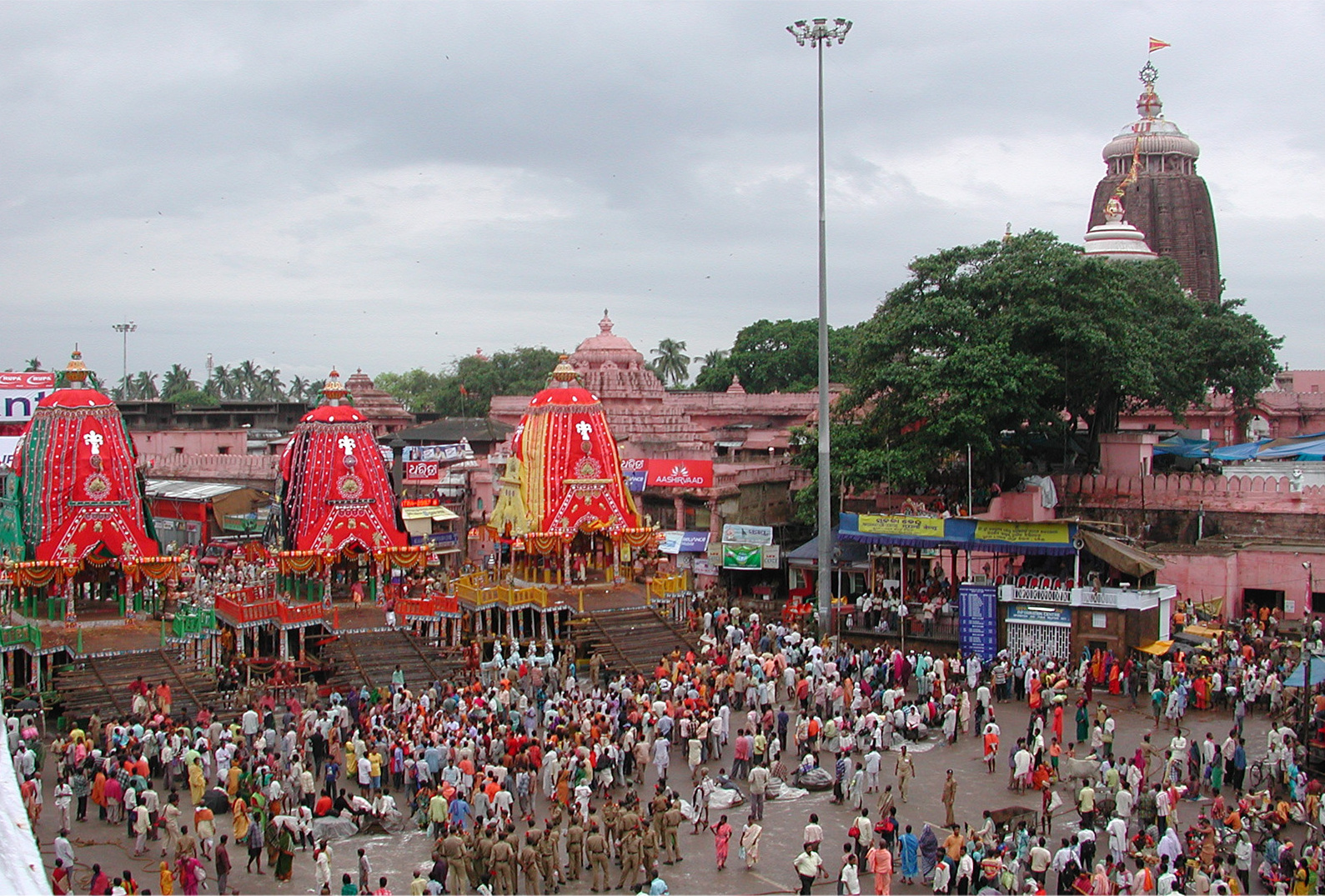
- Ratha Yatra procession, Jagannath Temple, Puri
- Also called: Ghosa Jatra, Gundicha Yatra
- Observed by: Hindu
- Type: Religious
- Significance: Spiritual liberation by participating in the deity's procession
- Begins: Ashadha Shukla Dvitiya
- Ends: Ashadha Shukla Dashami
- 2025 date: 27 June
- 2026 date: 16 July
- Duration: 1 week
- Frequency: annual

Ratha Yatra (Note: Other transliterations include Ratha Jatra, Rathayatra, and Rathajatra.) (/ˈrʌθə ˈjɑːtrə/, transl. Chariot Festival or Car Festival) is any public procession in a chariot. They are held annually during festivals in India, Bangladesh, Nepal, and Sri Lanka. The term also refers to the popular annual Ratha Yatra of Puri that involves a public procession with a chariot with deities Jagannath (Vishnu), Balabhadra (his brother), Subhadra (his sister), and Sudarshana Chakra (his weapon) on a ratha, which is a wooden deula-shaped chariot.

Ratha Yatra processions have been historically common in Vishnu-related traditions of Hinduism—such as those dedicated to Jagannath, Rama, and Krishna—across India, particularly in the city of Puri in the state of Odisha, as well as in Shiva-related traditions, in honor of saints and goddesses in Nepal, with Tirthankaras in Jainism, and among tribal folk religions in the eastern states of India. Notable Ratha Yatras in India include the Ratha Yatra of Puri, the Dhamrai Ratha Yatra in Bangladesh and the Ratha Yatra of Mahesh. Hindu communities outside India, such as in Singapore, celebrate Ratha Yatra such as those associated with Jagannath, Krishna, Shiva and Mariamman. According to Knut Jacobsen, a Ratha Yatra has religious origins and meaning, but the events have a major community heritage, social sharing and cultural significance to the organizers and participants.

Western impressions of the Jagannath Ratha Yatra in Puri as a display of unstoppable force are the origin of the English word juggernaut.

== Etymology ==
Ratha Yatra is derived from two Sanskrit words: ratha, meaning chariot or carriage, and yatra meaning journey or pilgrimage.

According to Vaishnava theology, devotees pull the ropes of the Ratha Yatra as an expression of their identity as eternal servants of Jagannath, seeking his attention and favour.

== Description ==
Ratha Yatra is a journey in a chariot accompanied by the public. It typically refers to a procession (journey) of deities, people dressed like deities, or simply religious saints and political leaders. The term appears in medieval texts of India such as the Puranas, which mention the Ratha Yatra of Surya (Sun god), of Devi (Mother goddess), and of Vishnu. These chariot journeys have elaborate celebrations where the individuals or the deities come out of a temple accompanied by the public journeying with them through the Ksetra (region, streets) to another temple or to the river or the sea. Sometimes the festivities include returning to the sacrosanctum of the temple.

Traveler Fa-Hien who visited India during 400 CE notes the way temple car festivals were celebrated in India.

The cities and towns of this country [Magadha] are the greatest of all in the Middle Kingdom [Mathura through Deccan]. The inhabitants are rich and prosperous, and vie with one another in the practice of benevolence and righteousness. Every year on the eighth day of the second month they celebrate a procession of images. They make a four-wheeled car, and on it erect a structure of four storeys by means of bamboos tied together. This is supported by a king-post, with poles and lances slanting from it, and is rather more than twenty cubits high, having the shape of a tope. White and silk-like cloth of hair is wrapped all round it, which is then painted in various colours. They make figures of devas, with gold, silver, and lapis lazuli grandly blended and having silken streamers and canopies hung out over them. On the four sides are niches, with a Buddha seated in each, and a Bodhisattva standing in attendance on him. There may be twenty cars, all grand and imposing, but each one different from the others. On the day mentioned, the monks and laity within the borders all come together; they have singers and skillful musicians; they pay their devotion with flowers and incense. The Brahmans come and invite the Buddhas to enter the city. These do so in order, and remain two nights in it. All through the night they keep lamps burning, have skillful music, and present offerings. This is the practice in all the other kingdoms as well. The Heads of the Vaisya families in them establish in the cities houses for dispensing charity and medicines. All the poor and destitute in the country, orphans, widowers, and childless men, maimed people and cripples, and all who are diseased, go to those houses, and are provided with every kind of help, and doctors examine their diseases. They get the food and medicines which their cases require, and are made to feel at ease; and when they are better, they go away of themselves.

— Faxian, c. 415 CE

The first European description of this festival is found in a thirteenth-century account by the Late Medieval Franciscan friar and missionary Odoric of Pordenone, who describes Hindus, as a religious sacrifice, casting themselves under the wheels of these huge chariots and being crushed to death. Odoric's description was later taken up and elaborated upon in the popular fourteenth-century Travels of John Mandeville.

There are records of Hindu devotees intentionally casting themselves under the wheels of the chariot and being crushed, as they considered it a holy act. Contemporaneous reports from colonial Kolkata allude to this, describing intentional suicides at the processions which were either tacitly allowed or else ignored by clerics, despite the practice being prohibited by government policy.

== Ratha Yatra by location ==
=== India ===
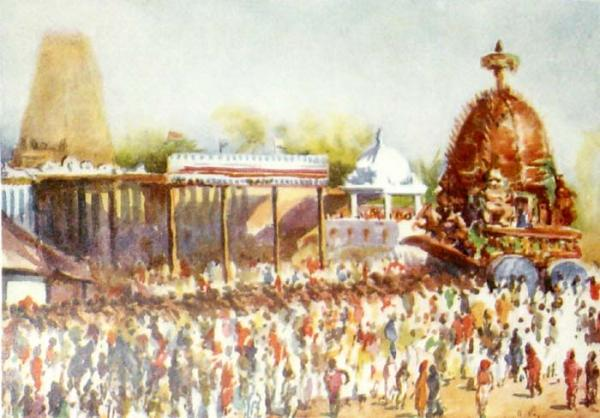
A 1914 painting of a chariot festival (Ratha Yatra) in Chennai

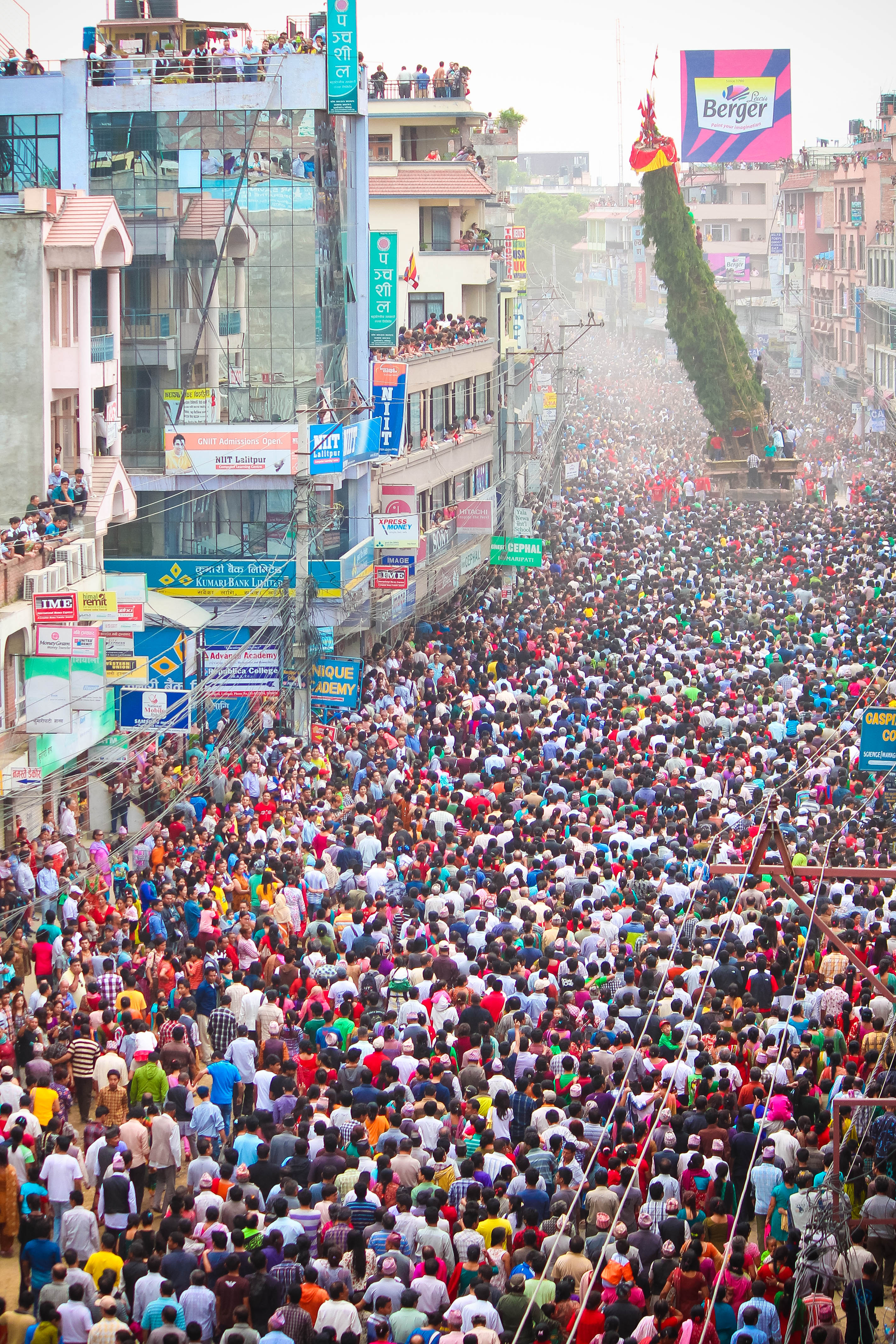
A Matsyendranath Ratha Yatra in Nepal

- Ratha-Jatra, Puri, at Puri in the state of Odisha, is the largest and most visited Ratha Yatra in the world.
- Rath Yatra (Ahmedabad) is the third largest in the world.
- People of Bastar region observe Ratha Yatra during Dussehara.

==== Goncha Festival ====
The Goncha festival is celebrated in Jagdalpur, in the Bastar region of Chhattisgarh, and is linked with the worship of Lord Jagannath. This tradition is linked with the historical connection between Bastar and the Jagannath temple in Puri, Odisha. According to local tradition the Kakatiya ruler Purushottam Dev brought the Ratha Yatra tradition to Bastar following his visit to Puri in the fifteenth century.

==== Tarbha Ratha Jatra ====
During the annual Ratha Jatra at Tarbha in Subarnapur district, Odisha, a distinct ritual tradition is observed where Lord Jagannath is adorned in a different Besha (costume attire) representing one of the Dashavatara (ten principal incarnations of Vishnu) on each day of the festival, starting with the Matsya Avatar on Ashadha Shukla Dwitiya, the first day of Ratha Jatra.

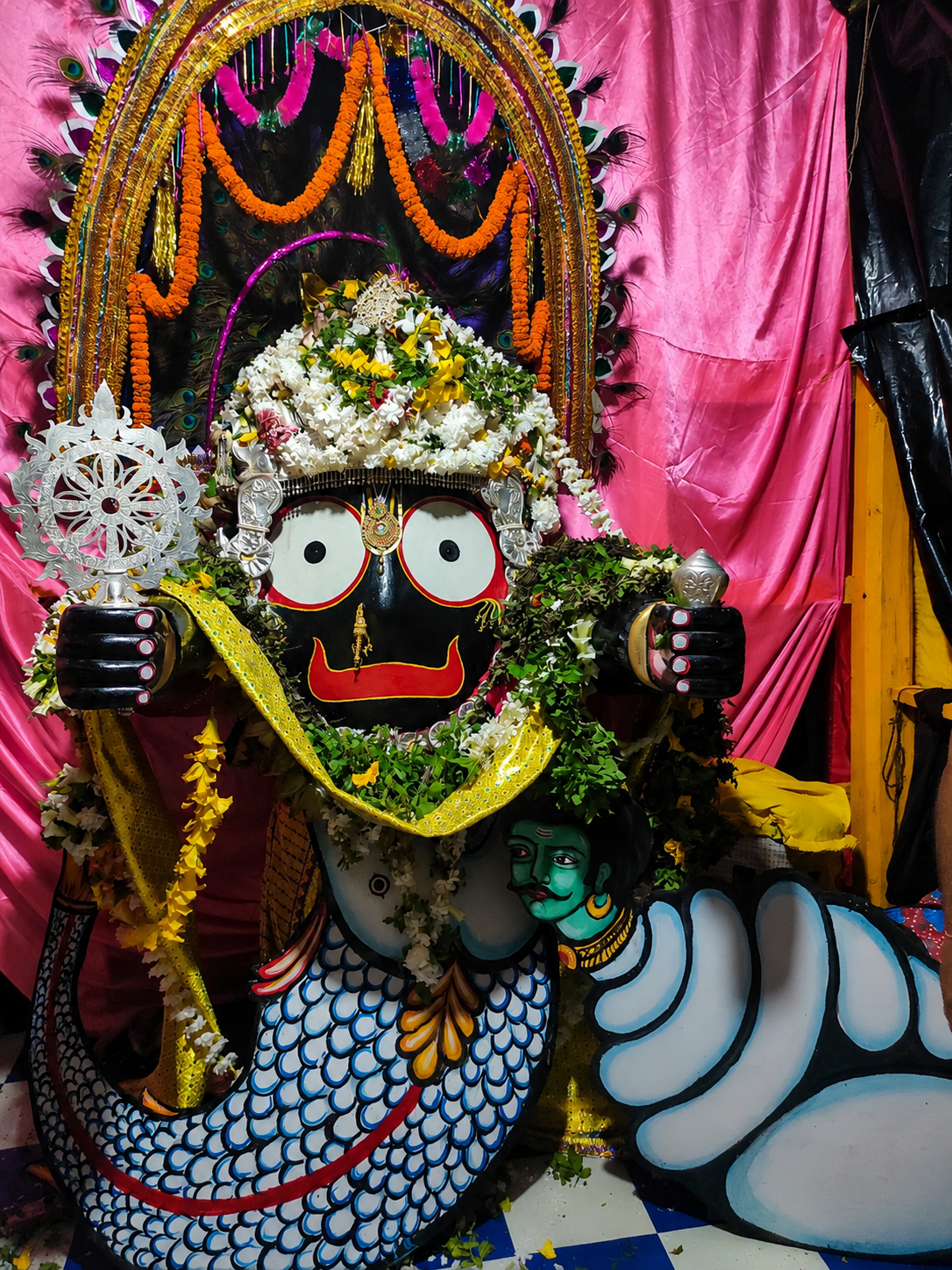
1. Matsya Avatar (ମତ୍ସ୍ୟ ଅବତାର)

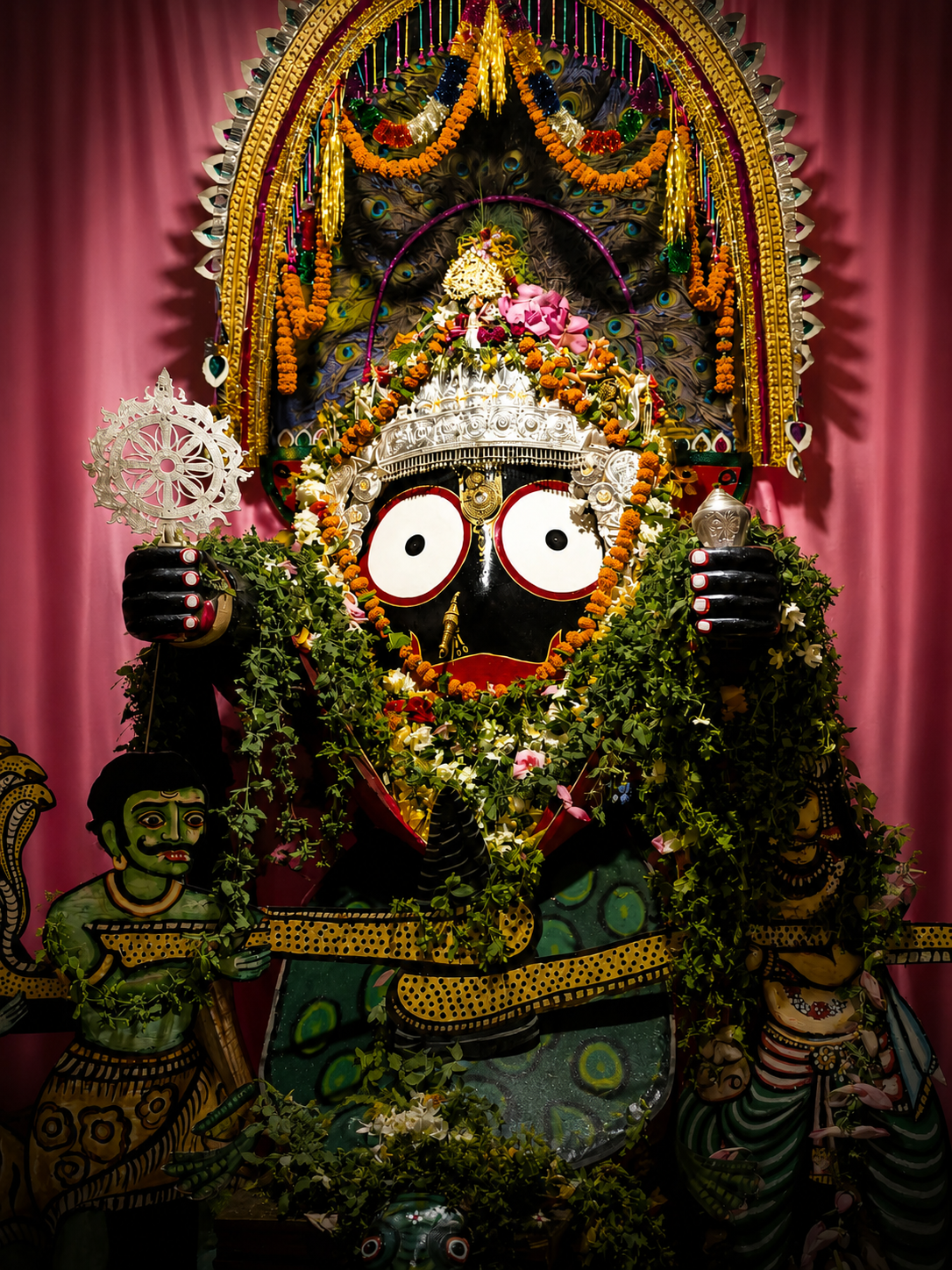
2. Kurma Avatar (କୂର୍ମ ଅବତାର)

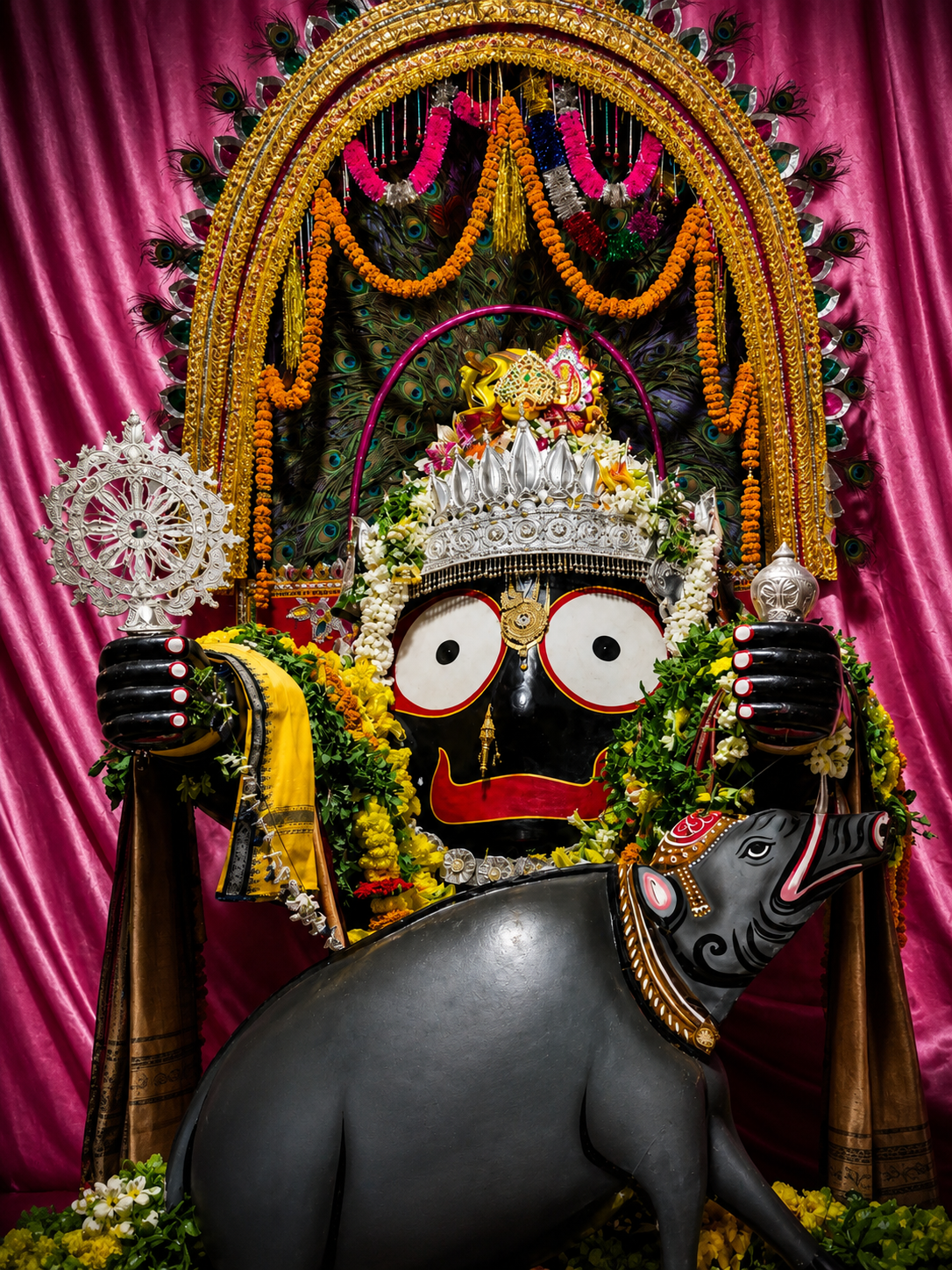
3. Varaha Avatar (ବରାହ ଅବତାର)

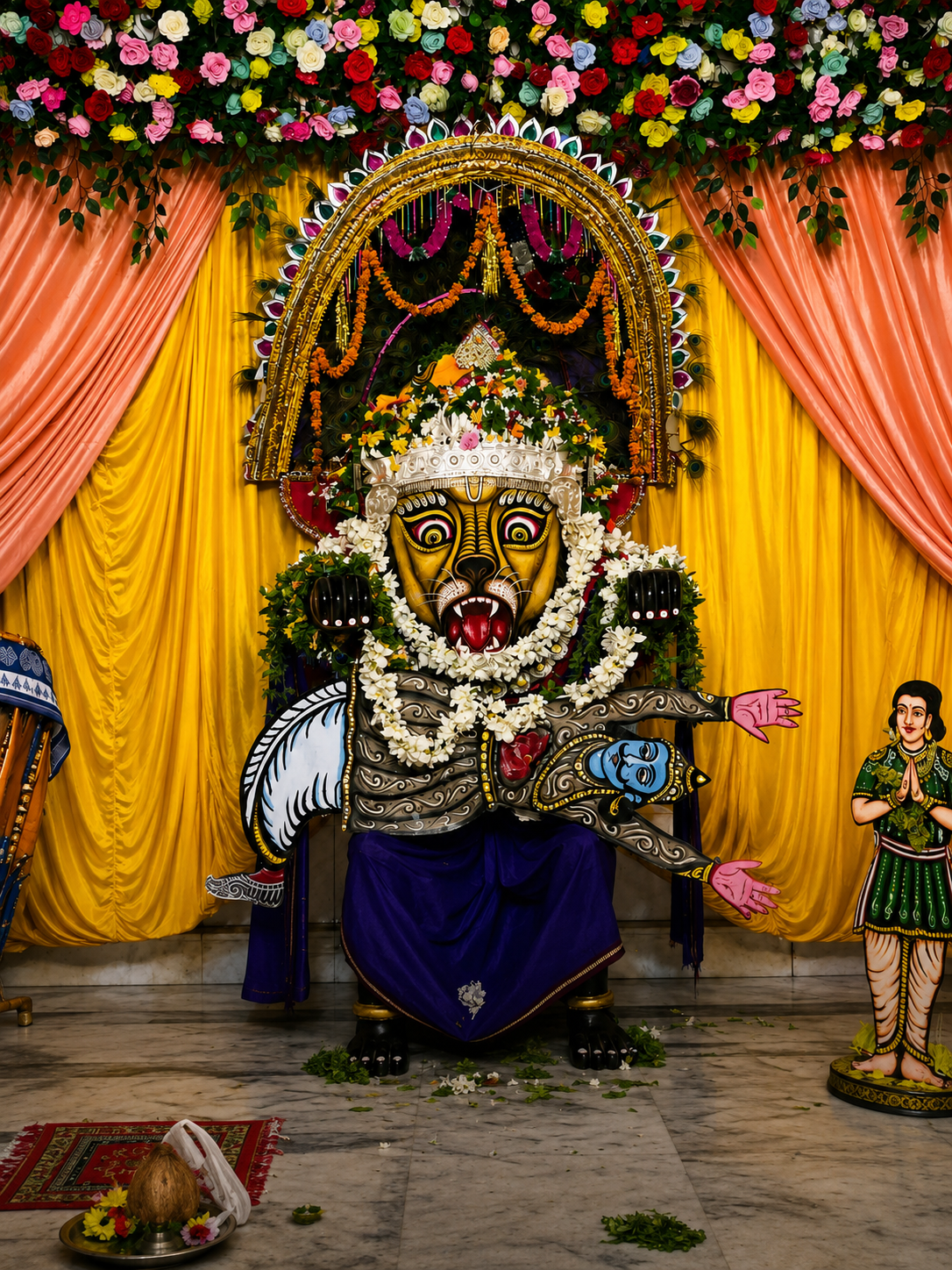
4. Narasimha Avatar (ନୃସିଂହ ଅବତାର)

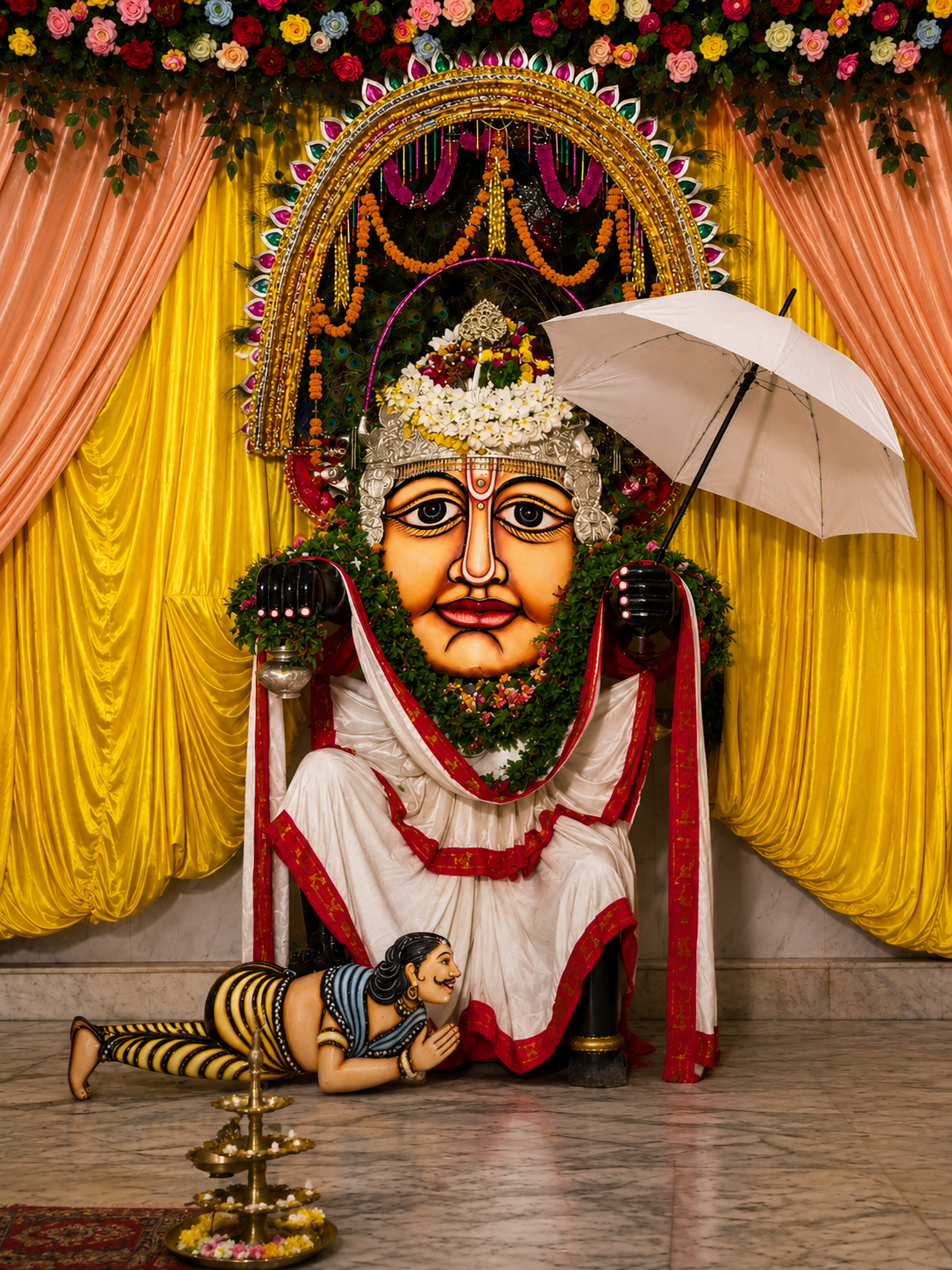
5. Vamana Avatar (ବାମନ ଅବତାର)

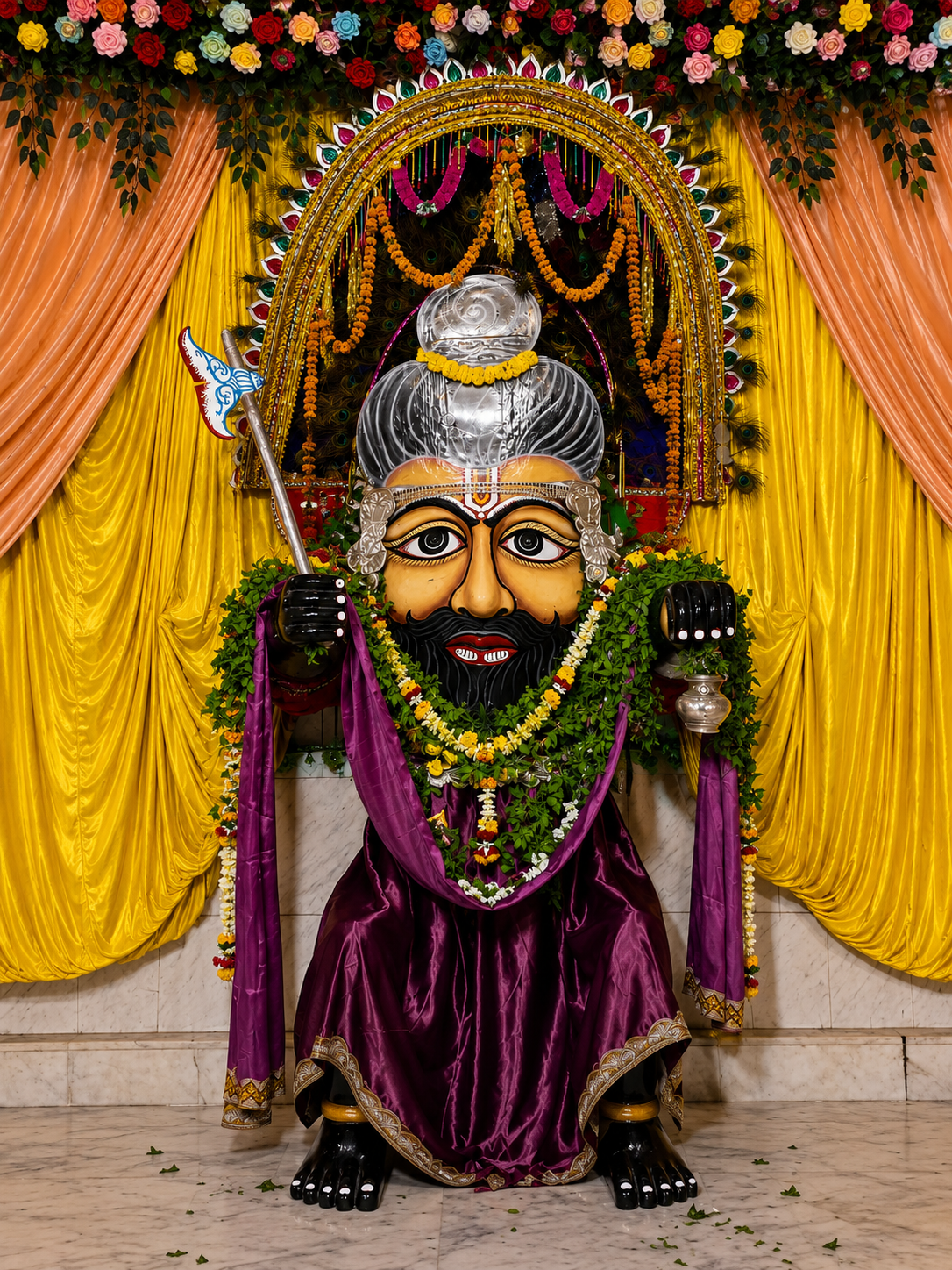
6. Parashurama Avatar (ପରଶୁରାମ ଅବତାର)

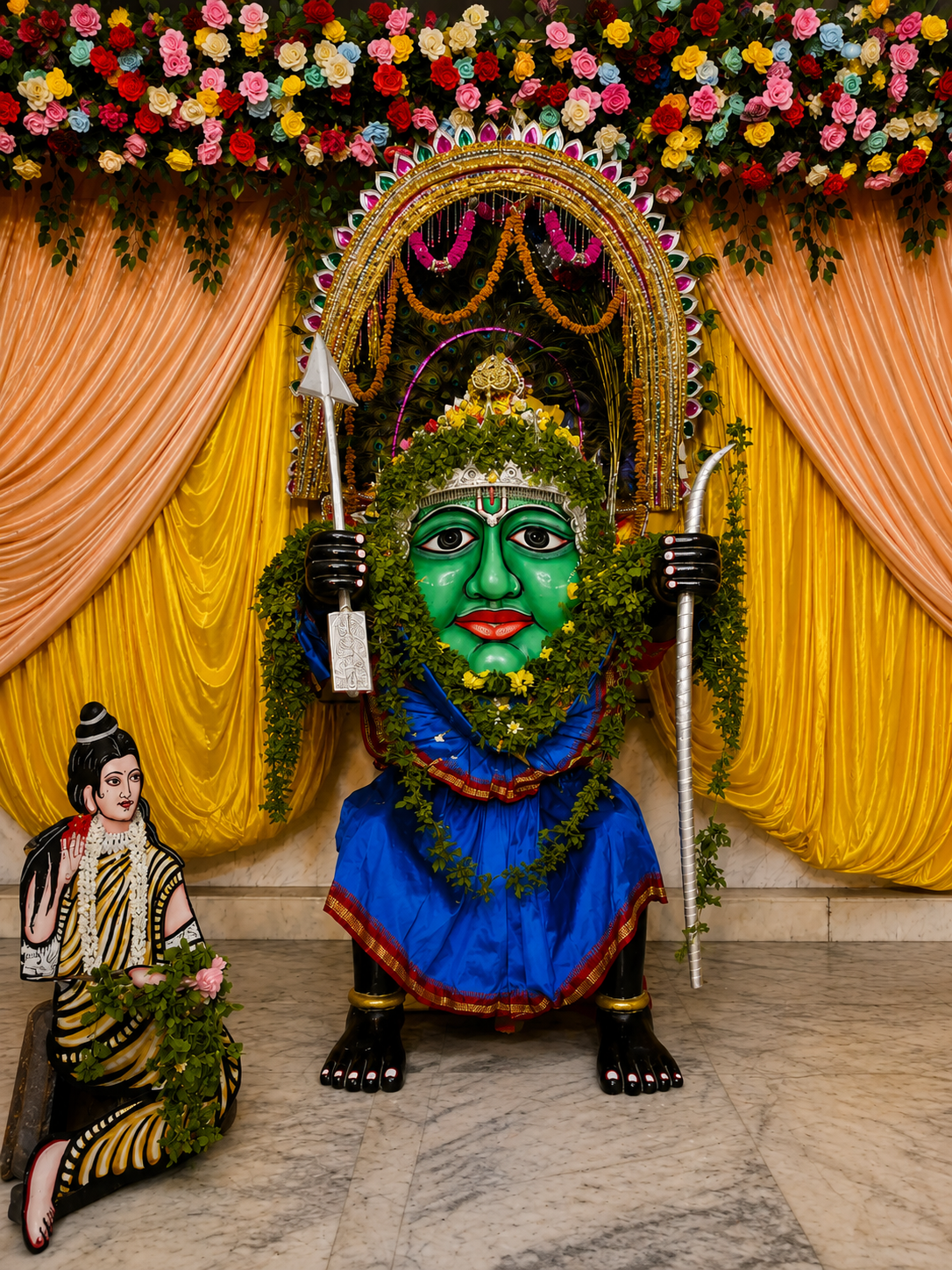
7. Rama Avatar (ରାମ ଅବତାର)

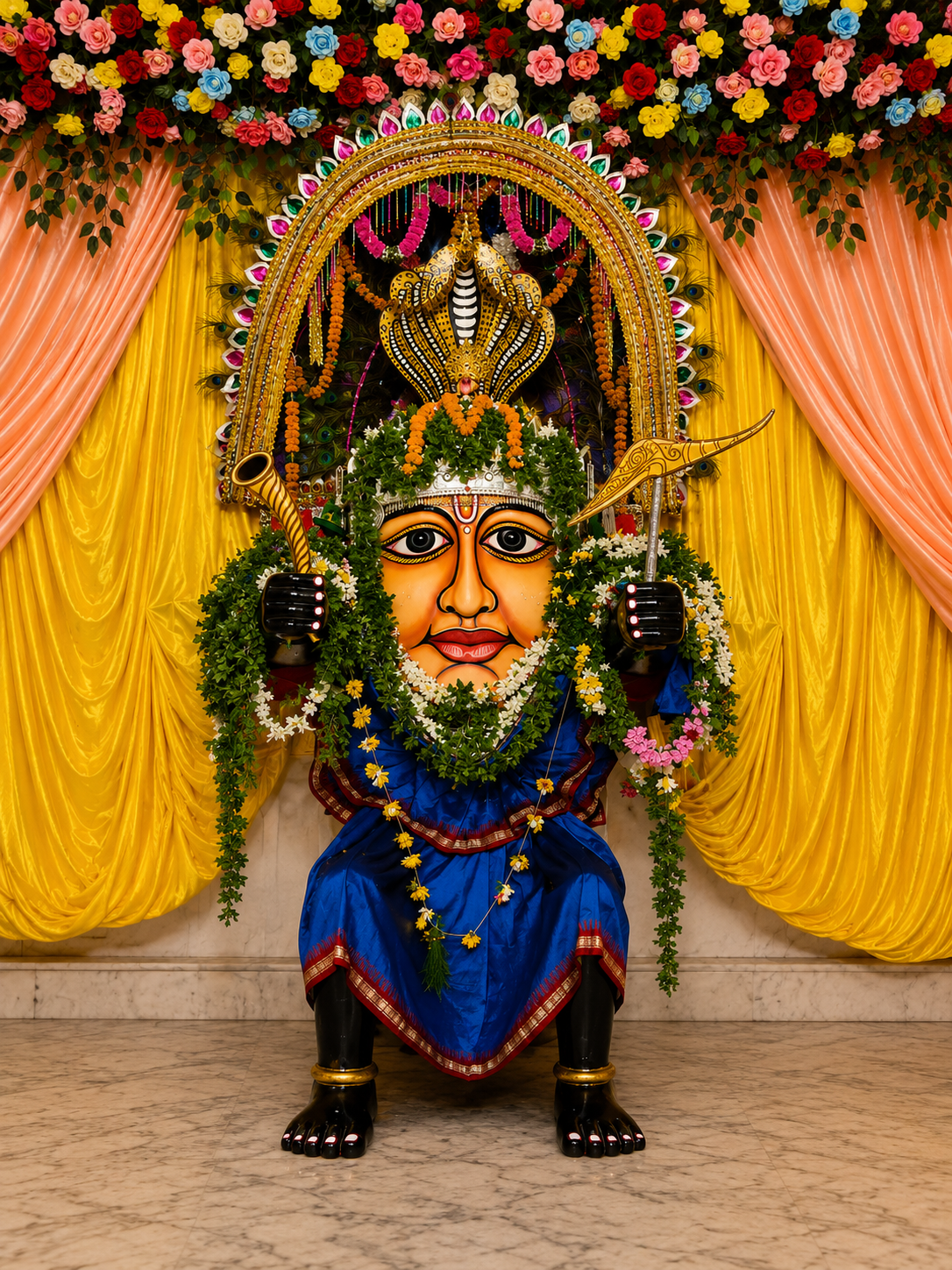
8. Balarama Avatar (ବଳରାମ ଅବତାର)

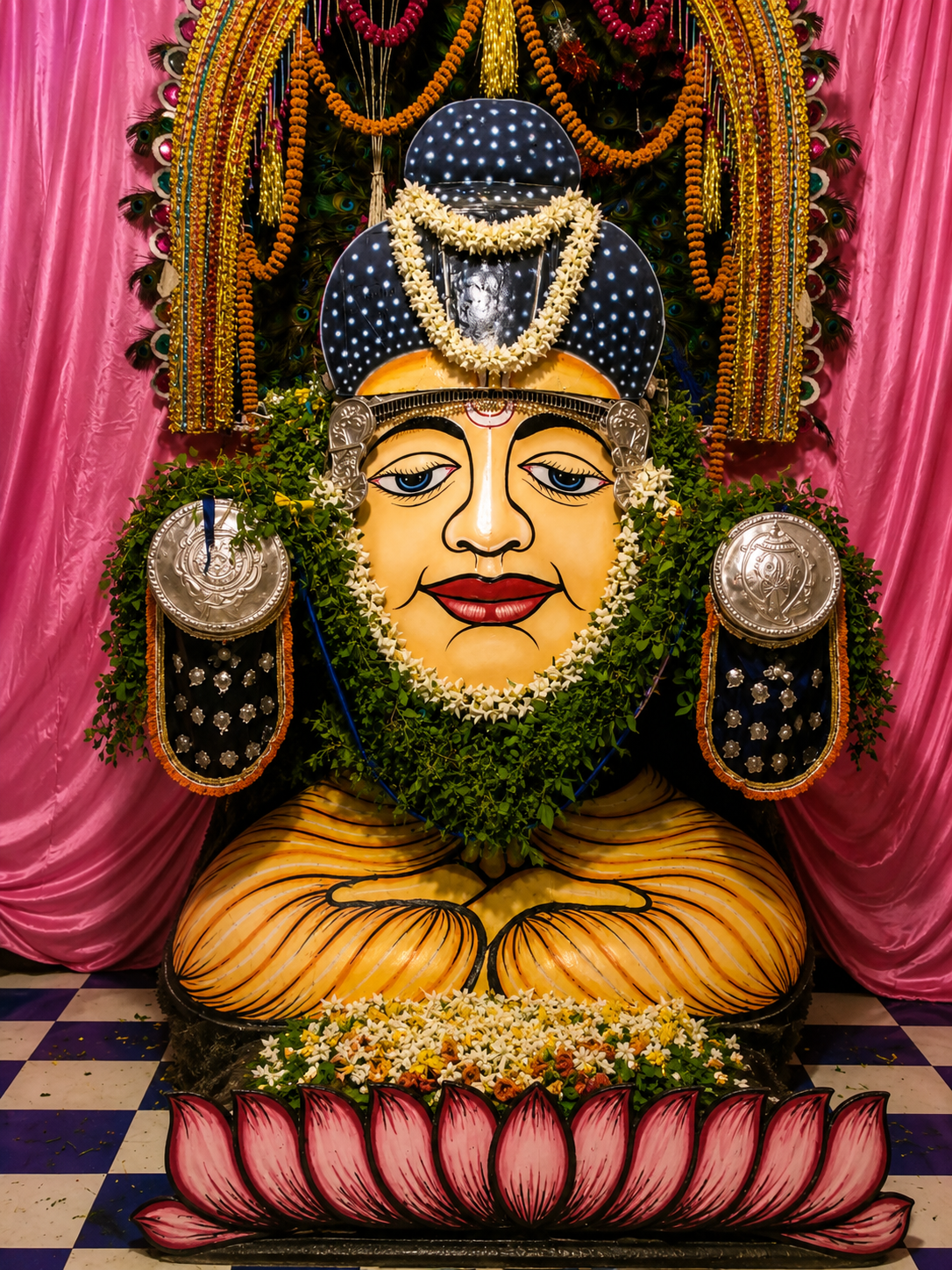
9. Buddha Avatar (ବୁଦ୍ଧ ଅବତାର)

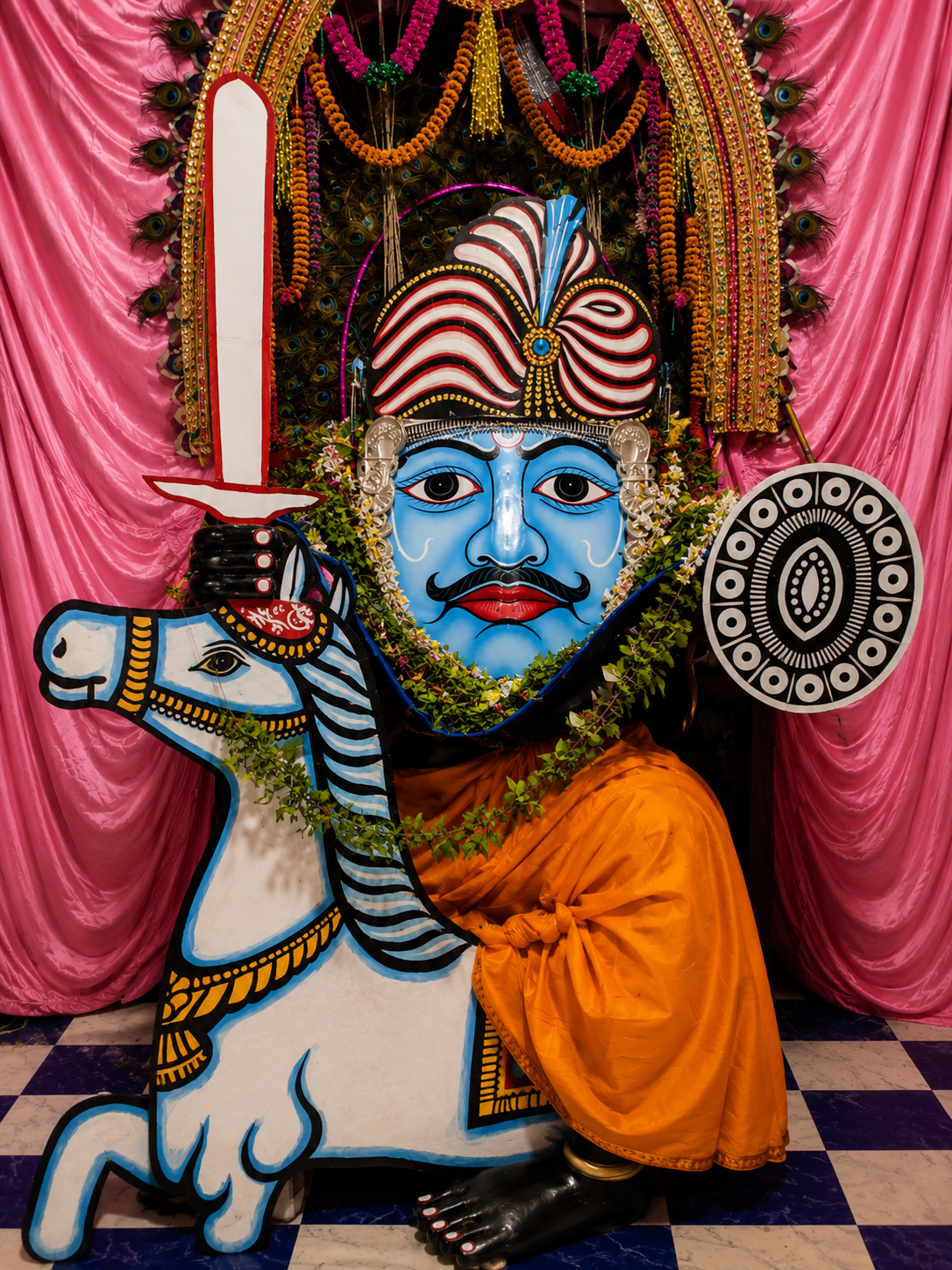
10. Kalki Avatar (କଳ୍କୀ ଅବତାର)

==== Dhamrai Jagannath Rathayatra ====
Dhamrai Jagannath Ratha is a chariot temple, a Roth, dedicated to the Hindu God Jagannath located in Dhamrai, Bangladesh. The annual Jagannath Ratha Yatra is a famous Hindu festival attracting thousands of people. The Ratha Yatra in Dhamrai is one of the most important events for the Hindu community of Bangladesh. The original historical Roth was burnt down by the Pakistan Army in 1971. The Roth has since been rebuilt with Indian assistance.

==== Rathayatra of Mahesh ====
The Rathayatra of Mahesh is the second oldest chariot festival in India (after the Rath Yatra at Puri) and the oldest in Bengal, having been celebrated since 1396 CE. It is a month-long festival held at Mahesh in Serampore of West Bengal and a grand fair is held at that time. People throng to have a share in pulling the long ropes (Roshi) attached to the chariots of Lord Jagannath, Balarama and Subhadra on the journey from the temple to Gundicha Bari (Masir bari) and back. Subhadra is worshipped with Krishna in Jagannath Yatra.

==== Manipur ====
The practice of Ratha Yatra in Manipur was introduced in the nineteenth century. The Khaki Ngamba chronicle mentions that on a Monday in either April or May 1829, the King of Manipur Gambhir Singh was passing through Sylhet whilst on a British expedition against the Khasis. Two processions were being prepared by Sylhet's Muslim and Hindu communities respectively. The Islamic month of Muharram in the history of Sylhet was a lively time during which tazia processions were common. This happened to fall on the same day as Ratha Yatra. Sensing possible communal violence, the Faujdar of Sylhet, Ganar Khan, requested the Hindu community to delay their festival by one day. Contrary to the Nawab's statement, a riot emerged between the two communities. As a Hindu himself, Singh managed to defend the Hindus and disperse the Muslim rioters with his Manipuri troops. The Ratha Yatra was not delayed, and Singh stayed to take part in it. Revered by the Hindu community as a defender of their faith, he enjoyed the procession and initiated the practice of celebrating Ratha Yatra and worshipping Jagannath in his own homeland of Manipur.

=== International Ratha Yatras ===
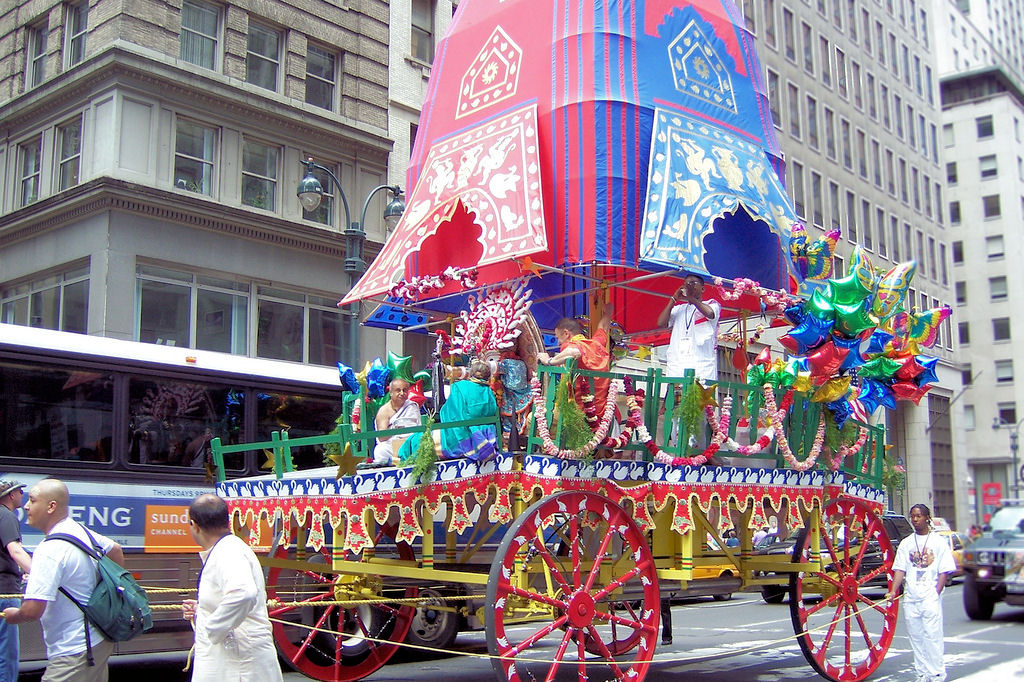
Rath Yatra Festival in New York

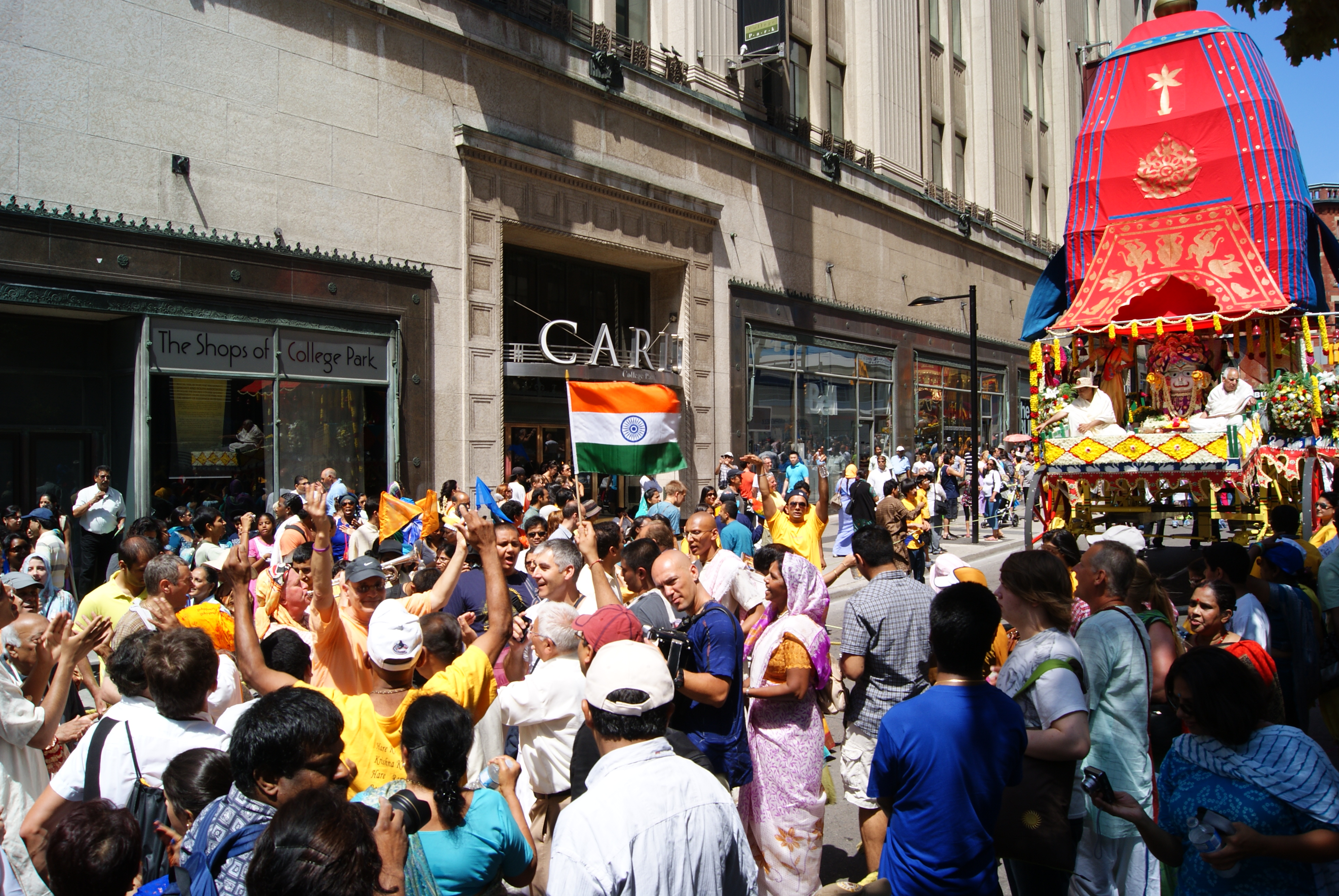
Rath Yatra Festival in Toronto

The Ratha Yatra festival has become a common sight in most major cities of the world since 1968 through the ISKCON Hare Krishna movement. A. C. Bhaktivedanta Swami Prabhupada popularised the festival globally, which now happens on an annual basis in over 108 cities including: Moscow, New York, Houston, Atlanta, London, Rome, Zurich, Kolkata, Mumbai, Karachi, Berlin, Heidelberg, Cologne, Florence, Wrocław, Sydney, Perth, Kampala, Nairobi, Mombasa, Kisumu, Mexico City, Dublin, Belfast, Manchester, Birmingham, Alchevsk, Buenos Aires, Madrid, Stockholm, Bath, Budapest, Auckland, Melbourne, Montreal, Paris, Copenhagen, Amsterdam, Los Angeles, Toronto, Vancouver, Santiago, Tallinn, Lima, Antwerp, Sofia, Kuala Lumpur, Dubai, Oslo, Zhongshan, Myitkyina, Bangkok, Port of Spain, Manama, Rijeka and many other cities.

== See also ==
- Mahishadal Rathayatra
- Guptipara Rathayatra
- Ratha
- Yatra
- Yatra (disambiguation)
- Jatra (disambiguation)
- Hindu pilgrimage sites in India
- List of Hindu festivals
- Padayatra
- Tirtha (Hinduism)
- Tirtha and Kshetra

== Bibliography ==
- Das, J. P. (1982), Puri Paintings: the Chitrakara and his Work, New Delhi: Arnold Heinemann, ISBN 9788190158978
- Mitter, P. (1977). Much Maligned Monsters: A History of European Reactions to Indian Art. University of Chicago Press. ISBN 978-0-226-53239-4.
- Starza, O. M. (1993), The Jagannatha Temple at Puri: Its Architecture, Art, and Cult, BRILL, ISBN 978-90-04-09673-8
