= Mahishadal Rathayatra =

West Bengal festival

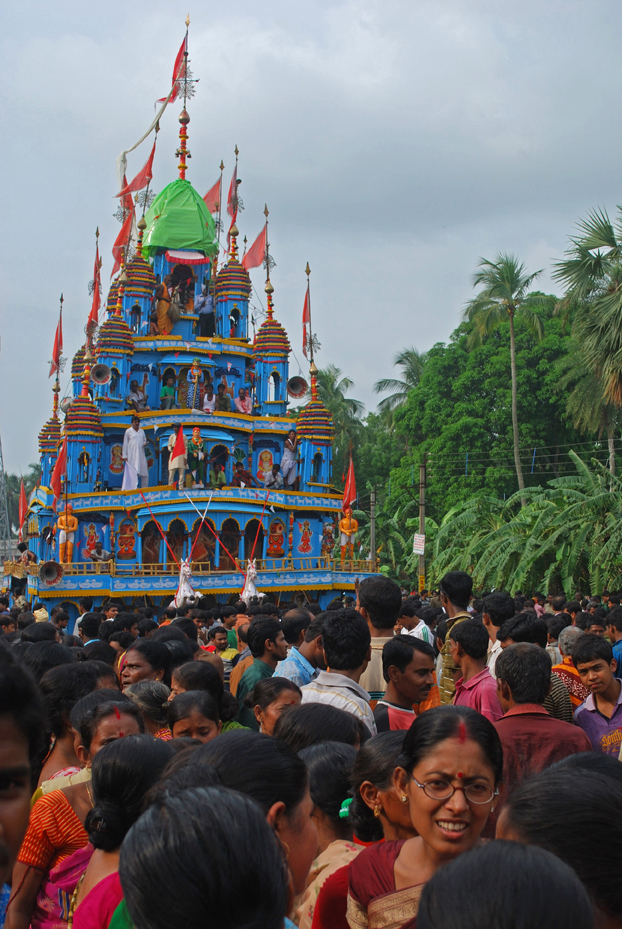
- Mahishadal Rathayatra in 2012
- Founded: 1776
- Founded By: Janaki Devi
- Place: Mahishadal, Purba Medinipur District, West Bengal, India
- Organizer: Mahishadal Raj Estate
- Height: 50 feet (including kalash and dhwaj)
- Wheels: 34
- Style: Nabaratna
- Patron: Mahishadal Raj Estate

The Mahishadal Rathayatra is held annually in Mahishadal in Purba Medinipur District, West Bengal. The Ratha Yatra was founded by Janaki Devi of Mahishadal estate in the year 1776.

== See also ==
- Mahesh Rathayatra
- Guptipara Rathayatra
- Dhamrai Rathayatra
