= Camp Hanuman Temple =

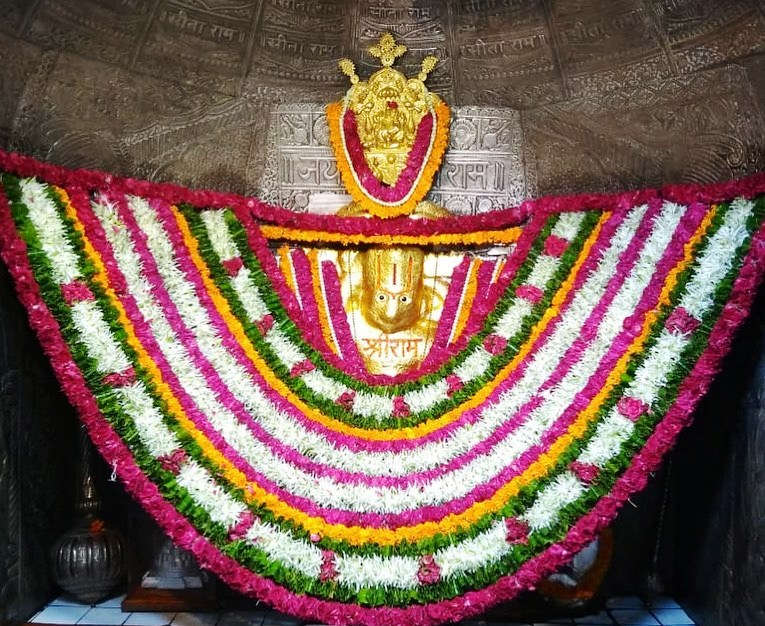
- Camp Hanuman Ji

- Location in Ahmedabad, Gujarat Camp Hanuman Temple (Gujarat)

Religion
- Affiliation: Hinduism
- Deity: Hanuman
- Festival: Hanuman Yatra

Location
- Location: Ahmedabad
- State: Gujarat
- Country: India
- Interactive map of Camp Hanuman Temple
- Coordinates: 23°4′4″N 72°36′14″E

The Shree Camp Hanuman Temple (Hindi: कैंप हनुमान मंदिर) is one of the biggest Hanuman temples in India. It is situated in Ahmedabad Cantonment in Shahibaug, Ahmedabad in the Indian state of Gujarat. The temple is owned by Shri Hanumanji Mandir Camp Trust Ahmedabad.

== History ==
The almost 250 year old temple was reportedly founded by Pandit Gajanan Prasad, a devoted follower of Lord Hanuman. The temple is dedicated to Hanuman and houses an idol of Hanuman, believed to be self-manifested (ie an example of swayambhu).

The temple is renowned for its religious significance, with many devotees believing it offers protection, strength, and spiritual guidance. Given its location within a military cantonment, the temple is closely associated with soldiers and army personnel.

=== Recent attempt to relocate temple ===
In 2021, the temple's trustees proposed moving the temple to the Sabarmati riverfront due to army-imposed restrictions and security concerns but priests and devotees oppose it. The city-based association, Tulaja Yuvak Mandal, petitioned the Gujarat High Court to prevent the temple's relocation.

The association's lawyers argued that the temple was a mythological place with heritage value that had been visited by numerous dignitaries, including the Prime Minister. The Chief Justice agreed saying “I have also visited the place and been told that this is the most powerful temple in Ahmedabad." However, the court said it did not have the power to determine the matter.

== Visiting hours ==
The temple is open until 11:00 pm on Tuesdays and Saturdays, and until 9:00 pm on all other days.

== See also ==
- Jagannath Temple
- Shree Swaminarayan Mandir Kalupur
