= Rathayatra of Mahesh =

Chariot festival in Bengal, India

Rathayatra of Mahesh মাহেশের রথযাত্রা
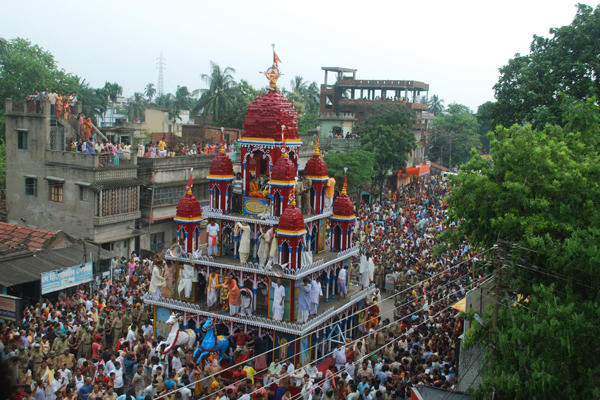
- Mahesh Rathayatra Festival in Serampore
- Founded: 1396
- Founded By: Kamalakar Pipilai
- Place: Serampore, West Bengal, India
- Height: 50 feet
- Wheels: 12
- Style: Nabaratna
- Architect: Martin Burn Company
- Patron: Bose family of Kolkata

The Rathayatra of Mahesh (Bengali: মাহেশের রথযাত্রা) is the oldest chariot festival in Bengal, and is said to have been celebrated since 1396. The first temple of Jagannath Deb was built by Raja Manohar Roy of Sheoraphuli Raj who also donated a large portion of land in establishing the Jagganathpur Mouza. It is held in Mahesh, a historical locality within Serampore in the Indian state of West Bengal. It is a week-long festival and a grand fair is held at that time. People throng to have a share in pulling the long ropes (Rosshi) attached to the chariots of Lord Jagannath, Balarama and Subhadra on the journey from the temple to Mahesh Gundicha Bari (or, Masir Bari) and back within 8th day.

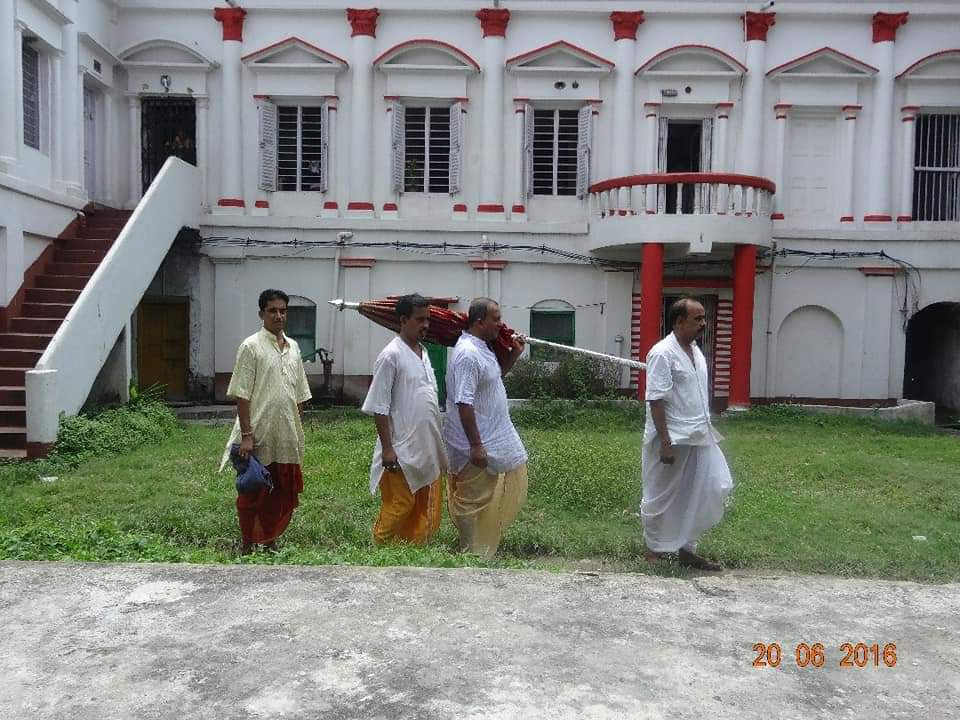
Raj Pujaris of Sheoraphuli Raj along with the Silver Umbrella headed towards Mahesh Jagannath Dev's snan Jatra

== History ==
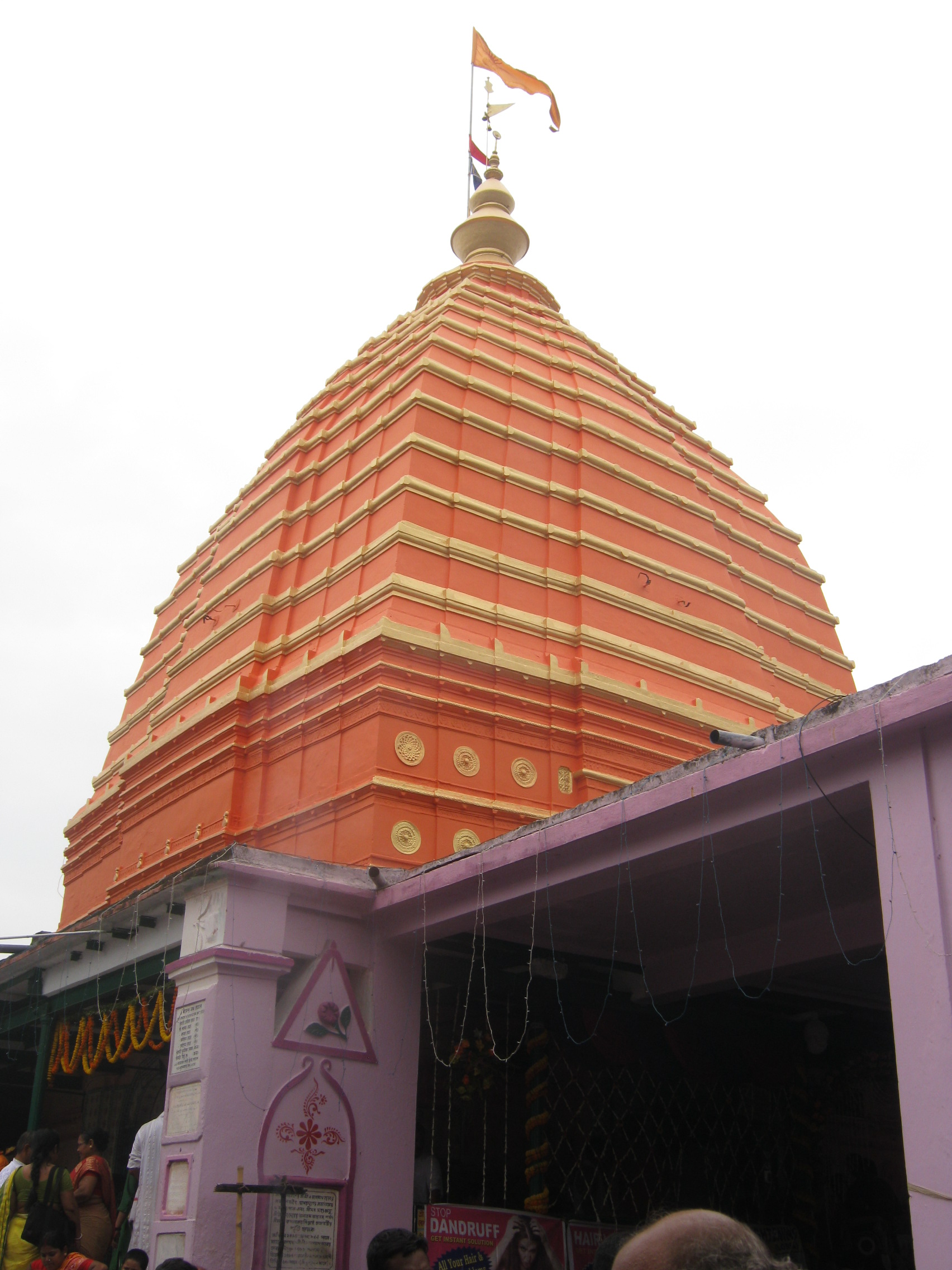
Jagannath temple at Mahesh

Raja Manohar Roy of Sheoraphuli donated land and entrusted Jagannathpur Mouza in service of Lord Jagannath, the initial Mandir was built in Mahesh by the King of Sheoraphuli as it fell under his territory.

It was the fourteenth century. Drubananda Brahmachari, a great Bengali sage went to Puri for pilgrimage. He had a desire to offer Lord Jagannath ‘Bhoga’ with his own hand. But the Temple authority prevented him do so. Broken-hearted Drubananda decided to fast until death. On the third day, he heard the Lord’s voice in his dream, “Drubananda, go back to Bengal. At the bank of Bhagirathi, you will find a place called Mahesh. There I shall send you a huge Daru-Brahma (Neem trunk). Make Balarama, Subhadra and my Idol with this trunk. I am eager to have ‘Bhoga’ in your hand.” So Drubanada returned to Mahesh and started his Sadhana. Then in a scary rainy night, that Daru-Brahma appeared at Mahesh. He jumped into the water and received it. Then he made the Idols of the Holy Trinity and established a Temple.

After taking sanyas, Sri Chaitanya left for Puri. In the way, he reached at Mahesh. After visiting Drubananda’s Temple, he lost his sense, and absorbed in deep Samādhi. Sri Chaitanya christened Mahesh as 'Naba Nilachal' meaning the 'new Puri'. Later old Drubananda requested him to take charge of the temple. On his request he made Kamalakar Piplai, the fifth of his twelve Gopalas, the sebait of the temple. After few days Dhrubananda died.

Kamalakar Piplai was, as it is mentioned earlier, fifth of the twelve Gopalas of Sri Chaitanya. He was the son of the Zamindar of Khalijuli in Sunderbans. He came to Navadwip to study Logic. Later he became a favorite of Mahaprabhu and joined his ministry. He was the first of the 64 Mohantas. After taking the charge of Mahesh Temple, he remained there and it is he who started the famous chariot festival, more than 600 years ago. His heirs still lives in Mahesh and some in Kolkata as the Sebait or ‘Adhikary’ of the Temple.

== Chariot ==
But nor the Ratha neither the Temple of Kamalakar has existed. The modern Temple was made by Nayanchand Mallik of Pathuriaghata, Kolkata in 1755. It cost Rs. 20,000.

Nothing about the first Ratha is known. Once a devotee of Baidyabati donated a ratha to the Temple. In 1797, Sri Ramakrishna’s famous disciple Balarama Basu’s grandfather Krishnaram Basu donated another Ratha. His son Guruprasad Basu renewed the Ratha in 1835. But after some years the Ratha was burnt. Then Kalachand Basu made another in 1852. But one day a person committed suicide inside the Ratha. Taking this as a sign of evil, Biswambhar Basu made a different Ratha in 1857, but it also got burnt. Then Dewan Krishnachandra Basu ordered an Iron-Chariot from Martin Burn This Ratha is still inexistent.

The present ratha or the chariot was constructed under the patronage of Krishnaram Basu by the Martin Burn Company in 1885. The cost of the construction was two million rupees. The ratha is a Nabaratna temple having nine shikharas. The ratha has a steel framework with wooden scaffolding. It is fitted with twelve iron wheels each measuring twelve inches in circumference. The ratha is four storied, measuring 50 feet in height and 125 tonnes in weight. Two copper horses are attached to the front.

== Festival ==
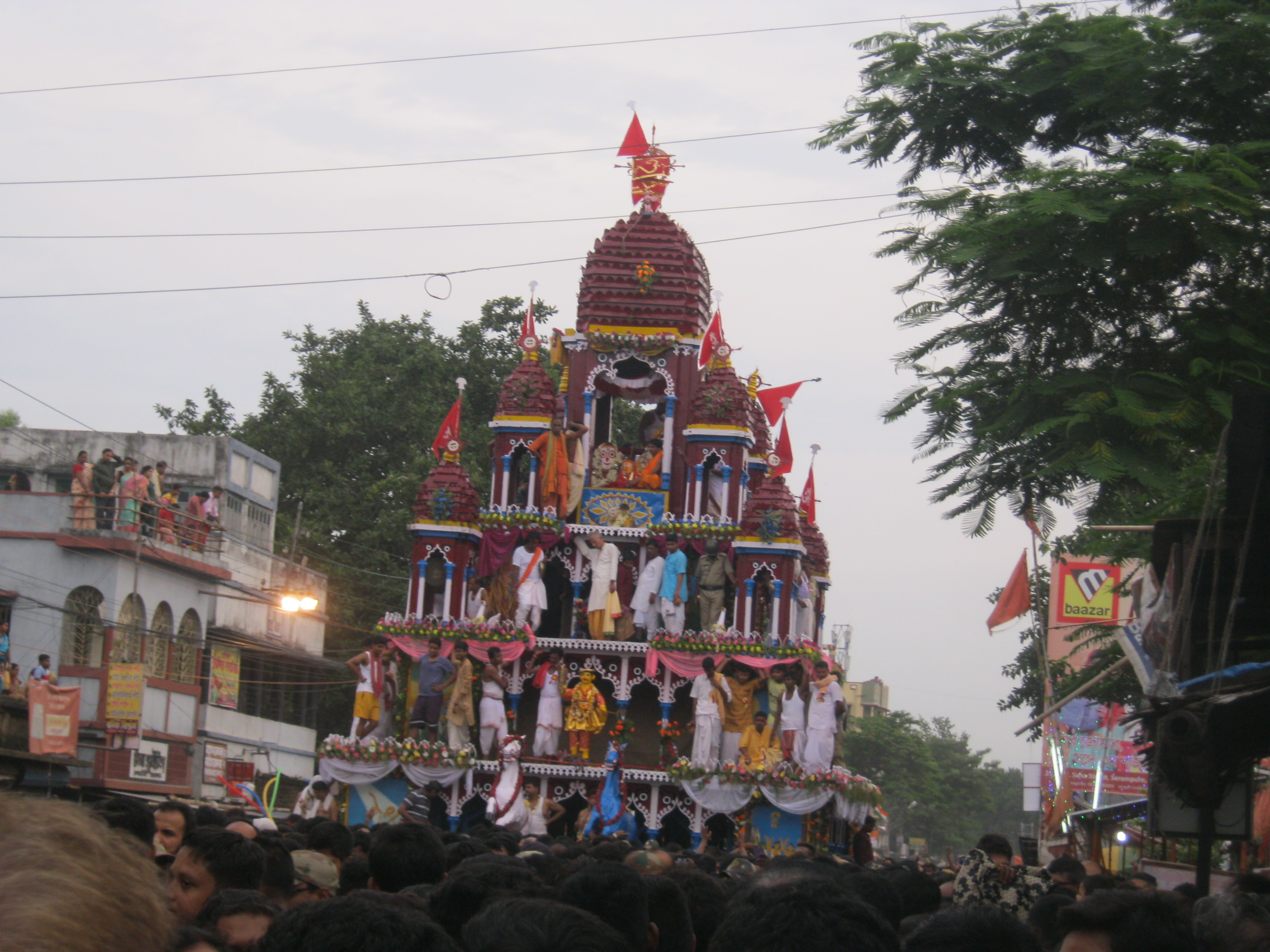
Rathayatra of Mahesh in 2016

The snanayatra is held on the full moon day preceding the rathayatra. On the day of snanyatra, the idols of Jagannath, Balaram and Subhadra are bathed in generous quantities of milk and Ganges water. It is believed that the idols suffer from fever due to the heavy bath. So three physicians, one each from Arambag, Goghat and Ghatal are summoned to treat the deities. They offer a liquid mixture as the medicine, which are then administered on the idols. Gradually their fever lapses and they regain normal health.

Unlike the idols in Puri's Jagannath temple which are changed every twelve years, the same idols prepared by the founder Kamalakar Pipilai is used till date. However, two days after the snanayatra and just two weeks before the rathayatra, the angaraga ceremony is held. This is a three-day ceremony where the idols are repainted using herbal pigments behind closed doors. The artist covers his face and hairs while painting the idols and has only one vegetable meal a day for three days. He doesn't charge any money for the services.

A day before the rathayatra, Jagannath is sworn in as the king. On the day of the rathayatra, the Jagannath idol placed on the highest storey of the ratha. The idols of Balaram and Subhadra are also placed in the ratha. A neelkantha bird is brought and made to sit at the topmost shikhara of the chariot. When the bird flies away the procession starts.

This festival is not only the oldest but also the biggest Ratha Jatra in Bengal. Nearly 2-3 lakh people come to see the month-long fair. Lord goes to Gundicha Temple and remains there till Punarjatra, or Ultorath, as it is popularly known in Bengal.

Sri Ramakrishna Paramahamsa, his wife Sarada Devi, dramatist Girish Chandra Ghosh and others came to visit the famous fair of the lord.

== In popular culture ==
Bankim Chandra Chatterjee’s famous novel ‘Radharani’ consists of a description of Mahesh Rathayatra. Radharani, the little heroine of the novel got lost in the fair, and then found by her future lover. Bankim’s description does not only gives a vivid picture of the festival but also it gave the fair a literary charm.

== See also ==
- Mahishadal Rathayatra
- Guptipara Rathayatra
- Dhamrai Rathayatra
