= Jagannath Temple, Ahmedabad =

Jagannath Temple
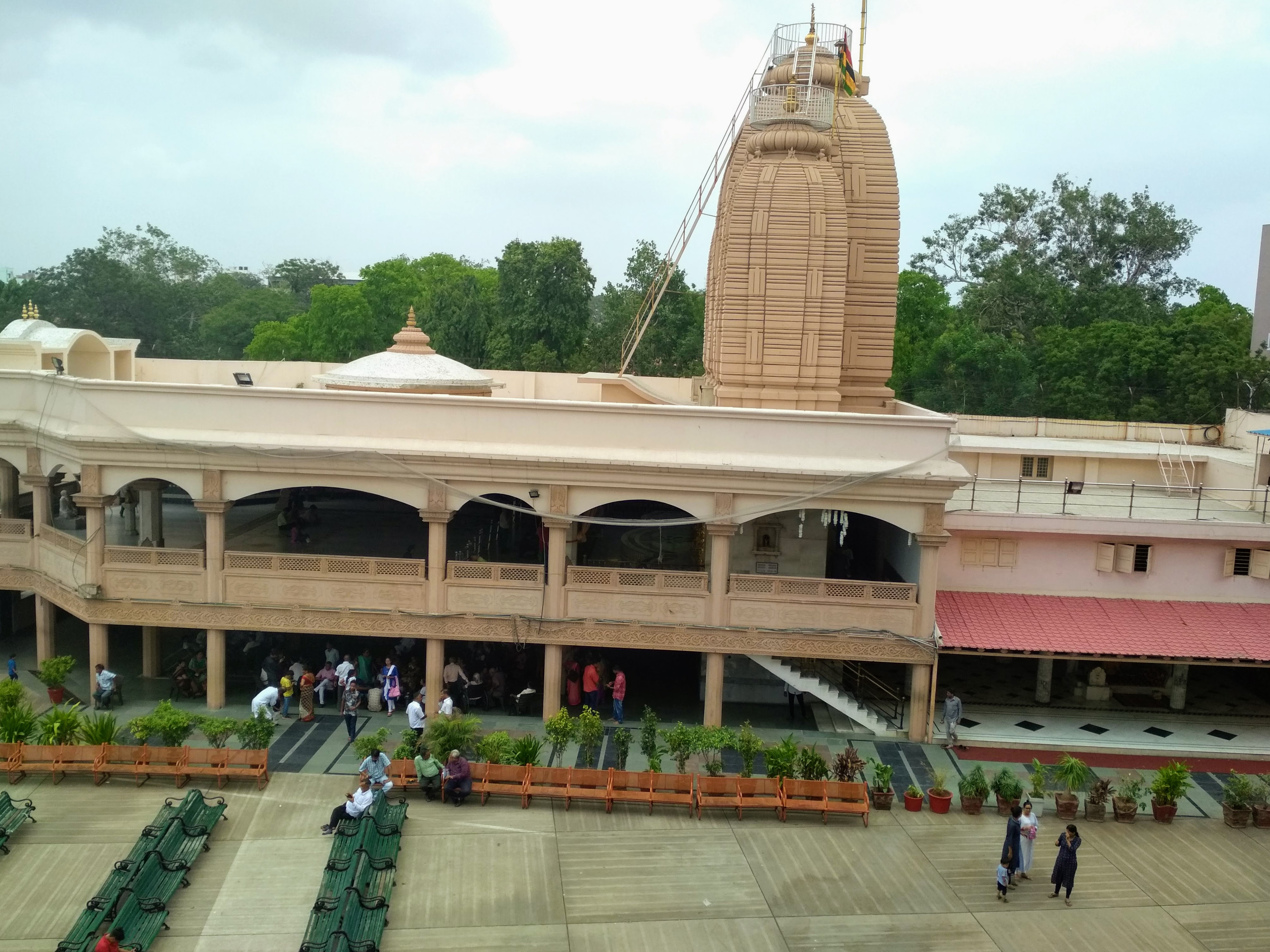

- Location within Ahmedabad Location within Gujarat

Religion
- Affiliation: Hinduism
- District: Ahmedabad
- Deity: Jagannath
- Festival: Rath yatra (Ahmedabad)
- Governing body: Shree Jagannath Mandir Trust Committee

Location
- Location: Jamalpur, Ahmedabad
- State: Gujarat
- Country: india
- Coordinates: 23°00′41.1″N 72°34′51.2″E

Website
- www.jagannathjiahd.org

The Jagannath Temple is a temple dedicated to the Hindu God Jagannath in the city of Ahmedabad in the Gujarat state of India. The temple is famous for its annual chariot festival, the Rath Yatra, which is the third most important and largest after the Ratha Yatra at Puri. The temple remains open for devotees from 04:30 AM to 01:00 PM and 03:00 PM to 09:00 PM daily.

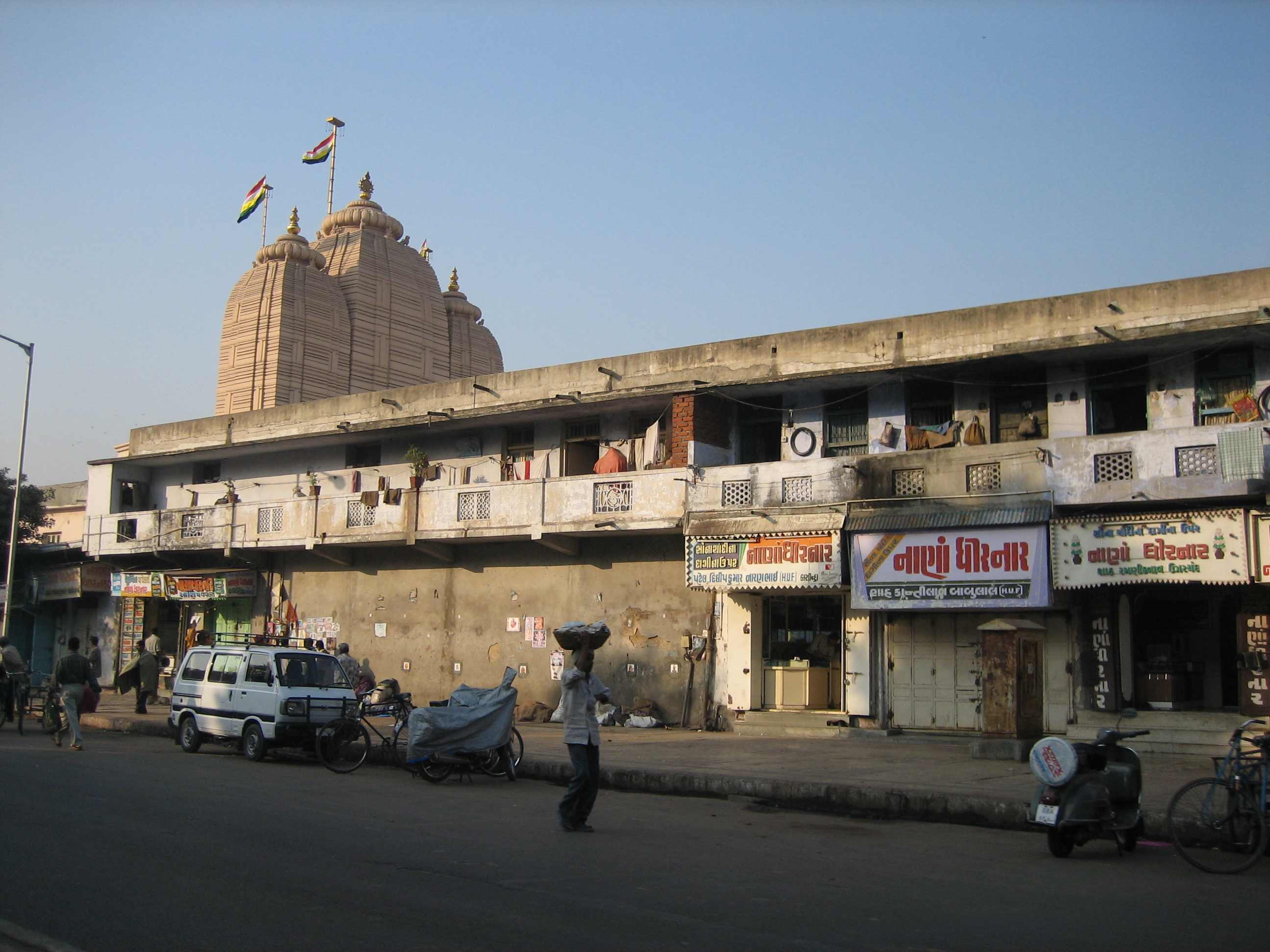
The spire of Jagannath temple, Ahmedabad

== The Rath Yatra ==
The annual Rath Yatra coincides with the Rath Yatra in Puri. As per tradition elephants have the first glimpse of Jagannath, his brother Balabhadra and sister Subhadra and lead the procession. The Chief Minister of Gujarat performs the 'Pahind Vidhi' or the symbolic cleaning of the path for chariot of Jagannath for the rath yatra, after which the procession begins. The rath yatra entourage passes through different parts of the city of Ahmedabad covering a distance of about 14-km. The yatra halts at Saraspur, where the locals offer 'Maha Bhoj' to the entire entourage of devotees of Lord Jagannath. It is celebrated as 'Lokotsav' or public festival of the state of Gujarat. The Ahmedabad Rath Yatra is known to be the third largest Rath Yatra festival after the Rath Yatra festivals in Puri and Kolkata are celebrated on the same day.

== Attack on the temple during the 1969 Gujarat Riots ==
On 18 September 1969, a Muslim crowd gathered in the Jamalpur area to celebrate the local Urs festival at the tomb of a Sufi saint (Bhukhari Saheb's Chilla). When the Sadhus of the nearby Jagannath temple tried to bring their cows back to the temple compound through the crowded streets, some Muslim women were injured. The cows also allegedly damaged some carts on which the Muslims were selling goods. This led to violence in which some Muslim youths attacked and injured the sadhus, and damaged the temple windows. Sevadasji, the mahant (priest) of the Hindu temple, went on a protest fast, which he gave up after a 15-member Muslim delegation led by A.M. Peerzada met him and apologized.

However, subsequently, a dargah (tomb shrine) near the temple was damaged by some Hindus. A large number of Muslims protestors gathered in the area. On the afternoon of 19 September, a crowd of 2500-3000 Muslims attacked the temple again. Following this, the rumors spread and the violence escalated, resulting in several incidents of arson, murders and attacks on the places of worship around the area.

== Connectivity ==
By Road - The city of Ahmedabad is well connected to every major city of Gujarat by roadways. lots of private and public buses ply to the Jagannnath Temple.

By Air - Ahmedabad is connected to all major cities around the globe by airways. Sardar Vallabhbhai Patel international airport, Ahmedabad receive flights from all over the world.

By Train - Ahmedabad city is also connected to the major cities of Gujarat by Railways. Ahmedabad railway station receive trains from many cities. There is a train to Jagannnath temple from Ahmedabad.

== See also ==
- List of Jagannath Temples outside Puri
- Swaminarayan Temple, Ahmedabad
- Jagannath Temple, Puri
