= Guptipara Rathayatra =

Chariot festival since 1740 in Guptipara, Hooghly

Rathayatra of Guptipara
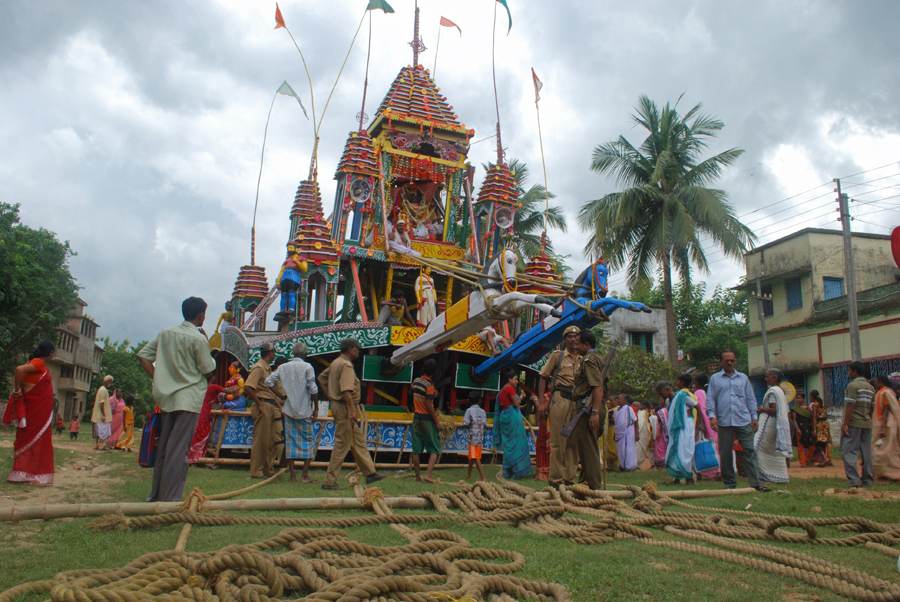
- Rath (Chariot) of Guptipara on the day of Ultorath
- Founded: 1740
- Founded By: Swami Madhusudananda
- Place: Guptipara, Hooghly District, West Bengal, India
- Organizer: Shree Shree Brindavan Chandra Jiu Math
- Height: 36 feet
- Base: 34 feet X 34 feet
- Wheels: 16
- Style: Nabaratna

Guptipara Rathayatra has been celebrated in Guptipara in Hooghly District of West Bengal since the 1730s. The chariot is a nabaratna-style wooden temple, where the presiding deity in the chariot is that of Brindaban Chandra jiu. The Guptipara Rathayatra is second only to the Puri Rathayatra in terms of the distance covered. One of the unique events of Guptipara Rathayatra is the bhandara loot, which is held a day before the purnayatra or the ulto rath. A month long fair is held in Guptipara on the occasion of the festival. Every year thousands of devotees take part in the festival.

== History ==
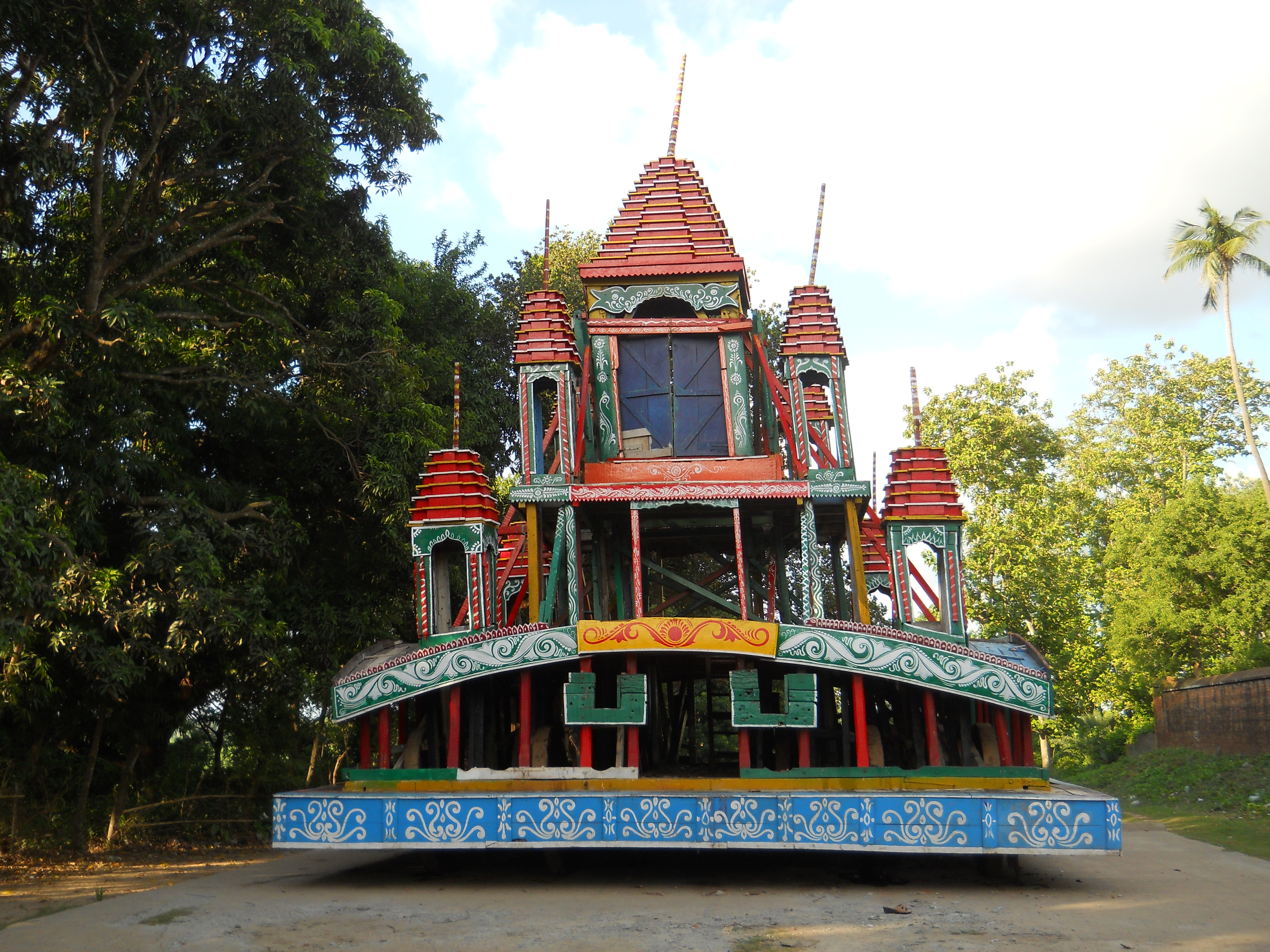
Chariot of Guptipara

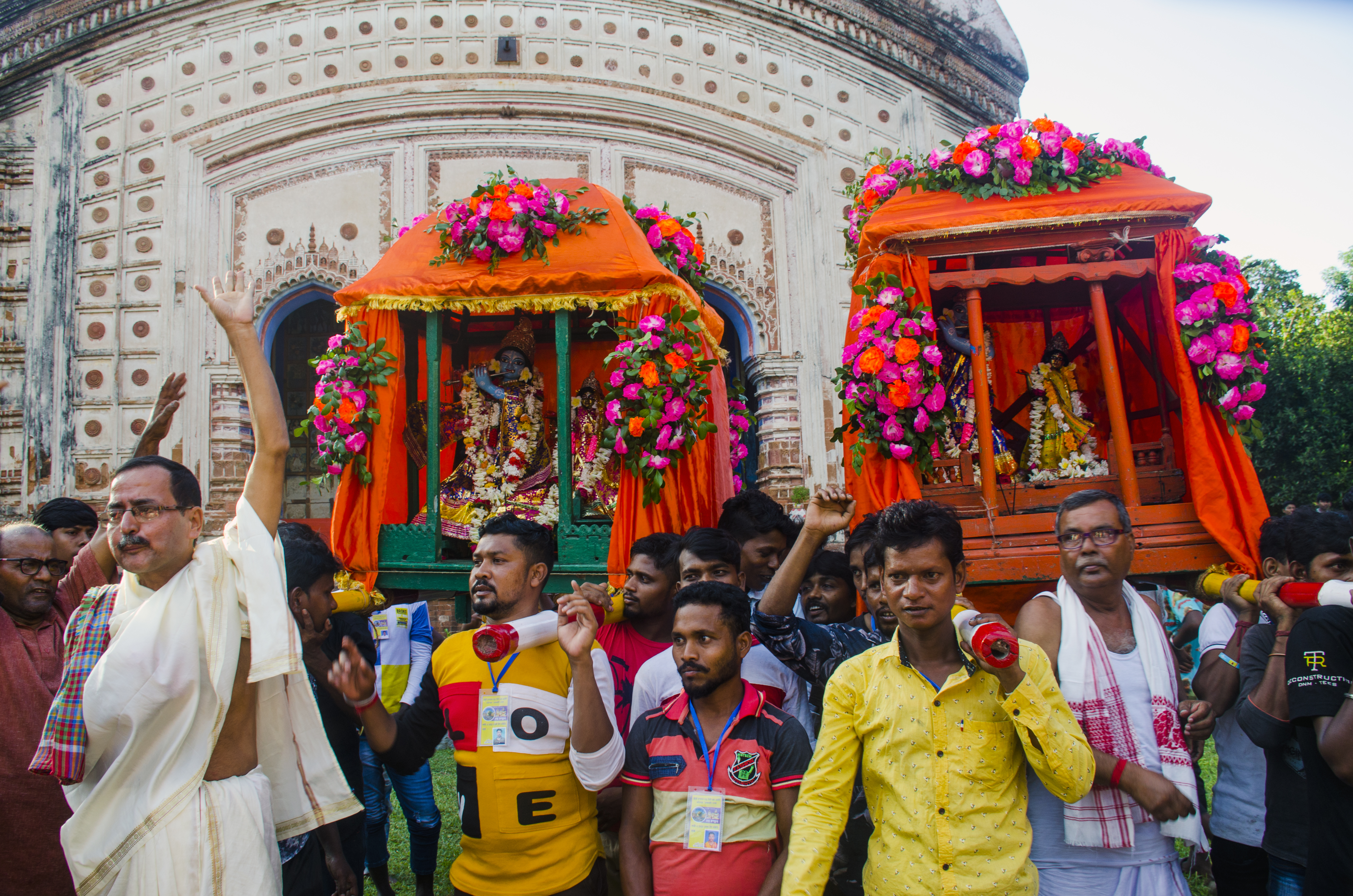
Idols of Brindaban Chandra and Krishna Chandra being carried in decorative palanquins

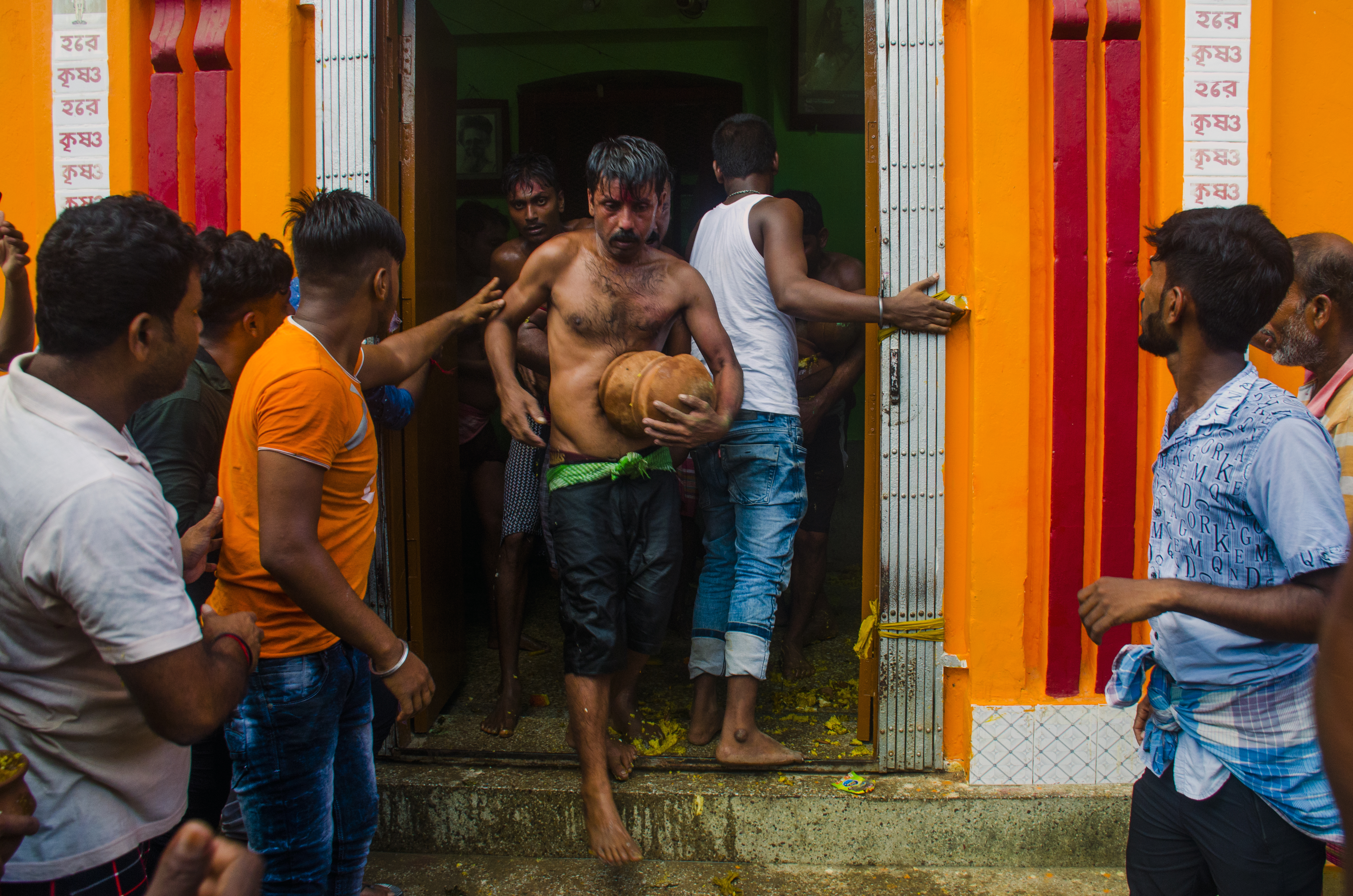
Devotees come out temple with the loot

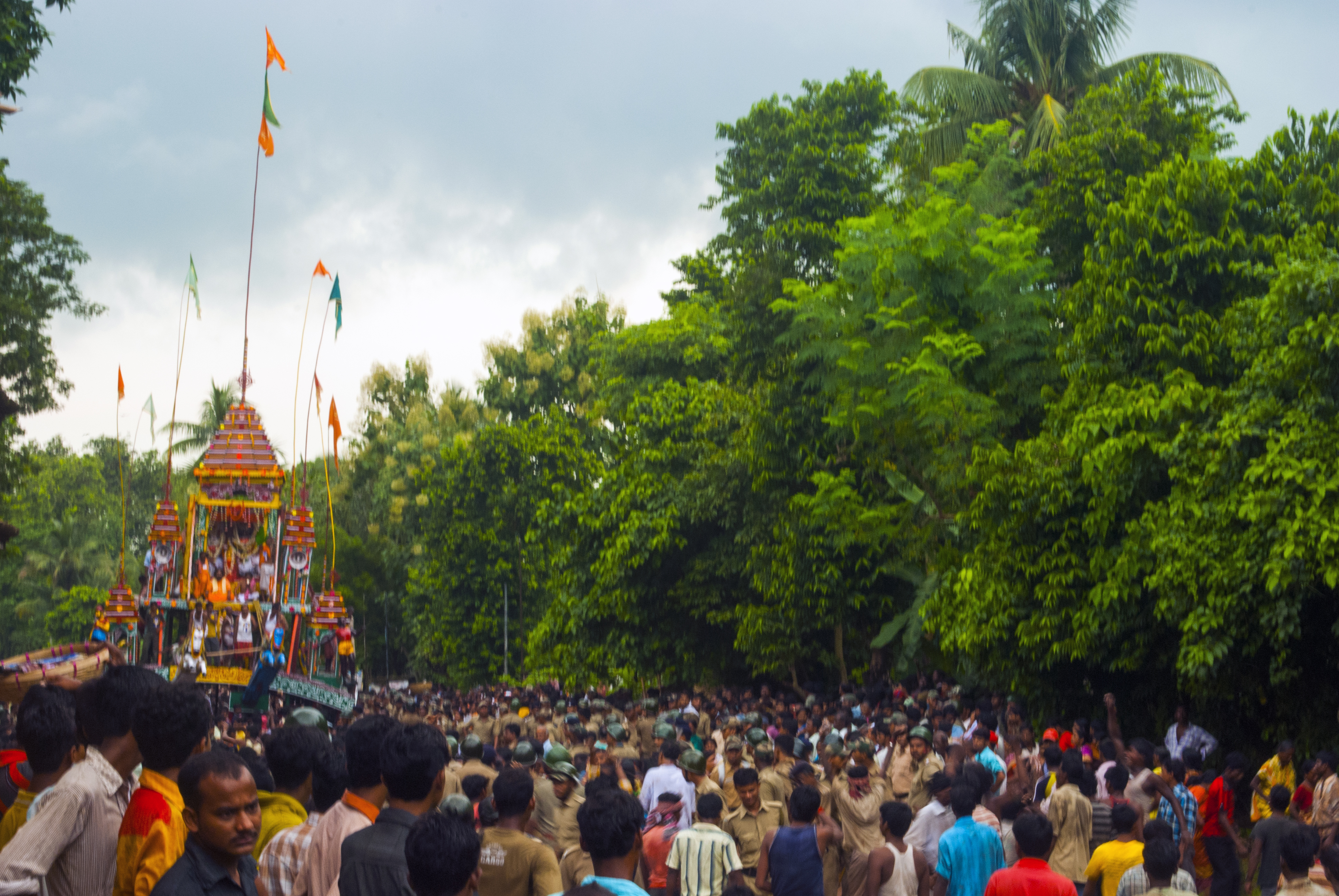
Pulling of the chariot during ultorath

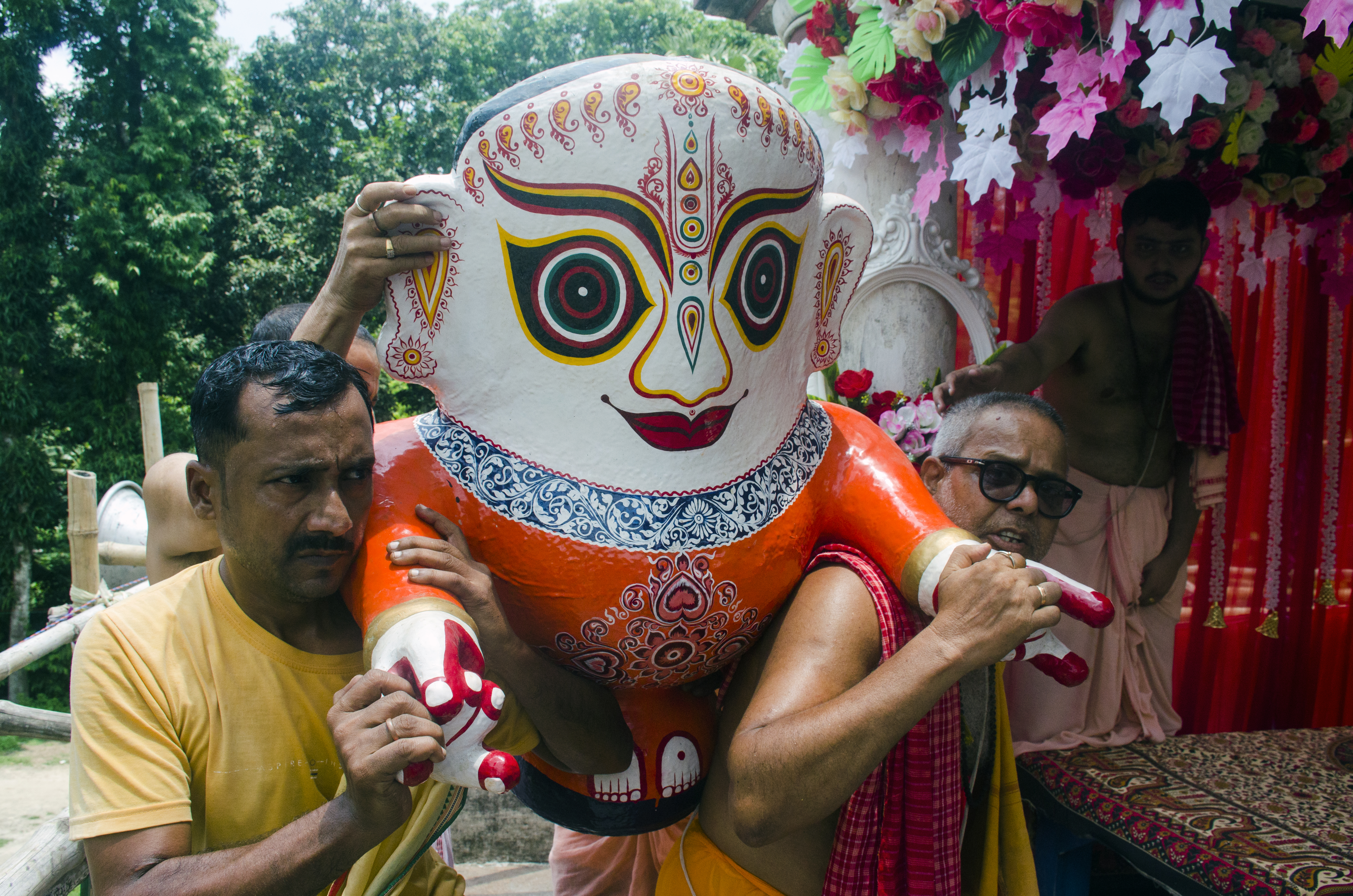
Idol of Balaram is being brought to the Snan Mancha

The year when the rathayatra started is not clear. According to some sources, the rathayatra is more than 400 years old. According to other sources, the rathayatra started somewhere between 1735 and 1740. According to another source Swami Madhusudanananda of Shree Shree Vrindavan Chandra Jiu Math started the rathayatra in the year 1740. In 1858, one lakh devotees participated in the bhandara loot, according to Swami Govindananda Puri of Shree Shree Vrindavan Chandra Jiu Math. In 1873, Swami Prithananda, the dandiswami of Shree Shree Vrindavana Chandra Jiu was run over during the rathyatra in an accident. Following that incident, the number of shikharas of the ratha was reduced from thirteen to nine. Every year devotees from the districts of Burdwan, Nadia, Howrah and North 24 Parganas visit Guptipara to see the rathayatra.

== Chariot ==
The present ratha or the chariot is a wooden Nabaratna temple having nine shikharas. The framework of the ratha is made of Shorea robusta hardwood. The ratha has a square base measuring 34 feet by 34 feet. It is four storied, having a height of 36 feet. The ratha is fitted with 16 wheels made from Vachellia nilotica hardwood. It has four ropes in the front, each 300 feet long which are used for pulling the ratha forward. There is one more rope at the back which acts as a brake. One of the front ropes is reserved for women.

The present ratha is the same chariot that was being used in the first year of the rathayatra. It is nearly 280 years old. During the entire year the ratha is kept inside a giant metallic cage. Weeks before the festival it is brought out and prepared for the festival. As of 2012, the chariot was in a dilapidated condition. The Guptipara Shree Shree Vrindavan Chandra Jiu Math have been providing patch work to the current structure every year as a stop gap solution. They have approached the district administration and the Archaeological Survey of India for repair.

== Procession ==
The procession starts from Guptipara Shree Shree Vrindavan Chandra Jiu Math and proceeds towards Gundicha house in Gosainganj Barabazar, about 1.5 km away. The distance covered is said to be the second longest among the rathayatras held in India.

== Bhandara loot ==
The mbhandara loot event is held on the day before the mpurnayatra or the ulto rath. According to Binay Ghosh, this event is a folk event and has nothing to do with the scriptures. On that day the worship of the deity is held behind closed doors at mashir bari or Jagannath's aunt's place. After the worship, huge quantities of prasada is offered to the deity. The prasada consists of khichuri made of Gobindo bhog rice, labra a mixed vegetable dish, a paneer dish, brinjal and pumpkin fries, payesh, malpoa, khir, chhana, other sweets and fruits. The mprasada is kept in more than 400 malsas or earthen bowls in an adjacent store room. Each malsa contains nearly five kilograms of prasada. The devotees begin to gather outside the store room from mid day. According to Binay Ghosh, the majority of the devotees in these event are the local Gops, some of whom rehearse for the event from the morning. The priest opens all the three door of the store room at 5 pm and the devotees rush inside the store to loot the prasada. Many of the locals do not cook at home that night and even on the following day.

== See also ==
- Mahesh Rathayatra
- Dhamrai Rathayatra
