= Rath Yatra (Ahmedabad) =

Hindu festival organised in Ahemdabad, Gujarat

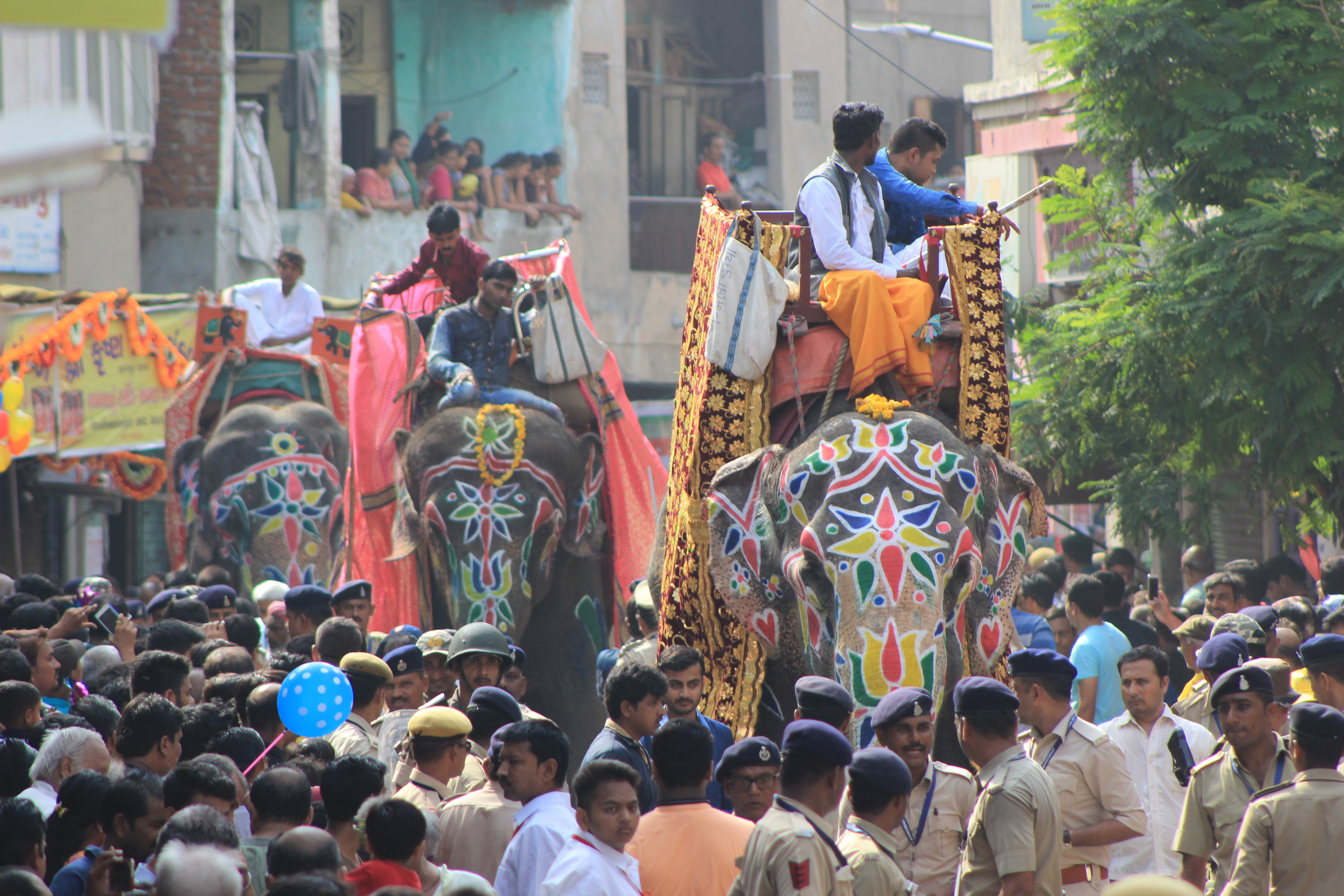
Decorated Elephants in Rath Yatra, Ahmedabad

Rath Yatra (transl. Chariot Festival or Car Festival) is a Hindu festival celebrated annually in Ahmedabad. Since 1878, the Jagannath Temple, Ahmedabad has organised the Rath Yatra procession on Asadh Sud Bij. This festival celebrates the deities Jagannath, Balrama and Subhdra.

Held as a Lokotsav (public festival) of Gujarat, the Ahmedabad Rath Yatra is the third largest in India, following the Rath Yatras in Puri and Kolkata, which are also celebrated on the same day.

During the 2023 Rath Yatra procession in Ahmedabad on June 20, a balcony collapse on the route in Dariyapur locality tragically resulted in one fatality and eight injuries.

== Legend ==
According to tradition, Narsimhadas, a saintly figure, dreamt of Lord Jagannath, which is believed to have inspired the commencement of the Rath Yatra festival at the Jagannath Temple in Ahmedabad in 1878.

== Traditions ==
Traditionally, the Rath Yatra procession features chariots (known as raths) constructed from coconut wood by devotees from the Khalas community of Bharuch. Members of this community continue to serve as the chariot drivers in the procession.

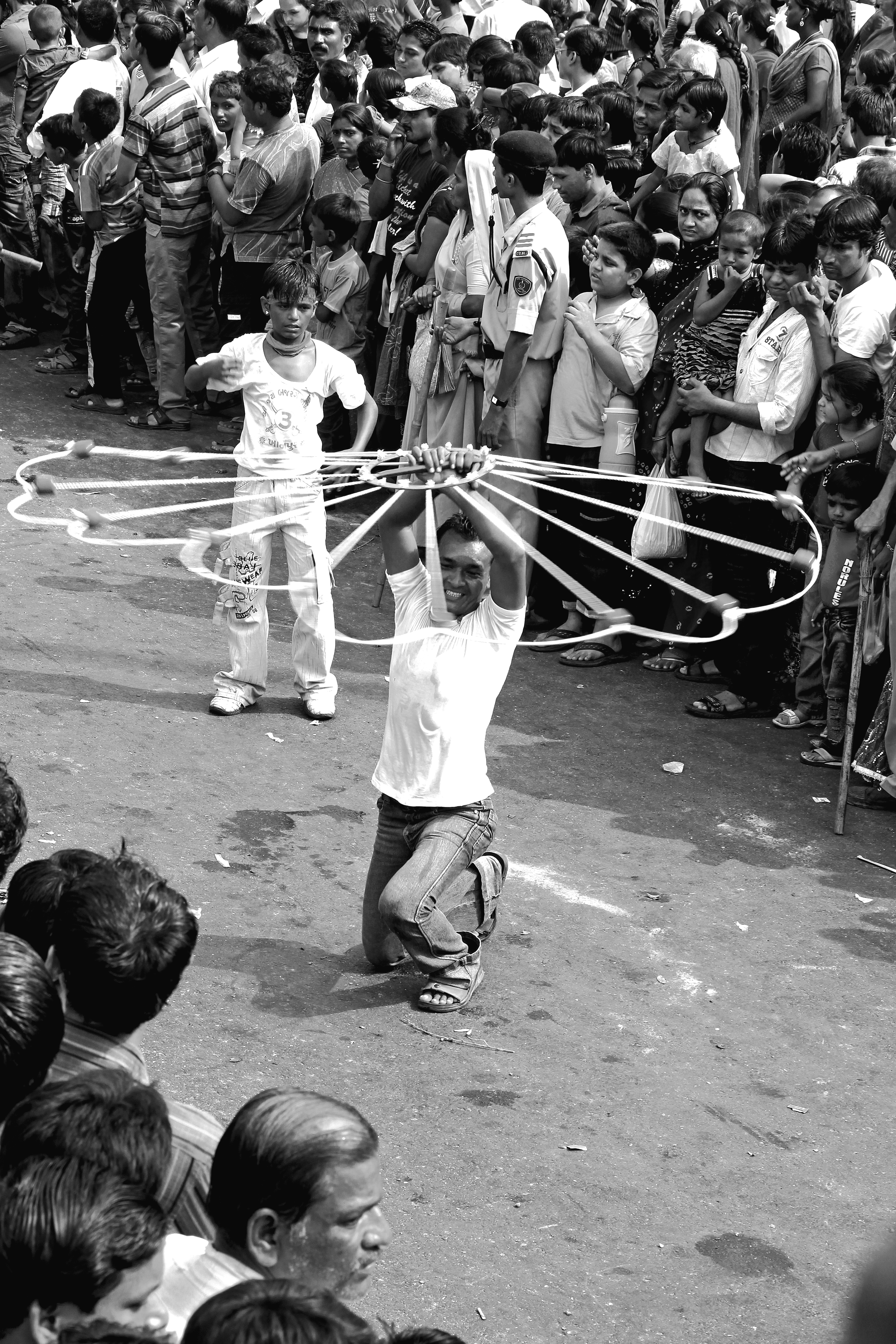
Artist performing his work during Rath Yatra, Ahmedabad (2011).

=== Jalayatra ===
Jalayatra have been carried out on Jayestha Shukla Purnima when Jagannath, Balrama and Subhdra symbolically go to the maternal uncle's home at Saraspur. Darshana in temple closed that day. Jalayatra of Jagannath to Sabarmati river come with a procession and perform the Ganga Poojan, returning with vessels of water for the Abhisheka to Jagannath. After performing the Shodashopchar Poojan Vidhi by chanting the vedic mantras, symbolically the Lord is sent to His maternal uncle’s home.

=== Netrotsav ===
Before two days prior to Rath Yatra, Netrotsav ritual on idols is conducted. According to belief, the eyes of the three deities are affected with conjunctivitis, owing to eating of Jambu or Jamun (Indian blackberry) and Baur (plum) in excess at Mosal. Hence, idols are symbolically treated for it during Netrotsav pujan by covering eyes with clothes.

=== Rath Yatra ===
Mangla Aarti is performed on the day at 4 am and usually Rath Yatra is carried out at 7 am. Pahind Vidhi ritual is performed by the Chief Minister of Gujarat, in which a symbolic cleaning of the path of the Rath Yatra is carried out before the chariot procession begins. During the 149th edition of the procession on 16 July 2026, Chief Minister Bhupendra Patel performed this ritual to flag off the chariots. In the Rath Yatra, Lord Jagannath's chariot is carried out first, followed by Subhadra and Balram's chariot. Akharas, elephants, decorated trucks and troupes also take part in the 14 kilometer long Rath Yatra.
