= Dhamrai Rathayatra =

Hindu temple in Bangladesh

Coordinates: 25°55′06″N 90°12′41″E

Rathayatra of Dhamrai
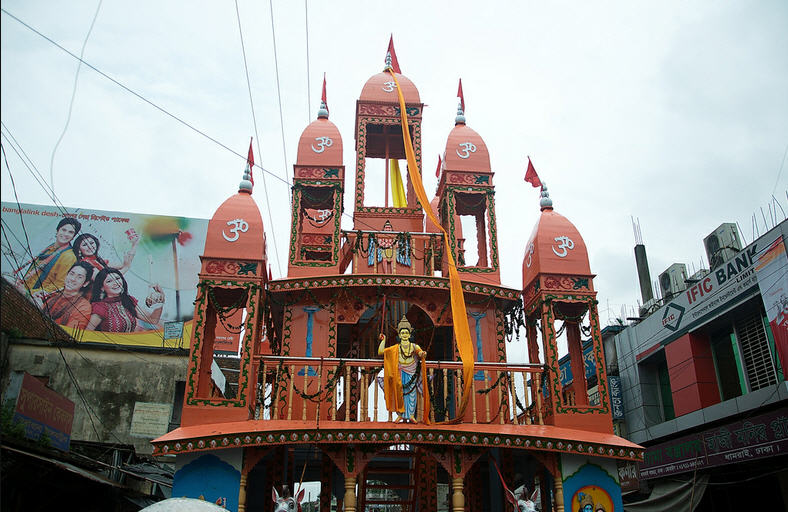
- Founded: 1672
- Place: Dhamrai, Dhaka District, Bangladesh
- Base: 27 ft. by 27 ft.
- Wheels: 15
- Style: Three storied
- Patron: Bina Sikri; Rajib Saha

Dhamrai Jagannath Roth (Bengali: ধামরাই জগন্নাথ রথ) is a chariot temple or Ratha Yatra, a Roth, to the Hindu god Jagannath in Dhamrai, Bangladesh. The annual Jagannath Roth Jatra is a Hindu festival attracting thousands of people. The Roth Jatra in Dhamrai is one of the most important events for the Hindu community of Bangladesh..

It was burnt down by the Pakistan Army in the Bangladesh Liberation War of 1971.

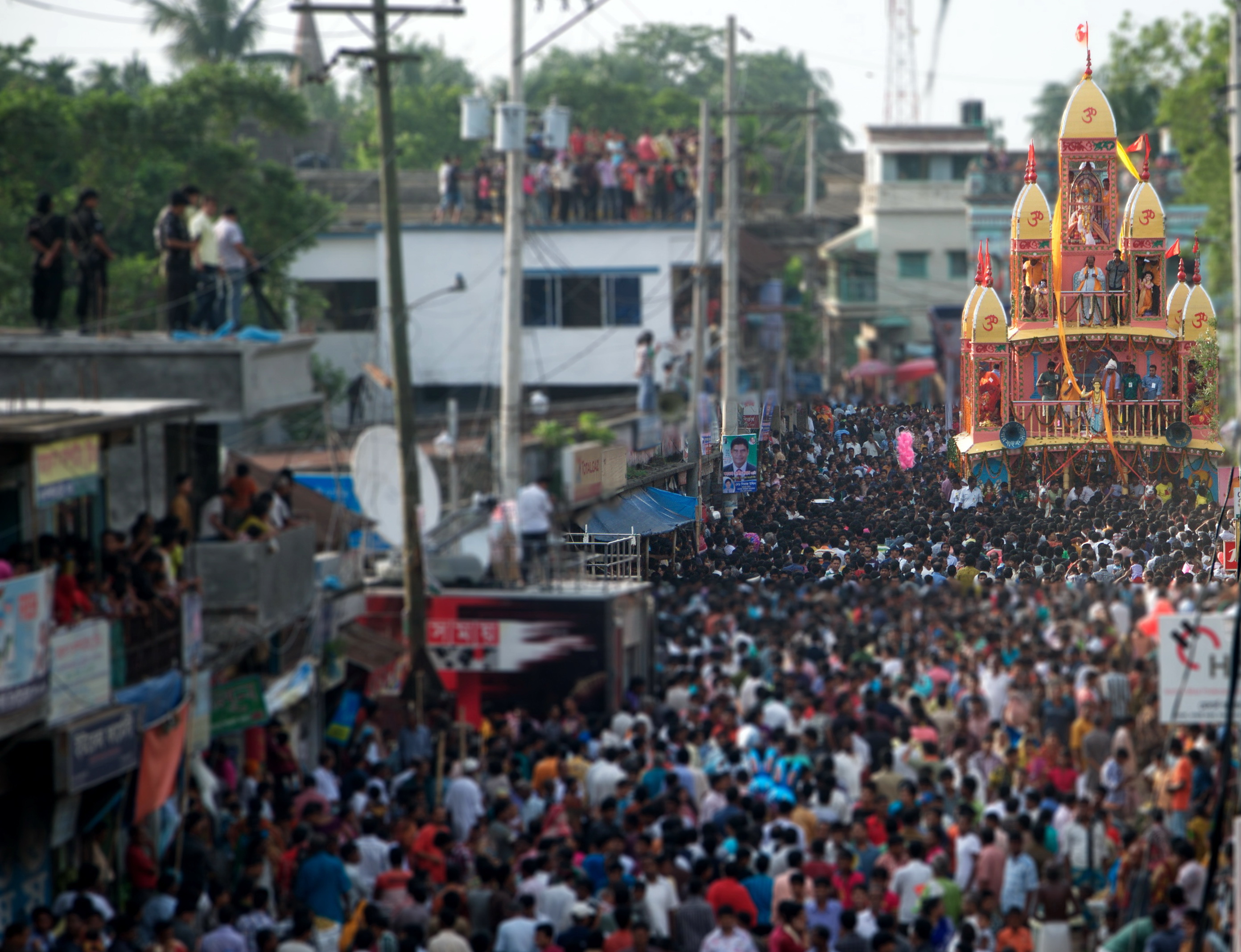
Dhamrai Roth - the journey begins

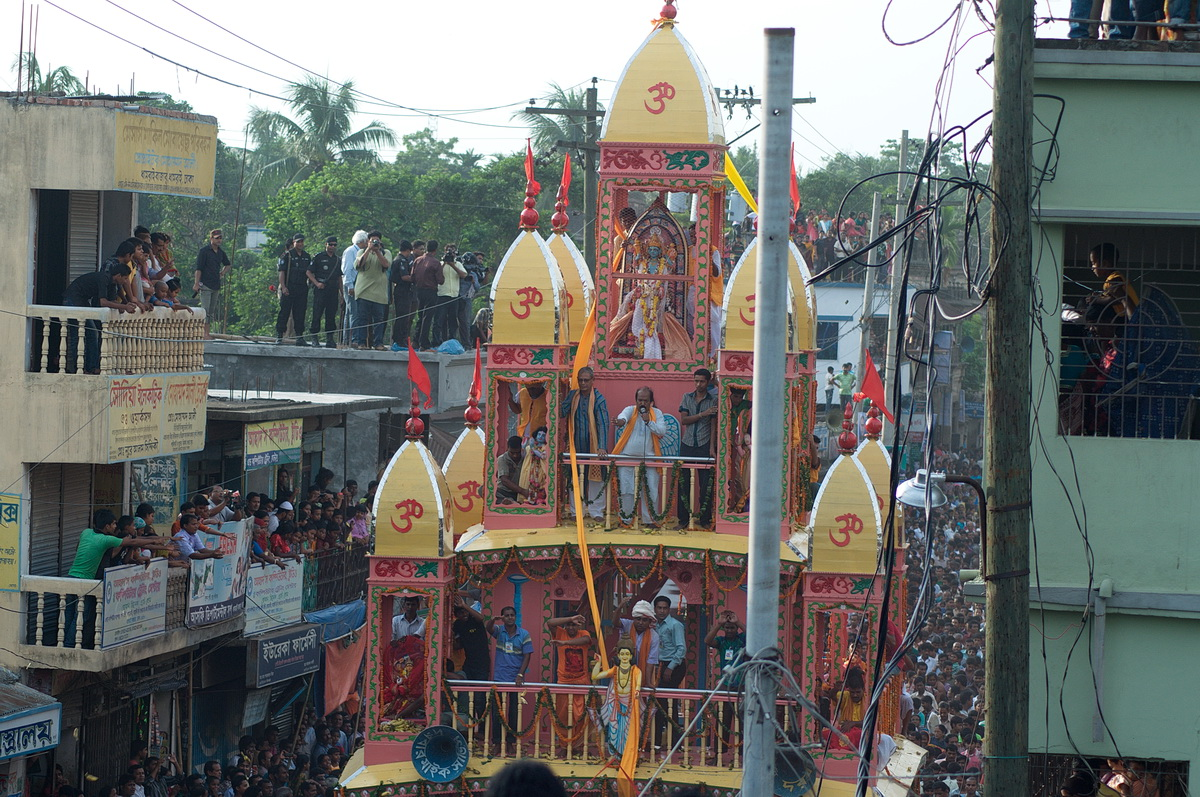
Roth Procession

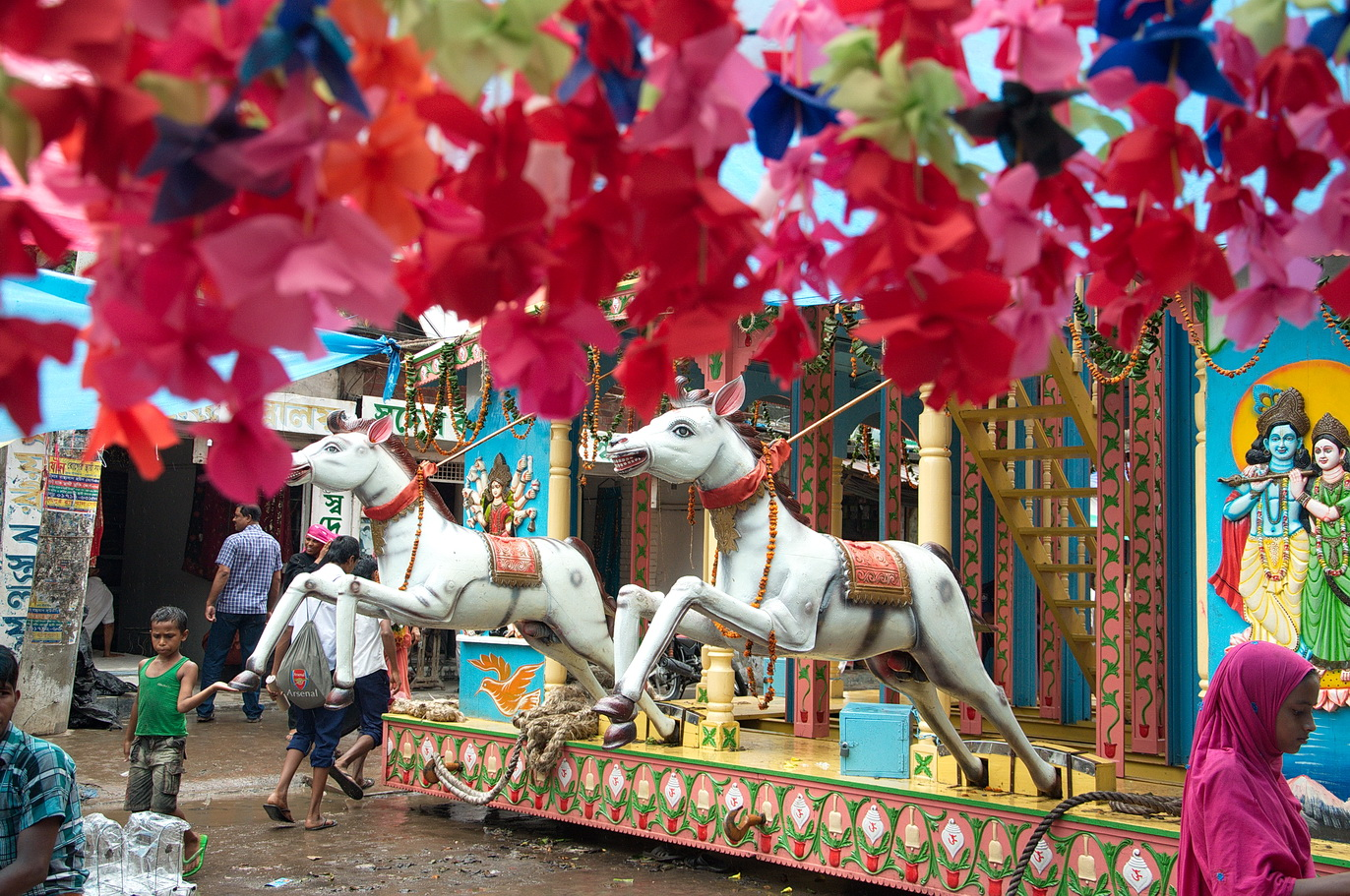
Roth - Front Face
