= Gundicha Temple =

Hindu temple in Puri, Odisha, India

- ଗୁଣ୍ଡିଚା ମନ୍ଦିର
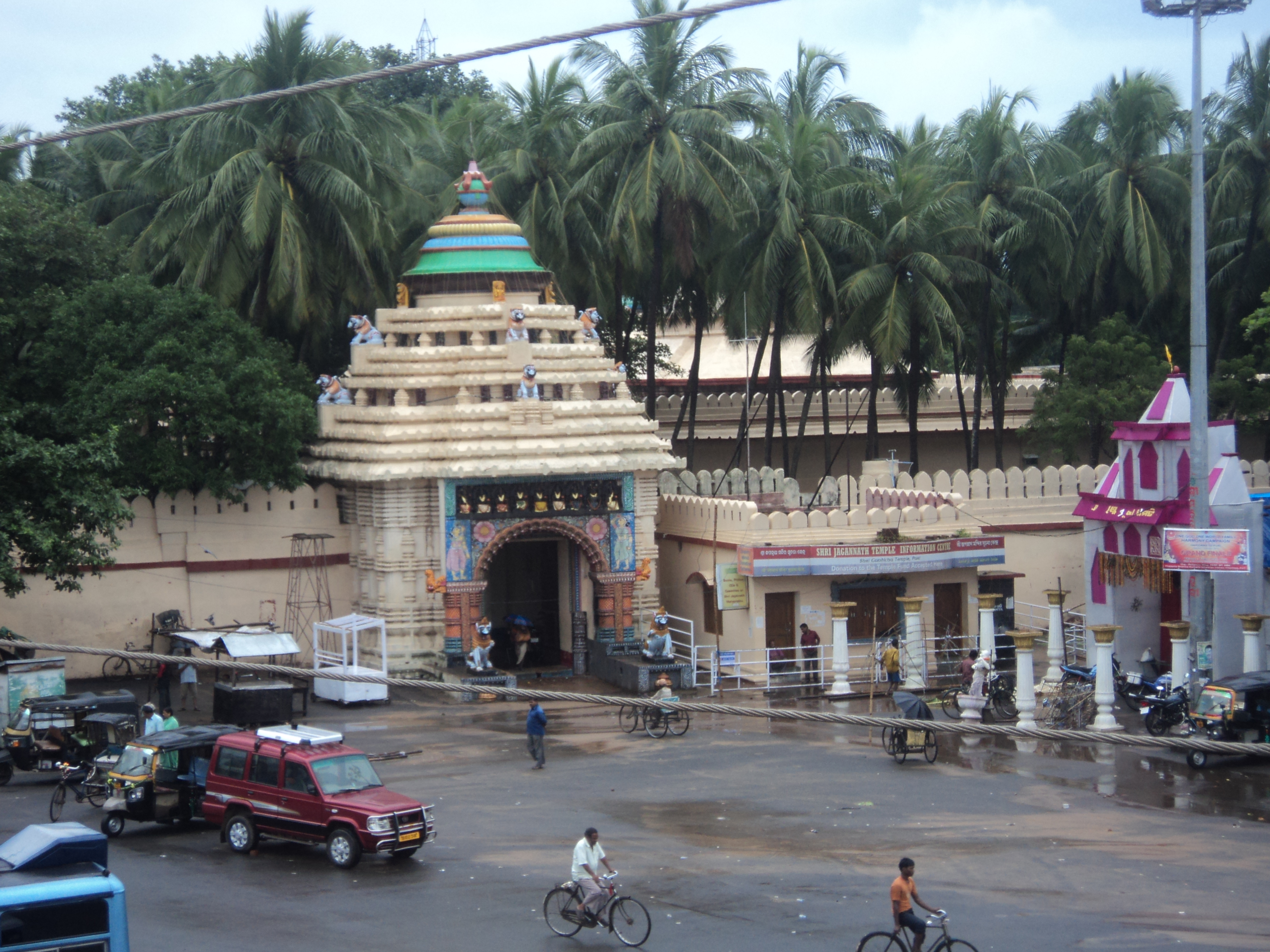
- Gundicha Temple

- Gundicha Temple

Religion
- Affiliation: Hinduism
- District: Puri
- Deity: Jagannath
- Festival: Rath Yatra
- Governing body: Shri Jagannath Temple Administration, Puri

Location
- Location: Badashankha
- State: Odisha
- Country: India
- Coordinates: 19°49′00.9″N 85°50′25.3″E

Architecture
- Temple: One

Website
- www.jagannath.nic.in

Gundicha Temple (Odia: ଗୁଣ୍ଡିଚା ମନ୍ଦିର), is a Hindu temple, situated in the temple town of Puri in the state of Odisha, India. It is significant for being the destination of the celebrated annual Rath Yatra of Puri. While it remains vacant most of the year, the temple is occupied by images of the deities of Jagannath, his brother Balabhadra and sister Subhadra for seven complete days (total 9 days including the start and concluding day of Ratha Yatra) every year during the annual Rath Yatra festival.

== Temple ==
Known as the Garden House of Jagannath, the Gundicha temple stands in the centre of a beautiful garden, surrounded by compound walls on all sides. It lies at a distance of about 3 kilometres (1.9 mi) from the Shrimandira, the main temple of Jagannath. The two temples are located at the two ends of the Bada Danda (Grand Avenue) which is the pathway for the Rath Yatra.

The temple is built using light-grey sandstone and architecturally, it exemplifies typical Kalinga temple architecture in the Deula style. The complex comprises four components: vimana (tower structure containing the sanctum), jagamohana (assembly hall), nata-mandapa (festival hall) and bhoga-mandapa (hall of offerings). There is also a kitchen connected by a small passage. The temple is set within a garden, and is known as "God's Summer Garden Retreat" or garden house of Jagannath. The entire complex, including garden, is surrounded by a wall.

The sanctum features a plain raised platform (4 feet (1.2 m) high and 19 feet (5.8 m) long) made of chlorite called Ratnavedi, where the deities are placed during the annual festivities. The temple has two gates. The western gate is the main temple gate, through which the deities enter the temple during Ratha Yatra. The eastern gate, known as Nakachana gate, is used for the departure of the deities.

Except for the 9-day Rath Yatra when Jagannath is worshipped in Gundicha temple, the temple remains empty the rest of the year. Tourists don't have to pay any fee to enter the temple, it's considered that Lord Jagannath ensures all of his devotees equally. There is no rich or poor inside the temple.All have to follow the same rule either it be a common man or a president. Foreigners (prohibited entry in the main temple) are allowed inside this temple during this period. The temple is under the Jagannath Temple Administration, Puri - the governing body of the main temple. A small band of servitors maintain the temple.

== The Rath Yatra ==
The Rath Yatra starts on the second lunar day (dwitiya) the bright fortnight (shukla paksha) of the Hindu month of Ashadha. One day before the Ratha Yatra, the Gundicha Temple is religiously cleansed for housing the gods.

On the first day of the yatra, the deities are transported in chariots from the main temple to Gundicha temple. This is the famous Rath Yatra or Chariot Festival of Jagannath Puri. The three deities are transported in three magnificent chariots, drawn by the numerous devotees gathered there. The three chariots involved in the chariot procession are: one for each deity with central chariot called the Nandighosha, carrying the main deity of Jagannath and the second chariot known as Taladhwaja carrying Balabhadra, and the third chariot called the Darpadalana carrying Subhadra. The procession progresses down the 3 km long "Bada Danda" (long avenue) and reaches the gates of the Gundicha temple before nightfall. The deities remain in the chariots on the first day and enter the Gundicha Temple on the second day. They reside at the Gundicha temple for the subsequent seven days.

== Ratha Yatra rituals ==
Worship

A particular feature in the worship of the deities at Gundicha Temple is that Brahmin temple servants offer the puja instead of daitas, the traditional non-Brahmin servitors of Jagannath who are excluded from worship. Though devadasis generally function as agents of Lakshmi, they offer worship in the Gundicha Temple in the same manner as in the main temple, while Lakshmi is left behind in a storeroom in the main temple. This connotes a different context to the role of the devadasis in the Gundicha Temple. Another unusual feature is that the images are smeared with larger quantities of sandalwood paste, twice a day, as a "cooling agent" (as is commonly done to the goddess Gundicha). Every day of their stay in the temple, the deities are decorated with new dresses.

Hera Panchami

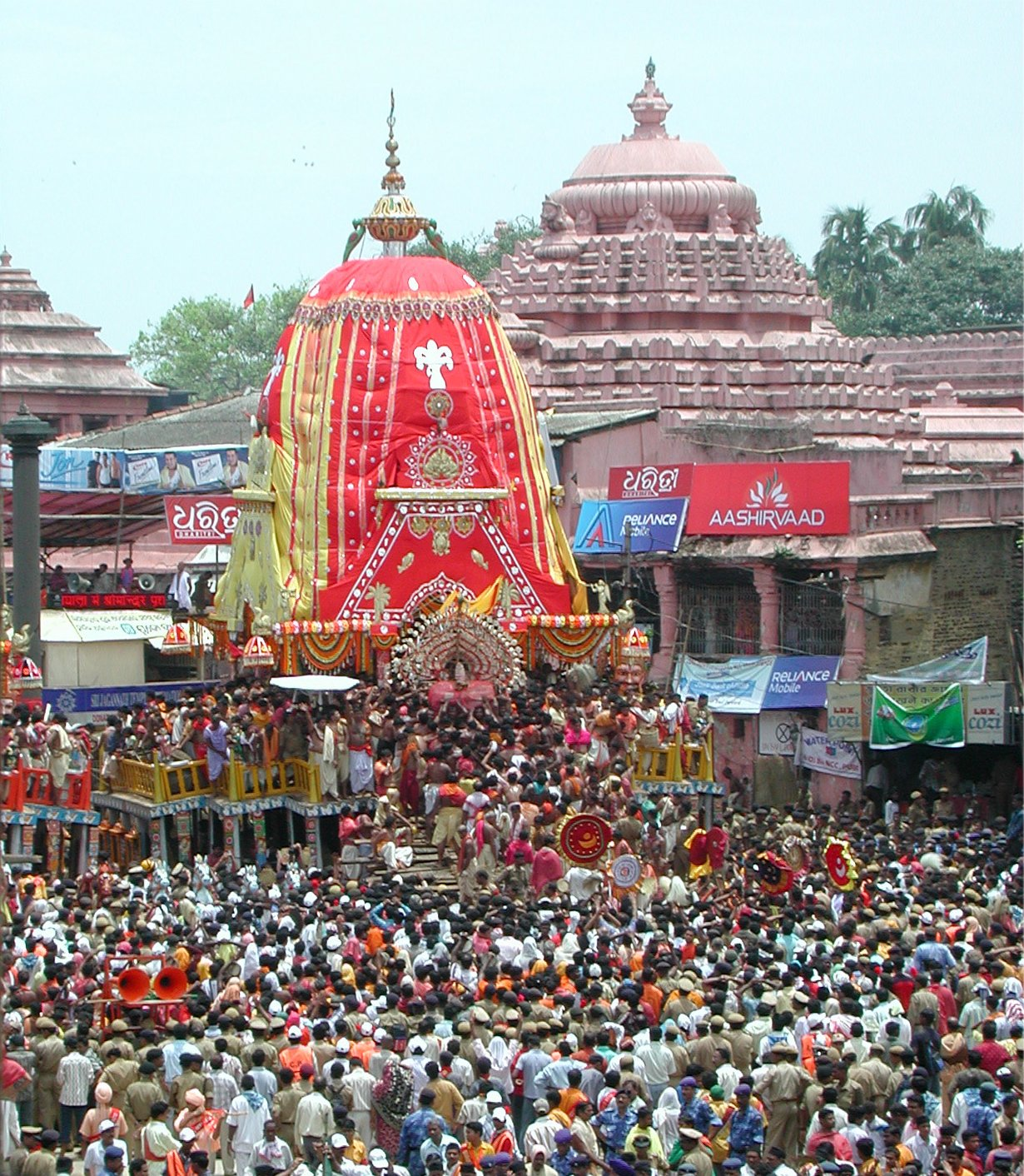
Nandighosha, the Chariot of Jagannath leaves the main temple.

A major ceremony celebrated in the Gundicha Temple during the Rath Yatra is on the Panchami (5th day of the Ratha Yatra) known as Hera Panchami (Hera means "to see"). This ceremony is attended by a very large number of devotees, who visit the Ratha Yatra Festival. While Jagannath visits Gundicha temple, his wife Lakshmi is left behind in the main temple of Puri. On Hera Panchami, the furious goddess Lakshmi arrives, in the form of the image of Subarna Mahalakshmi, at the Gundicha Temple. She is formally carried in a palanquin with much fan fare and welcomed and worshipped by the priests of Gundicha Temple, who take her to the sanctum to meet Jagannath. The husband and wife seat face-to-face on the porch in the sanctum of the Gundicha Temple; on this occasion devotees flock to the temple to have the darshan (see the holy images). Lakshmi requests him to return home and Jagannath gives his consent by offering her agyan mala (a garland of consent), which the goddess accepts and takes with her while return to the main temple in the evening. Before returning to the temple, to vent her anger at being left out of the vacation, Lakshmi orders one of her attendants to damage a part of Jagannath's chariot, the Nandighosha. This ritual is known as the Ratha Bhanga (the breaking of the chariot). This is followed by her hiding behind a tamarind tree outside the Gundicha Temple. After some time, she escapes to her home temple in secrecy, through a separate path way known as Hera Gohri Lane, as she fears the repercussions of her angry act.

Dakshina Moda

The ceremony of Dakshina Moda (turning south) is observed on the day after Hera Panchami, that is, the sixth day of the Rath Yatra. The chariots of the deities are parked outside the temple, facing the main temple gate (western gate). In preparation for the return journey, the Bahuda Yatra, the chariots are turned to face towards the main temple in the southern direction and are parked near the Nakachana gate (eastern gate) of the Gundicha Temple through which the deities leave the temple. It is said that the demon-king of Lanka, Vibhishana got darshan of Jagannath from far away Lanka on this day. Devotees believe one can attain salvation by witnessing this ceremony.

Rasa Lila

Dakshina Moda, marks the beginning of the three-day Rasa Lila of Jagannath. Rasa lila is described in Hindu texts like the Bhagavata Purana and Gita Govinda as a night in Vrindavan when Krishna danced with his gopi-consort Radha and other gopis. The image of Jagannath is taken to the Rasa mandapa (a temple hall) of the Gundicha Temple where hymns from the Gita Govinda are sung for the last 3 days of his stay in the temple. During the Rasa Lila, the interaction between Jagannath-Krishna and the gopis is enacted through the Gita Govinda verses. In the olden days, Devadasis sang the verses, which are now sung by the temple servitors. Vaishnavas thus consider Gundicha Temple as Vrindavan during Jagannath's stay there.

Sandhya Darshan and Mahaprasad

As per tradition, during Jagannath's stay in Gundicha temple, the kitchens of the main temple stop preparing Mahaprasad (food offered to deity and given to a devotee as the deity's blessing). The Mahaprasad consists of rice, dal, vegetables etc. The kitchens of the Gundicha temple are repaired and food is cooked there to offer to Jagannath. The day of Sandhya Darshan, (evening prayers) the second last day of the festival, is considered the most important day to have darshan of Jagannath. On this day, as thousands of devotees throng the temple to have darshan of Jagannath and partake of Mahaprasad.

Bahuda Yatra

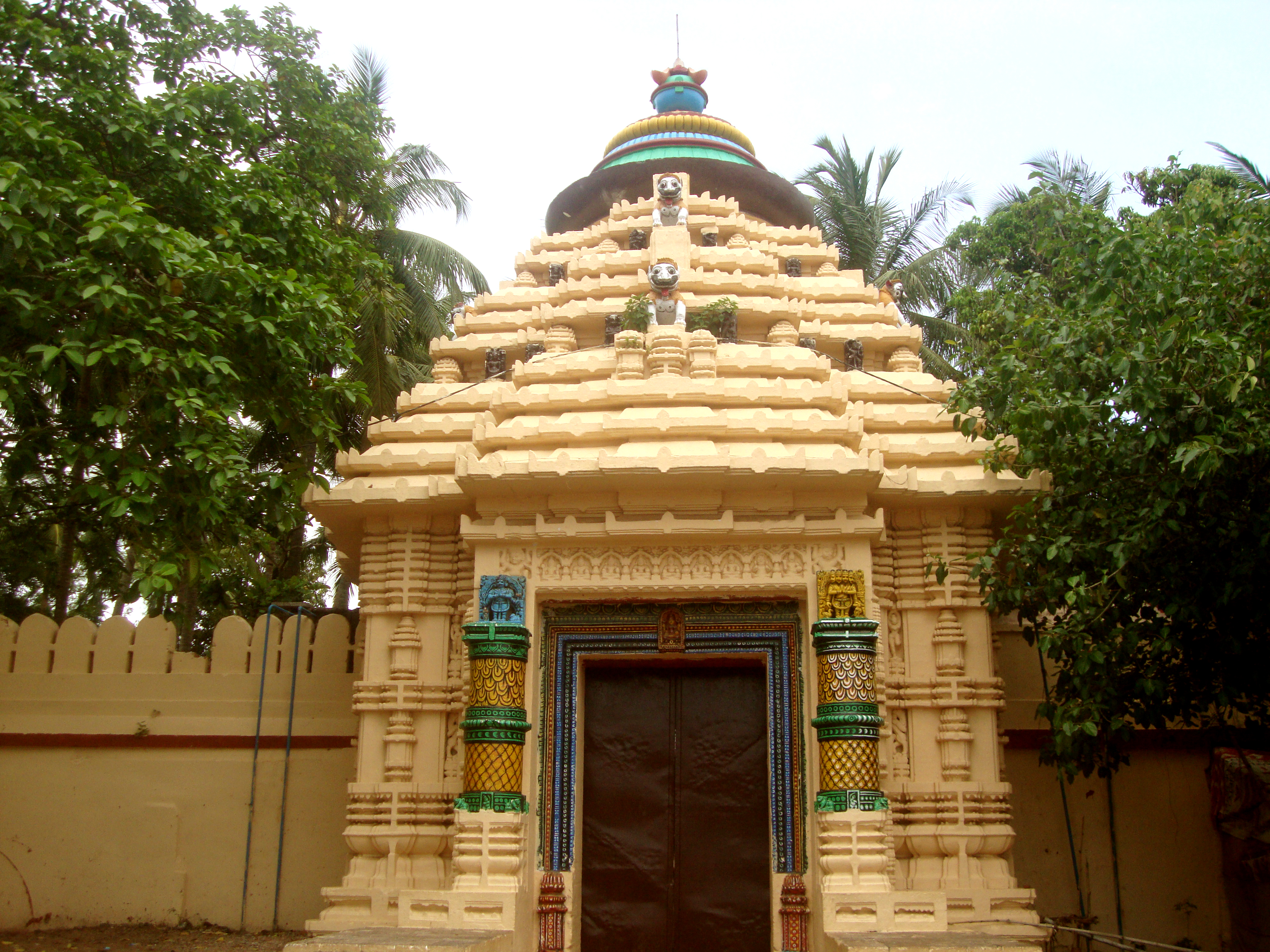
The Nakachana Gate of the Gundicha Temple

The return journey of Jagannath, Balabhadra and Subhadra to the main temple, after spending seven days in the Gundicha temple, is known as the Bahuda Yatra. The images of the deities are brought out of the Gundicha temple through the Nakachana Gate during the Pahandi ceremony, to the accompaniment of the beats of cymbals and gongs and the sound of conches being blown. Odissi and Gotipua dancers serenade to the tune of music in front of the chariots, and martial artists perform banati, a traditional martial art in front of the deities. The deities are taken in the same chariots in which they arrive, pulled by devotees back to the main temple. It is considered auspicious to get a glimpse of the deities on their chariots.

== Legends ==
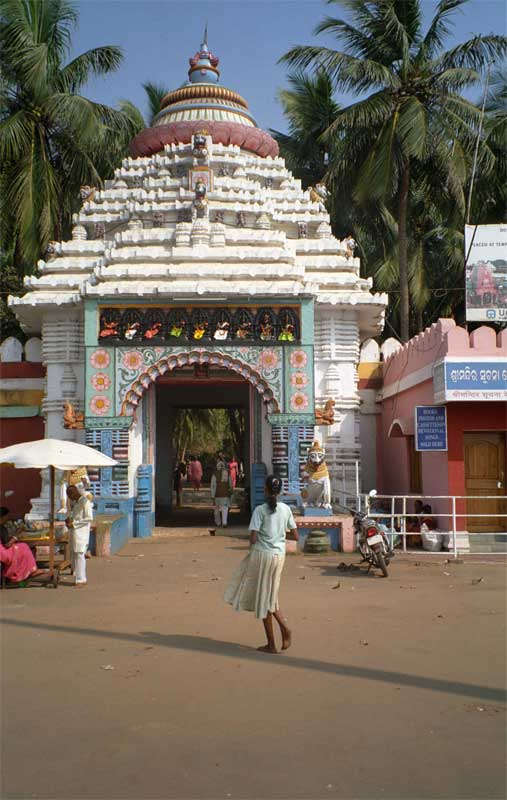
The Main Gate of the Gundicha Temple

There are many legends linked to the temple and the annual seven-day stay of the central icons of Jagannath and his siblings during the Ratha Yatra.

A legend links the temple to Gundicha, the queen of Indradyumna (the legendary builder of the main temple) - after whom the Gundicha Temple is named. Gundicha had a peep at the divine image of Jagannath being created by the celestial architect Vishwakarma. Impressed by the image, she insisted on her husband building the temple for the deity and starting the Ratha Yatra. Another variant suggests that Jagannath was pleased with her temple and promised to visit her house, now the Gundicha Temple.

As per another legend, when Jagannath (identified with the god Krishna) goes to stay for seven days in the Gundicha Temple, he intentionally leaves behind his consort Lakshmi locked up in a store room in the main Jagannath Temple. While in the Gundicha temple, he is exclusively taken care by his gopis (cow-herding girls) led by his gopi-lover Radha like Krishna in Vrindavan. The gopis are symbolized by the temple devadasis on this occasion. When Jagannatha returns to his main temple after his amorous dalliance, Lakshmi meets him at the main temple gate and sprinkles some magical powder on him, which makes him forget about his escapade in the Gundicha Temple, and she is immediately reunited with her husband in blissful love.

One more legend relates the temple's name Gundicha to a local goddess Gundicha, akin to Durga, worshipped to cure smallpox. Gundi in Oriya means smallpox, Gundicha is considered Krishna-Jagannath's aunt, which he visits with his siblings annually.

Another legend is about the mysterious disappearance of Chaitanya Mahaprabhu (an incarnation of Krishna according to the Bhavishya Purana). He established Gaudiya Vaishnavism and also known to have composed the Jagannath Astakam. He lived in Puri for many years and sang bhajans (devotional songs) and led sankirtan processions in front of Jagannath during his Chandan Yatra and Ratha Yatra, along with many devotees. It is also said that Chaitanya Mahaprabhu used to go into a rapturous mood watching the god's love play and dance with joy and also fainted many times due to emotion. Daily, he prayed to Jagannath, standing behind the garudastamba (Pillar of Garuda) with tears flowing down his eyes. With permission of the king, Chaitanya Mahaprabhu once undertook the task of cleaning the Gundicha temple premises a day before the Ratha yatra (this tradition is followed even to this day by the followers of the Gaudiya Vaishnavism). It is mentioned that once Chaitanya Mahaprabhu, unnoticed by his attendants, walked towards the Gundicha Temple and was last seen entering the Manikotha, thereafter he was never seen again. This disappearance has remained an unexplained mystery as none of the books written on him have recorded this event. It is believed that he merged with Jagannath at the temple.

== See also ==
- Jagannath Temple, Puri
- Ratha Yatra (Puri)
- Sevayat
