= Gahana Bije =

Gajapati Queens

Gahana Bije (Odia: ଗହନ ବିଜେ) is a ceremonial visit performed by the Gajapati Queens of Odisha to the Jagannath Temple in Puri, where they do special puja to Lord Jagannatha. This specific cermonial visit is performed only once in a queen's lifetime.

== Ceremony ==
The ceremony includes many restrictions inside the temple. The queen can have darshan of the Lord as much as she can but she can perform ritual only once in her lifetime.

During Gahana Bije, all the aged priests and public should vacate the temple. Only one Brahmin boy and two married Brahmin women should accompany the queen to the garbhagriha.

Then, all other princely states of Odisha are invited to be present in Puri. The queen arrives in a closed palanquin so that nobody can witness her. Processions and martial arts are performed before the palanquin. After coming to temple, all the gates are closed and queen makes special Puja to the sibling deities. Finally she is accompanied by His Highness Gajapati Maharaja to the Royal Palace.

== Previous visits ==
- 2007: Gajapati Shri Dibyasingha Deba, Maharani Leelabati Pattamahadei
- 26 October 1966: Maharani Surjyamani Pattamahadei
- 18 September 1933: Chandramani Pattamahadei
