= Aruna Stambha =

Religious Pillar of Jagannath Temple at Puri, Odisha, India

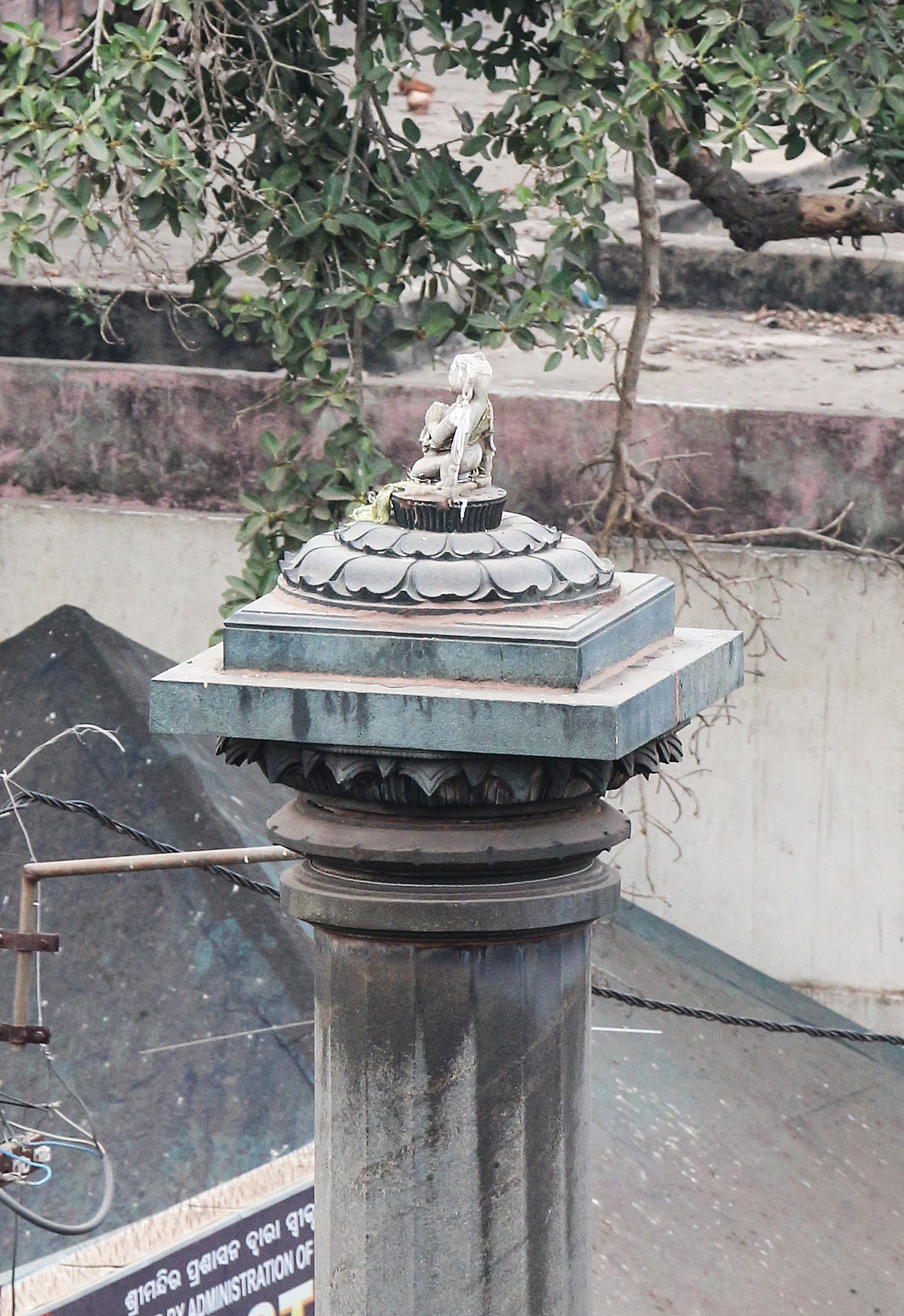
- Statue of Aruna (the charioteer of the Sun) on top of the Aruna Stambha in front of the Singhadwara

Religion
- Affiliation: Hinduism
- Deity: Aruna

Location
- Location: Jagannath Temple, Puri, Odisha
- Interactive map of Aruna Stambha
- Coordinates: 19.8050°N 85.8179°E

Architecture
- Founder: Divyasingha Deva II

Specifications
- Height (max): 34 ft (10 m)
- Materials: Chlorite Stone

Aruna Stambha (Sun Pillar) is a sixteen-sided 34 feet (10 m) tall monolithic chlorite stone Pillar having the idol of Aruna (Charioteer of Sun) on the top. It is about twenty feet (6.1 m) away from the Singhdwara (Lion Gateway) of Jagannath Temple in Puri.

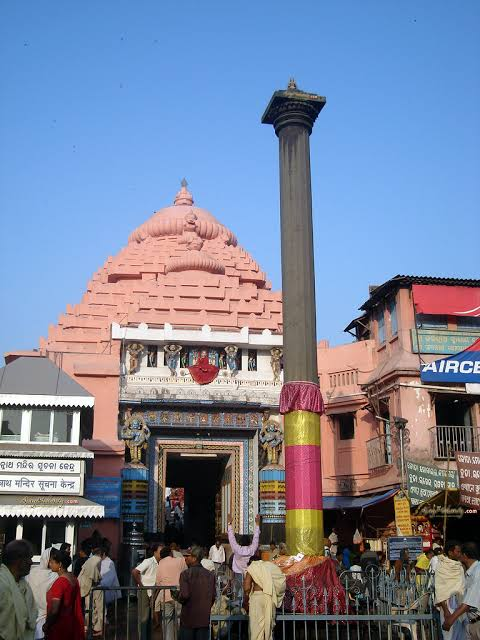
An image of Aruna Stambha in front of the Jagannath Temple

Aruna Stambha is a landmark of Puri. The pilgrims and devotees worship it with reverence. The Stambha has a base carved with military scenes and other figures. Its Capitol is ornamented by a series of lotus petals. The monolithic shafts nearly in circumference is sixteen-sided. Above this are two square slabs surmounted by the idol of Aruna in the act of praying to the god Sun. The column is about 34 feet (10.5 m) in height.

== History ==
According to Madala Panji, Chronicle of Jagannath Temple, mentioned that the Aruna Stambha was brought from the Konark (Sun temple) during the reign of Bhoi king Dibyasingha Deva II by the Maratha guru 'Brahmachari Gosain' and erected here in front of Singhadwara. In 1815 the artists of Colin Mackenzie preparing a sketch of the Pillar at Puri on 26 April. The Pillar seems to have been removed to Puri in the last quarter of the 18th century. From the Vedic times, Surya is taken to be identical with Vishnu. Hence it was quite appropriate to place in front of the temple of Vishnu-Jagannath at Puri.
