= Jagannath Temple, Puri =

Hindu temple at Puri, Odisha, India

Jagannath Temple
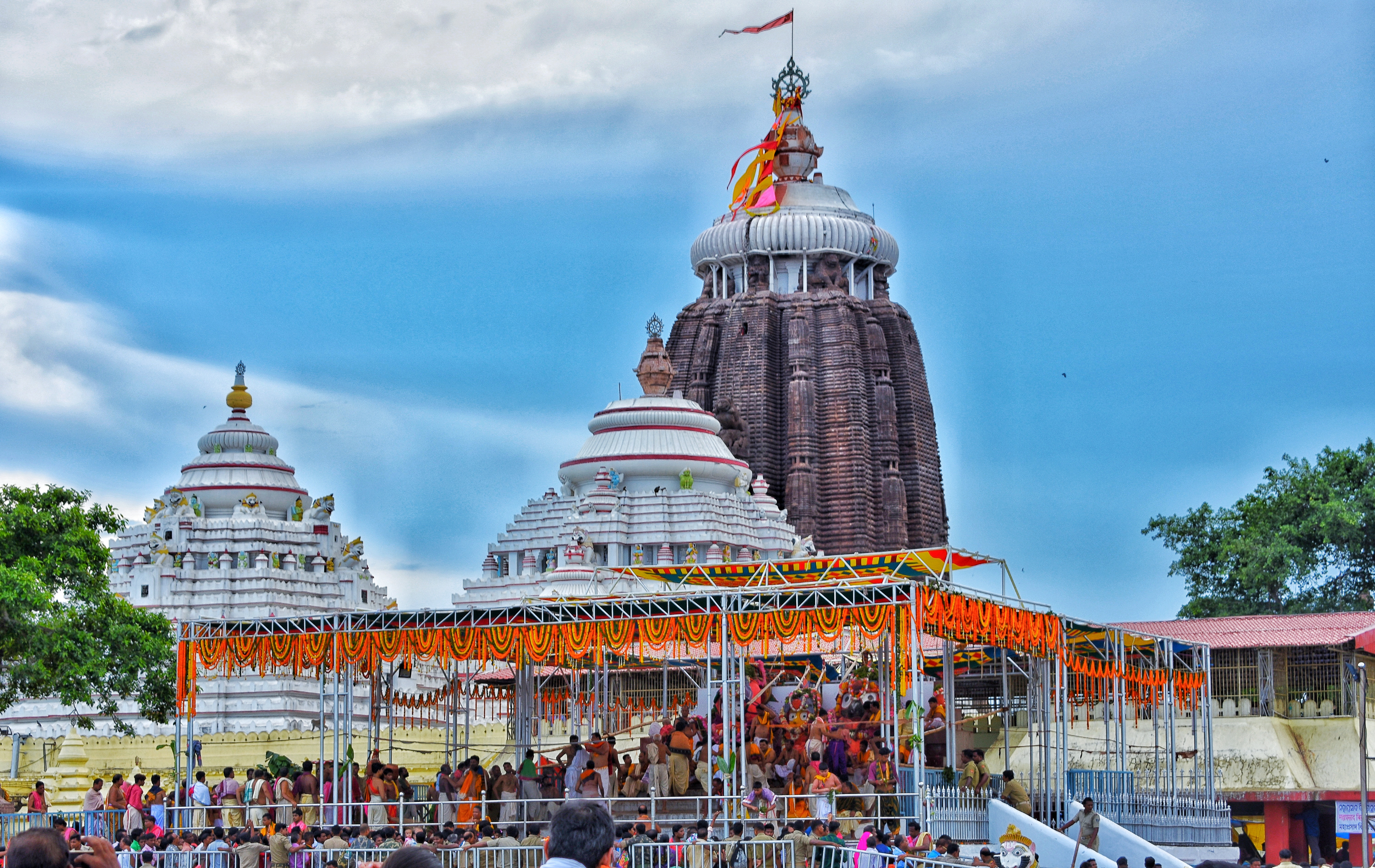

- Location in Odisha Jagannath Temple, Puri (India)

Religion
- Affiliation: Hinduism
- District: Puri
- Deity: Jagannath
- Festivals: Ratha Yatra; Chandan Yatra; Snana Yatra; Nabakalebara
- Governing body: Shri Jagannath Temple Managing Committee

Location
- Location: Puri
- State: Odisha
- Country: India
- Coordinates: 19°48′17″N 85°49′6″E

Architecture
- Type: Kalinga Architecture
- Creator: Indradyumna
- Completed: 1161 CE

Specifications
- Length: 650 feet (east to west)
- Width: 644 feet (north to south)
- Height (max): 214 feet 8 inches
- Site area: 10 acres
- Temple: 31
- Materials: Stone for the temple; Neem wood for the idols
- Elevation: 65.47 m (215 ft)

Website
- https://www.shreejagannatha.in

The Jagannath Temple is a Hindu temple dedicated to Jagannath, a form of Vishnu. It is located in Puri, Odisha, on the eastern coast of India. As per temple records, King Indradyumna of Avanti built the main temple. The present temple complex was rebuilt from the eleventh century onwards on the site of the earlier shrines, excluding the main Jagannath temple, and was begun by Anantavarman Chodaganga, the first ruler of the Eastern Ganga dynasty. Many of the temple rituals are based on Shabari Tantras which are evolved from tribal beliefs respectively. The local legends link the idols with Nilamadhaba deva worshipped by tribala and the daitapatis (servitors) claim to be descendants of the tribes. The temple is one of the 108 Abhimana Kshethram of the Sri Vaishnavite tradition.

The temple is renowned for its annual Ratha Yatra, chariot festival, which honours the three deities - Jagannath, Balabhadra and Subhadra. During the festival, the three principal deities are pulled on large and elaborately decorated raths, or temple cars. The worship is performed by the Bhil Sabar tribal priests, as well as priests of other communities in the temple. Unlike the stone or metal icons found in most Hindu temples, the image of Jagannath is carved from margosa wood and is ceremoniously replaced every 12 or 19 years with an identical replica, with an elaborate month long ceremony called nabakalebar. The temple is one of the Char Dham pilgrimage sites.

The temple is sacred and holy to all Hindus, and especially in those of the Vaishnava traditions. Many great Vaishnava saints, such as Chaitanya Mahaprabhu, Ramanujacharya, Madhvacharya, Nimbarkacharya, Vallabhacharya and Ramananda were closely associated with the temple. Ramanuja established the Emar Matha in the south-eastern corner of the temple, and Adi Shankaracharya established the Govardhan Math, which is the seat of one of the four Shankaracharyas. It is also of particular significance to the followers of Gaudiya Vaishnavism, whose founder, Chaitanya Mahaprabhu, was attracted to the deity, Jagannath, and lived in Puri for many years.

== History ==
=== Early shrine ===
Literary and epigraphic evidence indicates that the site of present-day Puri (also known in early sources as Purusottama Kshetra or Nilachala) had religious significance prior to the construction of the current Jagannath temple by Anantavarman Chodaganga Deva in the 12th century CE. The Skanda Purana's Utkal Khanda has a dedicated section to Puri called the "Purushottama Kshetra Mahatmya", while the Narada Purana and Matsya Purana also refer to Purusottama Kshetra as a sacred location dedicated to Vishnu. The Prabodha Chandrodaya Nataka (c. 11th century CE) of Krishna Mishra also mentions a devayatana (temple or shrine) of Purusottama, indicating an established shrine before the Ganga period. Traditional accounts also record the visit of Adi Shankaracharya to Puri in the 8th-9th century CE, during which he established the Govardhana Matha, further supporting the presence of an active pilgrimage centre before the 12th century architectural phase.

=== Ancient and medieval period ===
The earliest major reconstruction of the Jagannath Temple complex at Puri is attributed to Anantavarman Chodaganga of the Eastern Ganga dynasty, who ruled c. 1078-1150 CE and established the foundational structure of the present temple around the early 12th century. This is supported by the Kendupatna copper-plate inscription of his descendant, Narasingha Deva I, and inscriptions from Rajendra Chola's maternal side. Anantavarman was originally a Shaivite, and became a Vaishnavite sometime after he conquered the Utkala region, in which the temple is located, in 1112 CE. A 1134–1135 CE inscription records his donation to the temple. Therefore, the temple construction must have started sometime after 1112 CE.

Anantavarman's successor Anangabhima Deva III (r. c. 1211-1238 CE) formally dedicated the kingdom of Utkala to Jagannath and issued copper-plate inscriptions describing himself as the Rauta (servant) of the deity rather than a sovereign ruler. During the 15th-16th centuries, the Gajapati kings of Odisha, such as Kapilendra Deva and his successors, institutionalised the temple as a major state-supported religious centre under the Gajapati monarchy.

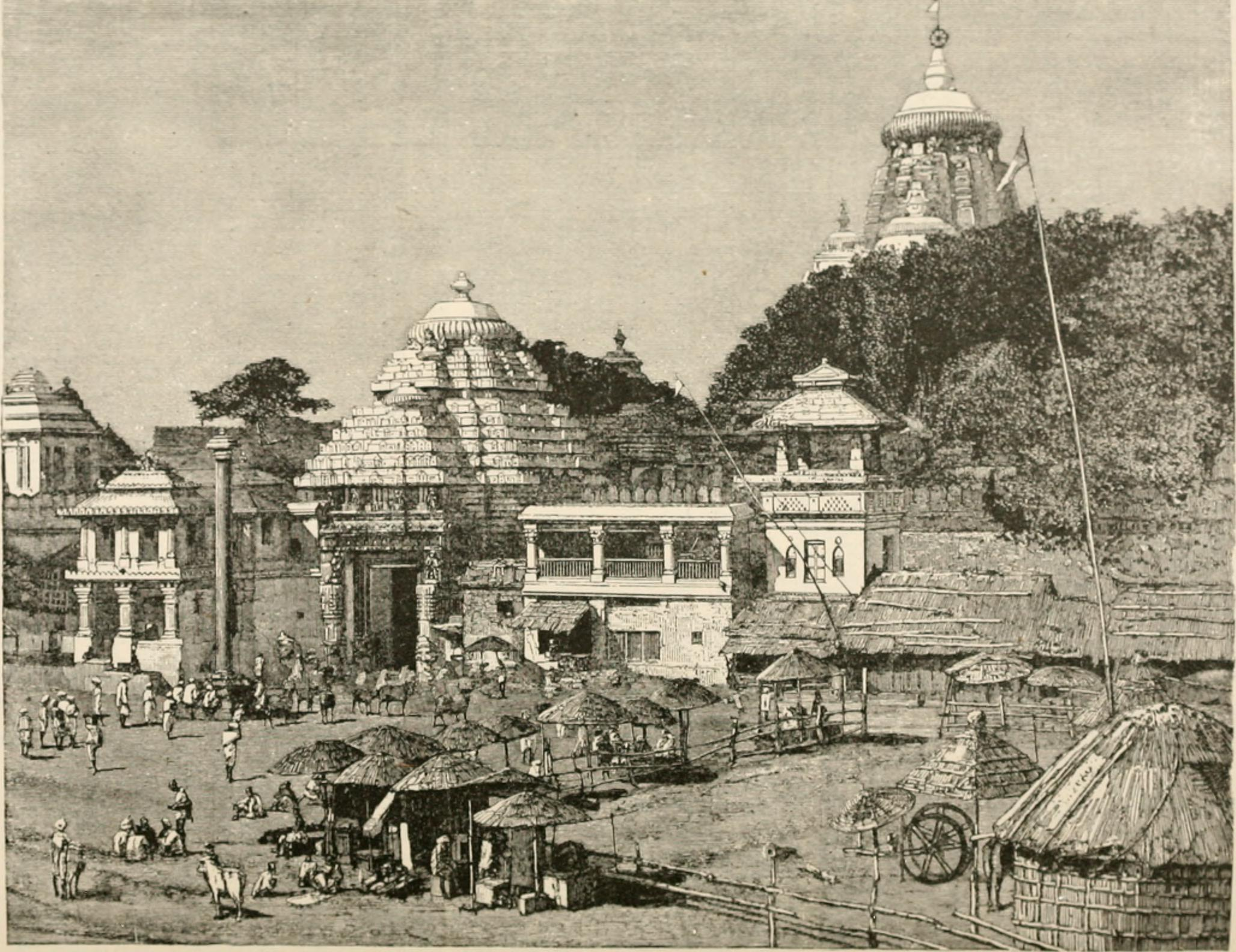
Engraving sketch of front gate of Jagannath Temple, 1891

=== Bengal invasion and restoration ===
In 1568 CE, following the defeat of the Gajapati ruler Mukunda Deva, the Bengali Muslim general Kalapahar of the Bengal Sultanate invaded Puri and attacked the Jagannath Temple. The Madala Panji and regional chronicles state that the temple treasury was looted and the wooden images of Jagannath, Balabhadra, and Subhadra were desecrated. The images were removed from the temple, discovered by Kalapahar, and burned. Temple traditions state that Bisara Mohanty recovered the Brahma Padartha of the damaged image of Jagannath and preserved it in a mridanga (drum) after the attack. During the late 16th century, Ramachandra Deva I of Khurda re-established the Jagannath temple and commissioned new wooden images for worship. The deities were reinstalled at Puri in 1575 CE, marking the first ritual of Nabakalevara.

=== Mughal rule ===
During Mughal rule, the temple continued to face periodic attacks, military occupations, and heavy political pressure. Governors and military commanders such as Mirza Khurram, Hashim Khan, Kesodas Maru, Kalyan Mal, Mukarram Khan, and later officials under Aurangzeb launched raids on Puri during the 17th century. The temple annals, the Madala Panji, records that the Jagannath temple has been invaded and plundered 18 times. Temple wealth was repeatedly plundered, and the deities were frequently moved by servitors to locations around Chilika, Khorddha, Banpur, Kodala, and other regions for protection. The temple has been attacked 18 times

=== British colonial rule ===
Following the British conquest of Odisha in 1803, the East India Company assumed control of the Jagannath Temple's administration. Regulation IV of 1806 placed the temple under a board of government-appointed Brahmins. In 1809, this arrangement was replaced by hereditary supervision under the Raja of Khorddha and his successors. The British continued the Maratha-era pilgrim tax, classifying pilgrims according to their financial status while exempting ascetics and the poor. Revenue from the tax funded temple expenses, repairs, and pilgrimage infrastructure, including improvements to the road between Puri and Calcutta. Between 1805 and 1827, annual collections averaged approximately one lakh rupees.

==== Missionary criticism of temple administration ====
The temple's administration became the subject of controversy in Britain. Christian missionaries and religious organisations argued that government management of a Hindu temple and the collection of pilgrim taxes amounted to official support for "idolatry". Petitions submitted to the British Parliament and the Court of Directors called for the termination of state involvement in temple affairs. In response, the Court of Directors issued a dispatch in 1833 directing that British interference in the management of religious institutions should cease. The pilgrim tax was subsequently abolished under Act 10 of 1840. Although the Raja of Khorddha retained responsibility for the temple's internal administration, the government continued till 1863 to provide financial support and oversee certain temple lands. The Jagannath Temple thereafter remained under indigenous management for the remainder of the colonial period.

=== Post Independence ===
Following Indian independence in 1947, the administration of the Jagannath Temple was reorganised under state legislation. The Puri Shri Jagannath Temple (Administration) Act, 1952 initiated the documentation of temple rights and customs, while the Shri Jagannath Temple Act, 1955 established a formal management system for the temple. The Act came into force on 27 October 1960 and vested administration in the Shri Jagannath Temple Managing Committee, headed by the Gajapati Maharaja of Puri. Amended in 1983, the Act remains the principal legal framework governing the temple's administration and property.

== Deities ==
Jagannath, Subhadra and Balabhadra are the principal deities worshipped in the temple. The inner sanctum of the temple houses images of them, carved from sacred neem wood (daru), placed on the jewelled platform (ratnabedi). The sanctum also contains the deities Sudarshana Chakra, Madanmohan, Sridevi and Vishwadhatri. The deities are adorned with different clothing and ornaments according to the season. Their worship predates the construction of the temple and may have originated in an ancient tribal shrine. The earliest known reference to Jagannath appears in the Oddiyana Vajrayāna Tantric text Jñānasiddhi by Indrabhuti, which begins with an invocation of the deity. (Note: Pranipatya Jagannatham Sarvajina Vararchitam. Sarva Buddha Mayam Siddhi Vyapinam Gaganopamam.) In Sarala Mahabharata, Sarala Das presents Lord Jagannath in multiple forms, emphasising his connection to Krishna. He also described Lord Jagannath as being one with Krishna, Rama, and Buddha, reflecting a synthesis of the different faith traditions.

=== Legends ===
According to legends recorded in Madala Panji, the construction of the first Jagannath temple was commissioned by King Indradyumna of Satya Yuga, a Malava king mentioned in the Mahabharata and the Puranas.

Indradyumna commissioned the construction of a monument for Jagannath that was intended to be the tallest in the world. The construction was said to measure 1,000 cubits (457.2 meters) in height. He invited Brahma, the cosmic creator, to consecrate the temple and its images.

According to traditional accounts, the origins of the Jagannath temple trace back to Satya Yuga, when the original image of Jagannath was said to have manifested near a banyan tree by the shore in the form of the Indranila Mani (the Blue Jewel). It was said to be so dazzling that it could grant instant moksha. The god Dharma sought to conceal it within the earth and succeeded. In the Satya Yuga, Indradyumna wanted to find that mysterious image. To achieve that he performed severe penance. Vishnu then instructed him to go to the seashore at Puri, where he would find a floating log from which the image could be carved.

Indradyumna then discovered the log of wood. He performed a yajna, from which Narasimha appeared and instructed that Narayana be manifested as a fourfold expansion: Paramatma as Vasudeva (Krishna),Vyuha as Samkarshana (Balabhadra), Yogamaya as Subhadra, and Vibhava as Sudarshana. After this, Vishwakarma appeared in the form of an artisan and prepared images of Jagannath, Balabadra and Subhadra from the tree.

When this log, radiant with light, was seen floating in the sea, Narada told the king to make three deities out of it and place them in a pavilion. Indradyumna got Vishwakarma, the architect of gods, to build a magnificent temple to house the deities, and Vishnu himself appeared in the guise of a carpenter to make the deities, on condition that he was to be left undisturbed until he finished the work.

But just after two weeks, the queen of Indradyumna became very anxious. She took the carpenter to be dead as no sound came from the temple. Therefore, she requested the king to open the door. Thus, they went to see Vishnu at work, at which the latter abandoned his work, leaving the deities unfinished. The deity was devoid of any hands. But a divine voice told Indradyumna to install them in the temple. It has also been widely believed that in spite of the deity being without hands, it can watch over the world and be its lord. Thus, the idiom.

== Entry and Darshan ==
Entry to the temple is restricted to Hindus, and non-Hindus are not permitted inside the premises.

Such a rule is believed to have existed since the temple was built, that have lasted for several decades. The temple is open everyday from 5:00 am to 10:30 pm.

== Cultural significance ==
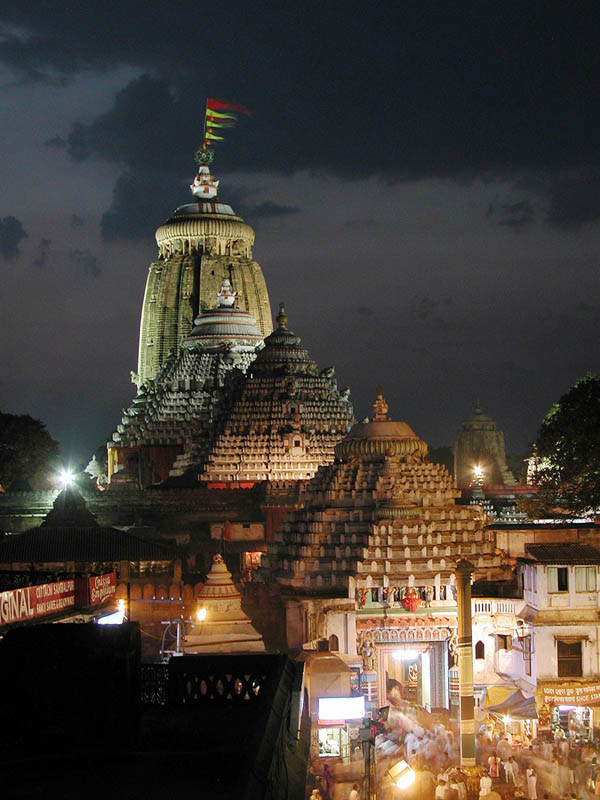
The Jagannath Temple at night

According to historical traditions, Jagannath is believed to have originated as a tribal deity venerated by the Bhil and Sabar communities as a form of Narayana. Another legend identifies him as Nilamadhava, a blue-stone image of Narayana that was worshipped by these tribal groups. He was brought to Nilagiri, the blue mountain, or Nilachala, and installed there as Jagannath, in company with Balabhadra and Subhadra. Worship of wooden images at the Jagannath temple is claimed to have a distant connection with the Vanvasi, or forest dwellers, who traditionally worship wooden poles. The Daitapatis, who are responsible for performing certain temple rituals, are claimed to be descendants of the hill tribes of Odisha and are also believed to be closely related to Jagannath. The cultural history of Shrikshetra, regarded as the cultural capital of Odisha, is traced to the traditions of Hindu tribes. The three deities came to be regarded as the symbols of Samyak Darshan, Samyak Jnana, and Samyak Charita, together known as Ratnatraya, the triple gems of the Jain culture, whose assimilation is believed to lead to omniscience and moksha (salvation).

=== Acharyas and Jagannatha Puri ===
Many renowned acharyas, including Madhvacharya, are believed to have visited this kshetra. Adi Shankaracharya established the Govardhan Math here. Guru Nanak had visited this place with his disciples Bala and Mardana. Chaitanya Mahaprabhu the founder of Gaudiya Vaishnavism resided here for 24 years and taught that the love of God can be spread by chanting the Hare Krishna mantra. Vallabha is traditionally believed to have visited the temple, where he performed a seven-day recitation of the Srimad Bhagavata. His sitting place, known as his baithakji, (literally "seat") remains a notable site and is regarded as evidence of his visit to Puri.

Some of the pandits who participated in the recitation said to become jealous of the young Vallabha and sought to test him. The following day was Ekadashi, a fasting observance during which devotees abstain from grains. The pandits offered Vallabha rice prasad of Lord Jagannath, for which the temple remains renowned. Accepting it would break his vow of fasting, while refusing it would have been seen as disrespectful to Jagannath. Vallabha, with due honour and respect, accepted the prasad in his hand. He remained in the temple, spending the rest of the day and night explaining the shlokas that extolled the greatness of prasad, and consumed it the following morning after sunrise.

The Sikh aarti "Gagan mein thaal" was recited by the first Sikh guru, Guru Nanak, in 1506 or 1508, during his udasi (spritiual journey) to eastern India, at the revered Jagannath Temple, Puri. Unlike traditional aarti, it is sung without the use of platters, lamps or other ritual implements.

=== Char Dham ===
Char Dham

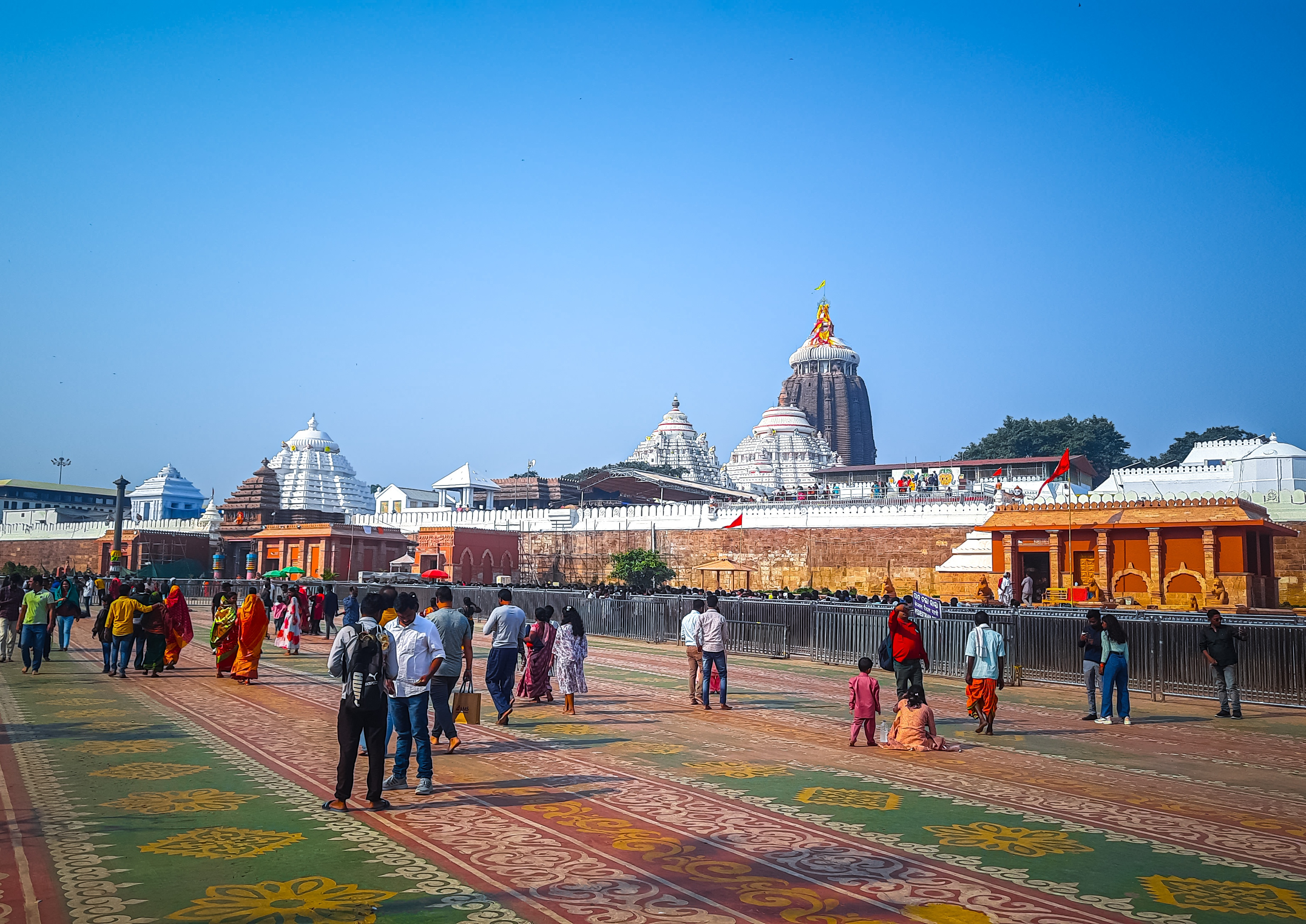
Jagannath Puri

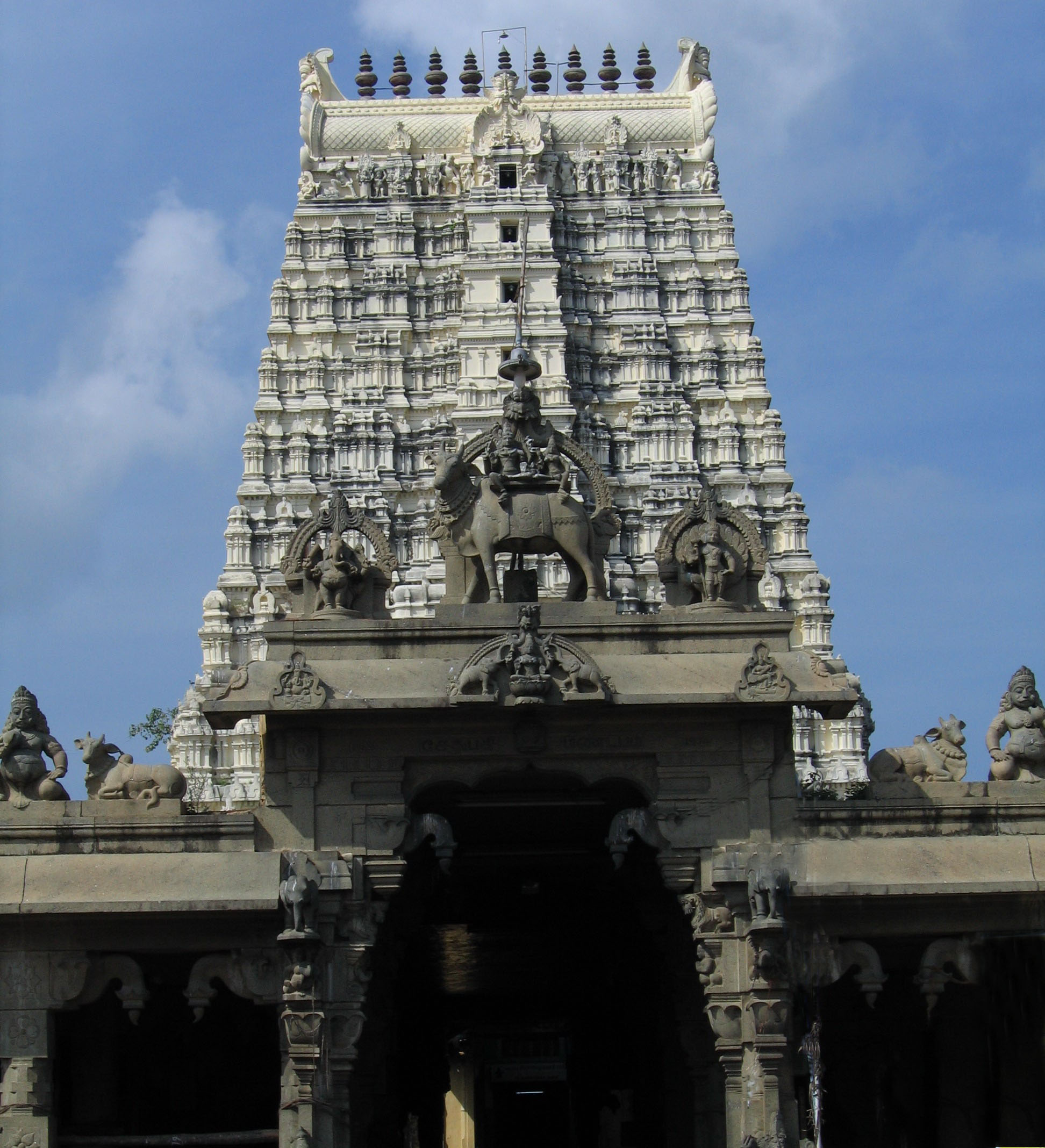
Rameswaram

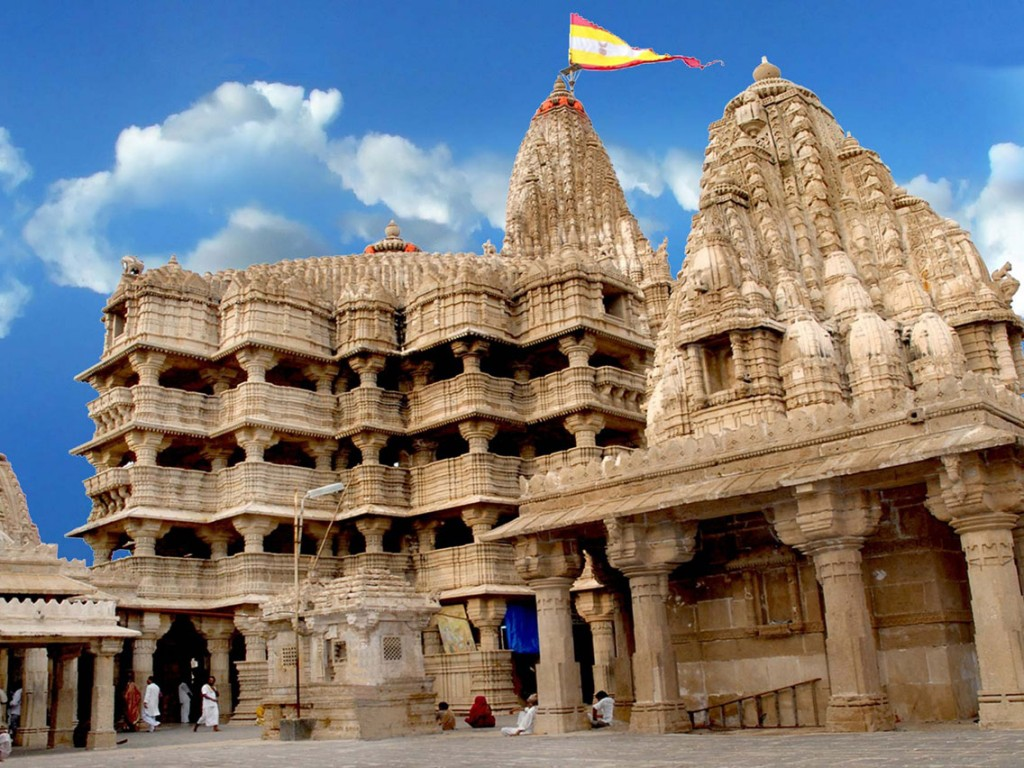
Dwarka

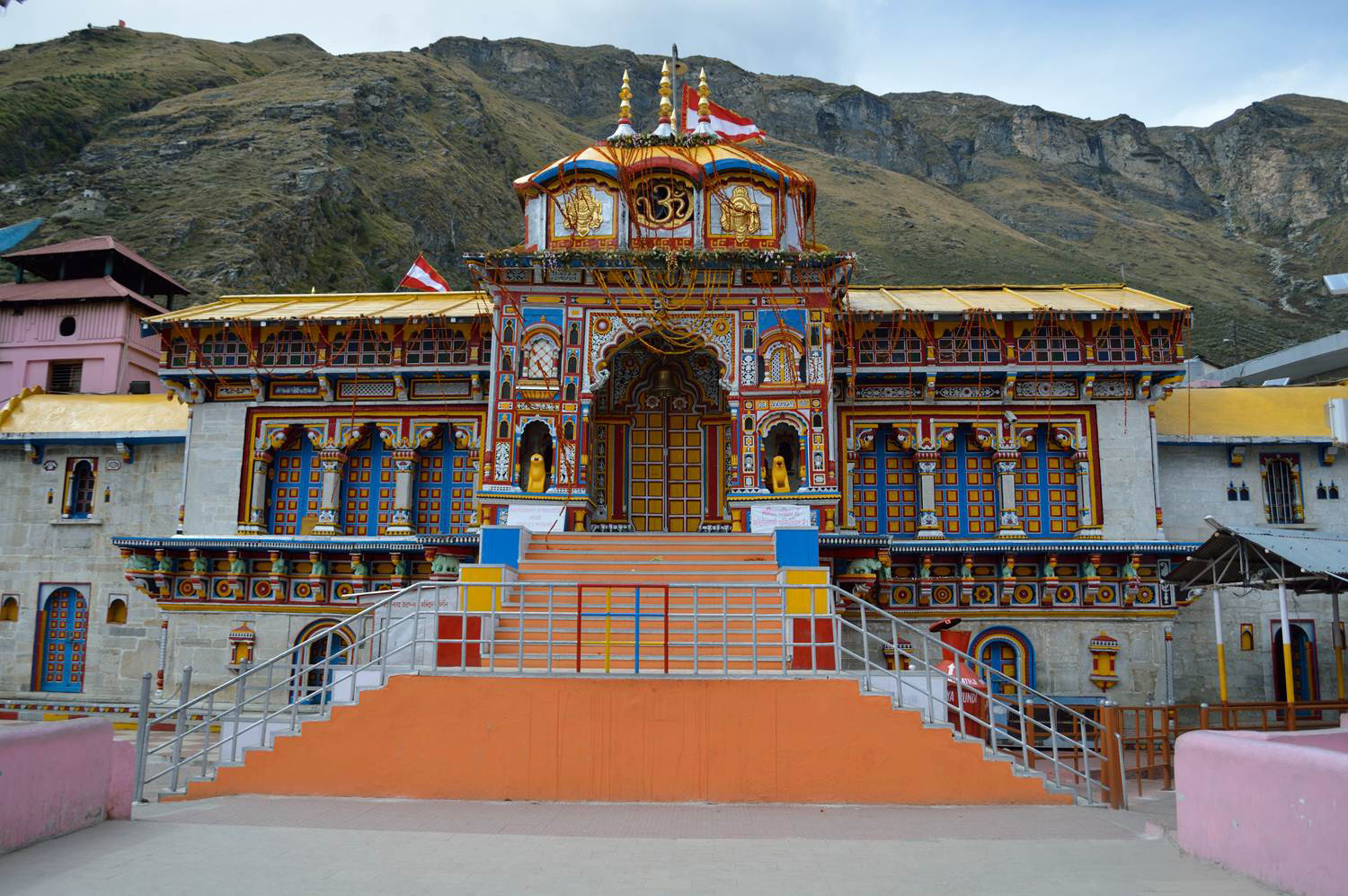
Badrinath

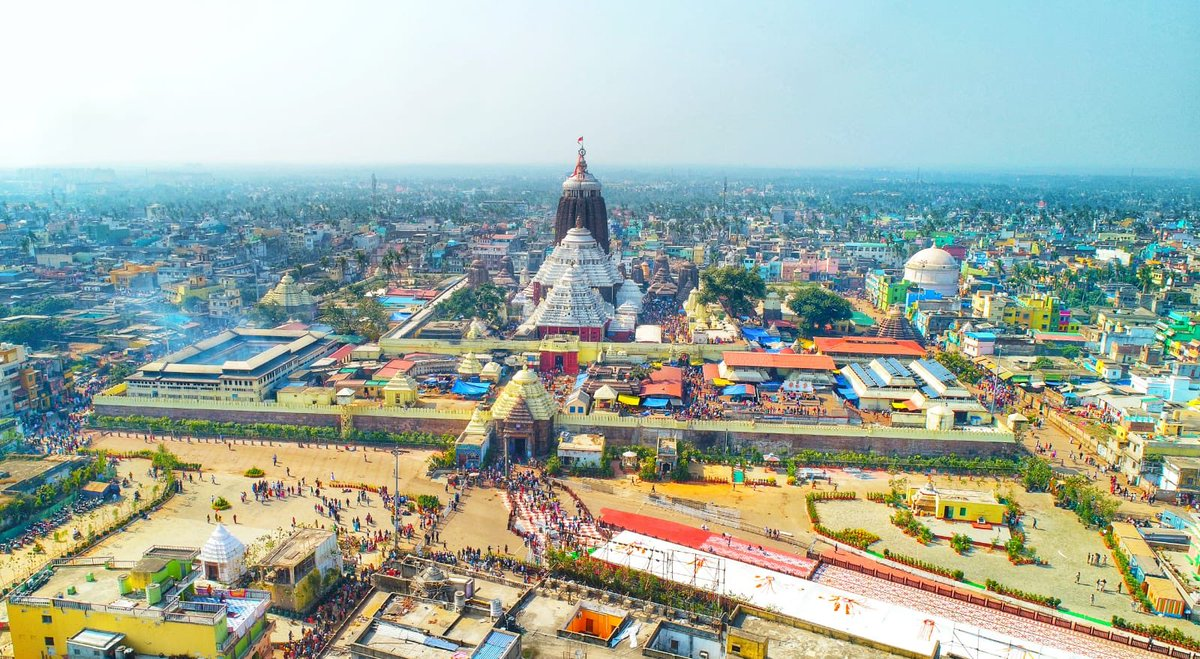
Bird's eye view of Jagannath Temple

The temple is one of the four Vaishnava Hindu pilgrimage sites collectively known as the Char Dham, the others being Rameswaram, Badrinath and Dwarka. The origins of the Char Dham are uncertain, but the Advaita school of Hinduism propagated by Adi Shankaracharya, who established Hindu monastic institutions across India, attributes the origin of Char Dham to the seer. The four temples are located at the cardinal points of India: Badrinath Temple in the north at Badrinath, Jagannath Temple in the east at Puri, Dwarakadheesh Temple in the west at Dwarka and Ramanathaswamy Temple in the south at Rameswaram. Although the temples are ideologically associated with different sections of Hinduism, namely Shaivism and Vaishnavism, the four pilgrimage sites are regarded as integral to Hinduism as a whole. The pilgrimage to the four cardinal points of India is regarded as sacred by Hindus, who aspire to visit these temples at least once in their lifetime. Traditionally, the pilgrimage begins at Puri in the east and proceeds clockwise, following the customary practice of circumambulation in Hindu temples.

== Architectural description ==
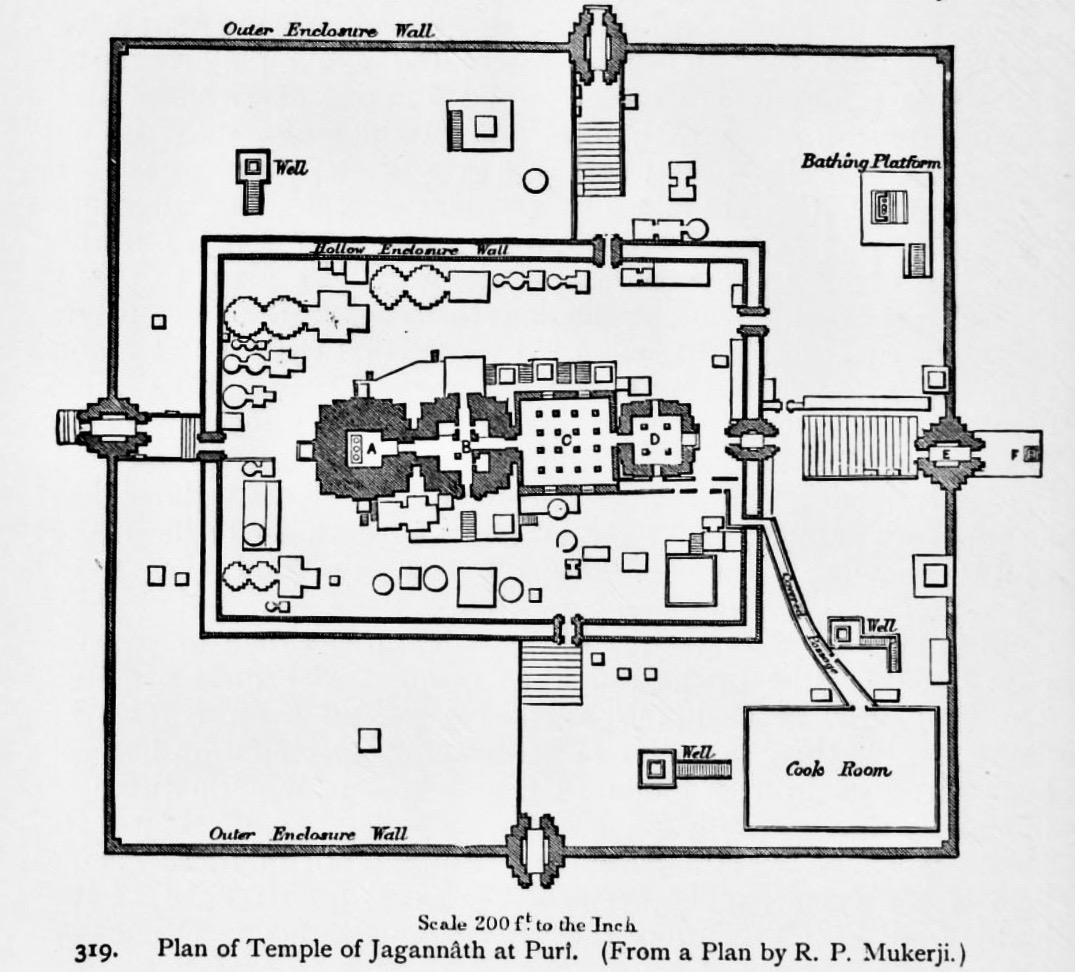
Site plan of Jagannath Temple, c. 1910: A. Main Sanctum (Garbha-Griha, Deul); B. Audience Hall (Jagamohana, Pidha Deul); C. Dancing Hall (Nat-Mandap, Nata Mandir); D. Offering Hall (Bhoga-Mandap, Bhog Mandir); E. Main Gate (Singha Dwara); F. (Aruna Stambha)

The temple complex, which contains at least 120 temples and shrines, covers more than 37,000 square metres (400,000 sq ft) and is enclosed by a high fortified wall. The wall, 6.1 metres (20 ft) high, is known as Meghanada Pacheri. Another wall, called kurma bedha, surrounds the main temple. With its sculptural richness and the fluidity of Kalinga architecture, it is regarded as one of the most magnificent temples in India. he temple comprises four distinct sections: the deula; the vimana (garbhagriha or sanctum sanctorum), where the triad deities are placed on the ratnavedi (“throne of pearls”); the mukhashala (frontal porch); the natamandapa, also known as the jagamohan (audience or dancing hall); and the bhogamandapa (offerings hall). In the Rekha Deula style, these elements appear in sequence, with the vimana forming the main tower and the associated halls extending westward. The main temple is curvilinear in design, and its summit is crowned by the Nila chakra, an eight-spoked wheel associated with Vishnu. It is crafted from ashtadhatu, an alloy of eight metals, and is regarded as sacrosanct. Among the temples of Odisha, the Jagannath temple is the tallest. Its tower, constructed on a raised stone platform, rises 65 metres (214 ft) above the inner sanctum where the deities reside and dominates the surrounding landscape. The pyramidal roofs of the surrounding temples and adjoining halls, or mandapas, rise in tiers toward the tower, resembling a ridge of mountain peaks.

=== Nila Chakra ===
The Nila Chakra (lit. "blue discus") is mounted atop the shikhara of the Jagannath temple. By custom, a different flag is hoisted on the Nila Chakra each day. The flag hoisted on the Nila Chakra is called the Patita Pavana (lit. "Purifier of the Fallen"), and is equivalent to the image of the deities placed in the sanctum sanctorum.

The Nila Chakra is a disc with eight Navagunjaras carved along its outer circumference, all facing the flagpost above. It is made of ashtadhatu and measures 3.5 metres (11 ft) in height, with a circumference of about 11 metres (36 ft).

=== The Singhadwara ===
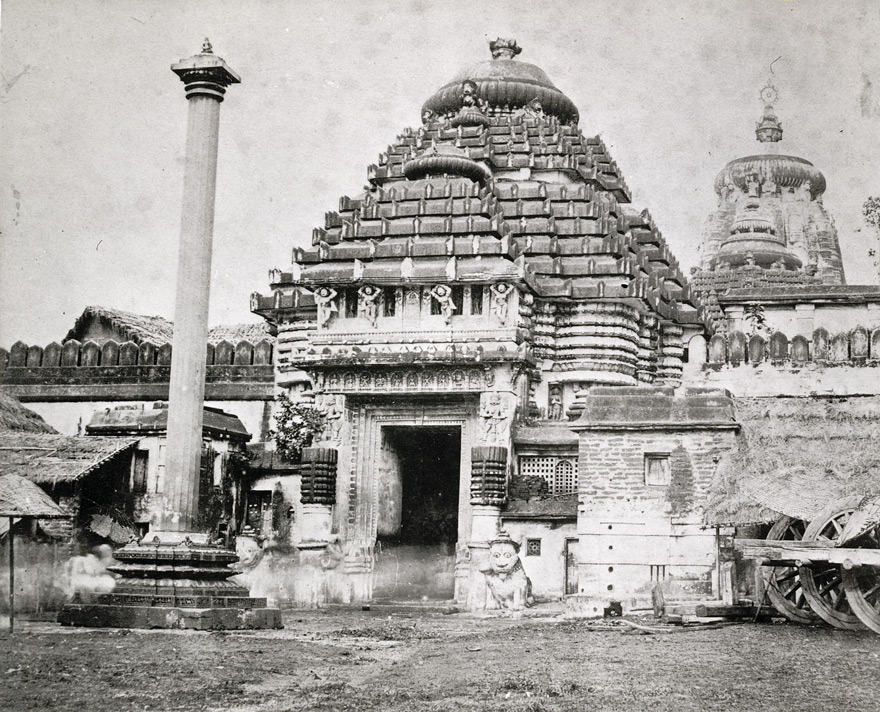
The Singhadwara in 1870, with lion sculptures and the Aruna Stambha in the foreground

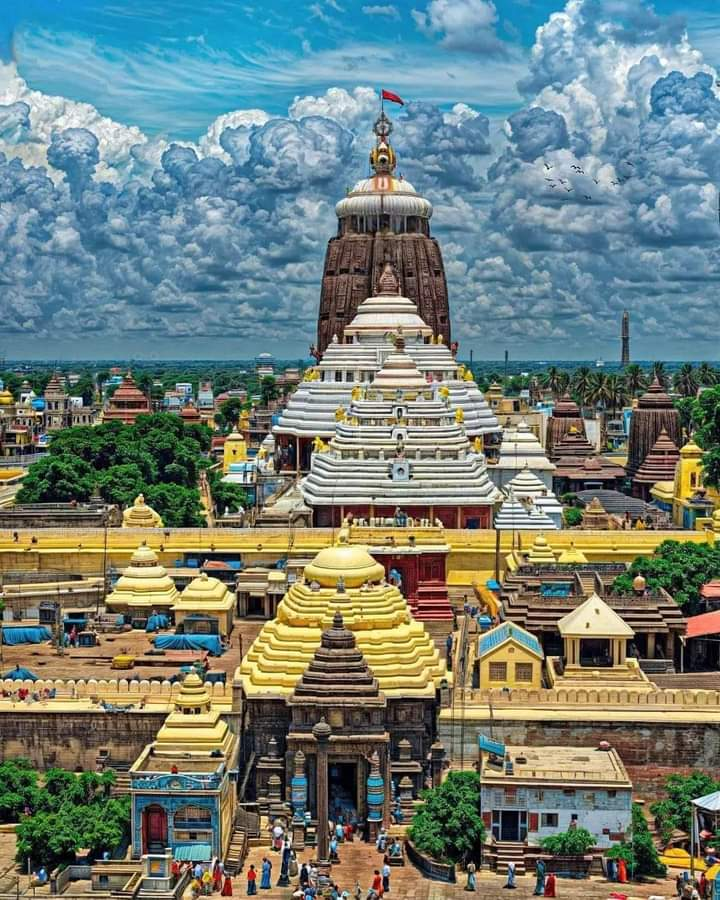
The Singhadhwara of the temple complex, with the main temple spire in the background

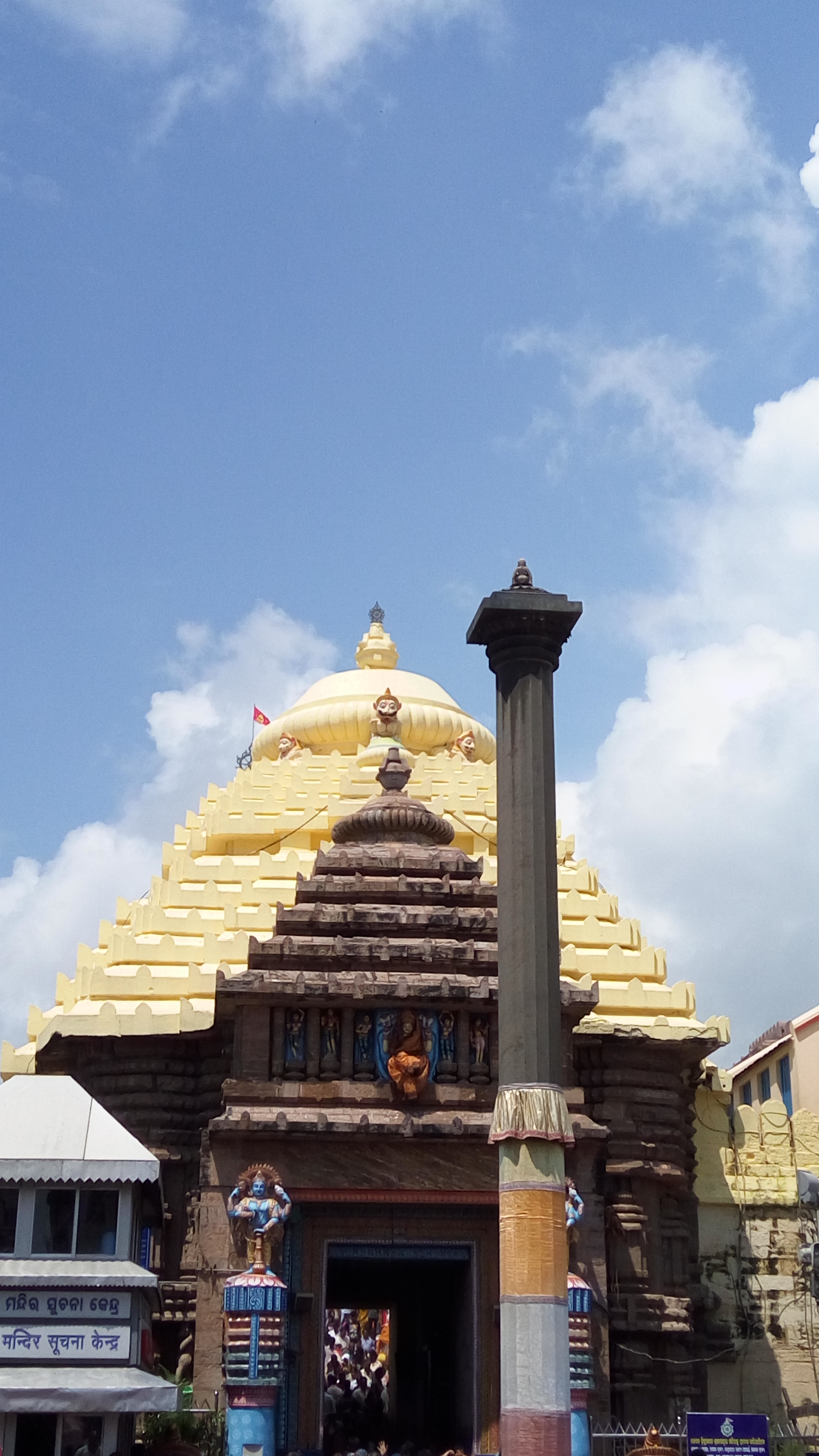
Statue of Aruna, charioteer of Surya, atop the Aruna Stambha in front of the Singhadwara

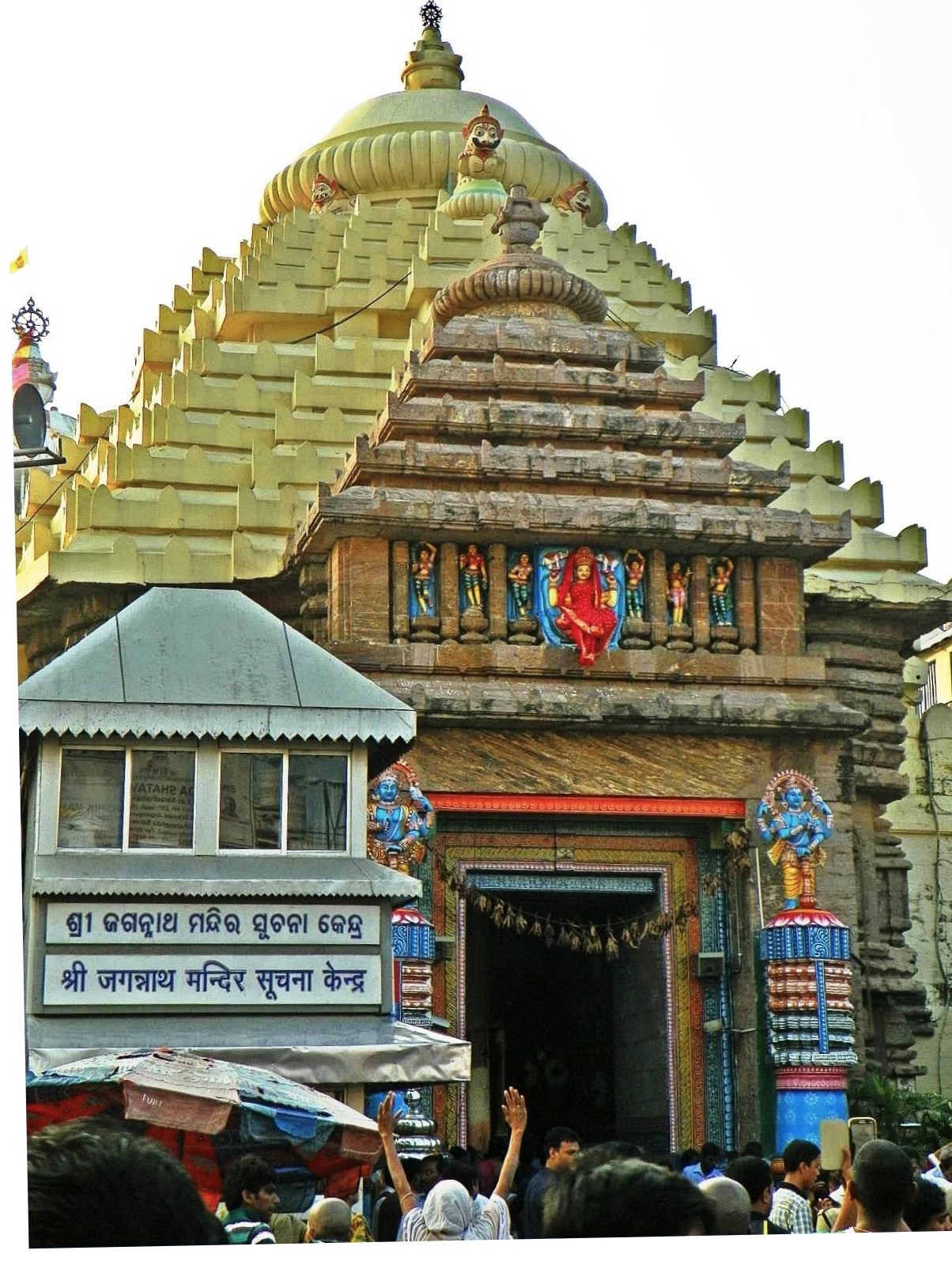
The Singhadwara of the temple at present

The Singhadwara (Sanskrit for "Lion Gate") is one of the four gates of the temple, and serves as the main entrance. It is named for the large statue of crouching lion positioned on either side of the gateway. The gate faces east, opening onto the Bada Danda (the "Grand Road"). The Baisi Pahacha, a flight of twenty-two steps, leads into the temple complex. A representation of Jagannath known as Patita Pavana (Sanskrit for "savior of the downtrodden and the fallen") is painted on the right side of the entrance. In ancient times, when untouchables were not allowed inside the temple, they could pray to the Patita Pavana. The statues of the temple guards, Jaya and Vijaya, stand on either side of the doorway. Shortly before the commencement of the Ratha Yatra, the deities Jagannath, Balabhadra and Subhadra are taken out of the temple through this gate. On their return from the Gundicha Temple, they must ceremonially placate Goddess Lakshmi, whose image is carved atop the door, for neglecting to take her with them on the Yatra. Only then does the goddess grant them permission to enter the temple. A sixteen-sided monolithic pillar, known as the Aruna Stambha, stands in front of the main gate. At its top is an idol of Aruna, the charioteer of the sun god Surya. Prior to its current location, the Aruna Stambha stood at the Konark Sun Temple. It was later brought from Konark by the Maratha guru Brahmachari Gosain.

=== Other entrances ===
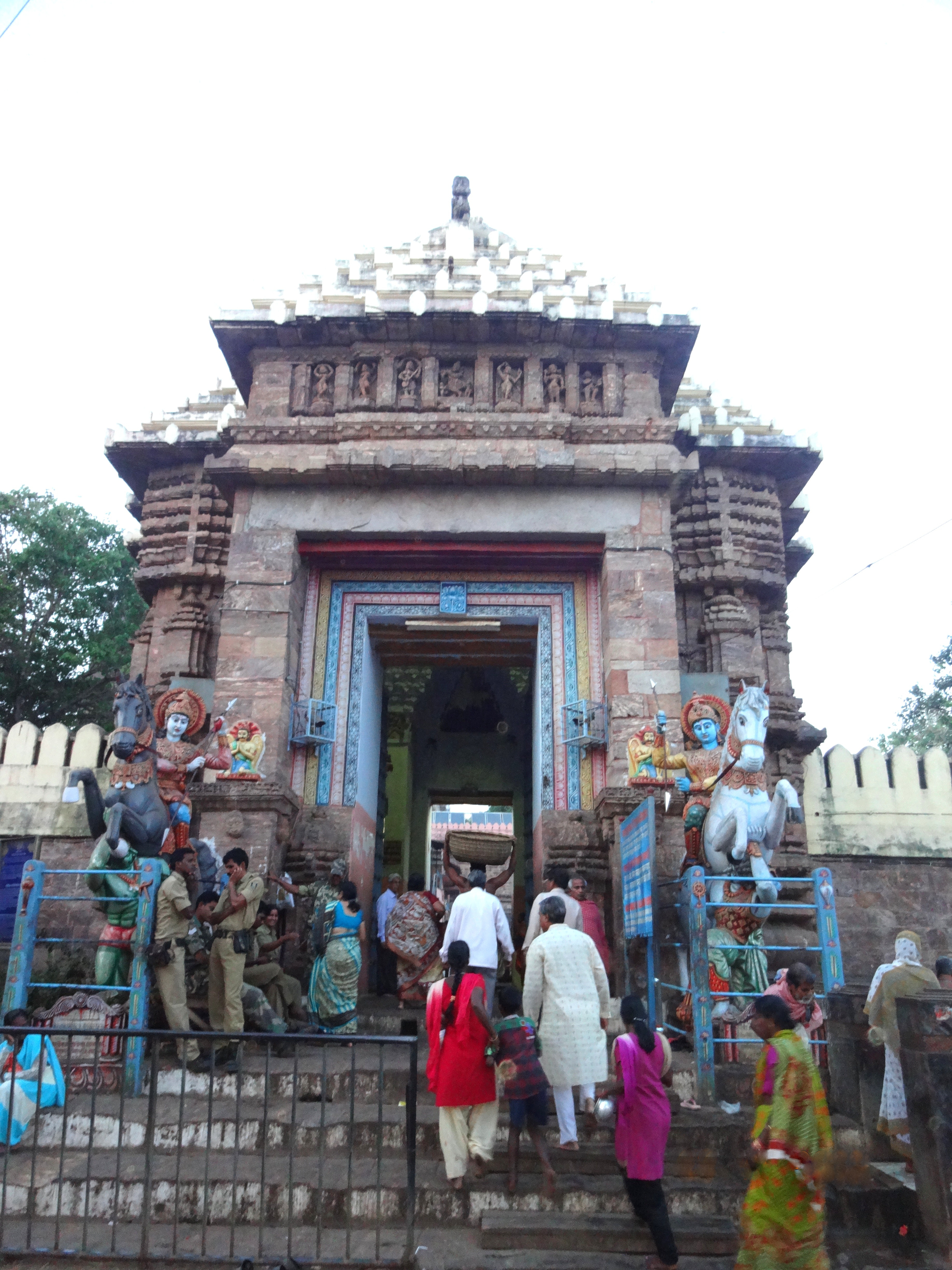
The Ashwadwara Gate

Apart from the Singhadwara, the temple's main entrance, there are three other entrances facing north, south and west. Named for the animal sculptures that guard them, they are the Hathidwara (Elephant Gate), the Vyaghradwara (Tiger Gate) and the Ashwadwara (Horse Gate).

=== Minor temples ===
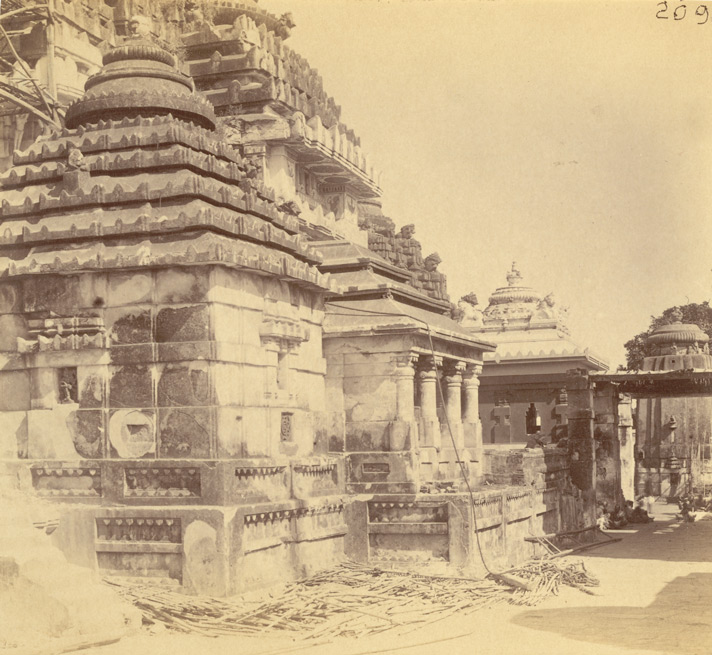
Cluster of minor temples in the southern part of Jagannath temple complex, including the Vimala Temple (extreme right), c. 1890

Within the temple complex, there are about thirty smaller temples and shrines where active worship is regularly conducted. Several of these are considered significant and are generally visited before entering the main Jagannath temple. Notable examples include the Ganesha Temple near the kalpavata banyan tree, Vimala Temple, Nilamadhaba Temple, Gopalaballava Temple and Lakshmi Temple.

The Vimala Temple (Bimala Temple) is regarded as one of the most important of the Shakta pithas. It is situated near Rohini Kund within the temple complex. The food offered to Jagannath is not considered Mahaprasad until it is offered to Goddess Vimala. The Lakshmitemple, dedicated to the consort of Jagannath, plays an important role in the rituals of the main temple.

There are additional shrines within the complex dedicated to Kanchi Ganesha, Shiva, Surya, Saraswati, Bhuvaneshwari, Narasimha, Rama, and Hanuman.

=== The Mandapas ===
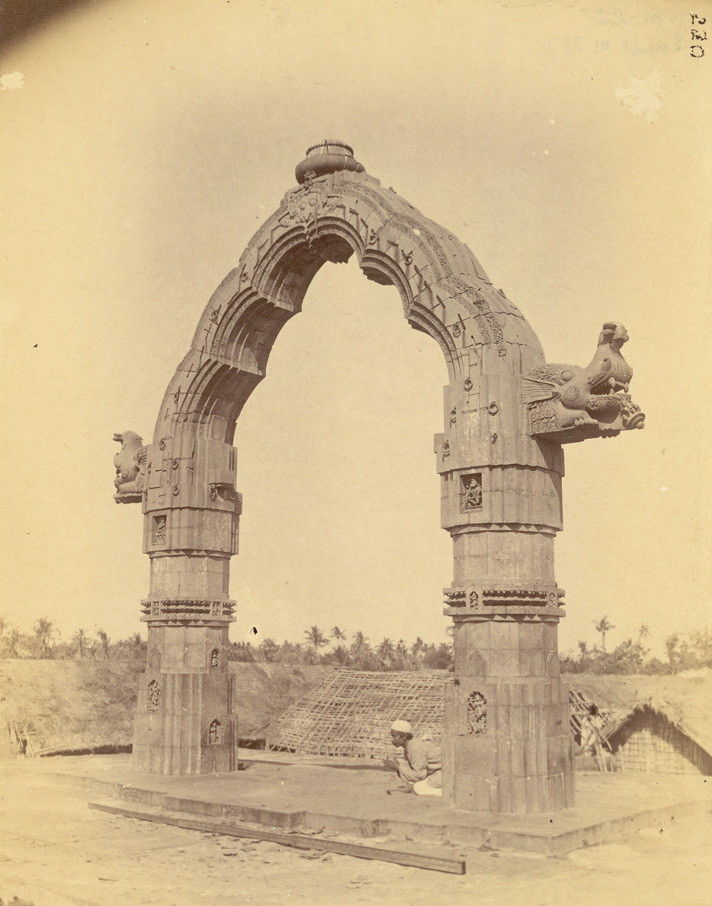
The Dola Mandapa in 1890, where the annual Dol Yatra is held.

There are many mandapas, or pillared halls on raised platforms, within the temple complex that serves as venues for religious congregations. The most prominent is the Mukti Mandapa, the congregation hall associated with the holy seat of selected learned Brahmins.

== Daily food offerings ==
Daily offerings are made to the deity six times a day. These include:

- The Gopala Vallabha Bhoga, the morning offering regarded as the deity's breakfast. It consists of seven items: Khoa, Lahuni, sweetened coconut grating, coconut water, and rice grain sweetened with sugar known as Khai, curd and ripe bananas.
  - The next offering, Sakala Dhupa, is made at about 10 am. It generally includes thirteen items, including the Enduri pitha and the Mantha puli.
- The next offering, Bada Sankhudi Bhoga, consist of Pakhala with curd and Kanji payas. The offerings are made in the Bhog Mandapa, located about 61 metres (200 ft) from the Ratnabedi. This ritual is called the Chatra Bhog, and is traditionally attributed to Adi Shankaracharya, who is believed to have introduced it in the eighth century to enable pilgrims to share the temple food.
- Madhyanha dhupa forms the next offering at the noon.
- The evening offering to the deity, Sandhya Dhupa, is performed at around 8 p.m.
- The final offering of the day to the deity is called Bada Singhara Bhoga.

== Rosaghara ==
The temple's kitchen is the second largest in the world. According to tradition, all Mahaprasad cooked in the temple kitchen is supervised by Goddess Lakshmi, regarded as the empress of the temple. It is believed that if the food contains any fault in it, a shadow dog appears near the kitchen as a sign of her displeasure. When the shadow dog is sighted, the food is promptly buried and a new batch is prepared. All fifty-six varieties of food are vegetarian and cooked without onions or garlic.

== Festivals ==
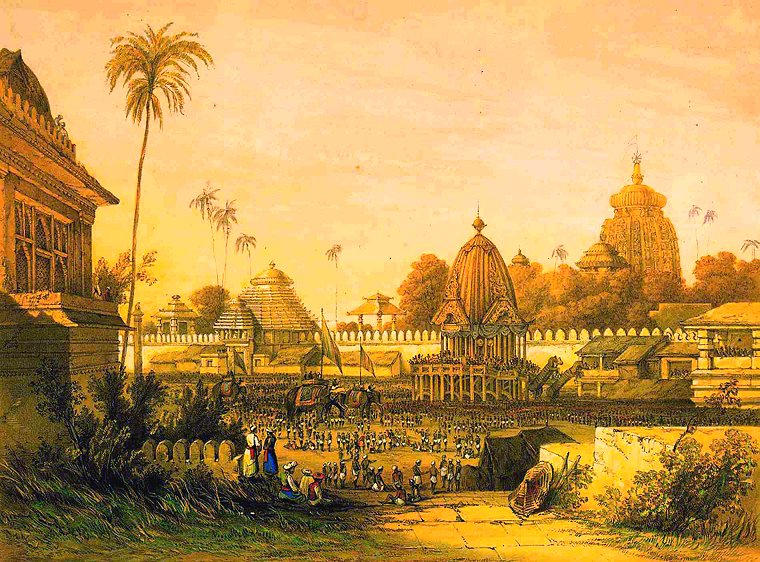
Ratha Yatra festival in Puri, a painting by James Fergusson

Numerous festivals are held in the temple complex each year, attracting millions of people. Some of the principal festivals celebrated include Anavasara, Ratha Yatra, Niladri Bije, Gupta Gundicha, Nabakalebara, and Pana Sankranti (or Vishuva Sankranti).

=== Anavasara or Anasara ===
Every year, the principal deities -Jagannath, Balabhadra, Subhadra and Sudarshan- retire to a secluded chamber called Anavasara Ghar after the holy Snana Yatra on Jyeshtha Purnima, where they remain for the following dark fortnight, or Krishna Paksha. According to tradition, the deities are believed to fall ill after undergoing the ceremonial bathing ritual, and they are tended for fifteen days by the special servitors known as Daitapatis. During this period, cooked food is not offered to the deities. Hence, devotees are not permitted to view the deities, and instead offer worship at the nearby temple of Alarnath at Brahmagiri, where a four-armed Vishnu is revered as a manifestation of Jagannath. Devotees received their first glimpse of the deities on the day before Ratha Yatra, an occasion known as Navayouvana.

=== Ratha Yatra at Puri ===
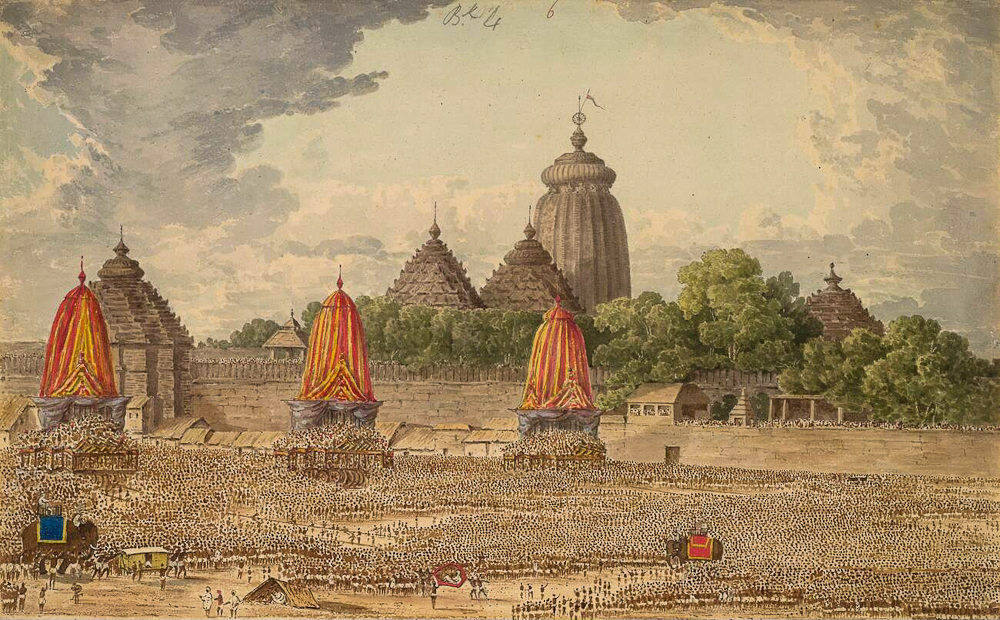
Artwork depicting the Ratha Yatra in Puri, 1818

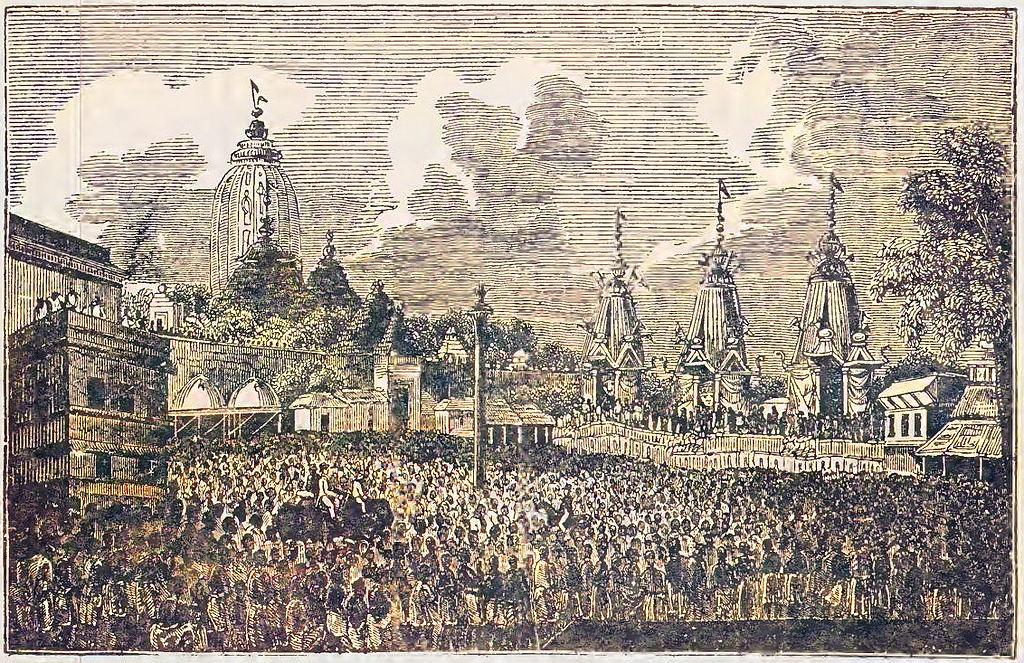
Drawing of Ratha Yatra, Puri, from the book, Account Of The Temple Of Jagannath, 1895

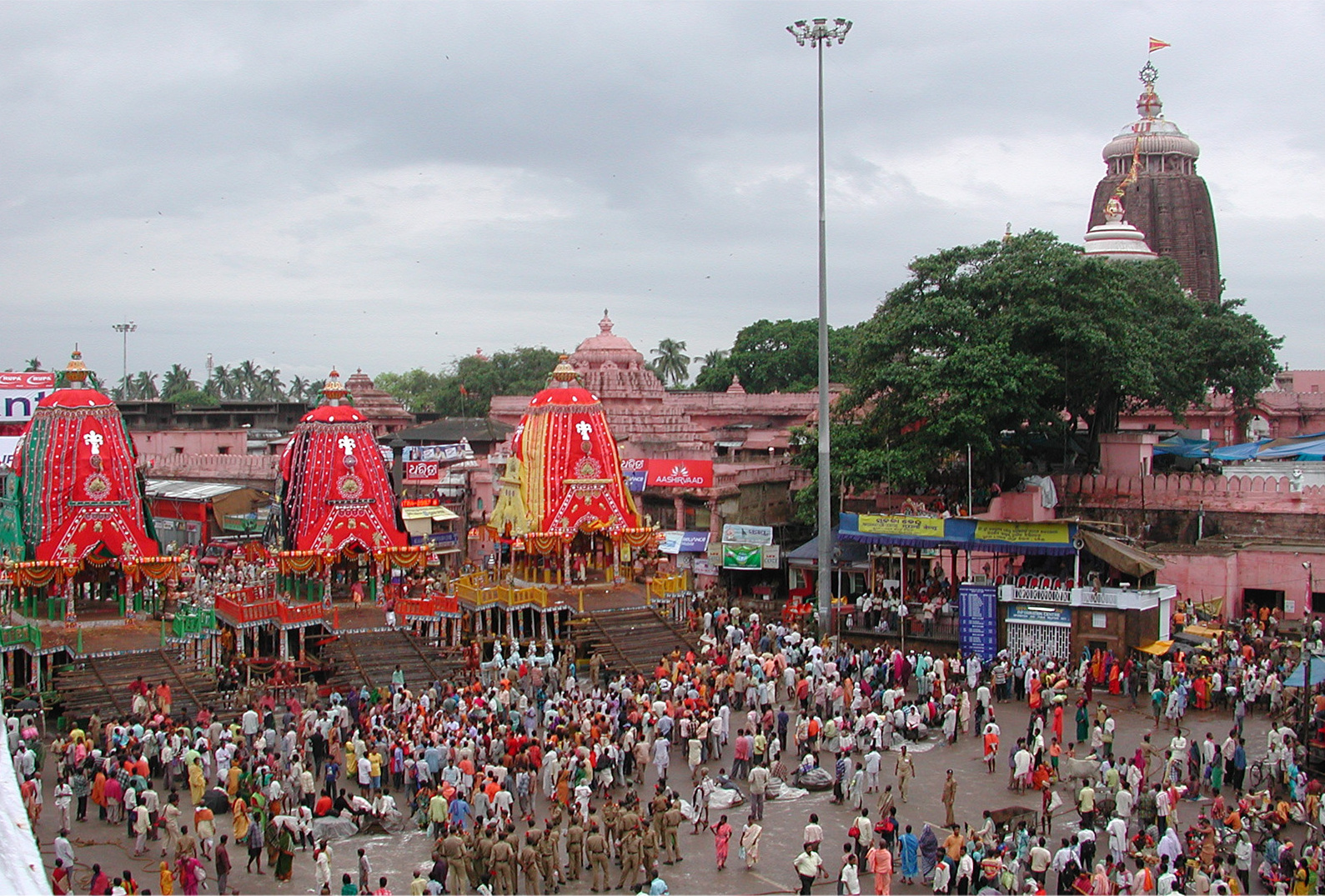
The Ratha Yatra in Puri in modern times, showing the three raths with the temple in the background

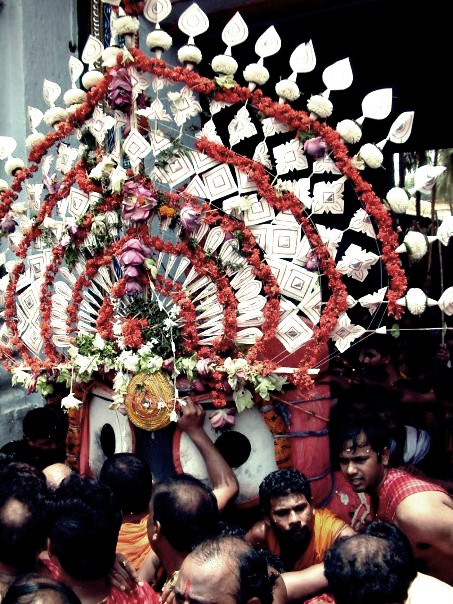
Pahandi Bije during the Ratha Yatra at Puri

The Jagannath triad is usually worshipped in the sanctum sanctorum of the Puri temple. However, during the month of Ashadha, the monsoon month that usually falls in June or July, the deities are brought out onto the Bada Danda (Grand Road) and taken in huge chariots (ratha) to the Gundicha Temple, about 3 km away, allowing the public to have the darshana, or the holy view, of the deities. This festival is known as Ratha Yatra, meaning the journey (yatra) of the chariots (raths). The rathas are large wheeled wooden structures that are newly constructed each year and are pulled by devotees using ropes. Jagannath's ratha is approximately 14 metres (45 ft) high and 11 metres (35 ft) wide, and requires about two months to build. The artists and painters of Puri decorate the chariots with painted flower petals and other motifs on the wheels, the wood-carved charioteer and horses, and the inverted lotuses on the panel behind the throne. The massive chariots of Jagannath pulled during Ratha Yatra are the etymological origin of the English word 'Juggernaut'. The Ratha Yatra is also known as Shri Gundicha Yatra.

The most significant ritual associated with the Ratha Yatra is the Chhera Pahara (literally, "sweeping with water"). During the festival, the Gajapati king dresses as a sweeper and ceremonially sweeps around the deities and their chariots. The king cleanses the road before the chariots with a gold-handled broom and sprinkles sandalwood water and powder with devotion. According to custom, although the Gajapati King is regarded as the most exalted person in the Kalinga kingdom, he still performs menial service to Jagannath. The ritual signifies that under the lordship of Jagannath, there is no distinction between the powerful sovereign and the most humble devotee.

Moreover, the ruling dynasty instituted the Ratha Yatra upon the completion of the great temple around 1150 CE. This festival was among the earliest Hindu festivals that was reported to the Western world. Odoric of Pordenone, a Franciscan friar from what is now Pordenone in Italy, visited India between 1316 and 1318, about twenty years after Marco Polo had dictated the account of his travels while imprisoned in Genoa. In his 1321 account, Odoric described how the people placed the deities on chariots, and how the king, queen and the populace drew them from the "church" accompanied by song and music.

=== Niladri Bije ===
Celebrated on Ashadha Trayodashi, Niladri Bije marks the concluding day of Ratha Yatra. On this day, the deities return to the Ratnabedi. At this point, Jagannath offers rasgulla to Goddess Lakshmi in order to reenter the temple.

=== Gupta Gundicha ===
It is celebrated for sixteen days from Krishna Dwitiya of the month of Ashwin to Vijayadashami. As per tradition, Madhava, along with Durga (known as Durgamadhaba) is taken on a procession around the temple premises. The procession within the temple is observed for the first eight days. During the following next eight days, the deities are carried outside the temple on a palanquin to the nearby Narayani Temple located in the Dola mandapa lane. After the rituals are completed, they are brought back to the temple.

=== Nabakalebara ===
Nabakalabera is a ritual associated with Jagannath, obsereved every eight, twelve or nineteen years, when one lunar month of Ashadha is followed by another. Meaning "new body", the ritual involves installation of new images in the Jagannath Temple and the burial of the old images at the temple at Koili Vaikuntha. The festival is attended by millions of people and its budget exceeds ₹41,000,000 (US$430,000). More than three million devotees are estimated to have visited the temple during the Nabakalevara of 2015, making it one of the most widely attended festivals in the world.

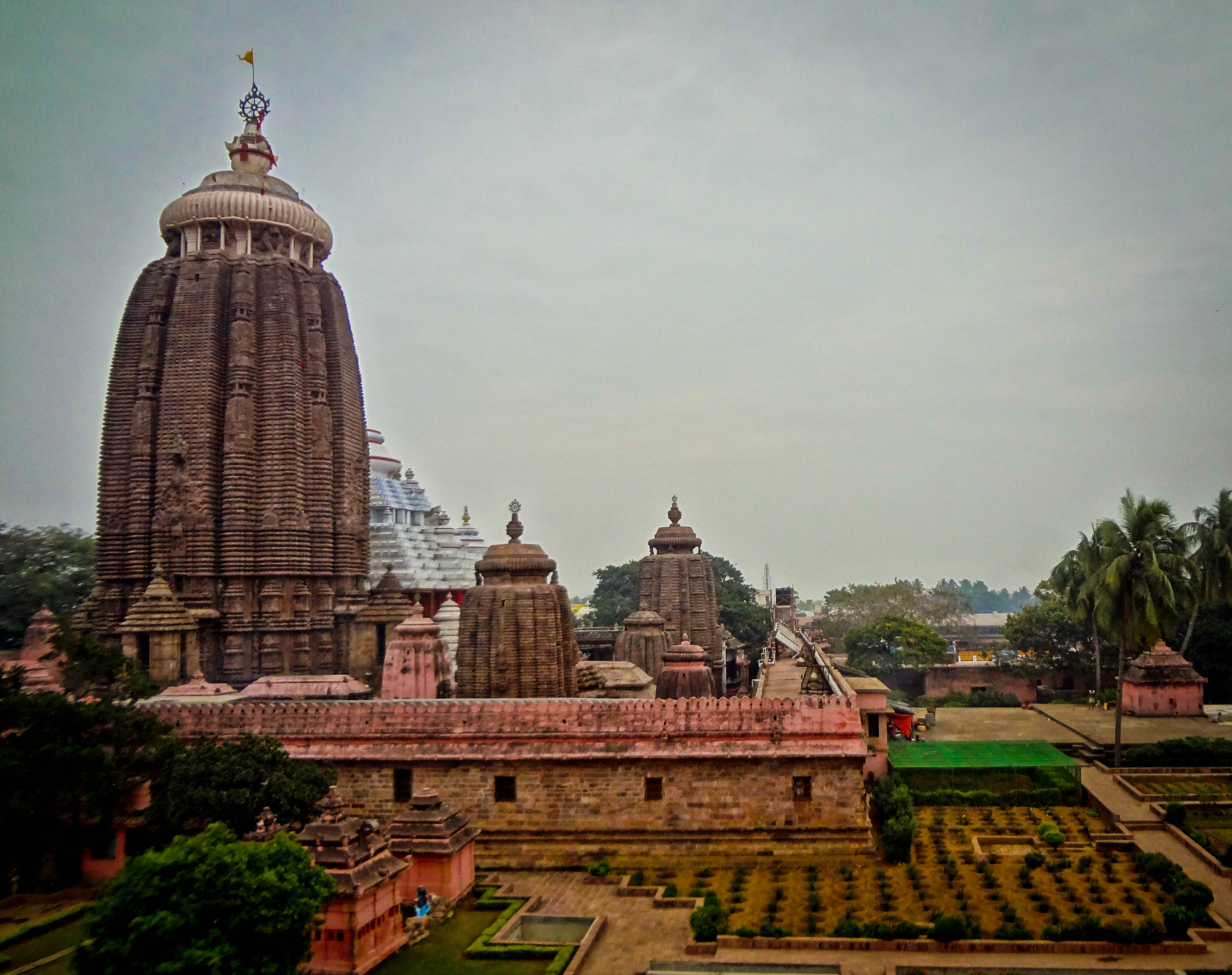
The backside of the Jagannath temple with the Koili Baikuntha garden in the foreground

== Security ==
The security at the temple has increased ahead of Ratha Yatra, the homecoming festival of the deities of Jagannath temple. In the wake of terror alert on 27 June 2012, the security forces were increased to ensure smooth functioning of the crowded Ratha Yatra and Suna Besha. As part of the modernisation of the temple premises and surroundings, the temple's security force has been further advanced, such as 44 police platoons with 30 police officers each, and 135 CCTV cameras with advanced face-scanning technology have been installed in the premises, to cater to more pilgrims and visitors and provide them with enhanced security. To enhance aerial security and prevent unauthorised drone flights, the Directorate General of Civil Aviation (DGCA) on 25 September 2025 declared a “Red Zone,” a more stringent category than the earlier “No‑Fly Zone” classification.

== Shree Jagannath Heritage Corridor ==
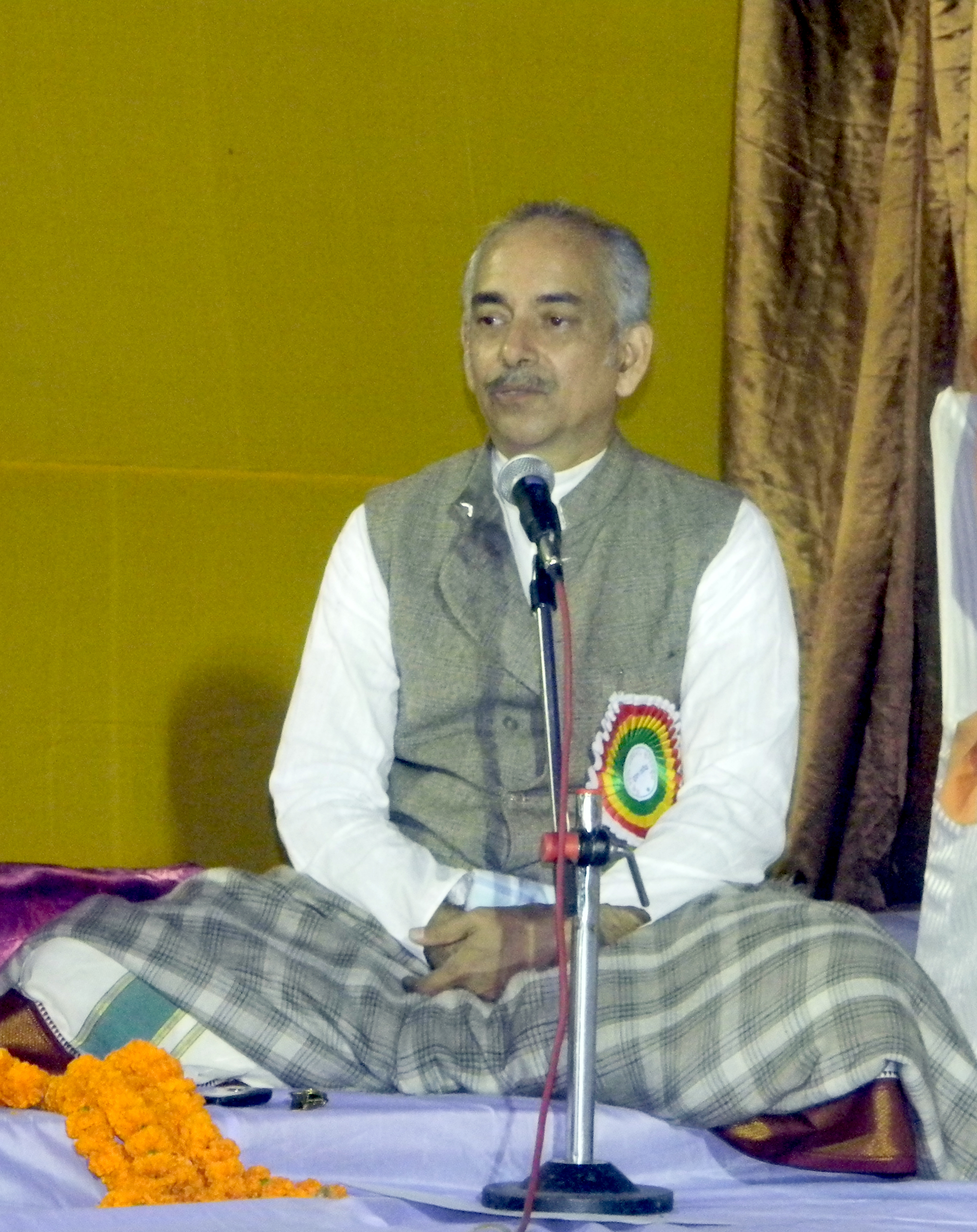
Shri Dibyasingha Deb, the incumbent Chief Servitor of the Temple

The Shree Mandir Parikrama, also known as the Shree Jagannath Heritage Corridor (SJHC), is a 75-metre-wide corridor surrounding the Jagannath temple. It was developed to create an expansive and unobstructed pathway around the Meghanad Pacheri, allowing devotees and pilgrims to have better view, darshan, of the Temple, Nila Chakra and Meghanad Pacheri. The project is conceptually similar to the Kashi Vishwanath Corridor that surrounds the Kashi Vishwanath Temple in Varanasi. The corridor provides a range of facilities and amenities to offer pilgrims and visitors a hassle-free experience while enhancing the safety and security of the temple and the devotees. Construction began after Chief Minister Naveen Patnaik and Dibyasingha Deba -the incumbent King of the Bhoi dynasty of Puri and the adhyasevak (chief servitor) of the Jagannath temple- laid the foundation stone in November 2021. The corridor was inaugurated and opened to the public by Chief Minister Naveen Patnaik and King Dibyasingha Deba on 17 January 2024.

== See also ==
- Jagannath Temple, Digha
- History of Odisha
- List of historic sites in Odisha
- Jagannath
- Indradyumna
- Char Dham
- Vaishnavism
- Chanakya
- Guru Nanak
- Kalinga architecture
- Gajapati Empire
- Dibyasingha Deba
- Archaeological Survey of India
- Shree Jagannath Heritage Corridor, Puri
- Konark Sun Temple
- Lingaraj Temple
- Kashi Vishwanath temple
- Chari Kshetra
- Sevayat
- Shri Jagannath Temple Managing Committee

== Notes ==
=== Bibliography ===
- Avinash Patra (2011). Origin & Antiquity of the Cult of Lord Jagannath. Oxford University Press.
- Das, J. P. (1982). Puri Paintings: The Chitrakara and His Work. Prafulla. ISBN 978-81-901589-7-8.
- Mahadev Chakravarti (1986). The Concept of Rudra-Śiva Through the Ages. Motilal Banarsidass. ISBN 978-81-208-0053-3.
- Norbert C. Brockman (2011). Encyclopedia of Sacred Places. California: ABC-CLIO. ISBN 978-1-59884-655-3.
- O. M. Starza (1993). The Jagannatha Temple at Puri: Its Architecture, Art, and Cult. BRILL. ISBN 90-04-09673-6.
- Partha Mitter (1992). Much Maligned Monsters: A History of European Reactions to Indian Art. University of Chicago Press. ISBN 978-0-226-53239-4.
- Paul Gwynne (2017). World Religions in Practice: A Comparative Introduction. Wiley. ISBN 978-1-118-97228-1.
- Suryanarayan Das (2010). Lord Jagannath. Sanbun. ISBN 978-93-80213-22-4.
