= Mukti Mandapa =

Coordinates: 19.804507°N 85.818010°E

There are many Mandapas or Pillared halls on raised platforms within the Jagannath Temple complex meant for religious congregations. The most prominent is the Mukti Mandapa the congregation hall of the holy seat of selected learned Brahmins.

== History ==
Mukti Mandapa is situated in front of the Adi Nrusingha Temple and by the southern side of the main Jagannatha Temple. The black granite platform is of five feet high. The area of the platform is nine hundred sq. ft. and it is square in shape. The platform is having a roof that is supported by twelve pillars around the circumference, with four pillars in the middle. The height of each pillar is eight feet and the roof of the platform is thirteen feet high from the ground level of the temple. Idols of different Gods and Goddesses are situated around the platform, including Sri Krisna, Lord Nrusimha, Lord Brahma, Durga and Ganesh. The pillars have been carved with artistic paintings.

== Cultural Importance ==
- All disputes among different groups of priests and other groups of people engaged in temple services are solved by the scholars of Mukti Mandapa Sabha. Not only Gajapati Maharaja or Sebakas i.e. people engaged in temple for religious rites but also common people seek the advice of Mukti Mandapa Sabha on disputes of religious and social nature.
- The yearly religious almanac popularly known as Panji, published by different publishers are submitted to Mukti Mandapa Sabha for their approval to authenticate specific dates of different religious rites.
- The committee of nine scholars as selected by other scholars of Mukti Mandapa Sabha is considered as the apex committee to take immediate decision during any conflict in the religious field and in the administration of Jagannath temple. During Nabakalebara, all rites pertaining to it are managed by the scholars of Mukti Mandapa Sabha.
