= Chandan Yatra =

Festival of Jagannath Temple, Puri

Chandana Yatra (Odia: ଚନ୍ଦନ ଯାତ୍ରା) also known as Gandhalepana yatra (Odia: ଗନ୍ଧଲେପନ ଯାତ୍ରା) is the longest festival observed at Jagannatha temple at Puri, India. Chandana Yatra meaning Sandalwood Voyage in Sanskrit, which continues for 42 days is observed in two parts: Bahara Chandana and Bhitara Chandana

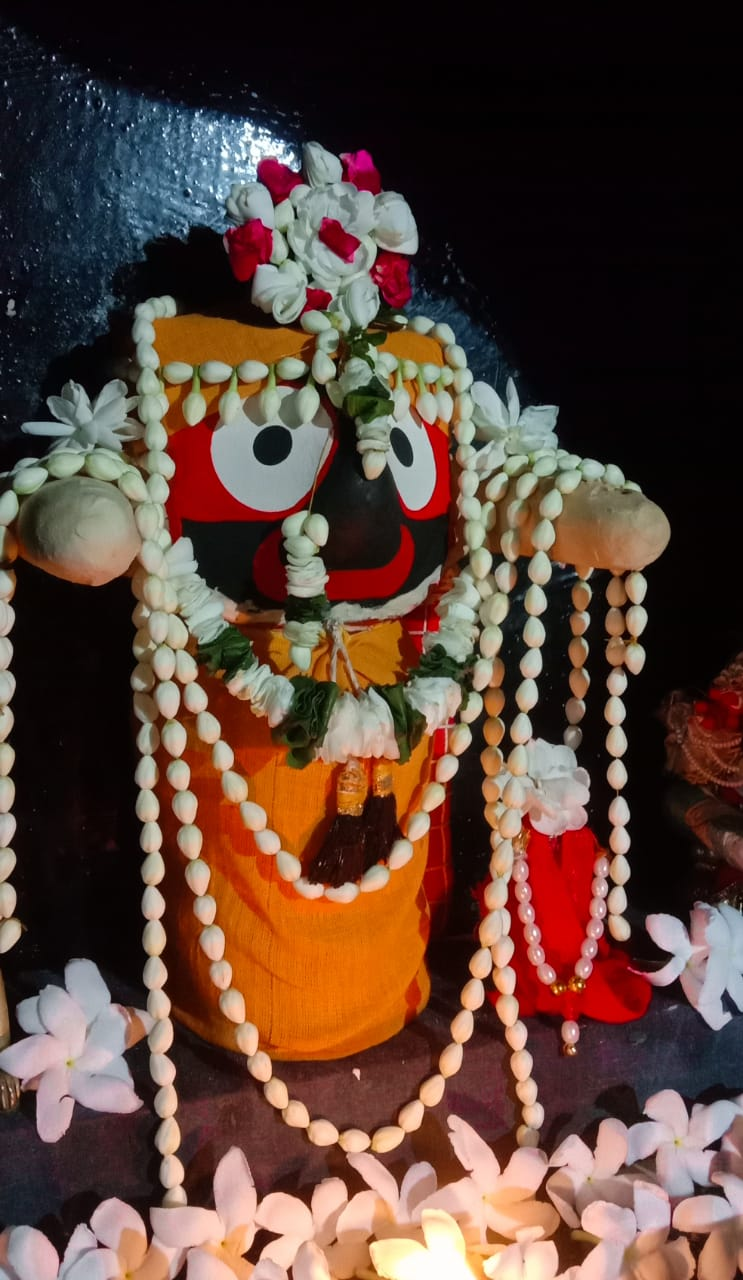
Chandana Besha of Jagannath

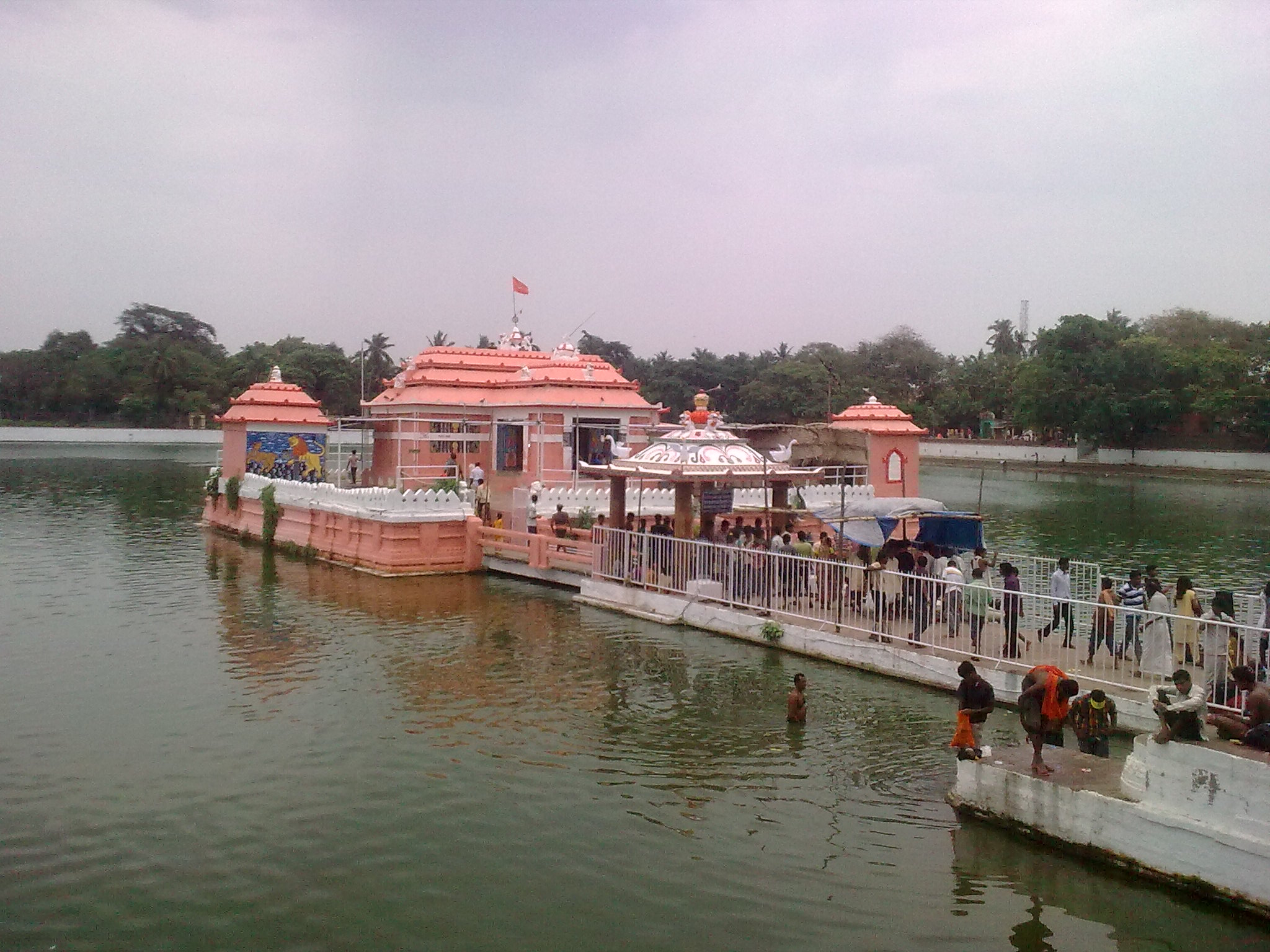
The Narendra Tirtha tank where ceremonies of Bahara Chandana are performed

== Bahara Chandana ==
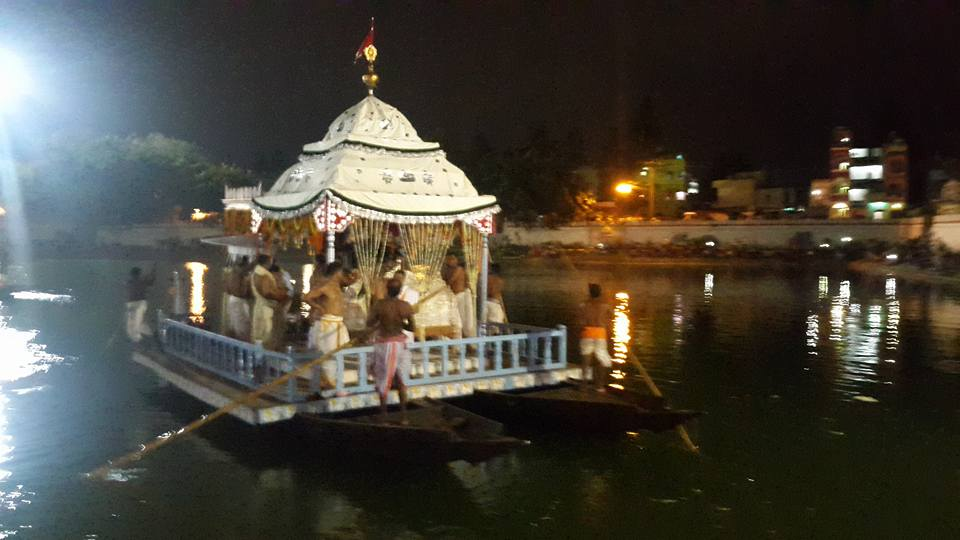
Decorated boat of the deities in Narendra tirtha

Bahara Chandana starts from Akshaya Tritiya and continues for 21 days. Construction of the chariots for the annual Ratha Yatra festival starts from Akshaya Tritiya.

On the first 21 days the representative idols of the main deities of the Jagannath temple as well as five shiva idols known as the Pancha Mahadeva or Pancha Pandava are taken in a procession from the Singhadwara or the Lion Gate of the Jagannatha temple at Puri to the Narendra Tirtha tank. The deities Madanamohana, Bhudevi, Sridevi and Rama(young Balabhadra) krishna (young krishna) participate in this yatra for 21 days. The deities are taken on two chapas (boats), namely, Nanda and Bhadra, on an excursion around the Narendra Tritha. After various rituals the deities are taken to the Narandra pond located near the Jagannath Temple and they are placed on grandly decorated boats for an evening cruise of the tank. As per rituals, Kotha Karana servitors of temple belonging to Karana community act as the protective force and security of Lord Jagannath accompanying the Lord in his journey with swords and knife.

== Bhitara Chandana ==
The last 21 days include rituals held inside the temple itself. Instead of the daily cruises, the playful ride happens here on four occasions, the Amavasya, the full moon night, on the Shashti and the Ekadashi of the bright fort night.

== See also ==
- Ratha Yatra
- Jagannath Temple, Puri
- Sevayat
