= Dvitiya =

Second day of a lunar fortnight in the Hindu calendar

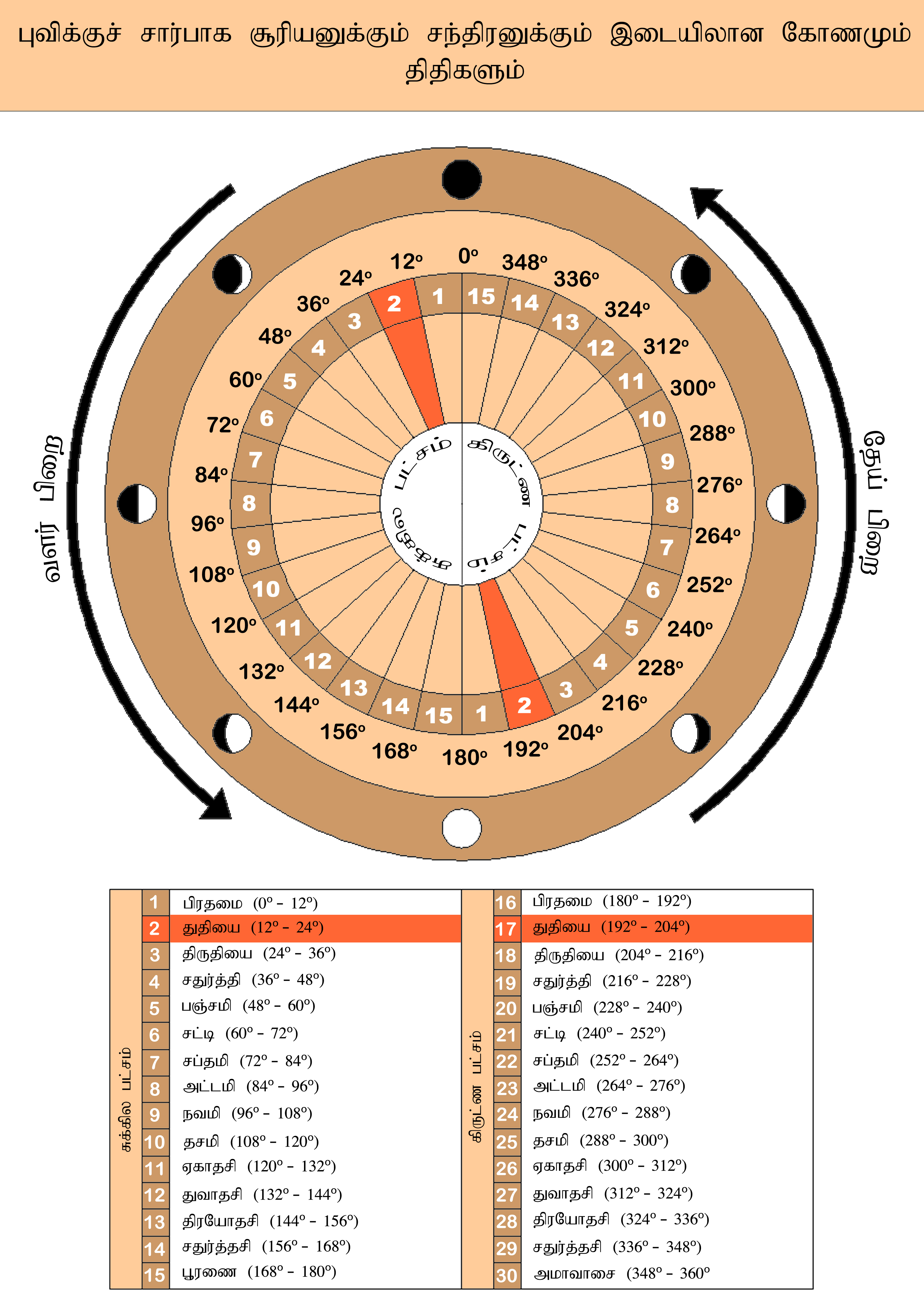
Dvitiya

Dvitiya (Sanskrit: द्वितीय, romanized: Dvitīya) also referred to as Beej (Sanskrit: बीज, romanized: Bīja) and Dooj (Sanskrit: दुजा, romanized: Dujā) is the Sanskrit word for "second", and is the second day of the lunar fortnight (Paksha) of the Hindu calendar. Each Hindu month has two dvitiya days, being the second day of the "bright" (Shukla) and of the "dark" (Krishna) fortnights respectively. Dvitiya occurs on the second and the seventeenth day of each month.

== Occasions ==
- Bhratri Dvitiya (Bhai Dooj/Bhau Beej), the last day of the Deepavali festival, occurs on the dvitiya of the month of Kartika.
- Phulerā Dooj/Dvitiya: It is celebrated on Shukla Paksha Dvitiya of Phalgun month and is quite popular in Braj region. This festival falls between two Hindu festivals commemorating spring season i.e. Vasanta Panchami and Holi. On this day holi is played using flowers. The Murtis of Hindu Devi-Devatas are decorated with flowers and flower canopy known as Phulera. As per Narada Purana, Lord Shiva is worshipped on this day with white colored fragrant flowers and an ornamental floral canopy is used for decorating His vigraha. On same day, in Radha Krishna temples vermillion are offered and flower holi is played in their remembrance.
- Ramdevpir-dooj or Ramdevpir-beej, the second day of Shukla paksha of Bhadra month is celebrated as the birthday of Ramdevji in northwestern India.
