= Govinda Vidyadhara =

Founder of the Bhoi Dynasty

- Gajapati; Suvarnakeshari; Vira Govinda Deva

Gajapati Emperor
- Reign: 1541 CE–1548 CE
- Coronation: 1541 CE
- Predecessor: Kakharua Deva
- Successor: Chakrapratapa
- House: Bhoi
- Religion: Hinduism

Govinda Vidyadhara was the founder of Bhoi Dynasty in Eastern India.

== Early life ==
He belonged to writer caste and came from a community of accountants or Bhoi. According to Historian KC. Panigrahi Bhoi rulers belonged to Karana caste. Historian Hermann Kulke while quoting KC. Panigrahi mentions the lineage of Govinda Vidyadhara's ancestors and their ancestral occupation, according to him Govinda Vidyadhara's ancestors were Karanas who were employed as writers in Gajapati Empire and had received land grants in Rajahmundry in Gajapati administration. Govinda Vidyadhara's younger son was also the founder of Peddapuram Zamindari of Andhra Pradesh. Kulke also mentions that there was an attempt made by later poets to connect the Bhoi rulers with other dynasties despite them being of writer caste lineage. Other historians like Ashirbadi Lal Srivastava, R. D. Banerji, and Francesco Brighenti have also affirmed that Bhoi rulers were of Karan (writer caste) descent. Govinda Vidyadhara had usurped the Gajapati throne by killing 16 sons or heirs of Prataparudra Deva through treachery and after ascending the throne he took the regnal title of "Suvarnakeshari" as per Madala Panji, his rule was short-lived that for seven years only followed by his son Chakrapratapa. Govinda Vidyadhara founded the Vira-Govindapur Sasana for Brahmins and his son Chakrapratapa was the founder of RaiChakrapur Sasana for Brahmins.

== Not recognised as Gajapati ==
After ascending the throne Govinda Vidyadhara was not recognised as Gajapati by the feudatory Gadajat states of Odisha as the rightful ruler as evident from his own "Jagamohana" inscription of Jagannath Temple, Puri in which he warned the feudatory states to stay loyal to him or else they will incur the wrath of Lord Jagannath for the sin of killing a Brahmana.

== Conflict with Golconda Sultanate ==
Immediately after ascending the throne Govinda Vidyadhara came into conflict with the Sultan of Golconda Sultanate who had invaded southern Odisha, Govinda Vidyadhara had to spend eight months in fighting the Sultan in southern Odisha meanwhile Raghu Bhanja Chhottaraya a nephew of Prataparudra Deva started a rebellion in North Odisha with the help of an individual named Abdul Shah and managed to capture Cuttack, Govinda Vidyadhara rushed back to his capital after hearing the news of rebellion and defeated Raghu Bhanja driving him out of Cuttack, Raghu Bhanja wanted to get revenge for the murder of the sons of Gajapati by capturing Cuttack.

== See also ==
- Ramachandra Deva I
- Bisara Mohanty
