= Dhenkanal State =

Princely state in Odisha, India

Coordinates: 20.67°N 85.6°E

Dhenkanal State ଢେଙ୍କାନାଳ
- Princely State of British India
- 1530–1948
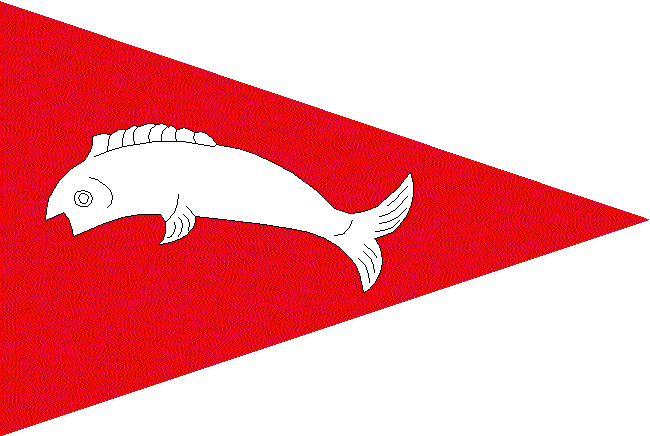
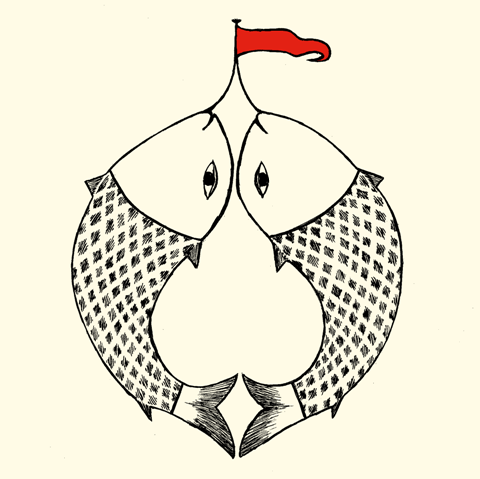
- Flag Coat of arms

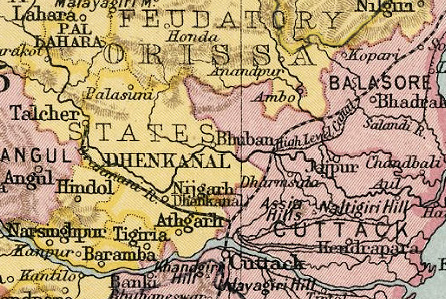
- Dhenkanal State in the Imperial Gazetteer of India
- Area
  - 1892: 3,789 km^{2} (1,463 sq mi)
- Population
  - 1892: 273,662
- History
  - Established: 1530
  - Accession to the Indian Union: 1948
Preceded by	Succeeded by
Gajapati Kingdom; Bhoi dynasty	India

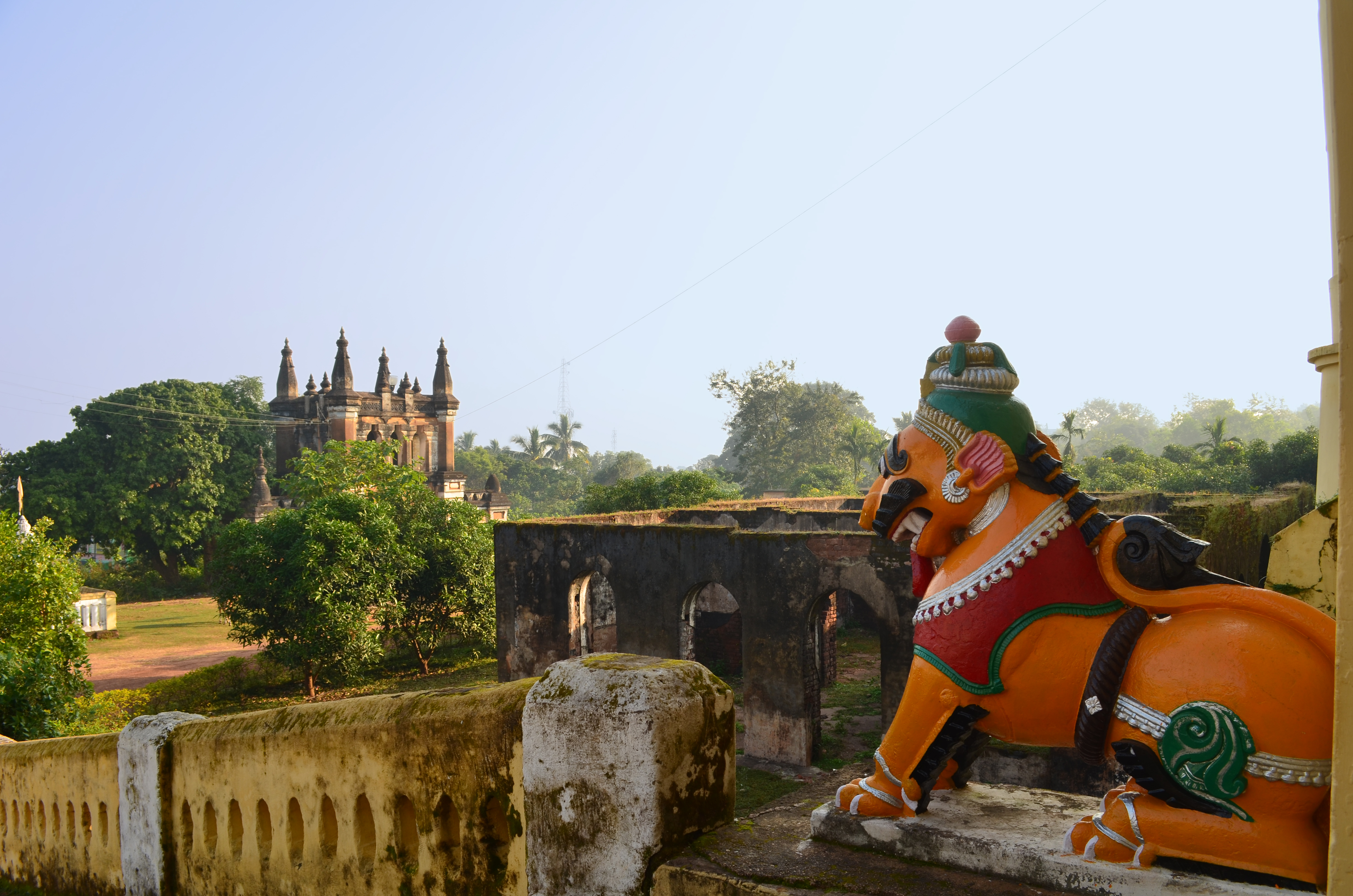
View of Dhenkanal Palace

Dhenkanal State was one of the princely states of India during the period of the British Raj. The area of the former state is now referred to as Dhenkanal district, Odisha, with Dhenkanal town as its district headquarters.Dhenkanal state was ruled by several rulers from the year 1530 to 1948, meaning an astounding 418 years.Dhenkanal state had the major parts of Dhenkanal, Angul and some parts of Keonjhar and southern areas.

== History ==
=== Foundation of Dhenkanal District ===
In 1530 CE, Dhenkanal is reported to have been a local tribal kingdom under the rule of Sabara. A campaign was launched by Harisingh Vidyadhara, commander and minister of the Gajapati Maharaja Prataparudra Deva, to bring it under the umbrage of the larger kingdom. Harisingh belonged to the Bhoi dynasty, whose brother Govinda Vidyadhara would later overthrow Prataparudra Deva's successors to become the Gajapati ruler of Odisha. Dhenkanal, situated 150 km north of Puri, was conquered by the Vidyadhara using a force of cavalry and foot soldiers in a battle between the Gajapati's army and the ruling chief. Vidyadhara was then appointed by Gajapati Maharaja as the Raja of Dhenkanal, becoming its hereditary ruler. The conquest brought the remote area under the control of the Gajapati Kingdom and strengthened it against further attacks. This laid the foundation of the Bhoi dynasty branch at Dhenkanal.

In the 18th century, the kingdom withstood the attack by the Maratha forces during the reign of Trilochana Deva. The events of the Maratha-Dhenakanal war of 1781 was also recorded in the ballad Samara Taranga by Brajanath Badajena. Raja Bhagirathi Pratap was a very popular and effective ruler, who was decorated with hereditary title of Mahindra Bahadur.

=== 20th century ===
Raja Sri Sura Pratap Singh Deo Mahindra Bahadur's eldest son, Prince Shankar Pratap, became Raja in the year 1926. He was young and still studying. Subsequently, he went to England to study Bar at Law. After his return to Dhenkanal, he put his mind to administration. Rajas of Dhenkanal maintained a military force of around 343 soldiers or Paikas (state militia) as sanctioned/restricted by the British administration/government for guard and escort duties or for appearance in other occasions.

While Raja Sri Shankar Pratap Singh Deo Mahindra Bahadur was in England, his younger brother, Pattayat Nrusingha Pratap Singh Deo was ruling over Dhenkanal. He built his 100-room palace at Jatan Nagar with forced labour. The labourers were tortured badly. Raja's Accountant also extracted money from common men. After all these incidents people expected an improved state of affairs after Raja Sri Shankar Pratap would return from abroad and take over administration from his younger brother.

=== Revolt ===
The revolt was organised and mobilized mainly by Harmohan Patnaik, who was the grandson of Dhenkanal Bebarta Jagannath Patnaik and Dewan Damodar Patnaik. Harmohan Patnaik formed the Dhenkanal Praja Mandal and was elected as its president. This was the first Praja Mandal of British India and then Praja Mandals sprang up in all princely states of India as public organizations to resist the practices of the then Rajas and Maharajas.

The Indian Imperial Police was mobilized by Raja Saheb to repress a revolt. A young boy named Baji Rout refused to ferry police officers using his boat. The police then opened fire and killed Baji Rout and five villagers. This incident inflamed the nearby villagers and the revolt spread to the entire Dhenkanal State.

The Praja Mandal movement mobilized mass gatherings and a charter of rights was drawn. During the years of struggle, the Indian National Congress also became associated with the Dhenkanal movement. Arrests and imprisonments were a regular occurrence. Whenever Raja Saheb's forces imprisoned Harmohan Patnaik, the people surrounded the Palace in great numbers. Raja Saheb felt threatened and released Harmohan Patnaik unconditionally.

=== Independence of India ===
The independence of India in the year 1947 put a stop to the unrest. Raja Sri Shankar Pratap Singh Deo Mahindra Bahadur accepted Harmohan Patnaik as an adviser. Subsequently, princely states were taken over and Rajas and Maharajas were deposed. Raja Sri Shankar Pratap was elected as Member of newly formed Odisha Legislative Assembly. Ranee Smt. Ratna Prabha Devi was an M.L.A. for two terms. Raja Sri Shankar Pratap's son, Brigadier Kamakhya Prasad Singh Deo, became a Member of Indian Parliament and a Minister in the Government of India's cabinet. He was the President of Orissa Pradesh Congress Committee.

== Rulers ==
List of rulers of the Dhenkanal princely state of the Bhoi dynasty branch:

- Harisingh Vidyadhara (1530–1594)
- Loknath Ray Singh Bharamarbar (1594–1615)
- Balabhadra Ray Singh (1615–1641)
- Nilakantha Ray Singh (1641–1682)
- Nrusingh Bhramarbar (1682–1708)
- Kunja Behari Bhramarbar (1708–1728)
- Braja Behari Bhramarbar (1728–1741)
- Damodar Bhramarbar (1741–1743)
- Trilochana Deva Mahendra Bahadur (1743–1785)
- Dayanidhi Mahendra Bahadur (1785–1796)
- Ramchandra Mahendra Bahadur (1796–1807)
- Krishna Chandra Mahendra Bahadur (1807–1822)
- Shyam Chandra Mahendra Bahadur (1822–1830)
- Bhagiratha Mahendra Bahadur (1830–1873)
- Pitambar Deo (1873–1877)
- Dinabhandu Mahendra Bahadur (1877–1885)
- Surya Pratap Mahendra Bahadur (29 August 1885 – 16 October 1918)
- Shankar Pratap Singh Dev Mahendra (16 October 1918 – 1 January 1948)

=== Titular ===
- Shankar Pratap Singh Dev Mahendra (1 January 1948 – 3 August 1965)
- Kamakhya Prasad Singh Deo Mahindra Bahadur (born 3 August 1965)

== See also ==
- Eastern States Agency
- Eastern States Union
- Political integration of India
