= Bisara Mohanty =

15th century historical figure from Odisha and a Devotee of Jagannath

- ବିସର ମହାନ୍ତି
- Born: c. 1530s Odisha, India
- Died: 16th century Kujanga, Odisha, India
- Citizenship: Gajapati Empire
- Occupations: Scribe, record writer, Vaishnava devotee
- Era: 16th century
- Known for: Rescuing and preserving the Brahma Padartha (divine soul) of Lord Jagannath during the 1568 Afghan invasion
- Title: Nayaka

Bisara Mohanty (Odia: ବିସର ମହାନ୍ତି) was a devotee and historical figure of Jagannath culture, who rescued Brahma Padartha of Lord Jagannath from the river Ganga. He was a contemporary of Gajapati Ramachandra Deva I of Bhoi dynasty.

== Historical context ==
There was a time when the Bengal Sultan's general Kalapahad invaded the Jagannath Temple of Puri, during this time the chief temple superintendent or Royal Priest of Jagannath temple was Parichha Dibyasingh Pattanaik, he made an attempt to hide the idols of Lord Jagannath near Chilika Lake however his efforts were futile and Kalapahad was able to determine the location of the deities with the help of a traitor named Danpahanta Singh thus Kalapahad took the idol of Lord Jagannath to destroy it. When he tried to burn the idol, he found a part of the idol, called Brahma Padartha, difficult to burn. He threw the remaining part into the river of Ganga. Bisara Mohanty a Vaishnav Karan, followed Kalapahad with the idol from Orissa to Bengal, floated down the stream and rescued the Brahma Padartha. He put it inside a mridangam (drum) and secretly brought it to his village Kujang. There he continued worshipping the Brahma Padartha with simple offerings. Gajapati Ramachandra Deva of Bhoi dynasty, a new ruler, received a directive from Lord Jagannath in his dream and sent his eldest son Padmanava Pattanaik to Kujang to claim the remains, Padmanav Pattanaik fabricated the new idols of the gods in which the Daru Brahma could reside and performed Nabakalebara in Khordha and carried the newly formed idols to Puri as per the directive of his father. After the renovation of the Jagannath Temple, Puri, Ramachandra Deva placed the idols in the temple. He acknowledged Bisara Mohanty's role and gave him the position of Nayaka (chief) of the Purushottama Kshetra (Puri).

== Background and early life ==
Mohanty spent much of his time engaged in Naam Sankirtan (devotional chanting) and associating with temple servitors (Sevayats) from Puri. In her biographical text Bhakta Bisar Mohanty, Odia novelist Kanakalata Mohanty links his ancestry to Jajpur, characterizing him as a descendant of Bandhu Mohanty—another celebrated, historic devotee of Lord Jagannath. Though contemporary observers often misjudged his ecstatic, devotional absorption as madness, his resolve proved critical during the collapse of the Gajapati kingdom.

== The 1568 invasion and rescue ==
In 1568 CE, the independent sovereign state of Odisha collapsed following the defeat and assassination of King Mukunda Deva by the forces of Sultan Sulaiman Khan Karrani. The Sultan's general, Kalapahad, launched a targeted assault on the Jagannath Temple in Puri to plunder its treasury and dismantle the socio-religious anchor of the Odia people. Foreseeing the danger, the chief temple superintendent of Jagannath Temple, Paricha Dibyasingha Pattanaik, along with other priests, hastily evacuated the large wooden idols of Jagannath, Balabhadra, and Subhadra, partially burying them near the secluded coast of Kujanga. However, Kalapahad tracked down the hiding spot with the help of a traitor, unearthed the idols, loaded them onto elephants, and marched them to the banks of the Ganga (Hooghly River) in Bengal to be publicly incinerated.

Knowing that the physical idols were destructible wood but housed the absolute, immortal life core—the Brahma Padartha—Bisara Mohanty tracked the advancing Afghan military division in tight disguise. He traveled as a wandering musician, slinging a traditional barrel drum (a mridanga or dhola) across his shoulders.

When Kalapahad's soldiers set the idols ablaze on the riverbanks and departed, assuming the deities were permanently reduced to ash, Mohanty quietly emerged from hiding. He extinguished the embers with river water and searched the charred remains. He discovered that the sacred navel-center core (the Navi Brahma) had completely resisted the fire. Mohanty wrapped the relic securely, hollowed out the inner structure of his drum, and concealed the divine core inside it. He then walked hundreds of miles backward through heavily patrolled enemy territory, swampy terrain, and dense jungles to return safely to Odisha.

== Preservation at Kujangagarh ==
Upon returning to his native region, Mohanty sought a safe haven for the relic. Guided by a spiritual vision, he reached out to Ananta Narendra Samant, the local Raja of Kujanga. To maintain complete operational secrecy from Islamic administrators and local spies, the King did not immediately attempt to return the relic to Puri. Instead, they commissioned a new neem-wood replica deity known as Kunja Bihari. The salvaged Brahma Padartha was secretly installed inside this idol at the fort temple of Kujangagarh, where confidential daily worship was sustained for nearly a decade. Because of the ongoing turmoil, the annual Rath Yatra festival in Puri remained entirely suspended for approximately nine years (1568–1577 CE).

== Legacy and restoration ==
The preservation of the relic by Mohanty provided the direct ritual foundation for the resurrection of the Jagannath cult. In the late 1570s, Gajapati Ramachandra Deva I established the Bhoi dynasty at Khurda and sought to legitimize his sovereign status by reviving the state religion. Learning of the relic's survival in a dream as per Chakada Pothi, Gajapati Ramachandra Deva I sent his eldest son Padmanava Pattanaik to Kujanga, Padmanava ceremonially retrieved the Brahma Padartha, and brought it back to Khurda along with Bisara Mohanty and performed the first Nabakalebara ritual at Barunei fort of Khurda.

Historian Hermann Kulke mentions that in recognition of Bisara Mohanty’s unmatched courage and service to the state, Gajapati Ramachandra Deva I honored Bisara Mohanty with the hereditary state title of Nayaka or Chief of Puri while Gajapati Ramachandra Deva was honoured by the priests as the ‘Second Indradyumna’ the King who originally built the temple in Satya Yuga as per Hindu scriptures like Skanda Purana for his renovating activities for the temple and reviving the Jagannath cult. In modern Odisha, Mohanty is celebrated as a symbol of cultural resilience and absolute devotion. His historical feat is recorded in the official temple chronicle, the Madala Panji, and remains a popular theme in Odia devotional poetry, literature, and performing arts.

== See also ==
- Nabakalebara
- Ramachandra Deva I
