= Ramachandra Deva I =

Ruler of Odisha (r. 1568-1607)

- Gajapati; Abhinava Indradyumna

King of Khurda
- Reign: 1568 CE – 1607 CE
- Coronation: 1575 CE
- Predecessor: Mukunda Deva
- Successor: Purushottama Deva II
- Died: Khurda
- House: Bhoi
- Father: Danai Vidyadhara (Karana Rajya lekhak/court scribe from Karana community)
- Religion: Hinduism

Gajapati Rāmachandra Deva I (1568–1607; popularly called Abhinava Indradyumna) was the founder of the Bhoi dynasty of Khurda in Odisha, India. He established the Khurda kingdom in 1568 and after the death of Mukunda Deva he made an alliance with Akbar and was recognised as Gajapati. Madala Panji associated him with Yaduvamsa of Mahabharata. Gajapati Ramachandra Deva was also a Sanskrit poet and a scholar, he authored the celebrated drama "Shrikrushnabhaktabachhalya Charitam". The Odia populace gave him the title of "Thakura Raja" as a mark of respect for renovating the damaged Hindu temples that were destroyed by the invasion of Kalapahad. Ramachandra Deva's regnal title was "Vira Sri Gajapati Viradhi Viravara Pratapi Ramachandra Deva".

== Early life ==
Ramachandra Deva was the son of Danai Vidyadhara, a lieutenant of Bhoi king Govinda Vidyadhara. Historian Hermann Kulke while quoting “Katakarajavamshavali” mentions that Ramachandra Deva’s father was known as “Vira Behara” who was a prominent member of Karana community serving as a scribe in the court had three sons eldest of whom was Gajapati Ramachandra Deva who became the King of Odisha while the other two sons are mentioned as Vidyadhara Das and Chakudi Ray. Vidyadhara Das ruled Bhubaneswar after eliminating the local Chiefs and Chakudi Ray ruled Patia. According to historian K.C Panigrahi, Ramachandra Deva's family belonged to Karana community however Madala Panji associated him with Yaduvamsa to raise his status in the eyes of the Mughal general Man Singh to legitimise his claim over the kingship of Khurda and Puri. Ramachandra Deva was the Raja of Khurda kingdom and after the death of Mukunda Deva, Ramachandra Deva became "Gajapati". Ferishta mentioned him as "a Prince of great fame and Power". As Kharavela was the morning star when the forward march of the Odias began, Ramachandra Deva was the midnight star, he came to the throne when complete darkness engulfed the people towards the end of the century. Ramachandra Deva's eldest son was Padmanav Pattanaik, Padmanav Pattanaik played an instrumental role in retrieving the Brahma Padartha of Lord Jagannath from Bisara Mohanty of Kujang Garh.

== Administration ==
Due to the sustained invasion of Afghans over Orissa, Ramachandra Deva accepted the suzerainty of Akbar through Man Singh I of Amer and defeated them with Mughal support. The Mughals took control over Orissa and Ramachandra Deva continued as a subordinate king. In the settlement of 1592, Ramachandra Deva was granted the principality of Khurda by the Mughal emperor. His territory was called Qila Khurda, alienated from the Khalisa and its domain extended from the river Mahanadi to Ganjam. The 31 subordinate Zamindars in his control including all the later tributary Mahalas of Cuttack and south of the river Mahanadi and seven principal Zamindars, which were not styled or titled Rajas. These important chiefs were the zamindars of Keonjhar, Mayurbhanj, Bishnupur, Fatehbad, Narayangarh, Karrangarh and Nag or Bagbhum.

== Reign ==
The invasion of Kalapahad brought an immense loss of wealth that was stored in various ancient temples of the region. The reconstruction of these temples was promptly taken up by Ramachandra Deva. He was able to present himself as the successor to the culture and tradition of the former Gajapati kings. He renovated the Jagannath Temple in Puri and reinstalled the idols of the trinity by droving out the muslim forces from the city in 1575 A.D. He continued the Gundicha Yatra, eight years after the installation of the deities, which was discontinued after the destruction caused by Kalapahad.

For his remarkable work, the king was popularly known as the Second Indradymna or Abhinava Indradyumna, which is an honorable comparison to the legendary founder of the temple, Maharaja Indradyumna. He established sixteen villages of Brahmins by giving endowments of land and established some forts in the Pipili area - Bhuinmul, Sahajpal, Kharagarh and Kahnan, which are identified with the present Bhuinmulgarh, Sahajpani, Aragarh and Garh Kurki respectively.

== Amusement ==
The rulers like Kapilendra Deva, Purushottama Deva, Prataparudra Deva of Suryavansha dynasty and Ramachandra Deva of Bhoi dynasty patronised art and music in Orissa. During his reign classical music, dance and other forms of art reached an apex. In his reign, the young boys were dressed as girls and performed under the guide of Odissi, called the Gotipua Nrutya. Devadasis were originally intended for temple service only but during the time of Ramachandra Deva they were engaged in providing entertainment to the royal court.

== See also ==
- Bisara Mohanty
- Indradyumna
- Nabakalebara
