= Gajapati (title) =

Regnal title from Odisha, India

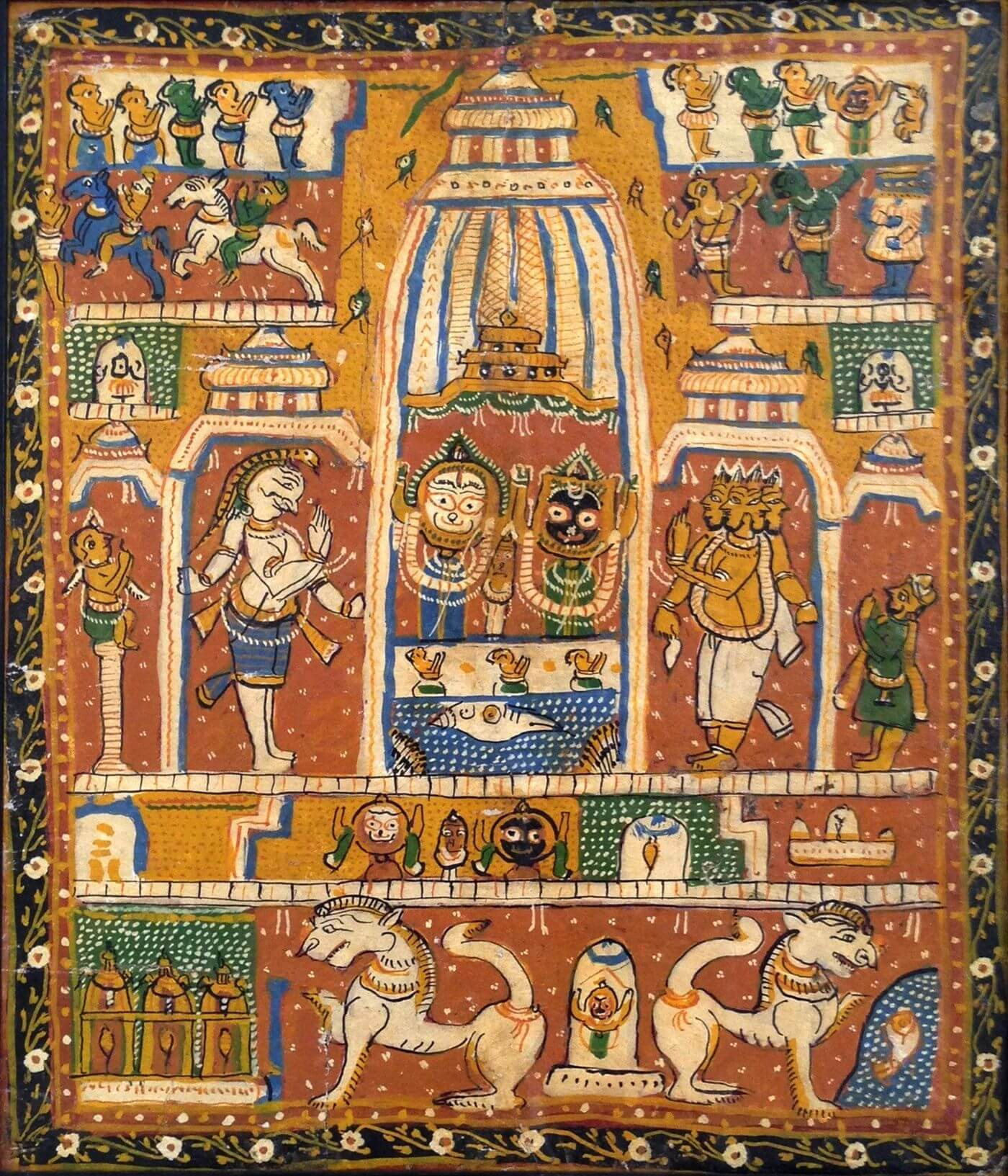
The Jagannath Temple deities

Gajapati is a regnal title from the region of modern Odisha in the Indian subcontinent. The word 'Gajapati' in Odia refers to "Gaja" meaning elephant and "Pati" meaning master or lord. Thus Gajapati etymologically means a lord with an army of elephants. The institution of Gajapati lordship as a title was used by the Eastern Ganga dynasty and was used by succeeding dynasties, as Gajapati dynasties, with the patronisation of Lord Jagannath as the deity of the Odia cultural realm. Four ruling dynasties have been part of Gajapati lordship or dynasties.

The current titular Gajapati belongs to the head of the Bhoi dynasty, as the dynasty inherited the legacy of the historical ruling lords of Odisha invested in the title of Gajapati. They also exercised administrative control of the Jagannath Temple at Puri.

== History ==
The ruling lords of Kalinga, Utkala and Dakshina Kosala used various regnal titles upon coronation or conquest of regions, chiefly being the titles of Kalingadhipati and Tri-Kalingadhipati. Anantavarman Vajrahasta V assumed the titles as Trikalingadhipati (lord of the three Kalingas) and Sakalakalingadhipati (lord of complete Kalinga) challenging the authority of the Somavanshis and eventually laying the foundations for the Eastern Ganga dynasty as the unification of the Odia kingdoms eventually culminated under Anantavarman Chodaganga.

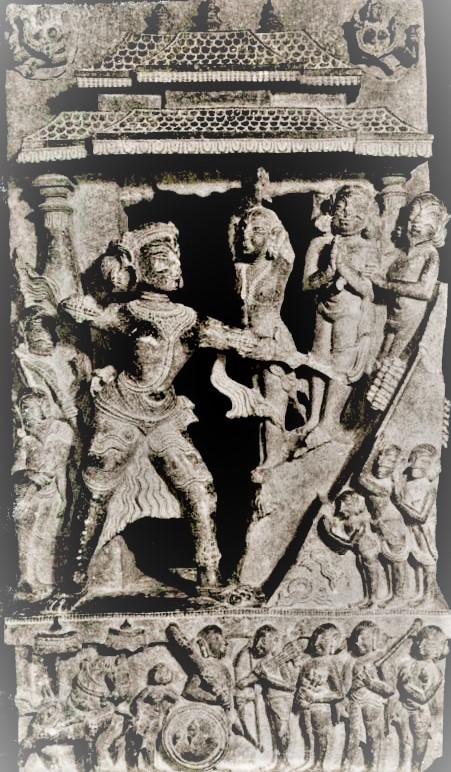
Narasingha Deva I, the first Gajapati monarch (1246 CE)

Narasingha Deva I was the first ruler from the Eastern Ganga dynasty to use the title of Gajapati among the Odishan rulers in the 1246 CE inscription at the Kapilash Temple.

Anangabhima Deva III laid the foundations of the Gajapati institution and establishment of Lord Jagannath as the patron deity of the realm. His son Narasingha Deva I was the first ruler from the Eastern Ganga dynasty to use the title of Gajapati among the Odishan rulers in the 1246 CE inscription at the Kapilash Temple. The Gajapati monarchs were devout worshipper of Lord Jagannath and patronized the Vaishnavite Hinduism with the Jagannath temple at Puri becoming the major religious hub of the Gajapati rule.

=== Events ===
- Eastern Ganga monarch Narasingha Deva I institutes the Gajapati title in 1246 CE
  - Eastern Ganga reign till 1434 CE
  - Coronation of Kapilendra Deva in 1434 CE
    - Suryavamsa dynasty reign till 1541 CE
    - Govinda Vidyadhara usurps the throne in 1541 CE
      - Bhoi dynasty 1st reign till 1560 CE
      - Mukunda Deva of Eastern Chalukya usurps the throne in 1560 CE
        - Mukunda Deva is overthrown during the Bengal Sultanate invasions in 1568 CE
    - Ramachandra Deva I restores the Bhoi dynasty at Khurda in 1568 CE
      - Coronation of Ramachandra Deva I as the Gajapati in 1575 CE
        - Bhoi dynasty becomes the incumbent holder of Gajapati dynasty and institutions
        - Reign of the Bhois over Khurda Kingdom till 1804 CE
          - Establishment of the Puri Estate in 1809 CE during British rule and control of Jagannath Temple
            - Indian independence in 1947 and titular institutions

== Gajapati dynasties ==
The Gajapati dynasty refers to the ruling dynasty from the region of modern Odisha in the Indian subcontinent, whose monarch carries the regnal title of Gajapati. The institution of Gajapati dynasty or lordship was founded by the monarchs of the Eastern Ganga dynasty and was used by the succeeding dynasties. A major religious function included the patronisation of Lord Jagannath as the deity of the Odia cultural realm.

Till date, four ruling dynasties from the region of Odisha have presided over the institution of Gajapati dynasty. The current titular Gajapati belongs to the head of the Bhoi dynasty, which the dynasty had inherited the legacy of the historical ruling lords of Odisha invested in the title of Gajapati. They also exercised administrative control of the Jagannath Temple at Puri.

Gajapati dynasty	Reign	Notes
Eastern Ganga dynasty	1246–1434	Gajapati lordship initiated in 1246
Suryavamsa dynasty	1434–1541	
Bhoi dynasty	1541–1560	1st reign
Chalukya dynasty	1560–1568	
Bhoi dynasty	1568–present	2nd reign, titular since 1947

== Modern ceremonial titles ==
The ceremonial regnal title of the Gajapati Maharaja is as follows:

Shree Shree Shree Veerashree Gajapati Goudeswar Nabakotikarnata Kalabaragesvara Viradhiviravar Bhuta Vairaba Sadhu Sasnotirna Routraja Atula Balaparakrama Sahasra Bahu Kshetriya kula Dhumaketu Maharaja Adhiraja (regnal name)

=== Customary title of Gajapati upon accession ===
The cyclical order the names of the Gajapati Maharaja:

- Ramchandra Deva
- Birakeshari Deva
- Divyasingha Deva
- Mukunda Deva

=== Customary title of the ladies of Gajapati upon accession ===
- Chandramani Patamahadei
- Suryamani Patamahadei
- Leelavati Patamahadei
- Padmabati Patamahadei

== List of Gajapatis of the ruling dynasties ==
Ruler	Reign	Notes
Eastern Ganga dynasty
Narasingha Deva I	1246–1263	Initiation of Gajapati title in 1246, reign since 1238
Bhanudeva I	1264–1279	
Narasimhadeva II	1279–1306	
Bhanudeva II	1306–1328	
Narasimhadeva III	1328–1352	
Bhanudeva III	1352–1378	
Narasimhadeva IV	1378–1414	
Bhanudeva IV	1414–1434	
Suryavamsa dynasty
Kapilendra Deva	1434–1470	
Purushottama Deva	1470–1497	
Prataparudra Deva	1497–1540	
Kalua Deva	1540–1541	
Kakharua Deva	1541	
Bhoi dynasty (1st reign)
Govinda Vidyadhara	1541–1548	
Chakrapratapa	1548–1557	
Narasimha Jena	1557–1558	
Raghuram Chhotaraya	1558–1560	
Chalukya dynasty
Mukunda Deva	1560–1568	
Bhoi dynasty (2nd reign)
Ramachandra Deva I	1568–1600	founder of the Khurda Kingdom
Purusottam Deva	1600–1621	
Narasingha Deva	1621–1647	
Balabhadra Deva	1647–1657	
Mukunda Deva I	1657–1689	
Divyasingha Deva I	1689–1716	
Harekrushna Deva	1716–1720	
Gopinath Deva	1720–1727	
Ramachandra Deva II	1727–1736	
Birakesari Deva I (Bhagirathi Deva)	1736–1793	
Divyasingha Deva II	1793–1798	
Mukundeva Deva II	1798–1817	Puri Estate in 1809
Ramchandra Deva III	1817–1854	
Birakesari Deva II	1854–1859	
Divyasingha Deva III	1859–1882	
Mukundeva Deva III	1882–1926	
Ramchandra Deva IV	1926–1956	Pretender since 1947 (Indian independence)
Birakisore Deva III	1956–1970	Pretender
Divyasingha Deva IV	1970–current	Pretender
