= Madala Panji =

Chronicle of the Jagannath Temple

The Madala Panji is a chronicle of the Jagannath Temple, Puri, Odisha, India. It describes the historical events of Odisha related to Lord Jagannath and the Jagannath Temple. The Madala Panji dates from the 12th century. However other scholars like Harekrushna Mahatab, Krishna Chandra Panigrahi, Nilakantha Das etc. date it to 16th century with its writing commencing during the reign of Ramachandra Deva I of Bhoi dynasty who used panji as a proof of succession over the throne of Odisha.

== Madala Panji's role in Odia history ==
The Madala Panji was traditionally written on a year-to-year basis on Vijaya-Dashami day by the Karanas (official history writers of Puri, a caste of Odisha, involved in keeping the chronicle). This ritual is cited as a proof that the tradition of keeping this chronicle began with Odia king Anantavarman Chodaganga Dev (1078–1150) himself. There are some, like Dr. Harekrushna Mahatab, Dr.Nilakantha Dash and Dr. Krushna Chandra Panigrahi who hold that the Panji dates from the reign of Ramachandra Deva I who re-established the worship of Lord Jagannatha after Kalapahad said to have destroyed it. The arguments are complex, but it is likely that much of the early record was indeed lost in the period that followed Kala Pahad and was rewritten in a fashion that mixed legend with history. In 1926 a researcher named Ram Prasad Chand arrived in Puri and collected copies of the Madala Panji from Deula Karana Gauranga Charan Samantaray, as per his inspection Panji dates from the reign of Ramachandra Deva I.

== Writers of Panji ==
According to the tradition, Anantavarman Chodaganga created 24 families of Karanas to preserve the temple records. Of these, five were entrusted with the writing and preservation of the Madala Panji. They are:

- Panjia Karan—preserves the Madala Panji
- Tadau Karan—writes the Madala Panji
- Deula Karan—enforces the Madala
- Kotha Karan—the main compiler
- Baithi Karan – assistant

== Classification ==
In subsequent stage, due to the bulky size of Madala Panji, its content covering different dimensions related to temple management, it was divided into four parts:

1. Bhandara Khanja Madala (maintained by Pattajoshi Mohapatra)
2. Deula Madala / Karmangi Madala (maintained by Deula Karana)
3. Deshapanji Madala (prepared by Deula Karana)
4. Rajakhanja Madala (prepared and maintained by Tadhau Karana),

== Types of Panjis ==
There are also five different categories of Panjis. No one has seen them all.

- Raja Khanja—important events of the Rajas. Read on Paush Purnima (Pushyabhishek). Kept by Tadau Karan.
- Desh Khanja—Records gifts of land and money and occasions when the Jagannath temple was plundered. Kept by Kotha Karan.
- Karmangi. Daily rituals. Important events related to the rituals recorded. Announced daily at the Beherana.
- Dina Panji—The daily almanac read by the temple astrologer at the time of the Avakash. These were prepared annually and finalized on Vishuva Sankranti.

Besides the Madala, there were other Karans who wrote regional chronicles, known as Chakadas. "All the Kadatas and Chakadas taken together will be about a cartload."

== Madala Panji in recent years ==
Madala Panji language is Odia and was recorded in Odia and Telugu script, preserved in the Manuscript Library in Madras, which speaks about the story regarding image of Neela Madhava or Lord Jagannath of Udra desa, as Odisha was known in Middle Ages. It seems to have re-written during 16th century when the King of Khurda had newly installed the images after destruction made by Kalapahad, the notorious general of the Sultan of Bengal.

Notable Odia writer and Padma Shri awardee Artaballabha Mohanty has published the only available print record of Madala Panji. Madala Panji was traditionally kept in the houses of Deula Karana, Tadhau Karana and Gajapati Maharaja.

== See also ==
- Odia script
- Odia language
- Odia literature
