= Bhoi dynasty =

Medieval Odia Hindu dynasty

- 1541–1560; 1568–1947
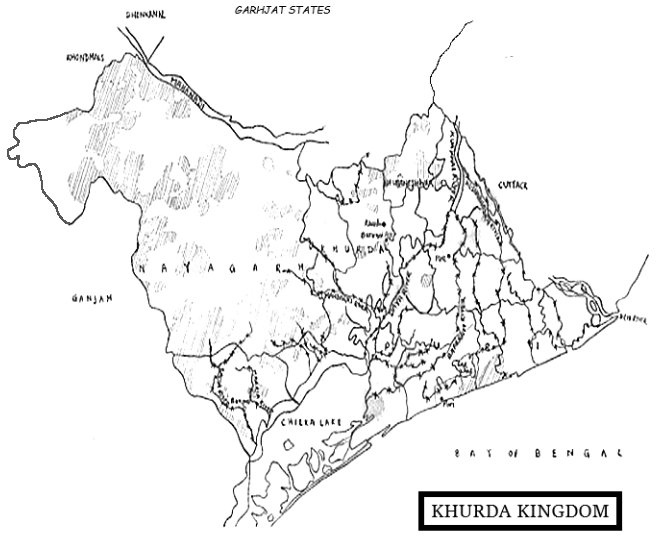
- Extent of the Khurda Kingdom in 18th century (c. 1720s – 1740s)
- Capital: Cuttack (1541–1560); Khurda (1568–1804); Puri (1809–1947)
- Common languages: Odia
- Religion: Hinduism
- Government: Monarchy
- Gajapati
  - 1541–1548: Govinda Vidyadhara
  - 1548–1557: Chakrapratapa
  - 1557–1558: Narsimha Ray Jena
  - 1558–1560: Raghuram Ray Chotaraya
- Historical era: Medieval India; Early modern period
  - Established: 1541
  - Disestablished: 1947
Preceded by
Gajapati dynasty
Succeeded by
Mughal Empire
Maratha Empire
British Empire
India
- Today part of: Odisha, India

The Bhoi dynasty or the Yaduvamsa (IAST: Yaduvaṃśa) dynasty were a medieval Hindu dynasty from the Indian subcontinent, which originated in the region of Odisha that reigned from 1541 to 1560 CE. Govinda Vidyadhara had usurped the throne from the later weaker Suryavamsa Gajapati Empire rulers as the kingdom started weakening but had a short-lived reign as ruling chiefs of Odisha as the ensuing internal rivalries and constant threats of invasions rendered them weak and were eventually overthrown by Mukunda Deva of Chalukya Dynasty in 1560.

Under Ramachandra Deva I, the dynasty shifted its capital to Khurda as Mukunda Deva lost his throne in 1568 to the Sultans of Bengal who eventually lost to the Mughal Empire in 1576. During that period, the Bhoi dynasty and the feudatory Garhjat states of Odisha became autonomous states in their own right and came under the Mughal imperial authority till 1717. Later they became vassals of the Maratha Empire who conquered Odisha by 1741 and were later defeated by the British East India Company in 1803. The kingdom was eventually annexed to the British Empire after the King led a failed rebellion against the British in 1804 but later reinstated at Puri in 1809. Later, the British granted him the management of the Jagannath Temple which the nominal heads of the dynasty retained to this day. In other words, the Bhoi dynasty still has the administrative control over one of the holiest shrines in Hinduism, which is the Jagannath Temple at Puri.

== Etymology ==
"Bhoi" or "Bhoimul" title was used by writers and accountants of the Karan community of the ruling dynasties.

== History ==
=== As Gajapatis of Odisha ===
With the death of Prataparudra Deva of the Suryavamsa Gajapati Empire in 1540 and a succession of weak rulers lead to the rise of political instability in the kingdom as there was a rise in internal squabbles, economic decline and increasing threats of invasions from both south and northern parts of the subcontinent. In the political chaos, the Gajapati Empire started weakening as Prataprudra Deva's successors were unable to maintain political authority. Taking de facto control of the situation, the general and minister of the kingdom, Govinda Vidyadhara decided to take the opportunity by murdering the successors of the Gajapati King and usurped the throne of Cuttack, thus laying the foundation of the Bhoi Dynasty.

Under his reign, the kingdom was still undergoing political upheaval as there were rebellions in different provinces and conflicts with the neighbouring Qutb Shahi rulers of the Golconda Sultanate. His 7 year reign came to an end in 1548 and was succeeded by his son Chakrapratapa whose 8 year reign came to an end when he was killed by his son Narasimha Ray in 1557. Around the same time, the influence of Mukunda Deva of the Chalukya dynasty began to grow at the court. He assassinated Narasimha Ray Jena and placed the King's younger brother, Raghuram Ray Chotaraya on the throne, making him his puppet ruler while also simultaneously fending off the influence of his rival, Janardhan Danai Vidyadhara, general and minister of Govinda Vidyadhara . The short-lived nearly two decade old reign of Bhoi dynasty as the ruling Kings of Odisha finally came to an end when Mukunda Deva assassinated Raghuram Ray Chotaraya and crowned himself in 1560.

=== Restoration and establishing the Khurda kingdom ===
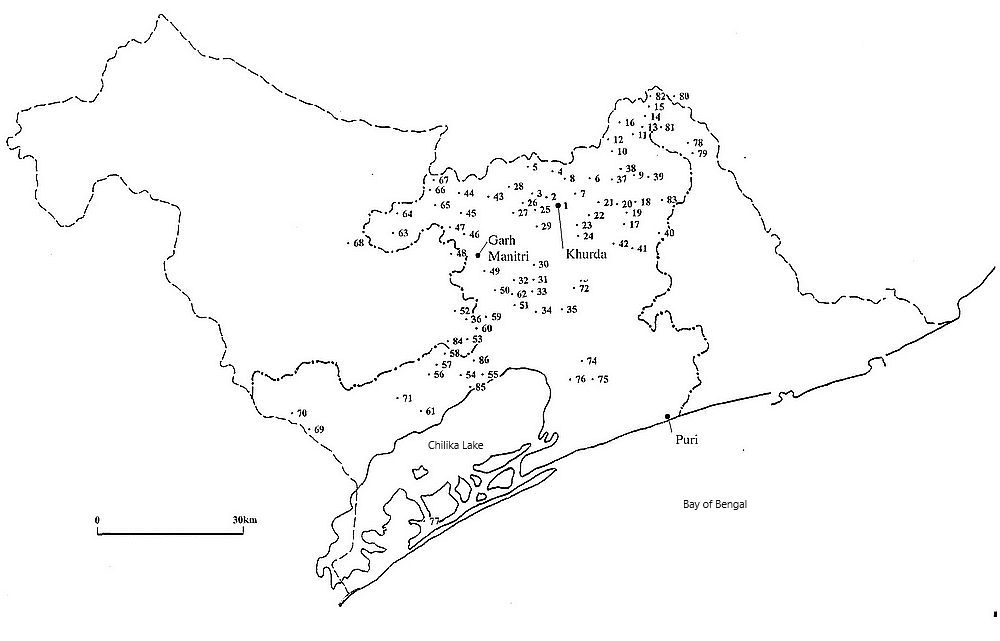
Forts located in the Khurda kingdom

With the defeat of the Chalukya king Mukunda Deva at Cuttack in 1568 at the hands of the Sultans of Bengal who subsequently lost to the Mughals in 1576, the fragmentation of territories of former Odra kingdom was well underway as the territories and the Barabati fort at Cuttack came under Mughal imperial control while the native feudatory Kings had become autonomous and vassals to the imperial rule. Meanwhile the surviving scion of the Bhoi dynasty led by the son of Danai Vidyadhara, Ramachandra Rautraya Mahapatra who took the regnal title as Ramachandra Deva I restored Bhoi rule by shifting the power centre by establishing the Khurda kingdom with their capital at Khurda. The extent of the kingdom ranged from Mahanadi river in the north to Khimidi in the South, while ranging from Khandapara-Daspalla in the west to the coasts of Puri in the east. He also retained control of the Jagannath Temple at Puri. The temple's status as the residing place of Lord Jagannath, the patron deity of Odia people, enabled Ramachandra Dev and the Bhoi dynasty to continue the nominal status and legacy of retaining the regnal titles of the historical ruling Kings of Odisha. Hence the Bhoi dynasty lays the foundation and legitimation of a political institution through the possession of a sacred temple-city thus deriving its legitimacy from an older imperial tradition.

Under Ramachandra Deva I, the patronage and pilgrimage of Jagannath temple at Puri resumed as he assumed its administrative control. He also constructed the Sakshigopal Temple at Sakhigopal near Puri. He also patronised Odia literature and arts as stability returned during his reign in the region following a spate of invasions. His successors continued to rule the kingdom as autonomous vassals to the Mughal Empire while fending off influence of the Mughal governor at Cuttack and continuing patronage of arts, culture and literature. This period coincides with the Riti Yuga, which is an important phase in Odia literature considering the evolution of language from middle Odia of Sarala and Panchasakhas Yuga to modern Odia.

=== Independence from Mughal Empire ===
Towards the late 17th and early 18th century, with the weakening of the Mughal Empire after its conflicts with the Marathas in the Mughal–Maratha Wars, the Mughal imperial authority over Odisha region started weakening as a result. King Divyasingha Deva I managed to defeat the Subahdar of the Mughal Governor of Bengal in 1707 thereby reducing their influence over the kingdom which eventually became independent of the Mughal sovereign authority by 1717 under his successor Harekrushna Deva.

The Bhois also maintained minor maritime and international trade links, albeit much reduced from the heydays of the Eastern Ganga dynasty and Gajapati Empire. This is noted from the Manchu language memorials and edicts depicting contacts under the reign of Qing dynasty in China, when the Qianlong Emperor received a gift from the Brahmin (Ch. Polomen 婆羅門, Ma. Bolomen) envoy of a ruler whose Manchu name was Birakišora han of Utg’ali (Ch. Wutegali bilaqishila han 烏特噶里畢拉奇碩拉汗), who is described as a ruler in Eastern India. Hence referring to Birakisore Deva I of Khurda (1736–1793) who styled himself as Gajapati, the ruler of Utkala. Many of the gosains entering Tibet from China passed through his territory when visiting the Jagannath temple at Puri.

=== Under Maratha Empire ===
The Maratha Empire under the Peshwas were rapidly expanding over most of the Indian subcontinent and by 1741 had brought most of Odisha and the Barabati fort under their control and also brought the Khurda kingdom under Birakesari Deva I under their vassalage. The Bengal Nawab's control over the Northern coast lasted until 1741 when Maratha Empire led by general Raghoji I Bhonsle of the Nagpur kingdom, led the Maratha expeditions against the Nawabs of Bengal and during the reign of Birakesari Deva I, Maratha invasions of Bengal took place. In 1751 CE, Alivardi Khan signed a peace treaty and ceded the de jure control of the Northern coast from Cuttack up to the river Suvarnarekha, following which all of Odisha formally became a part of the Maratha Empire, thus ending the last remaining vestiges of Islamic rule over Odisha.

The Aruna Stamba at the ruined Konark Temple was also brought over to the Jagannath Temple at Puri during the reign of Divyasingha Deva II. Under the reign of his son Mukundeva Deva II, the British started making inroads into the region and emerged as the strongest contenders after conquering the regions of Bengal, Awadh and much of Southern India. Eventually after the Maratha defeat in the Second Anglo-Maratha War, the British ultimately took over the region following the Treaty of Deogoan in 1803 and created the Orissa division within the Bengal Presidency. Conflicts with the British led Mukundeva Deva II to plot rebellions with the Paik leaders and local chieftains. The rebellion was discovered and suppressed and the kingdom was eventually annexed to the Orissa division in 1804. The kingdom's minister Jayi Rajaguru was executed for his role in the rebellion and following petitions, Mukunda Deva II was released and exiled to Cuttack and Midnapore but later was reinstated in 1809 and was allowed to retain his title.

=== Colonial period and shift to Puri ===
Following the 1804 rebellion of Mukunda Deva II, the British decided to take control of the administration of the Khurda kingdom which was hence annexed to the Orissa division. However due to uncertainties regarding the administration of the temple and other religious endowments, Mukunda Deva II was allowed to return but was pensioned off to Puri in 1809 to remain as a titular head of the dynasty albeit reduced to the status of a Zamindar. He was however successful in persuading the British to allow him to retain control of the administration of the Jagannath temple in the sacred temple-city of Puri as it was an important socio-political institution in the Orissa region. Thus as Rajas of Puri, the Bhoi dynasty managed to compensate for the loss of political power by building a religious institution through the superintendence of the hereditary temple of the Gajapati kings of Orissa.

=== Post Independence ===
This remained the case until independence when the Indian Constitution brought in a republican system of government following which the Odisha government through the Shri Jagannath Temple Act, 1955 formally took over the management and affairs of the temple. The Gajapati was retained as the Chairman of the Temple Managing Committee which the current head of the dynasty, Dibyasingha Deb fulfils along with the members of the committee appointed by the govt of Odisha.

=== Dhenkanal branch ===
Another brother of Govinda Vidyadhara, Harisingh Vidyadhara had conquered the Dhenkanal region during the rule of Prataparudra Deva during the Gajapati Empire rule in 1530 CE and laid the foundation of Dhenkanal State. The princely state acceded to India and merged into the state of Odisha following independence in 1947.

== Rulers ==
=== Gajapati of Odisha ===
- Govinda Vidyadhara (1541–1548)
- Chakrapratapa (1548–1557)
- Narasimha Ray Jena (1557–1558)
- Raghuram Ray Chotaraya (1558–1560)

Bhoi dynasty's reign as rulers of Odisha lasted nearly two decades, as they were deposed by Mukunda Deva in 1560. The dynasty then shifted its power centre to Khurda where they continued as Rajas of Khurda led by Vidyadhara's minister's son Ramachandra Deva I.

=== Khurda kingdom ===
- Ramachandra Deva I (Abhinav Indradyumna) (1568–1600)
- Purusottam Deva (1600–1621)
- Narasingha Deva (1621–1647)
- Balabhadra Deva (1647–1657)
- Mukunda Deva I (1657–1689)
- Divyasingha Deva I (1689 – 1716)
- Harekrushna Deva (1716–1720)
- Gopinath Deva (1720–1727)
- Ramachandra Deva II (1727–1736)
- Birakesari Deva I (Bhagirathi Deva) (1736–1793)
- Divyasingha Deva II (1793–1798)
- Mukundeva Deva II (1798–1804) (titular till 1809)

The Rajas of Khurda continued to rule the region well into the early 1800s but by then their power had diminished. Then the Raja of Khurda along with other local chieftains led a series of rebellions against the British in 1804 which was suppressed. The Raja of Khurda was exiled but later reinstated and shifted to Puri.

=== Puri Estate ===
- Mukundeva Deva II (1809–1817) (reinstated and continues as Raja of Puri)
- Ramchandra Deva III (1817–1854)
- Birakesari Deva II (1854–1859)
- Divyasingha Deva III (1859–1882)
- Mukundeva Deva III (1882–1926)
- Ramchandra Deva IV (1926–1956)
- Birakisore Deva III (1956–1970)
- Divyasingha Deva IV (1970–present, Current Raja of Puri and Titular Gajapati)

== Gallery ==
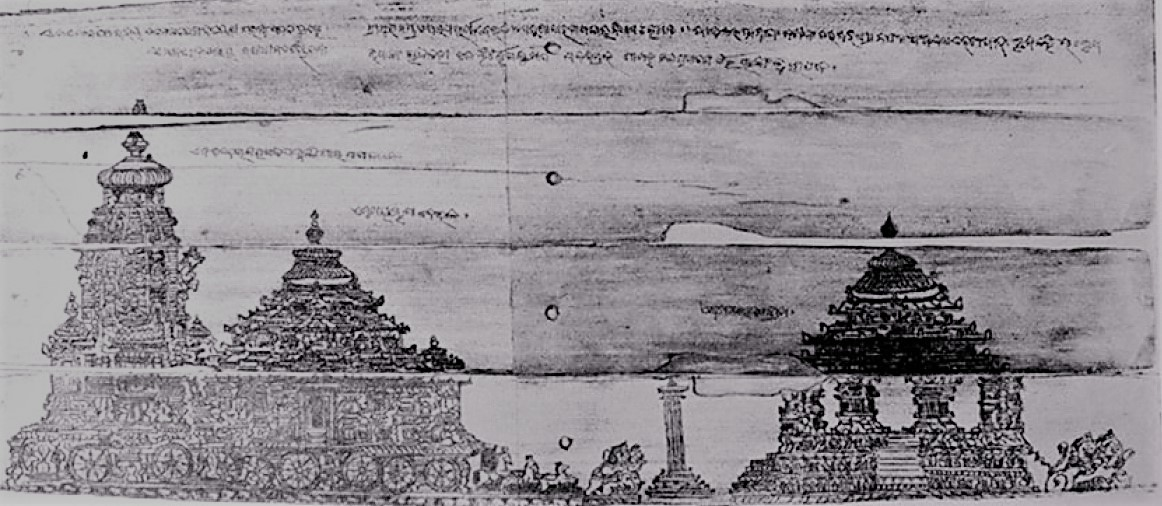
Konark temple sketch from an early 17th cen. palm leaf manuscript

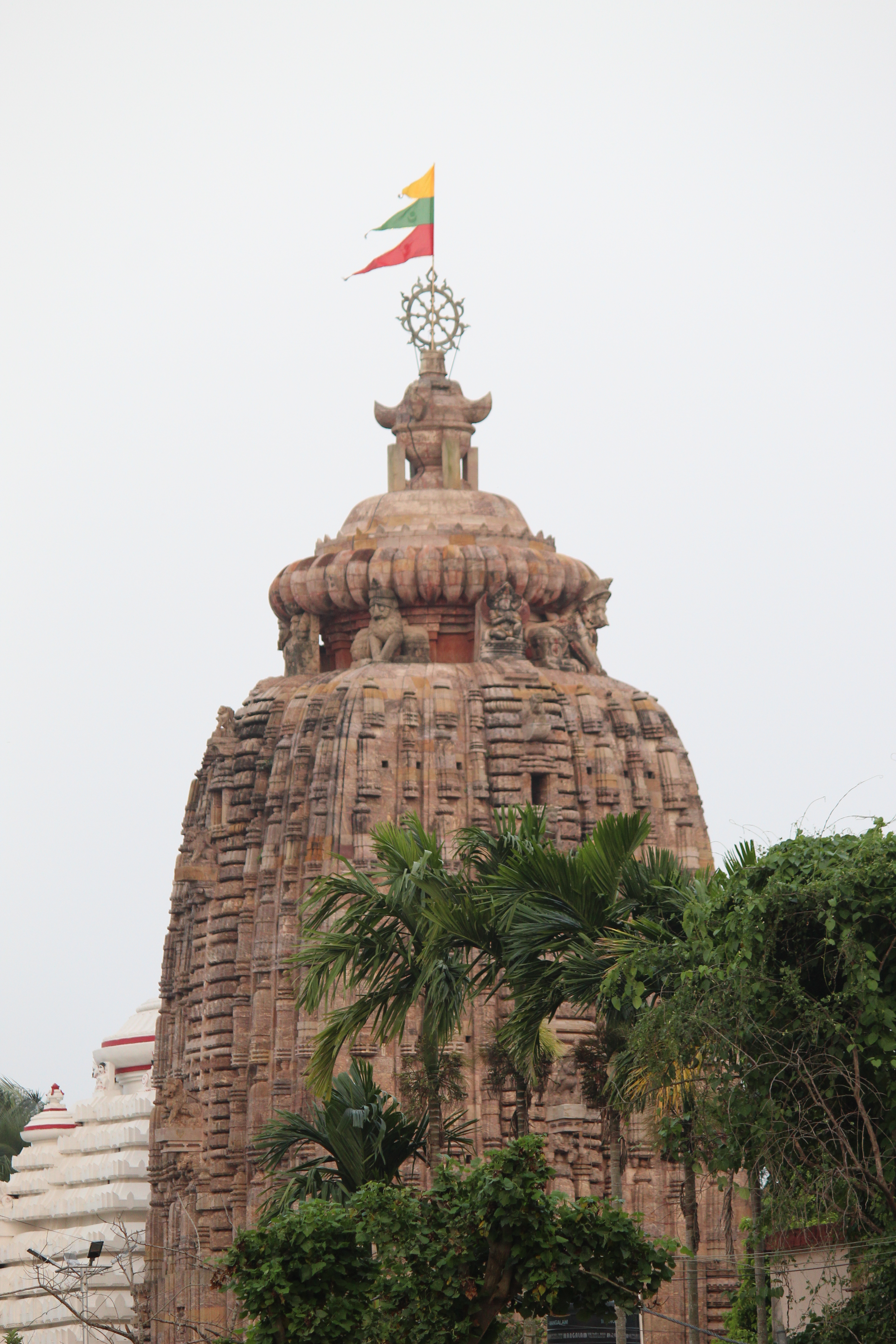
Sakhigopal temple

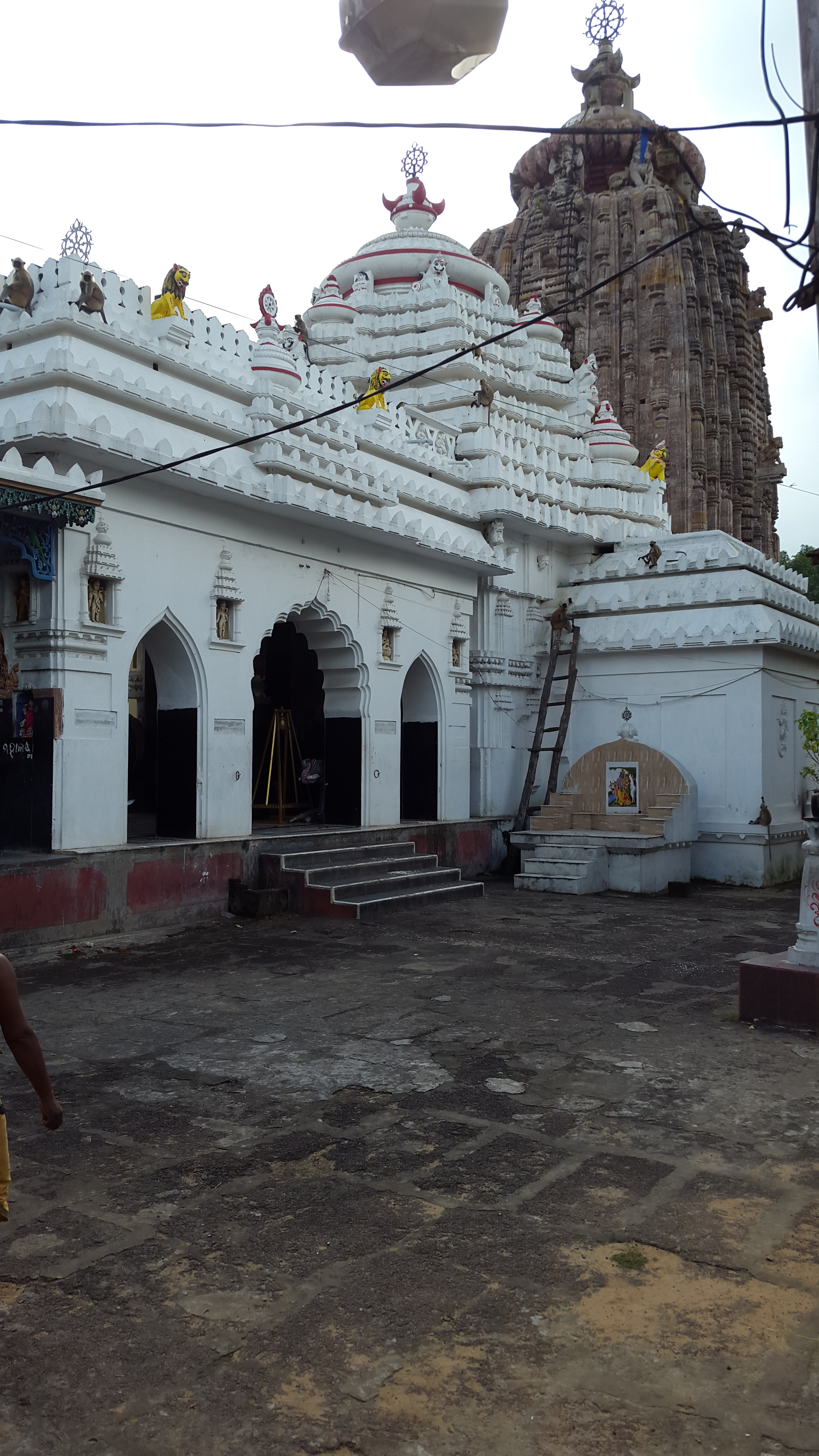
Satyabadi Gopinath temple

== See also ==
- Gajapati Empire
- List of rulers of Odisha
- Dhenkanal State, a branch of Bhoi Dynasty in Dhenkanal
- Ramachandra Deva I, founder of Bhoi Dynasty of Khordha
