= Prataparudra Deva =

Gajapati emperor from 1497 to 1538

- Gajapati; Maharajadhiraja; Dharma-maharaja; Gaudeswara; Rajrajeswar; Mahaparakrami kalingadhipati
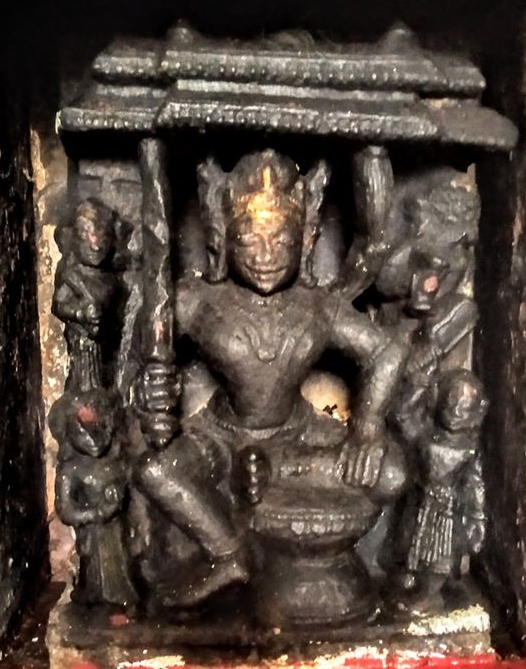
- Depiction of Gajapati Prataparudradeba in Sarpeswara temple, built during his rule at Balarampur village near Kakhadi.

3rd Gajapati Emperor
- Reign: 1497 – 27 October 1538
- Predecessor: Purushottama Deva
- Successor: Kalua Deva
- Died: 27 October 1538
- Spouse: Padma; Padmalaya; Ila; Mahila; Gauri Devi
- Issue: Virabhadra Deva; Ramachandra Deva; Annapurna Devi; Purushottama jana
- House: Suryavansha
- Father: Purushottama Deva
- Mother: Padmavati
- Religion: Hinduism

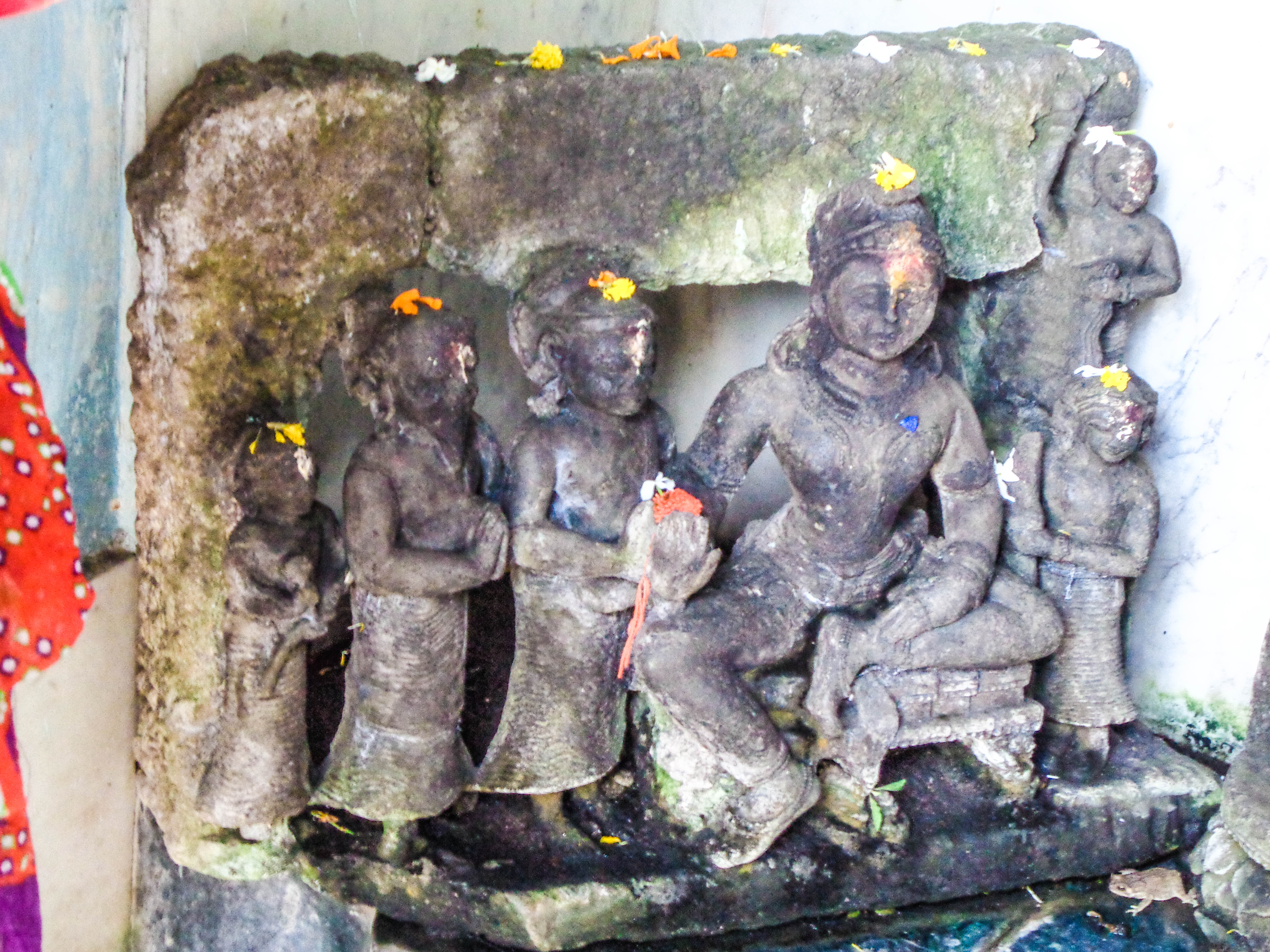
Gajapati Pratapaparudra Deva

Prataparudra Deva (Odia: ଗଜପତି ପ୍ରତାପରୁଦ୍ର ଦେବ; died 27 October 1548) was the third Gajapati emperor of Odisha from the Suryavamsa Gajapati Empire founded by his grandfather Kapilendra Deva. He reigned from 1497 to 1538. Besides being a monarch, he was a devout Vaishnava and adherent of the famous saint, Sri Chaitanya who arrived in Odisha during his reign. His life was extremely occupied with overwhelming military campaigns in defense of his inherited territory from three frontal invasions by the enemy states Vijayanagar, Hussain Shahi dynasty of Bengal and Turko-Persian Qutb Shahi dynasty of Golconda. He lost large portions of his territory to the neighboring enemy states initiating the dissolution of Odisha's military hegemony and imperial status that continued for nearly a period of 600 years before him.

== Military Conflicts on All Fronts ==
Prataparudra Deva's life was heavily occupied in dealing with continuous military threats by his neighboring rulers on multiple fronts.

=== First War with Hussain Shahi Dynasty of Bengal (1497–1500 CE) ===
On the death of Purushottam Deva, Prataparudra Deva was immediately engulfed with the defensive measures for his empire from the consistently invading parties of Gauda or Bengal sultan Alauddin Hussain Shah. The Bhakti Bhagavata Maha Kavyam states that he was only 17 years old when he faced this challenge and finally drove the invaders out of his northern borders. He reinforced the northern frontiers with more military deployment though minor skirmishes continued.

=== Southern Expedition and brief occupation of Vijayanagar (1500–1508 CE) ===
After being able to halt the invasions from Bengal, Prataparudra Deva marches south to recover and capture territories from Vijayanagar Kingdom. For a brief time he was able to capture Vijayanagara or Vidyanagar fort. Anantavarman copper plates of Prataparudra Deva states that he reached the banks of river Krishna on 4 November 1500 AD.

==== First conflict with Vijayanagar ====
The Saluva dynasty Emperor Immadi Narasimha Raya was ruling Vijayanagara when Prataparudra Deva sets out for his southern expedition. His influential general Tuluva Narasa Nayaka tried to recover Kondavidu and Udayagiri forts from the Prataparudra Deva in a military contest with the Gajapati. Prataparudra Deva's Anantakarma grant declares that he was able to capture the Krishna river basin with the use of force. The Odia army was unable to make any advance into Vijayanagara territory beyond their stronghold of Udayagiri region. The Odia army though managed to march to the tip of the Sethu Bandha or Ram Setu in the south.

==== Second conflict with Vijayanagar ====
According to the Rajavrolu plates of Prataparudra Deva and Madala Panji records, the Gajapati was camping on the river Ponnaiyar river banks and was successful in occupying parts of Vijayanagara for a brief time from Viranarasimha Raya after driving out the inmates of the fortified city there. However, the Gajapati had to suddenly return to Odisha as a severe famine ensued in his own realm in the year 1507–1508 CE.

==== Ismail Ghazi's Invasion in Absence of the Monarch ====
Ismail Ghazi marched straight on to the Gajapati capital of Cuttack from the Bengal frontier. A formidable defense was put up by the defending in charge Ananta Samantaray of the Barabati fort in Cuttack but due to the overwhelming number of the raiding forces, he had to retreat and re position in the Sarangagarh fort on the southern side of the Kathajodi river. Ismail marched on to the holy city of Puri where the servitors and priests of Puri temple secretly transported the Jagannath idols via a boat to a hidden island hill amidst the Chilika lake called Chadeiguha before his arrival. An Odia governor called Bhoi Bidyadhar organized the defense and continued clashing with the raiders until the Gajapati army returned. After arriving back in his realm with a large expeditionary force amidst these chaotic conditions, Prataparudra Deva pursued the fleeing forces into the frontier of Bengal laying seize to the Mandarana fort of Qutb Shahi forces at today's Jahanabad Sub-Division in Hoogly.

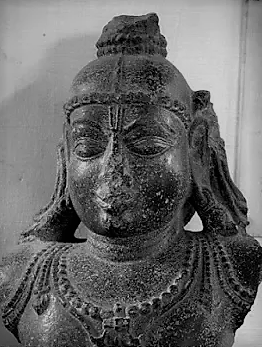
Surviving upper part of the Bala Gopala Idol carried away by invading Vijayanagar forces as a symbol of victory after capturing the Udayagiri fort

Udayagiri fort was guarded by a Gajapati garrison of 10,000 infantry, 400 cavalry and 8000 other men deployed at the outskirts of the fort. The guarding force was commanded by the paternal uncle of the Gajapati himself, Tirumala Routaraya. A strong contingent of Vijayanagara forces numbering 34,000 infantry and 800 war elephants marched through Gutti and Gondikotta laid a seize on the fort in the year 1512. A brave defensive hold out and consistent fight across the outer wall of the fort continued for 18 months without any help reaching to the combatants from Odisha. Portuguese-Jewish traveler Fernao Nunes accompanying the Vijayanagara Emperor writes that as the generals of Krishnadeva Raya failed to capture the fort, he himself took the charge. Nunes also mentions that there was a severe fight to tooth and nail put up by the forces from both the sides and the Odia forces were fighting with a strong determination to defend their position until their last breath. To secure an effective position for attacking the stubborn inmates inside the fort, Vijayanagara forces had to cut the rocky boulders and build paths through the surrounding hills. Since no help reached to the Gajapati forces, they had to surrender finally in the year 1514. A Balagopala idol of lord Sri Krishna was carried away unharmed by the Vijayanagara forces as victory trophy from the fort.

=== Conflict with Qutb Shahi Golconda Sultanate (1531 CE) ===
The Turko-Persian Sultan of Golconda Quli Qutb Shah invaded southern parts of Odisha and captured many forts along with the regional administrative center of Kondapalli on 20 March 1531. Prataparudra Deva set out with a force of 3,00,000 infantry, 30,000 cavalry and 700 war elephants to confront the invading forces and was successful after rigorous fighting with the Muslim forces but also lost many large portions of his territory in the south. His empire completely declined after his death.

== Spiritual life and association with Sri Chaitanya ==
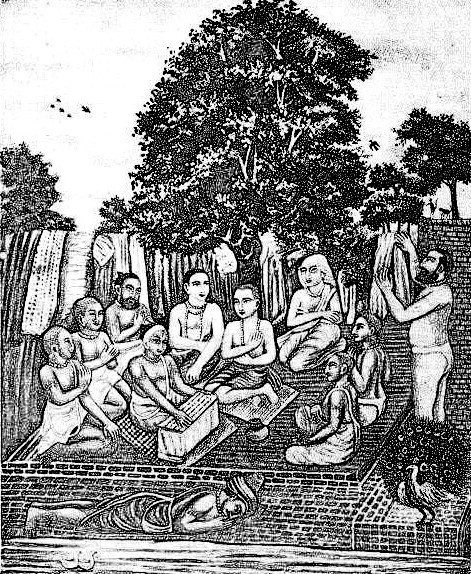
Painting of Gajapati Prataprudra Deva prostrating before Chaitanya

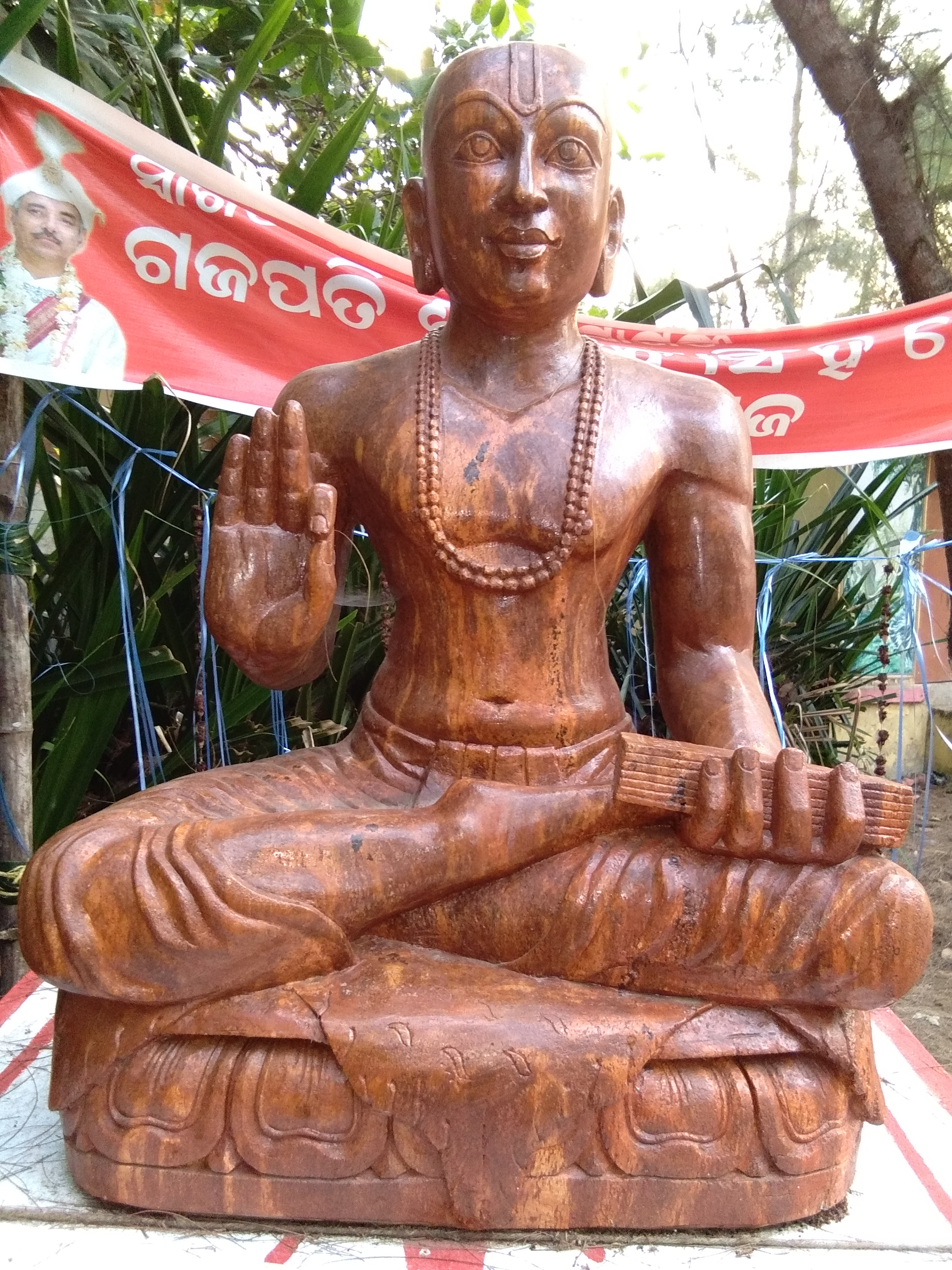
A modern-day statue of Sri Chaitanya in Puri town

Gajapati Prataparudra Deva is often held responsible for losing the military status of Odisha due to his spiritual adherence, over involvement and indulgence with Sri Chaitanya. The doubt of historians is based on the fact that the enemy Bengal Sultan Hussain Shah played a role in the life of Chaitanya. Two leading followers of Chaitanya, Rupa Goswami and Sanatana Goswami were courtiers in the administration of Hussain Shah before accompanying Chaitanya in his travel to Odisha. The governor of the southern territories of the Gajapati Ramananda Raya who was based at Rajamahendri was influenced by Chaitanya's words and left his position to follow him while the conditions in the southern frontiers were critical, enduring the invasion of Vijayanagar. However, Prataparudra was himself a devout Vaishnava before the arrival of Chaitanya and was also the head servitor of lord Jagannath as per the royal traditions of the Gajapatis of Odisha. The descriptions of a spy from Vijayanagar about the Gajapati's personal life gives a proper insight about his spiritual ways of living. As per the account, the Gajapati used to wake up two hours earlier before sunrise and would pay respects two brahmanas before looking at anyone else. He would then take ride on his horse accompanied by the Sixteen brahmana Patras for twenty to thirty miles before returning. After taking bath he would then indulge in worship of lord Jagannath only after which he eats food followed by recitation of Ramayana. After this he carries on his daily business wearing the official robes.

Despite his wish to meet and have an audience with Chaitanya, the saint avoided any audience as it was his discipline to avoid meeting women and kings. He was only able to see Chaitanya face to face while performing the Chera Pahara ritual during the Ratha Yatra festival of lord Jagannath following which he humbly bowed down to saints present there. Even in an event, he stopped his general Harichandana from taking any retaliatory action against a devotee of Chaitanya who had obstructed the view of the Gajapati by standing in front him and then slapped the general when he tried to move him away. In his first meeting with the saint after a long wait and as planned by his disciples, he began reciting a verse from 'Gopi Gita', mentioned in Shrimad Bhagavatam and won the attention of Chaitanya. He presented the saint with a painting of Krishna so that he can meditate on it. Ramananda Rai records about the Gajapati's extreme willingness to hear about devotional sermons from Chaitanya in his work Jagannatha-Vallabha-Natakam. Numerous literary works from the era celebrate the spiritual association of Gajapati Prataparudra Deva with Chaitanya.

== Cultural contribution, revival of Sanskrit and Odia literature ==
Prataparudra Deva had undertaken many building projects despite his troublesome life filled with battles.

=== Some building activities undertaken during Prataparudra Deva ===
- According to the Madala Panji he built the audience hall of the Jagannath temple at Puri.
- Renovation of the temples of Chandrasekhara on the Kapilasa hill in the Dhenkanal district and of Goddess Biraja in the Jajpur district.
- Construction of Dhavalesvara temple at Mancheswar in Cuttack district.
- Sarpeswar temple in Balarampur village near Kakhadi.
- Varaha Temple build by his Rajguru or royal head priest called Kashi Mishra at Jajpur district.
- Jagannath Ballav matha or monastery near Puri Jagannath temple established by Ramananda Ray.
- Renovated the temple of Paramahansa Deva near Biribati, Cuttack

In his Undavaill inscription he is termed as a great learner and master of 64 arts. His Velicherla plates states that he assumed the title of Vidyaniddhi (accomplished learner).

=== Sanskrit literary works composed during Prataparudra Deva ===
- Sarasvativilasam by Lalla Laxmidhar
- Contemporary of Advaita-makaranda by Sarvabhauma
- Bhakti Bhagavata Mahakavyam by Dimdima Jivadeva Acharaya
- Jagannatha Vallabha Natakam by Ramananda Raya
- Chaitanya Charitamrita by Kavikarnapura Paramananda Sena
- Lakshnadarsa, Ohurtacarita, Parijataharana Nataka and Rasamanjari by Divakara, a Grammarian,

Other Sanskrit poets like Markandeya, Ramakrishna Bhatta. Balabhadra Mishra flourished in his era.

==== Sanskrit works written by the Gajapati Prataparudra Deva himself ====
The king himself authored works like

- Sarasvativilasam
- Kautuka Chintamani
- Nirnya Samgraha,
- Praudha Pratapa Martand
- Vachaspativilasa
- Yogadipika
- Manva Dharmasastra Dipika
- Karnavatamsa and
- Saundaryalahari Vyakhya

=== Odia literary works composed during Prataparudra Deva's rule ===
Odia literature attained a higher status during the rule of Prataparudra, as it was the famous era of highly respected immortal Odia literary creations by the Panchsakhas, or five divine friends: Balarama Dasa, Jagannatha Dasa, Ananta Dasa, Achyutananda Dasa and Jasobanta Dasa. The Panchasakhas were basically opposed to the caste system and Brahmin patronage by the Odia kings. They were also opposed to Gaudiya Vaisnavism that had arrived in Odisha through Chaitanya and contributed to a separate school of learning called Utkaliya. Some of them had ideological conflict with the royal order but were later accepted and encouraged by the king himself after he realized his mistakes.

==== By Jagannatha Dasa ====
- Odia Bhagvata
- Arthakoili
- Gajastuti
- Darubrahma Gita
- Gundicha Vijay Dutibandha
- Radhamanjari
- Chaupadi Manasiksha
- Dhruba Charita
- Udaya Kahani

==== By Balarama Dasa ====
- Jagamohan or Dandi Ramayana
- Brahmanda Bhugol
- Vedantasara Gupta Gita
- Gita Abakasa
- Bhava Samudra
- Mriguni Stutte
- Laxhmi Purana

==== By Achyutananda Dasa ====
- Kaivarta Gita
- Harivamsa
- Gopalanka Oqala
- Baran Charita Gita
- Sunya Samhita
- Charikhani or Sabdabrahma Samhita

==== By Jasobanta Dasa ====
- Govinda Chandra Gita
- Premabhakti Brahmagita
- Govinda Chandra Gita
- Chaurashi Ajna
- Rasa
- Shiva Svaraday

==== By Ananata Dasa ====
- Garuda-Keshav Sambad
- Thikabahar
- Agatbhabishya·Malika Arthatareni
- Chumbak Malika
- Bhaktijuktidayak Gita
- Anakar Sabad
- Dibi Dibi Ohola
- Pinda Brahmanda Gita
- Hetu Uday Bhagava

Other Odia poets like Chaitanya Dasa, Arjuna Dasa, Kanhai Khuntia, Gopala Guru, Madhavi Devi and Madhaba Pattanayaka also flourished during his rule giving new dimensions to the literary achievements of Odia language in that era. Prataparudra Deva made it mandatory for only Jayadeva's Gitagovinda to be sung at while the Odia and Telugu Devadasis (temple dancers) while they performed. Four Vaishnava singers were trained to perform the service of singing Gitagovinda verses. It was during his rule that the Gotipua dance tradition was introduced.

== Personality and Historical Consequences ==
The rule of Prataparudra Deva was an era when a great social revolution in Odisha was at its zenith due to the Bhakti movement closely contested between the Gaudiya and Utkaliya Vaishnavism schools of thought. Common man was not untouched by the beautiful literature and devotional ballads that appeared before them composed by great devotees. Due to forced rigorous military campaigns and failed state policy, the military status of medieval Odisha declined during Prataparudra's rule and the empire was eventually reduced to only a small strip of land in eastern India covering parts of coastal and central Odisha, Northern Andhra and parts of southern Bengal. The tributary and Garhjat (princedoms), rebellious generals and hinterland domains within the Odishan realm destabilized the central authority of the Gajapatis in Odisha. As an emperor, Prataparudra Deva utilized his full available military strength to defend the frontiers of his empire but events of internal treachery, ignorant policies against a strategic threat from Muslim Bengal by his father and a possible situation of imbalance of his personal spiritual life with the instant demands from his military command, led to the loss of huge southern territories to his enemies. Prataparudra Deva had 32 sons and many daughters from his multiple wives out of which Padma, Padmalaya, Ila and Mahila are known to be the Maharanis or the main queens. One of his queens called Gauri Devi was the disciple of Jagannatha Dasa from the Panchasakha fold. His successors were murdered by the treacherous Govinda Vidyadhara after his death. The military hegemony and imperial status of Odisha continuing from the past era of Somavanshi and Eastern Gangas was lost after his ruling years ended with his death.

Prataparudra Deva Suryavamsa dynasty
Regnal titles
Preceded by Purushottama Deva	Gajapati of Odisha; 1497–1540	Succeeded by Kalua Deva
