= Krishna Chandra Panigrahi =

Indian archaeologist and historian (1909–1987)

- Born: 1 December 1909; Khiching, Mayurbhanj, Odisha
- Died: 25 February 1987 (aged 77)
- Education: M. A. (Ancient History, Sanskrit)
- Alma mater: Utkal University; University of Calcutta
- Occupation: Archeologist
- Children: 4
- Awards: Padma Shri

Krishna Chandra Panigrahi (1 December 1909 – 25 February 1987), often referred to as K.C. Panigrahi, was a notable Indian historian, archaeologist and literary expert from Odisha.

== Early life and education ==
He was born in Khiching, the former capital of the Bhanj dynasty, in Mayurbhanj district, Odisha where his father Sagar Panigrahi was a priest in the Kichakeshwari Temple. He completed his B.A in history from Ravenshaw College and in 1937, an M.A in Ancient Indian History and Culture from Calcutta university. He received his Ph.D. from Calcutta University in 1954 for his seminal work, The Archaeological Remains at Bhubaneswar.

== Career ==
Panigrahi was a research scholar specialising in pottery in the Archaeological Survey of India (ASI) from 1937 to 1944. He then joined the Orissa Educational Service as a lecturer in history until 1947. He then switched careers again to become the curator of the Orissa Museum between 1947 and 1951 before returning to teaching again. He rejoined the ASI as an Assistant Superintendent. He retired as a professor of history.

For his contribution to Odia literature, he has received several awards from Orissa Sahitya Academy. He received the Padma Shri, an award by Government of India for his contribution to literature and education. He got award sahitya academy for his biography Mo samaya ra odisha. His famous Story is Puspabara re barshabarana.

== Works ==
K.C. Panigrahi authored a large number of articles and books on history and archaeology.

- Bharata Prantatatwa 1960
- Archaeological Remains at Bhubaneswar. Orient Longmans. 1961.
- Archaeology of Orissa, 1961
- Itihasa o Kimbadanti. 1964.
- Prabhanda Manas, 1972
- Orissa ra Sanskriti o Itihasa re Jajpur, 1973
- Sarala Sahitya re Aitihasika Chitra, 1976
- History of Orissa. Kitab Mahal. 1981.
- Mo Samaya Ra Orissa (autobiography), c. 1983

== Death ==
Krishna Chandra Panigrahi died in 1987 at the age of 77. He had two sons and two daughters.
