= Shri Jagannath Temple Managing Committee =

Statutory body administering the Jagannath Temple in Puri, Odisha, India

- ଶ୍ରୀଜଗନ୍ନାଥ ମନ୍ଦିର ପରିଚାଳନା କମିଟି
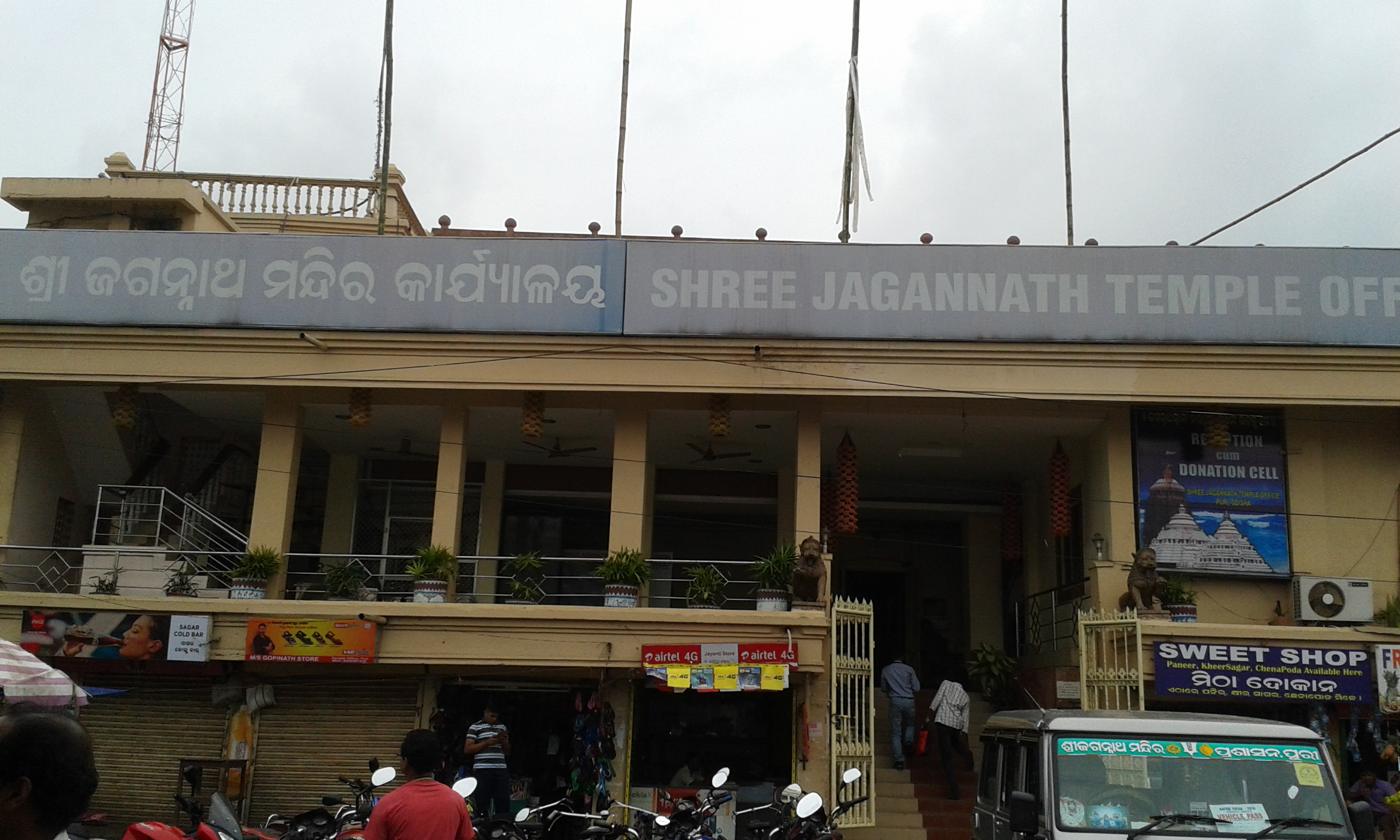
- Administrative office of the Shree Jagannath Temple Administration in Puri, from which the Managing Committee functions.
- Formation: 1955
- Founder: Government of Odisha
- Type: Statutory body
- Legal status: Body corporate
- Purpose: Administration and management of the Shri Jagannath Temple
- Headquarters: Puri, Odisha, India
- Location: Jagannath Temple, Puri
- Region served: India
- Official language: Odia, English
- Chairperson: Gajapati Maharaja of Puri (ex officio)

Shri Jagannath Temple Managing Committee (Note: Abbreviation for SJTMC) (Odia: ଶ୍ରୀଜଗନ୍ନାଥ ମନ୍ଦିର ପରିଚାଳନା କମିଟି; Odia pronunciation: [ʃriː dʒɔɡɔnːaːtʰɔ mɔnd̪irɔ pɔriˈtʃaːɭɔnaː kɔmiʈi]) is the statutory body of Jagannath Temple, Puri, responsible for administration, governance and overall management of the temple. It was constituted under the Shri Jagannath Temple Act, 1955 enacted by the Government of Odisha to provide a legal framework for the administration of one of the most important pilgrimage centres of Hinduism. The Managing Committee is a body corporate under the Act and is entrusted with the supervision of religious endowments, finances, properties, rituals and institutional administration of the temple in accordance with the established traditions and statutory provisions.

The Committee is separate from the Shree Jagannath Temple Administration (SJTA) which is the executive administrative setup headed by the Chief Administrator. Under the supervision of the Government of Odisha, the SJTA is responsible for day-to-day administration and implementation of the decisions of the Managing Committee, which is the statutory governing body constituted under the Act.

== History ==
For a few centuries, the administration of the Shri Jagannath Temple was under the hereditary supervision of the Gajapati Maharaja of Puri, who was acknowledged as the Adyasevak (first servant) of Lord Jagannath. The daily performance of the rituals was the responsibility of different categories of hereditary temple servitors (Sevayats) and the institution was supported by extensive landed endowments.

During the colonial period the British administration introduced a number of legislative measures to regulate temple activities but largely retained traditional religious practices. After independence of India and the integration of princely states into the Republic of India, the Government of Odisha carried out reforms to develop a modern statutory framework for temple administration.

The Shri Jagannath Temple Act, 1955 was enacted by the Odisha Legislative Assembly, substituting the old administrative structure with a statutory governance model. The Act vested the management of the temple and its endowments in a legally constituted Managing Committee, but preserved essential religious customs and recognised the traditional ceremonial position of the Gajapati Maharaja.

In the succeeding years the Act was amended several times to improve financial management, administrative accountability and to re-define the composition and powers of the Managing Committee and executive administration.

== Legal status and establishment ==
The Managing Committee derives its authority from the Shri Jagannath Temple Act, 1955, enacted by the Odisha Legislative Assembly. Section 5 of the Act establishes the Committee as a body corporate with perpetual succession and a common seal, capable of acquiring, holding and disposing of property and of suing or being sued in its corporate name.

The Act transferred the superintendence, control and management of the temple and its properties to the statutory Committee, subject to the provisions of the legislation. It also established the office of the Chief Administrator and other administrative officers to assist in implementing the Committee's decisions and managing the institution's daily affairs.

While the public discourse often refers to the governing authority of the temple as Shree Jagannath Temple Administration (SJTA), the statutory position under the Act makes a distinction between the two institutions. The Shri Jagannath Temple Managing Committee is the legally constituted governing body and the SJTA is the executive administrative organisation which is required to implement the resolutions of the Committee and look after the day to day administration under the Chief Administrator.

The powers of the Committee shall be exercised subject to the provisions of the Act, rules framed thereunder and directions issued by constitutional courts in relation to the administration, preservation and religious practices of the temple.

== Functions and responsibilities ==
The powers and functions of the Shri Jagannath Temple Managing Committee have been mainly laid down in the Shri Jagannath Temple Act, 1955. The Committee has general superintendence over the administration of the temple and is responsible for seeing that the religious, financial and institutional affairs of the temple are conducted according to the provisions of the Act and the established customs of the shrine.

Among its principal responsibilities are:

- defending the religious traditions, rituals and customs (nitis) of the temple;
- the management of the immovable and movable properties and the endowments of the temple;
- directing the collection and expenditure of temple income;
- budget approval and financial control management;
- proper conduct of festivals like the annual Ratha Yatra;
- regulating matters relating to temple servitors (sevayats) in accordance with statutory provisions;
- promoting the preservation of the temple’s heritage, records and religious institutions;
- and exercizing such other powers as may be conferred by the Act or the rules framed thereunder.

The Committee shall have authority to formulate administrative policies pertaining to temple governance, subject to the applicable law and the religious customs governing the institution.

== Organizational structure ==
The composition of Managing Committee shall be as prescribed under the Shri Jagannath Temple Act, 1955, as amended from time to time. Members of the Committee are ex officio and nominated by the Government of Odisha. They represent religious, administrative and public interests associated with the temple.

The Committee is headed by the Gajapati Maharaja of Puri who is the ex officio Chairman in recognition of the historic and ceremonial relationship between the royal house of Puri and the Jagannath Temple. The Committee is invested with statutory powers under the Act, but the Gajapati Maharaja continues to have a special religious status as the Adyasevak (first servant) of Lord Jagannath and performs significant ceremonial functions during temple rituals and festivals.

Other members shall be generally senior officers of the Government of Odisha and such other representatives as may be specified under the Act. Legislative changes have altered the precise makeup to improve administrative efficiency and public accountability.

== Administration ==
The Shree Jagannath Temple Administration (SJTA) is the executive administration of the temple, an administrative establishment constituted under the Shri Jagannath Temple Act, 1955. The SJTA is under the general superintendence of the Managing Committee and headed by the Chief Administrator appointed by the Government of Odisha.

The Additional Chief Administrators and other officers assist the Chief Administrator in the matters related to ritual administration, land and estate management, finance, development works, security, pilgrim services and legal affairs. The executive administration is responsible for implementing the resolutions of the Managing Committee and for liaison with the various Government departments during major festivals and public events.

The statutory framework recognizes the distinction between the Managing Committee and the SJTA: the former is the governing body responsible for policy and overall management, while the latter is the executive agency responsible for day-to-day administration.

== Role in the management of the Shri Jagannath Temple ==
The Managing Committee is the central institutional role in the governance of Shri Jagannath Temple. It attempts to reconcile the preservation of centuries-old religious traditions with the needs of modern public administration, heritage conservation and pilgrimage management.

It has the regular duty of supervising the Ratha Yatra every year, which is one of the largest religious festivals in India. While many government agencies are involved in planning and public safety, the committee and the SJTA are responsible for ritual observances, coordination with hereditary servitors, temple logistics and implementation of ceremonial procedures prescribed by long-standing tradition.

The Committee also considers management of temple lands, protection of endowed properties, maintenance of temple records, management of donations, conservation initiatives and measures relating to the welfare and regulation of temple servitors. In recent decades it has increasingly collaborated with the Archaeological Survey of India, Government of Odisha and the Supreme Court of India on matters of structural conservation, crowd management and institutional reform.

== Major reforms and developments ==
Since its inception, the Managing Committee has undertaken a number of administrative and institutional reforms to improve governance while preserving the religious traditions associated with the temple. The Shri Jagannath Temple Act, 1955 has been amended to alter the composition of the Committee, increase the powers of the executive administration, and make provisions for the financial accountability and management of the property.

In proceedings relating to the management of the temple, the Supreme Court of India in 2019 gave a series of directions with respect to the administration of the temple. The Court dealt with issues like maintenance of records, management of temple properties, sanitation, crowd management, welfare of sevayats and inventory of temple assets. The directions were later complied with by the Managing Committee and the Shree Jagannath Temple Administration by filing compliance reports and taking several administrative measures.

The Committee has also been instrumental in planning and overseeing the arrangements for the periodic Nabakalebara ceremonies, when the wooden idols of Jagannath, Balabhadra, Subhadra and Sudarshana are ritually renewed. The last Nabakalebara was conducted in 2015 and involved a lot of coordination between the temple authorities, hereditary servitors and the Government of Odisha

Another major development is the implementation of Shree Mandira Parikrama (Puri Heritage Corridor) Project for improving the amenities of the pilgrims and redeveloping the area around the temple. The project was supported by the Managing Committee and the SJTA but was also subject to litigation concerning heritage conservation and compliance with archaeological regulations. In 2022, the Supreme Court had declined to interfere for staying the progress of the project when related proceedings were pending before other forums.

In 2024, the temple’s Ratna Bhandar (treasury) was reopened after several decades, for structural assessment and conservation, and a fresh inventory of valuables was planned, another major administrative exercise involving the Managing Committee, the SJTA, the Government of Odisha and the Archaeological Survey of India.

== Controversies ==
The Managing Committee as the statutory authority for one of the most prominent Hindu temples in India has been periodically involved in public and legal controversies.

The administration of the Ratna Bhandar has been an ongoing issue, in particular the finding in 2018 that the original keys to one of its rooms could not be located. The issue has caused public debate, official inquiries and judicial proceedings concerning the security, inventory and preservation of the valuables of the temple.

The Puri Heritage Corridor Project also faced controversy regarding archaeological conservation, demolition of nearby structures, and adherence to the Ancient Monuments and Archaeological Sites and Remains Act. Some aspects of the project were challenged by the petitioners before the Orissa High Court and the Supreme Court. The state government and temple authorities contended that the redevelopment was meant to enhance facilities for pilgrims and preserve the temple precincts.

The administration of hereditary temple servitors (sevayats), crowd management during major festivals and regulation of temple lands have also periodically drawn public attention and recommendations for administrative reform by courts, government committees and independent observers.

== See also ==
- Jagannath Temple, Puri
- Ratha Yatra (Puri)
- Jagannath
- Nabakalebara
- Sevayat
