= Puri Estate =

Estate in the Bhoi dynasty

- 1809–1947
- Capital: Puri
- Common languages: Odia
- Religion: Hinduism
- Government: Monarchy
- Gajapati
  - 1809–1817: Mukundeva Deva II
  - 1926–1947: Ramchandra Deva IV
- Historical era: Modern period
  - Established: 1809
  - Disestablished: 1947
Preceded by	Succeeded by
Khurda Kingdom; British Empire	India
- Today part of: Odisha, India

The Puri Estate was an estate ruled by the main branch of the Bhoi dynasty, who were reinstated in Puri in 1809 following the 1804 rebellion against the British and annexation of the Khurda Kingdom which were under their control. After the rebellion led by the Khurda king, Mukunda Deva II, the British decided to take control of the administration of the Khurda kingdom and Mukunda Deva II was exiled to Cuttack and Mindapore but was later reinstated and pensioned off to Puri to remain as the head of the dynasty while retaining control over the Jagannath Temple.

They were the ruling kings of Puri and inherited the titular legacy of the historical ruling chiefs of Odisha invested in the title of Gajapati. They also exercised administrative control of the Jagannath Temple at Puri until the independence of India.

== History ==
=== Establishing the Puri branch ===
The title of Gajapati and the control of the Jagannath temple of Puri was in the hands of the rulers of the Bhoi dynasty who ruled as the chiefs of the Khurda kingdom. After the 1804 rebellion of Mukunda Deva II, the British confiscated the Khurda kingdom thus annexing it to the Orissa division. Mukunda Deva II was later reinstated at Puri in 1809 to continue as the Gajapati but the state was reduced to a Zamindari. However, he successfully retained the administrative control of the Jagannath temple in the sacred temple-city of Puri with the help of British legislation, as the title represented an important socio-political institution in the region of Orissa. Thus the loss of political power was compsensated by building a religious institution through the superintendence of the hereditary temple of the Gajapati kings of Orissa by investing it in the institution of the Kings of Puri. Mukundeva Deva II's grandson Birakesari Deva II became the king in 1854 but since he was childless, he along with his wife, Rani Suryamani Patamahadei adopted a prince from the zamindari of Badakhemundi of Eastern Ganga dynasty. With the prince's accession to the throne as Gajapati Dibyasingha Deva III in 1859. During his reign he was involved in a court case which prompted the British to take over the administration of the temple but followed by the agitations and petitions of the temple priests decided to repeal and grant administration to the Gajapati's mother Rani Suryamani Patamahadei and recognised his son, Mukundeva Deva III as the next Gajapati.

On 2 October 1918, Mukundeva Deva III adopted Lal Mohini Mohan Deb, the third son of Raja Satchidananda Tribhuban Deb of the Bamra State belonging to Eastern Ganga dynasty as his heir. Lal Mohini Mohan Deb took the regnal name of Gajapati Ramachandra Deb IV upon accession to the throne of Puri and Gajapati on 14 February 1926. He remained at the helm as the superintendent of the hereditary temple of Puri until the independence of India in 1947.

=== Post independence and titular head ===
After independence, the Indian Constitution brought in a republican system of government and it was followed up by the Odisha government which passed the Shri Jagannath Temple Act, 1955 formally took over the management and affairs of the temple. The Gajapati was hence retained as the Chairman of the Temple Managing Committee which the current head of the dynasty, Dibyasingha Deb fulfils along with the members of the committee appointed by the govt of Odisha.

== Ceremonial titles ==
The ceremonial regnal title of the Gajapati Maharaja is as follows:

Shree Shree Shree Veerashree Gajapati Goudeswar Nabakotikarnatatkala Kalabaragesvara Viradhiviravar Bhuta Vairaba Sadhu Sasnotirna Routraja Atula Balaparakrama Sahasra Bahu Kshetriyakula Dhumaketu Maharaja Adhiraja (regnal name)

=== Customary title of Gajapati upon accession ===
The cyclical order the names of the Gajapati Maharaja:

- Ramchandra Deva
- Birakeshari Deva
- Divyasingha Deva
- Mukunda Deva

The heir to the current titular Gajapati, Dibyasingha Deva IV upon accession will take the regnal name of Mukunda Deva IV.

=== Customary title of the queens of Gajapati upon accession ===
- Chandramani Patamahadei
- Suryamani Patamahadei
- Leelavati Patamahadei
- Padmabati Patamahadei

== Rulers ==
The rulers of Puri and Gajapati Maharajah:

- Mukundeva Deva II (1804–1817) (Ruler of the Khurda Kingdom until 1804 and continues as King of Puri)
- Ramchandra Deva III (1817–1854)
- Birakesari Deva II (1854–1859)
- Divyasingha Deva III (1859–1882)
- Mukundeva Deva III (1882–1926)
- Ramchandra Deva IV (14 February 1926 – 15 August 1947)

=== Titular ===
- Ramchandra Deva IV (15 August 1947 – 15 November 1956)
- Birakisore Deva III (15 November 1956 – 8 June 1970)
- Divyasingha Deva IV (8 June 1970 – present; current titular Gajapati)

== See also ==
- Bhoi dynasty
- List of rulers of Odisha
