= Sevāyata =

Caste system in India

Sevayat
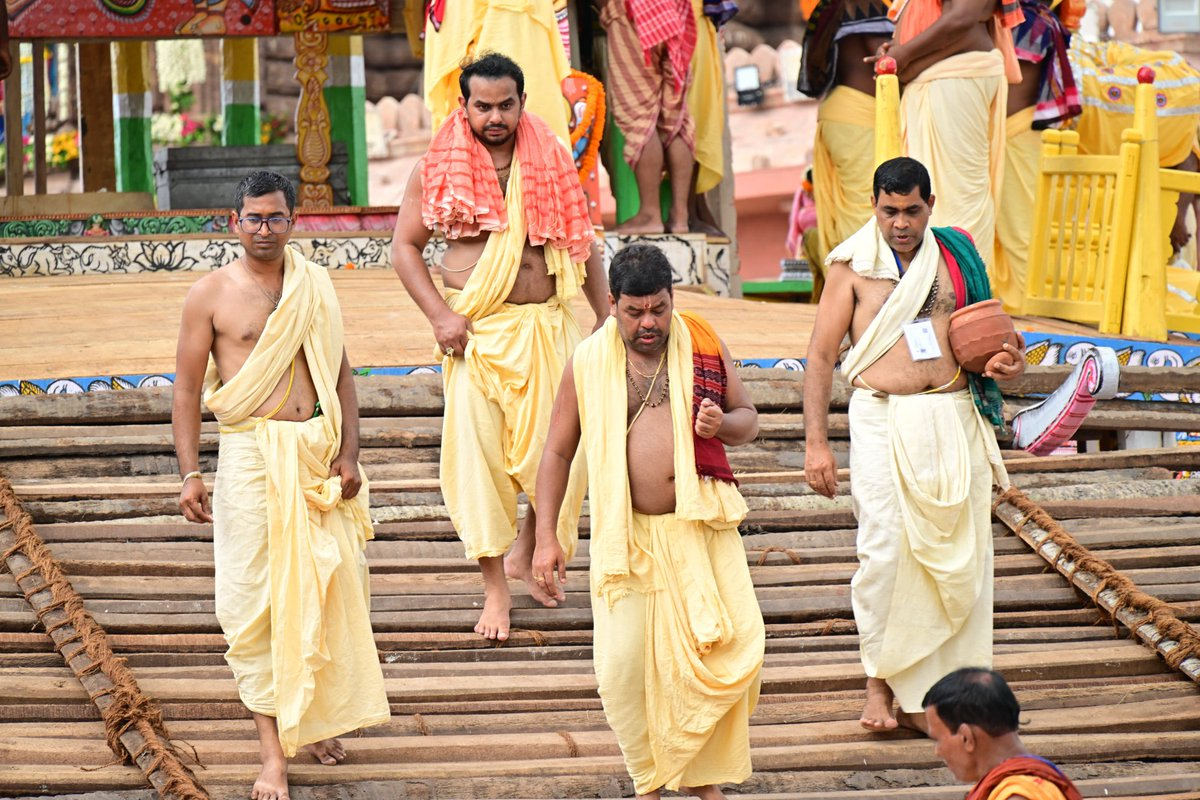
- Sevayats of Jagannath Temple engaged in ritual service on the chariot during Ratha Yatra
- Varna: Mixed (Note: Primarily Brahmin and Karan, with other service groups)
- Jāti: Multiple hereditary service groups
- Classification: Temple servitor community
- Gotra: Varies by subgroup
- Veda: Varies (Note: Primarily Rigveda and Yajurveda among Brahmin sevayats)
- Kuladevta (male): Jagannath
- Kuladevi (female): Subhadra
- Guru: Traditionally hereditary or temple-affiliated gurus
- Mantra: Vaishnavite mantras (Note: e.g., "Om Namo Bhagavate Vasudevaya")
- Religions: Hinduism
- Languages: Odia
- Country: India
- Original state: Odisha
- Populated states: Odisha
- Region: Puri
- Ethnicity: Odia people
- Migration to India: Limited (Note: Primarily localized to temple regions)
- Population: Not officially recorded
- Family names: Panda, Dash, Mishra, Mahapatra, etc. (Note: Varies by role)
- Lineage: Hereditary (Note: Service-based lineage)
- Color: Red (nali); White (dhala); Yellow (haladia) (Note: Varies by occasion)
- Endogamous: Generally endogamous within subgroups
- Subdivisions: 119 (Note: e.g., Pujapanda, Suara, Mekap, Khuntia) (Note: See Classification of Sevayats)
- Related groups: Temple servitor communities in other Hindu temples
- Historical grouping: Gajapati-era temple administration
- Status: Traditional servitor class
- Kingdom (original): Eastern Ganga dynasty
- Kingdom (other): Gajapati Kingdom

Notes
- The Sevayat system is a part of the Jagannath Temple tradition and includes both hereditary ritual and administrative roles.

Sevayat (Note: Also known by other spellings.) (pl. sevāyatas; lit. 'One who performs service') is a term for a group of hereditary temple servants who work at the Jagannath Temple in Puri and do ritual, administrative, and service work in a structured caste system. The Sevayat community is made up of many different caste groups, such as Brahmins, non-Brahmin service castes, and tribal groups like the Daitas. Each group has its own hereditary roles based on long-standing temple traditions. Their jobs include priestly worship and preparing offerings, as well as managing the logistics of rituals and festivals. They are an important part of the temple's daily operations and annual events like the Ratha Yatra.

The Sevayat system is an example of a ritual-occupational hierarchy in Hindu temple institutions. It is based on customary laws and written records like the temple's Record of Rights. The system combines religious duty with social identity and hereditary privilege. Sevayats traditionally use specific ritual colours in their attire and temple practice. (Note: As described in Ritual attire and colours)

== Terminology and variants ==
=== Etymology ===
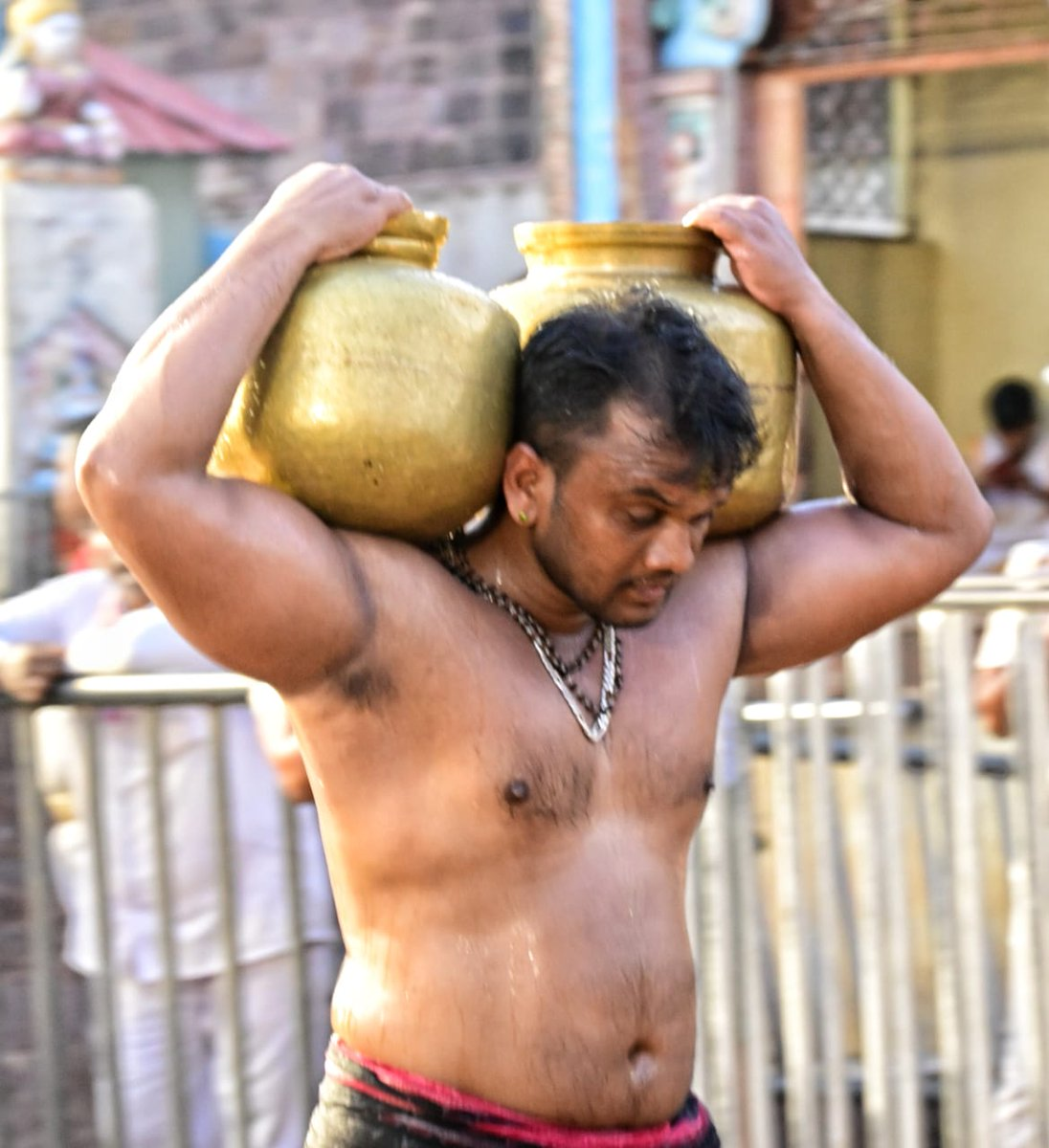
Sevayat taking water from the well for Adharapana Ritual

The word "Sevayat" (also spelled Sewayat, or Sebayat) comes from the Sanskrit word seva, which means service, attendance, or devotional duty, and a suffix -yat that means agent or practitioner. In this context, a Sevayat literally means "one who performs service," especially in a religious or ritual setting. In eastern India, especially in Odisha, the term is closely linked to temple traditions. Also known as Sevak, it came to mean people who were given certain tasks to do in the service of gods.

Historically, the term evolved within the institutional context of the Jagannath Temple in Puri, where it developed a more specific connotation pertaining to hereditary temple servitors. Over time, Sevayat became more than just a job title; it also became a way for people to identify themselves socially, reflecting both their jobs and their caste ties within the temple hierarchy.

=== Variant spellings ===
Because of differences in transliteration, regional pronunciation, and colonial-era documentation, the term exists in several variant forms, including:

- Sevayat (/seːʋaːjət/; say-VAA-yut)
- Sebayat (/sebaːjət/; say-BAA-yut)
- Sewayat (/seːwaːjət/; say-WAA-yut)

These variations are mostly due to phonetic differences arising from the interaction between Sanskrit, Odia and English transliteration systems and do not indicate differences in meaning. The spelling Sebayat is particularly common in Odia usage, where the phoneme "/v/" is often realised as "/b/".

The term Sevak (सेवक) is, on the other hand, a more general Sanskrit-derived term meaning servant or devotee, and is employed in many Hindu traditions more broadly without necessarily implying a formal or hereditary role.

== History ==
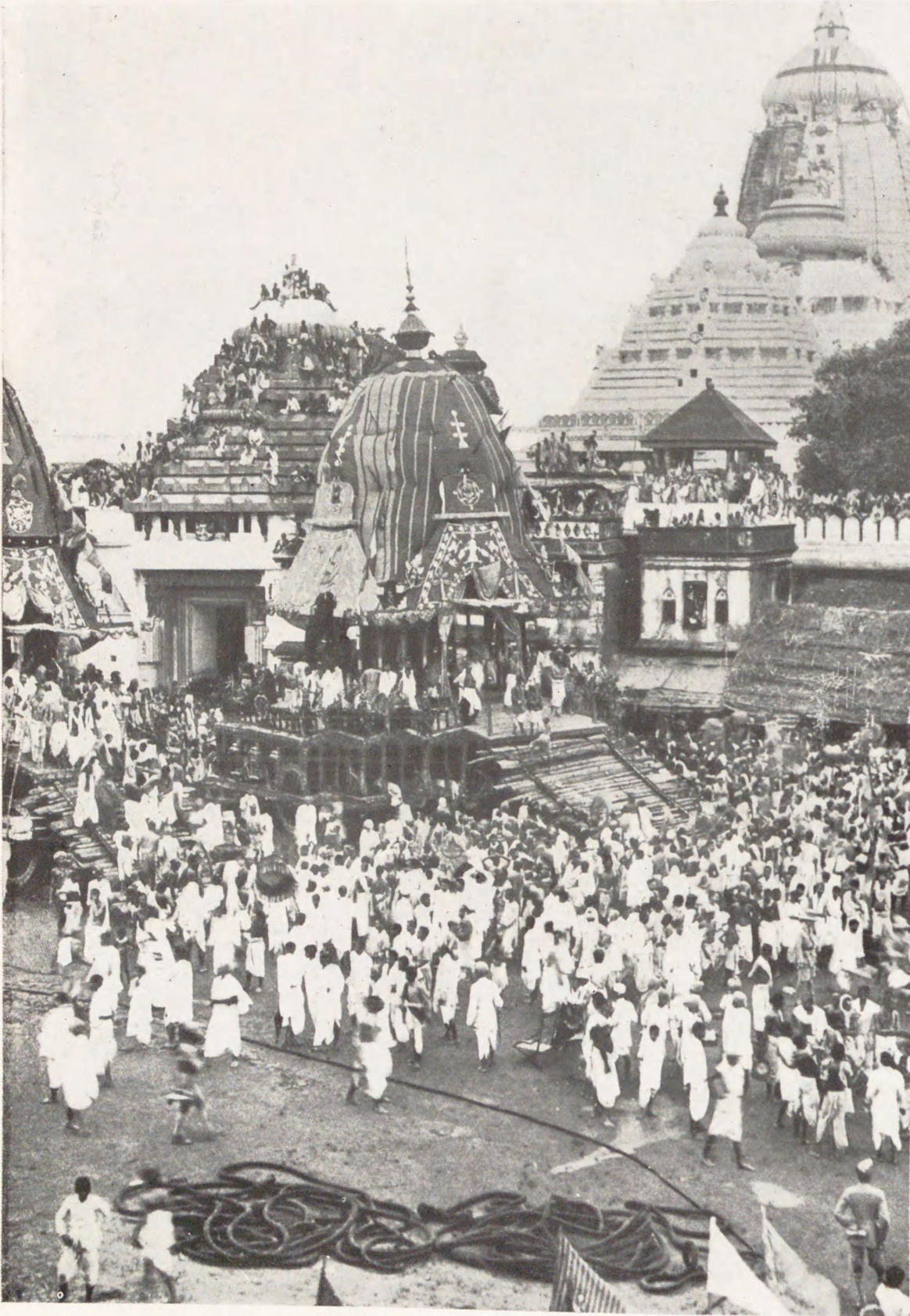
Ratha Yatra at the Jagannath Temple, Puri c. 1931

The Sevayat system came about around the same time that the Jagannath Temple in Puri became a major religious center in eastern India. The structure of hereditary temple service can usually be traced back to the Middle Ages, especially during the rule of the Eastern Ganga dynasty (12th–15th centuries), when the temple emerged as a center of royal patronage and ritual authority. The Gajapati kings made temple administration organized, and different groups were given specific service roles. This was the start of the Sevayat system.

The Sevayats' work was guided by temple records and customary practices. The Madala Panji, the temple's traditional chronicle, was the most important of these. These records show how the duties, privileges, and hierarchies of servitors changed over time. They also show that there was a clear system of occupational specialization based on lineage and caste. As time went on, the Sevayat roles became hereditary, passing from one generation to the next. This made the institutional structure more stable.

In the colonial period the British administrators intended to control temple affairs indirectly, generally accepting the existing servitor rights but imposing administrative controls. This resulted in partial codification of roles and disputes regarding authority and entitlement between different Sevayat groups. After independence, a major development took place in the form of enactment of Shri Jagannath Temple Act, 1955 whereby the temple was brought under a statutory management but at the same time traditional rights and duties of the Sevayats as recorded in the Record of Rights of the temple were preserved.

Today, the Sevayat system represents a continuity of medieval temple traditions adapted within a modern legal and administrative framework, maintaining its central role in the ritual and cultural life associated with the Jagannath tradition.

== Organisation and hierarchy ==
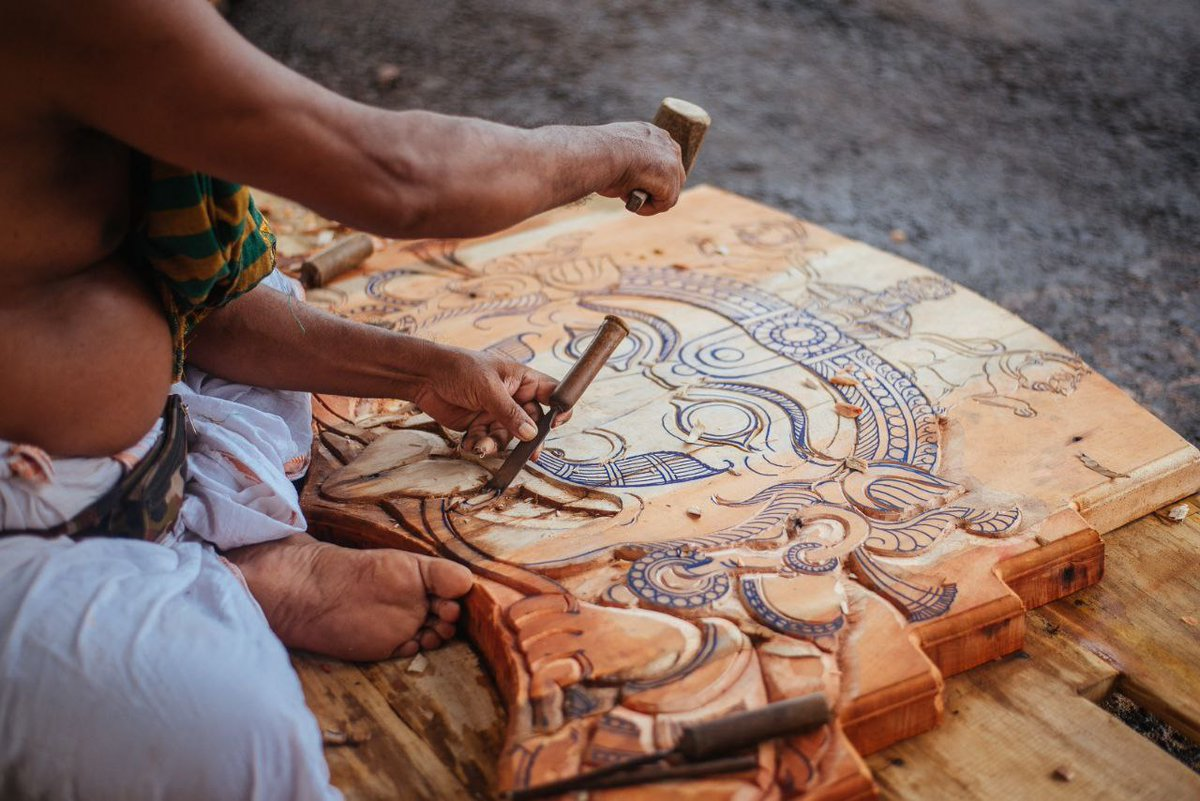
Maharana Sevayata making Side Idols or Ratha at Puri

The Sevayat system operates on a thoroughly structured ritual and occupational hierarchy that was created within the Jagannath Temple, Puri's institutional framework. Sevayats are split into different service groups, each with its own set of roles, privileges, and responsibilities that are spelled out in the temple's Record of Rights.

The hierarchy is based on a mix of ritual status, caste, and specialization in a certain area. Brahmin Sevayats usually work as priests, while non-Brahmin groups do logistical, artisanal, and support work.

=== Adya Sevak (the principal sevak) ===
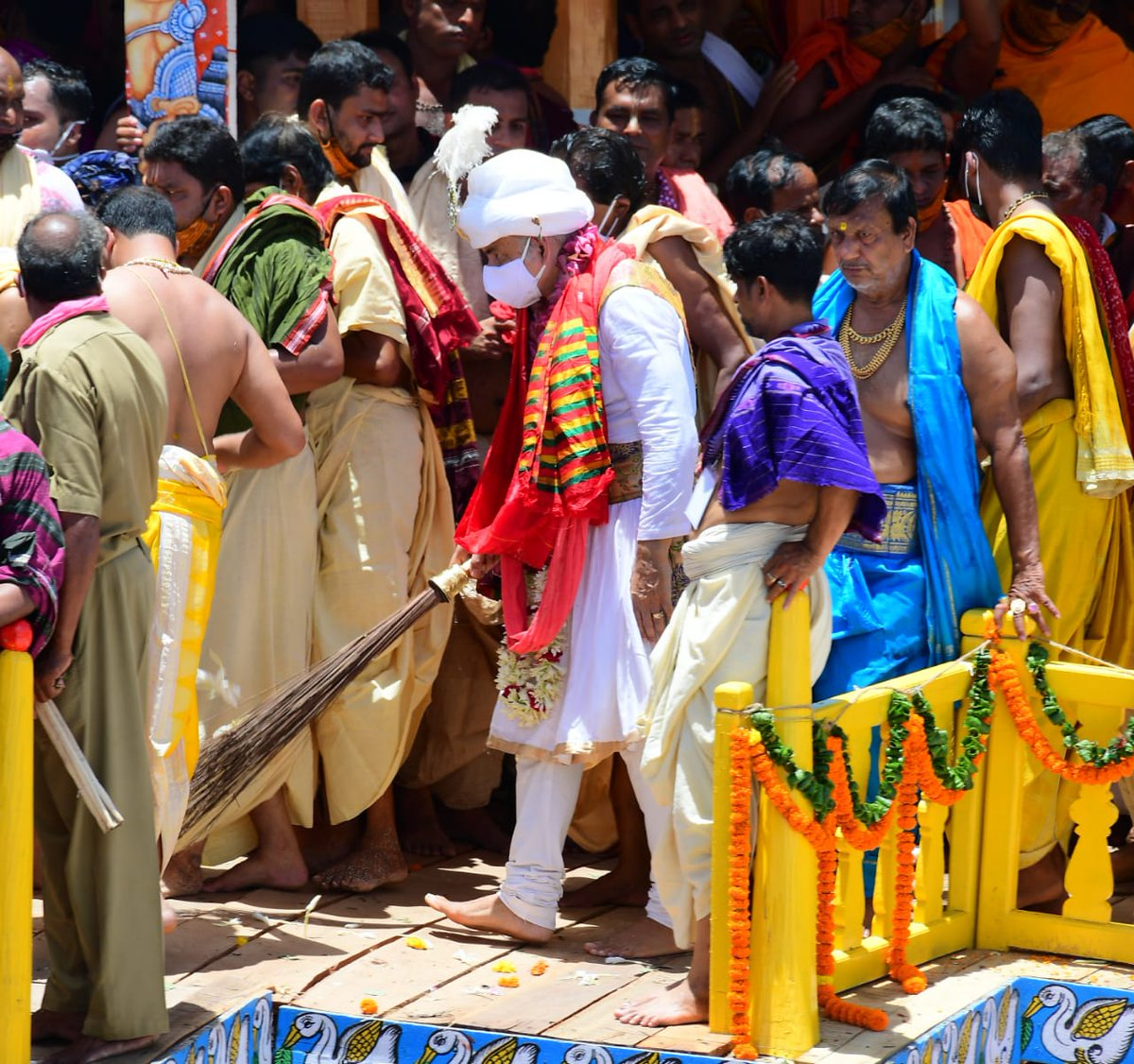
Chhera Pahanra (Note: Sweeping of the Chariots.) by Gajapati Maharaja Dibyasingha Deba in Ratha Yatra, 2021

Gajapati is another common name for Maharaja of Puri, commonly known as the king of Puri. He is the primary Sevak, and he plays a significant part in the Car Festival, Snana Yatra, Dola Yatra, and Chandan Yatra. Additionally, he plays a significant part in Navkalebar, which occurs once every 19 years.

=== Other sevaks ===
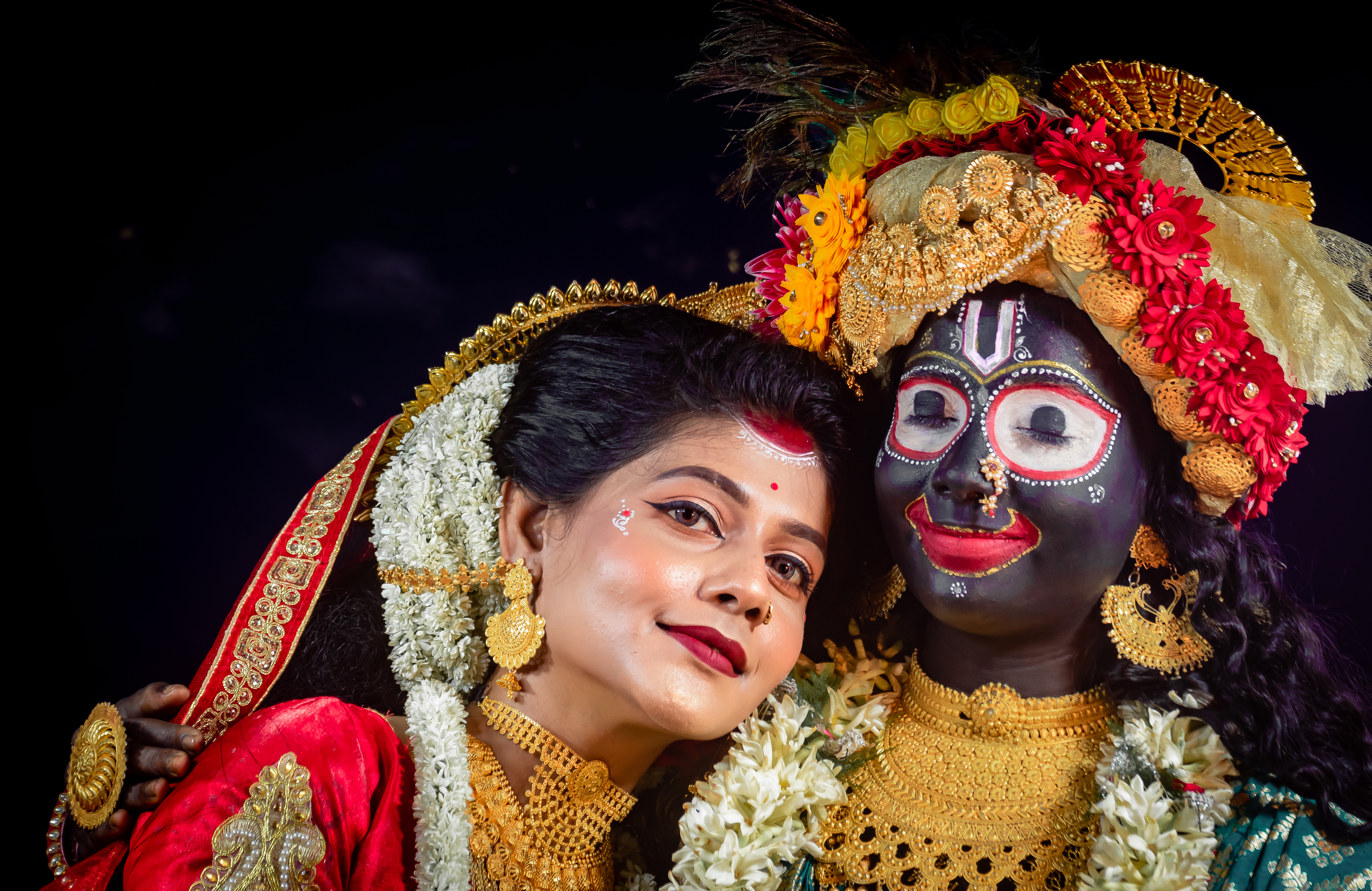
Modern portrait of Devadasi

There are 119 other types of servants besides the king. However, according to the official Record of Rights, only 119, including the king himself, is mentioned. One seva that was not recorded in the Record of Rights was revived in the year 1988 by the temple administration i.e. Beherakaran Seva. There are 14 sevas (ritual services) that are no longer performed. They include Panikikata, Daudibandha, Binakar, Gitagovind, Bhitargayani, Madeli, Patarabindha, Sankhua, Kalabethia, Kumbharibisoi, Malachula, Banua, Mapasaitakaran, Charchakaran. The temple officials have given a number of explanations for why some sevas have been discontinued. These include the system's hereditary character, which caused some sevayat families without male heirs to stop performing the rituals, and the lack of procedures for enlisting people from outside the sevayat society, which ultimately contributed to their discontinuation. Furthermore, several sevas were limited in scope and did not generate enough revenue to support a livelihood, which led to their termination. Furthermore, as societal conditions changed, some traditions, like the Devdasi seva, which required new Devadasis to be introduced by practitioners, progressively stopped.

== Ritual system (Nitis) ==
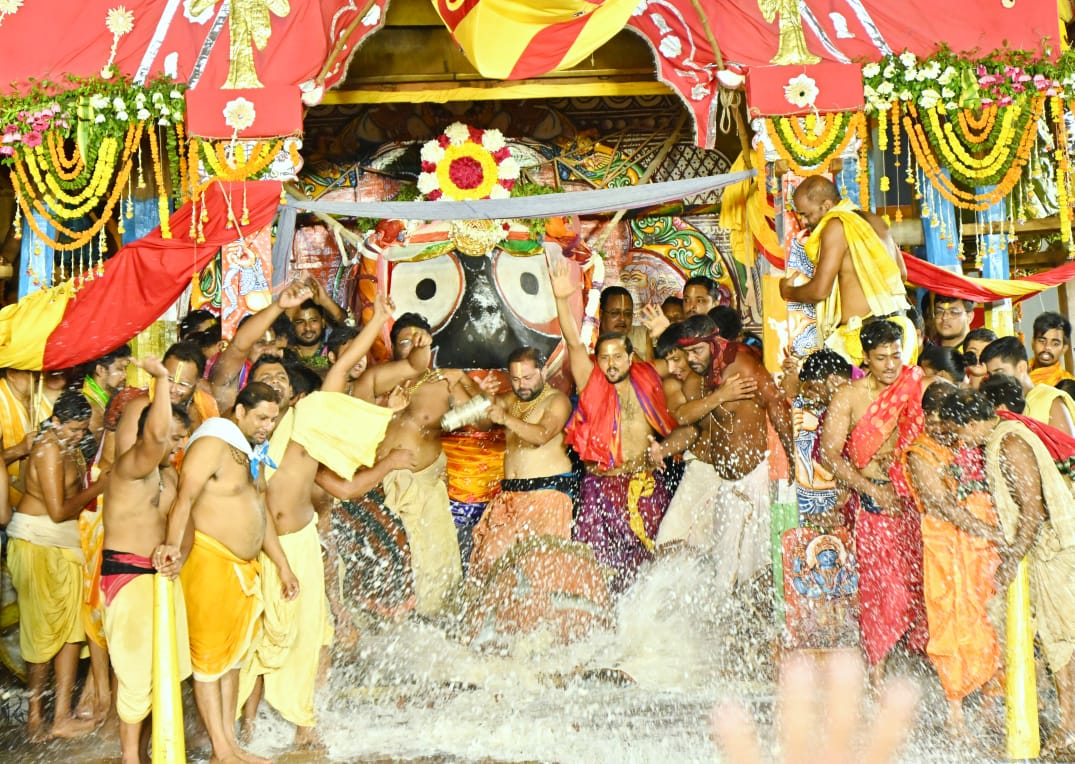
Sevayats performing Adhara Pana Niti, 2013

The rituals or nitis system of Lord Jagannath is incredibly detailed and involves more than 100 categories of sevayat or servitors, who, through the year, take their specified turn to perform their seva. The rituals or nitis are so much interlinked and interdependent with one another that the performance of a particular service is a sine qua non for the performance of the next service. The whole system of ritual is divided into three categories.

These are daily rituals, periodical or special occasion rituals and the major festival rituals. Daily rituals are something fixed or observed every day. Special or periodical rituals are according to the specialty and occurrence on certain days and months. Throughout the year, a varying number of festival rituals are conducted regularly both inside and outside the temple. The main temple sanctum sanctorum is famous for its main deities Lord Jagannath, Lord Baladhara, Goddess Subhadra and Lord Sudharshan. There are more than 20 gods and goddesses in the temple complex like Goddess Mahalaxmi, Goddess Bimala, Lord Ganesh (at 3 places in different poses) and the famous Kalpa Bata (The wish-fulfilling oldest banyan tree) in the center of the temple.

=== Periodic rituals ===
According to scriptures, there are some periodical rituals also. Each Thursday Lord Jagannath and Goddess Laxmi meet in the afternoon, which is believed to discuss the affairs of the world. On each Ekadashi (11th day as per Lunar calendar) evening, lamps are taken to the top of the temple and circumambulated around Neela Chakra. On each Amabasya day (last day of the dark fortnight) Lord Jagannath goes to the seashore to perform a special ritual as Mahodadhi Arati as the sacred sea is believed to be his father-in-law as per Skanda Purana. This ritual is performed by Sabat Nijoga a particular class of servitors earmarked for the purpose.

The Lord's regal status is also symbolized by the annual Benta, or hunting ceremony, and Banaka Laagi, where paintings of the deities are performed. Additionally, the birthday celebrations of Lord Balabhadra, also known as Shravana Makara, Sri Jagannatha, also known as Rohini Brusha, and Goddess Subhadra, also known as Jyestha Bichha, are marked by particular rites based on the constellation of stars. On certain days of the year, such as Sri Ram Navami, Janmashtami, and Nrushingha Janma, the birthday celebrations of Sri Ram, Sri Krishna, and Nrusingha are also commemorated according to the rituals.

=== Festival rituals ===
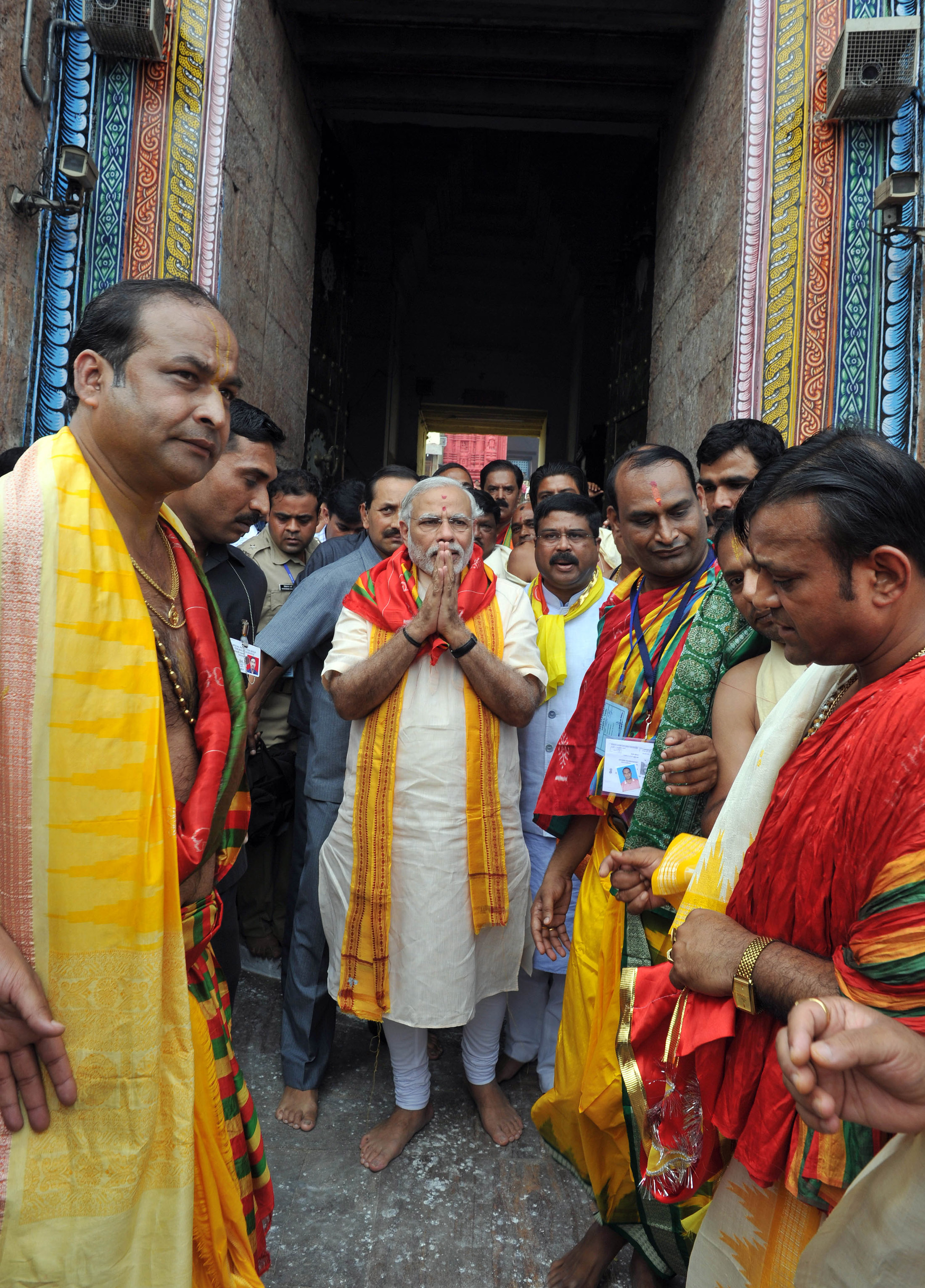
Prime Minister Narendra Modi at Shri Jagannath Temple, Puri, 2016

According to the Niladri Mahodaya, there are about 65 rituals performed annually, of which 12 are well-known festivals like Chandan Yatra, Devsnana Purnima (when the Deities take celestial bath), Car Festival, Sayan Ekadashi, Dola Utsav, Dakshinayana Yatra, Uttarayana Yatra, Damanak Yatra, Parswa Paribartan, Hari Utthapan Ekadasi, Pravarana Sasthi, and Pusyabhiseka, where additional servants are hired to perform certain roles.

=== Special festival rituals ===
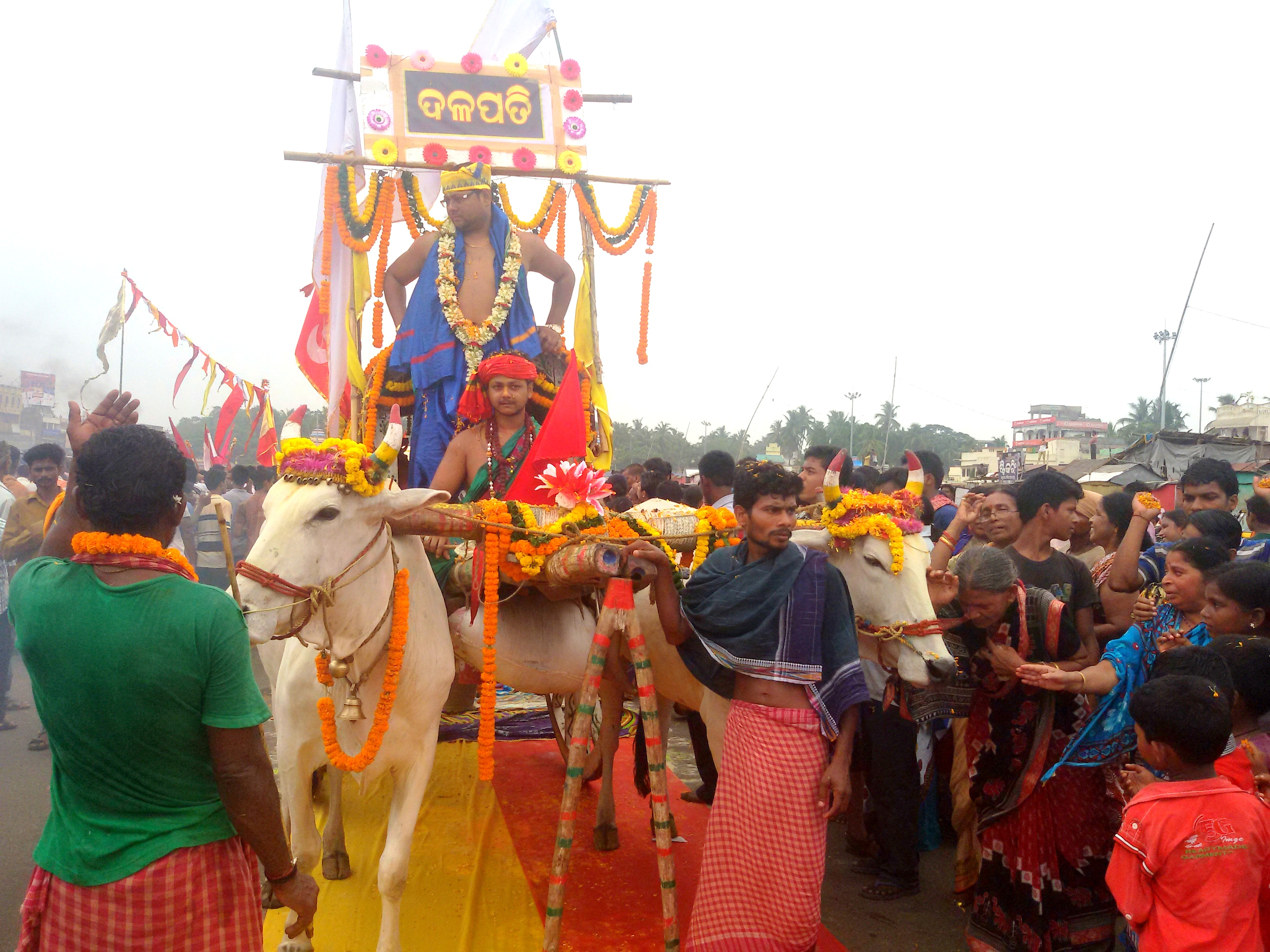
Banajāga Jātra festival in Nabakalebara, 2015 (Note: Image courtesy of Aditya Mahar, available under the Creative Commons Attribution-ShareAlike 4.0 International License.)

The role of the ritual functionaries becomes increasingly prominent on important occasions like Navakalebar, which is a very complicated and challenging process. Every 19 years, Navkalebar, also known as the embodiment ceremony, takes place. It lasts for about two months and attracts millions of people from all over the world.

== Ritual attire and colours ==
Traditionally, the Sevayats wear cotton clothes where red and white colours are important in daily rituals.

During important festivals and rituals, such as Ratha Yatra, Sevayats are also expected to wear certain ceremonial cloths such as pata (silken fabric) as part of their assigned duties. These colours are symbolic in the temple tradition of purity of ritual, auspiciousness and devotion.

== Classification of Sevayats ==
There are 120 hereditary service categories for sevayats. The Jagannath temple's Record of Rights initially had just 119 categories. The Temple administration later brought back one seva. Many rites, like Devadasi Seva, have been discontinued and are no longer carried out. (Note: See Organisation and hierarchy section.) Each one is linked to a certain set of ritual or administrative duties.

=== List of Sevayat categories ===
The following table lists the hereditary categories of Sevayats as recorded in the Record of Rights of the Jagannath Temple.

Sl. No.	Sevayat category	Primary function
1	Gajapati Maharaja	Chief servitor and ceremonial head of the temple
2	Parichha / Raj Guru	Royal priest and advisor
3	Chhatisha Nijog Nayak	Head of the servitor groups
4	Bhitarchha Mohapatra	Inner temple supervision
5	Talichha	Temple security and discipline
6	Mudrahasta (Mudirasta)	Seal and administrative functions
7	Deula Purohit	Temple priest
8	Puja Panda	Conduct of daily worship rituals
9	Badapanda	Supervisory priest
10	Pushpalaka	Flower decoration and rituals
11	Mahajana	Temple finance and supervision
12	Mudra	Administrative assistant roles
13	Khuntia	Guarding and assisting rituals
14	Bhandara Mekap	Store management
15	Palia Mekap	Custodian duties
16	Akhanda Mekap	Maintenance of perpetual lamps
17	Changada Mekap	Material handling
18	Khataseja Mekap	Preparation of bedding for deities
19	Pratihari	Gatekeeping and ceremonial duties
20	Daita	Special rituals during Anasara and Ratha Yatra
21	Pati Mahapatra	Ritual supervision
22	Patribadu	Ritual assistance
23	Garabadu	Temple cleaning and maintenance
24	Suarabadu	Cooking assistance
25	Khurinayak	Supervisory duties
26	Mukhapauhala	Announcement and communication
27	Ghatuari	Ritual support
28	Gochhikara	Cow and dairy-related service
29	Suna Goswami	Gold ornament supervision
30	Muduli	General assistance
31	Alati Balita Sevaka	Supply of lamp wicks
32	Amalutoli / Purakharada	Preparation of special food items
33	Amunia Chhatars	Leading food procession
34	Anasara Sudha Suara	Food and drink during Anasara
35	Asthana Pratihari	Water sprinkling and ritual support
36	Baanua	Fireworks supply
37	Badasuara	Preparation of cakes and sweets
38	Badhei	Carpenter
39	Bahardeuli Jogania	Supply of food materials
40	Bahar Deuli Suara	Cooking for Goddess Lakshmi kitchen
41	Ballava Jogania	Supply of provisions for offerings
42	Ballava Suara	Preparation of specific food offerings
43	Bhandar Mekap	Storekeeping and inventory management
44	Bhandar Khuntia	Guarding temple treasury and stores
45	Bhitar Gauni	Inner temple cleaning and maintenance
46	Bhoga Mandapa Suara	Cooking offerings for Bhoga Mandapa
47	Bhoga Mandapa Mekap	Arrangement of offerings in hall
48	Chamar Sevaka	Fanning the deities with chamara
49	Changada Khuntia	Assistance in transport of materials
50	Darpania	Mirror-related ritual service
51	Deula Karana	Temple record keeping
52	Deula Mekap	Maintenance of temple structure
53	Deula Pratihari	Inner gatekeeping duties
54	Dipa Sevaka	Lighting lamps during rituals
55	Dolabedi Sevaka	Ritual duties during Dol Yatra
56	Ghanta Sevaka	Ringing bells during rituals
57	Gopal Ballava Suara	Preparation of Gopal Ballava Bhoga
58	Hata Suara	Cooking in temple kitchen sections
59	Jaga Khuntia	Guarding temple premises
60	Jogananda	Assisting ritual arrangements
61	Kotha Suara	Kitchen-related cooking duties
62	Lenka	Messenger and ceremonial guard
63	Madeli	Drum beating during rituals
64	Mahasuara	Head cook of temple kitchen
65	Malia	Garland making and floral service
66	Mekap (general)	Custodian and maintenance roles
67	Nahak	Barber and ceremonial grooming duties
68	Pahada Sevaka	Ritual duties during closing (Pahada)
69	Palia Khuntia	Rotational guard duty
70	Patara	Leaf plate preparation for offerings
71	Patjoshi Mahapatra	Ritual officiation and astrology
72	Raghaba Das Math Sevaka	Association with matha services
73	Ratha Bhoi	Chariot pulling and assistance
74	Ratha Khala Sevaka	Chariot construction yard duties
75	Samartha	Supervisory and coordination roles
76	Sankha Sevaka	Blowing conch during rituals
77	Singhara Sevaka	Decoration of deities
78	Suara (general)	Cooking of Mahaprasad
79	Tadhau Karana	Documentation and clerical work
80	Tadhau Khuntia	Guarding during specific rituals
81	Tadhau Mekap	Custodial and maintenance duties
82	Tadhau Palia	Rotational service duties
83	Tadhau Suara	Cooking-related duties
84	Tanka Sevaka	Monetary and offering-related service
85	Telenga Bada	Oil supply for rituals
86	Telenga Sana	Assistance in oil-related service
87	Thali Mekap	Arrangement of ritual plates
88	Tika Ghara Sevaka	Preparation of ritual marks (tika)
89	Tulasi Sevaka	Supply of sacred basil leaves
90	Upadhyaya	Religious instruction and priestly assistance
91	Vaishnava Sevaka	Devotional and ritual assistance
92	Veda Pathi	Recitation of Vedic hymns
93	Baisi Pahacha Pratihari	Guarding the sacred steps
94	Baula Sevaka	Assistance in ritual arrangements
95	Chhati Gharia	Timekeeping and ritual scheduling
96	Danda Sevaka	Carrying ritual staffs
97	Ghoda Sevaka	Care of ceremonial horses
98	Jhadu Sevaka	Sweeping and cleanliness
99	Kumbhara	Potter supplying ritual vessels
100	Mahabhoi	Assistance in large-scale rituals
101	Nanda Sevaka	Support services in rituals
102	Pakhala Sevaka	Preparation of specific food offerings
103	Patali Sevaka	Ritual material preparation
104	Rosiaghara Sevaka	Kitchen maintenance
105	Sabara Sevaka	Tribal-associated ritual duties
106	Sankirtan Sevaka	Devotional singing
107	Satahara Sevaka	Assistance in offering rituals
108	Silpi	Artisan work for temple needs
109	Singha Dwara Pratihari	Guarding Lion Gate
110	Sunari	Goldsmith work for ornaments
111	Teli Sevaka	Oil-related services
112	Tini Badu	Assistance in cooking and service
113	Upara Khuntia	Upper-level guarding duties
114	Vaishya Sevaka	Trade and supply-related service
115	Vesha Mekap	Dressing and adornment of deities
116	Vimana Badu	Assistance in palanquin processions
117	Bimana Mekap	Maintenance of ceremonial vehicles
118	Bimana Suara	Food service during processions
119	Sarathi Sevaka	Chariot driving and coordination

These classifications represent a complex structure of ritual specialization integrated within the overarching caste system in India.

== Duties and functions ==
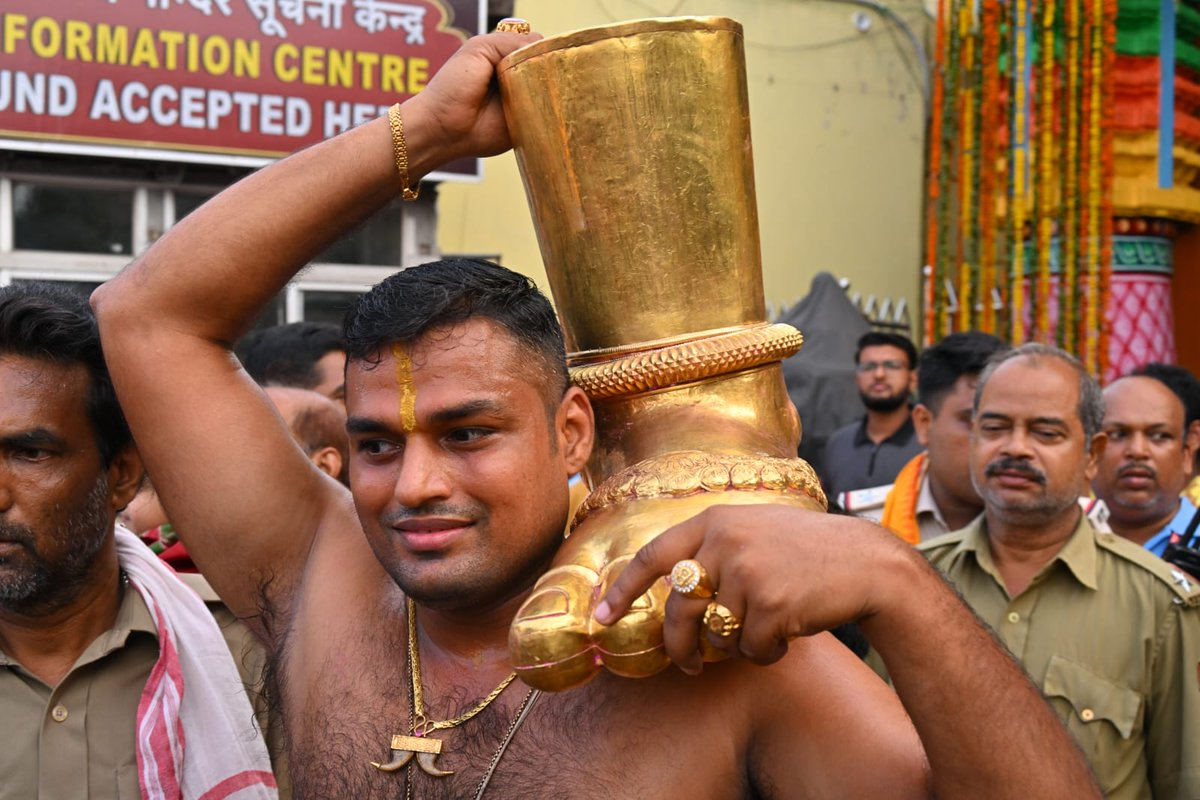
Sevayat carrying golden of Jagannath in Sri mandir

The Sevayats' duties cover a wide range of ritual, administrative, and service-related roles necessary for the day-to-day functioning of the temple. This includes conducting worship, preparing offerings, looking after the temple premises, managing pilgrim services and organizing festivals.

== Role in rituals and festivals ==
The Sevayats play a crucial role in the performance of daily rituals (nitis) and major festivals of the Jagannath tradition. Different groups of Sevayats perform specific duties during festivals like the Ratha Yatra, such as the formal handover of the deities, the construction of the chariots and making ritual offerings. For example, the Daita servitors play a big role during certain ritual phases, like Anasara, when the gods are thought to be sick and are taken out of public view for a short time.

== Legal status and rights ==
Both customary law and statutory regulation have had an impact on the legal status of Sevayats. The Shri Jagannath Temple Act, 1955 put the temple under state control and officially recognized the traditional rights and duties of Sevayats as they are written down in the Record of Rights.

There have been legal fights over service rights, pay, and administrative power from time to time. These fights show the tension between hereditary privilege and modern governance.

== Socio-economic conditions ==
The socio-economic conditions of Sevayats are different in different service groups. Some Sevayats earn a regular income and social standing through service at the temple, but others are economically unstable due to irregular pay and reliance on donations from pilgrims.

The traditional modes of livelihood have been significantly affected by the modern changes in temple administration, tourism and economic structures. For nearly nine centuries, despite social, economic, and political turbulent times, the Sevayats have persevered and came about as the most devoted and authentic guardians of this mystifying religious heritage.

== Customs and social life ==
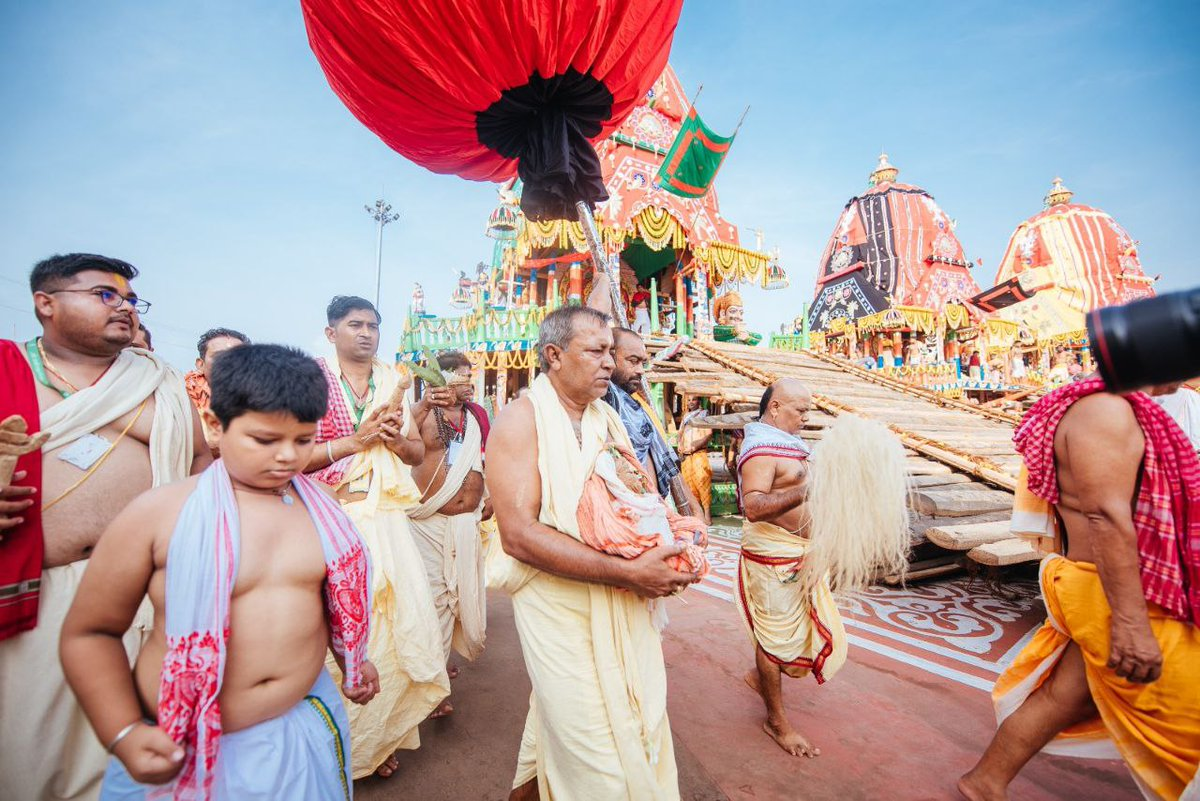
Sevayat of Srimandira in 2023 Puri Ratha Jatra

Sevayat communities have their own social and cultural practices that are shaped by their hereditary roles and ritual duties. It is common for people in subgroups to marry within their own group, and family identity is closely linked to certain temple services.

== Reforms and contemporary issues ==
The Sevayat system has gone through a number of changes in the modern era to make it more open, accountable, and efficient. State intervention, especially after the 1955 Act was passed, has added regulatory oversight to how temples are run.

== Cultural significance ==
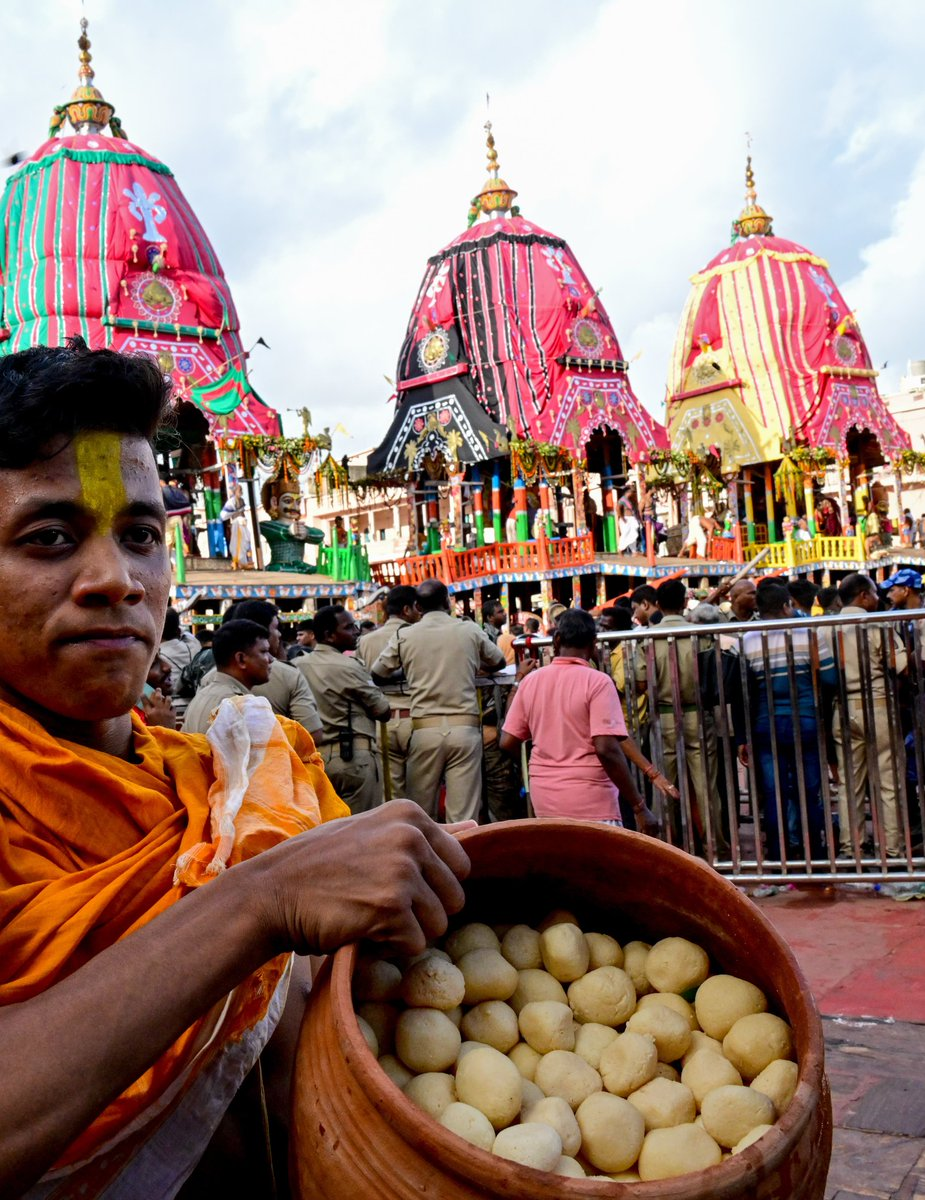
Sevayat of Lord Jagannath offering Rasagola to Mahaprabhu in 2024

The Sevayat system is a unique blend of religion, social organization and cultural continuity in the Jagannath tradition. It is a living heritage which links medieval temple practices with contemporary religious life in Odisha.

The Sevayats are important in safeguarding the ritual lore, oral tradition and cultural identity associated with the cult of Jagannath.

== Comparative perspective ==
There are similar systems of hereditary temple servitors in other Hindu temple traditions across India but the scale and complexity of the Sevayat system at Puri is unique.

Comparative studies indicate similarities with temple functionary systems in South India, in which roles are similarly organized according to ritual hierarchy and hereditary succession, but which are distinct in terms of administrative incorporation and regional differences in caste dynamics.

== Notable people ==
The individuals listed below are renowned for their involvement with the Jagannath Temple's Sevayat institution, either by hereditary service responsibilities or historically documented participation in its ritual system:

- Dibyasingha Deba – Gajapati Maharaja of Puri and Lord Jagannath's Adyasevak, or chief servant, who is considered the most important Sevayat in the ritual hierarchy.
- Sasimani Debi – considered the last known devadasi of the Jagannath Temple, belonged to a class of temple servants that is no longer in existence.

== See also ==
- Jagannath
- Jagannath Temple, Puri
- Ratha Yatra (Puri)
- Mandala Panji
- Shri Jagannath Temple Act, 1955
- Gajapati Empire
- Eastern Ganga dynasty
- Caste system in India
- Brahmin
- Puri
- Culture of Odisha
- Shri Jagannath Temple Managing Committee
