= Alamchandi Temple =

Coordinates: 19.818476°N 85.830812°E

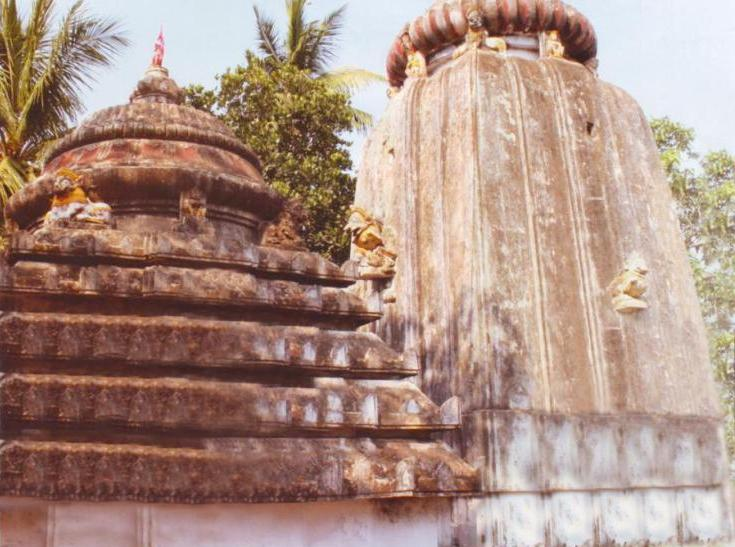
- Alam Chandi Temple

Religion
- Affiliation: Hinduism
- District: Puri
- Deity: Alamchandi
- Festival: Makar Sankranti

Location
- State: Odisha
- Country: India
- Interactive map of Alamchandi Temple

Alamchandi Temple is one of the Shakta shrines of Puri and is located in the Kumbharapara area near Atharanala Bridge of the Puri. Skanda Purana has made a reference to Goddess Alamchandi residing in the northern side of the Jagannath Temple, Puri to protect the Ratnavedi. Devi Alamchandi is generally considered as one of the Asthashaktis who protect the Antarvedi on the Nairuta (southwest) corner of Srikshetra. From an architectural point of view, this temple is not so significant but from the religious aspect it is one of the important Chandi shrines of Shreekhetra.

== History ==
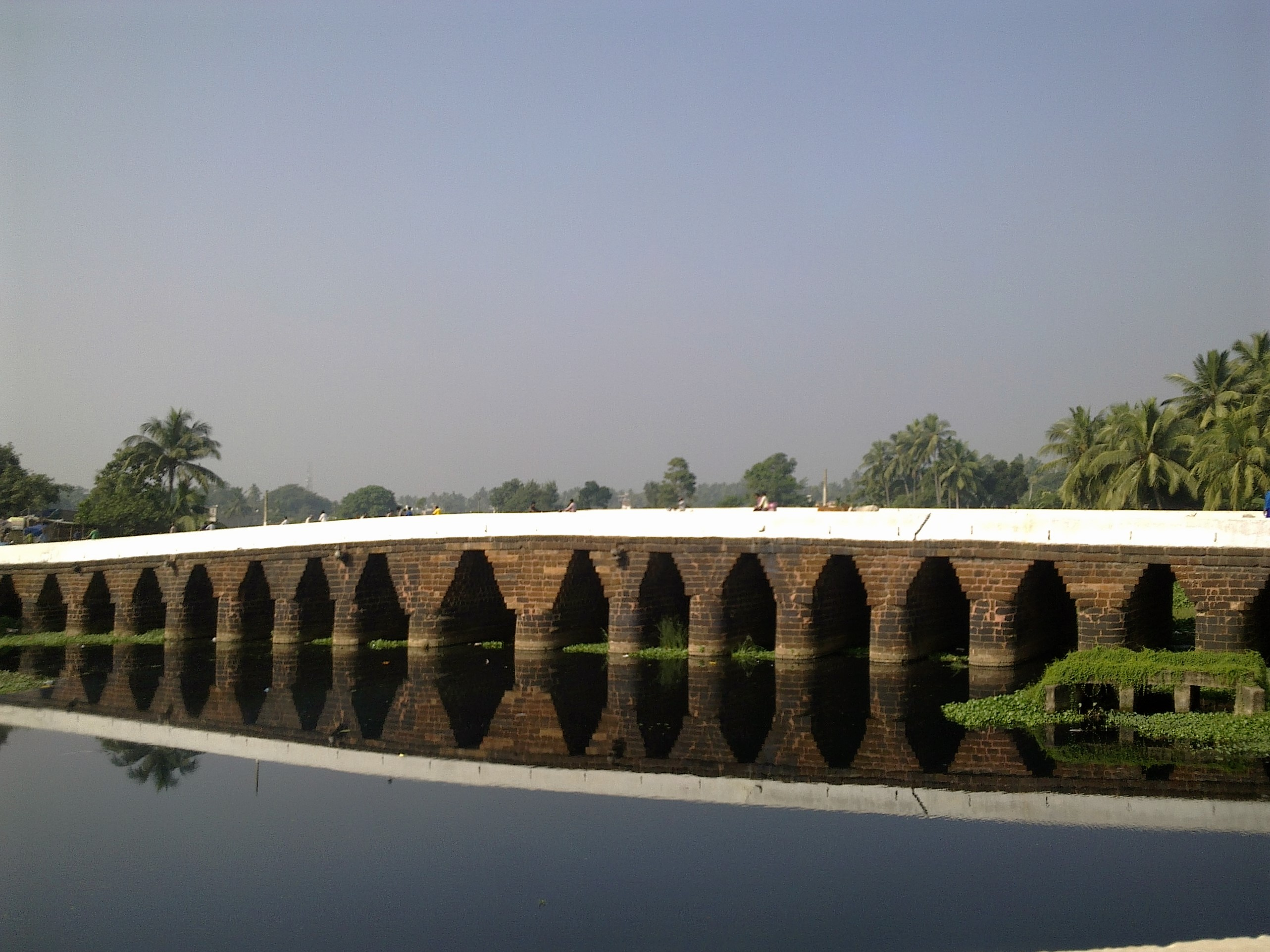
Atharanala bridge

There is no authentic historical record regarding the approximate date of the temple of Devi Alam Chandi. Dr. B.K. Ratha has mentioned that the Alam Chandi temple was constructed in the sixteenth century A.D. On the basis of the architectural features, the construction period of the temple can be tentatively assigned to the 2nd half of the 16th century A.D. However, the Natamandapa of the temple is built in the twentieth century.

== Nabakalebara & Alamchandi Temple ==
During the time of Nabakalebara, Darubrahmas (sacred logs) coming from different places were initially placed in front of the temple. After getting Agyanmala only the sacred logs enter into the city of Puri with a procession. The temple of Alamchandi is connected with the Saptapuri puja of Lord Jagannatha temple. On the day of Saptapuri Amabasya, Saptapuri is sent to this temple from the Jagannatha temple. for bhoga

== See also ==
- "Alamchandi Temple at Puri"
