= Dibyasingha Deba =

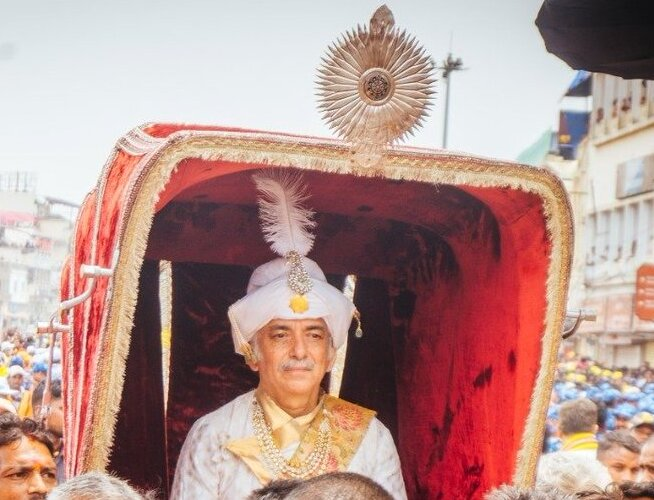

Chairman of Shri Jagannatha Temple Managing Committee
- Incumbent
- Assumed office 7 July 1970
- Preceded by: Birakishore III

Personal details
- Born: Kamarnaba Deba; June 2, 1953 (age 73) Puri, Orissa, India
- Spouse: Leelavati Patamahadei
- Children: Dibyajyoti Debi; Debajani Debi; Debika Debi; Debesi Debi
- Parents: Birakishore Deva III (father); Suryamani Patamahadei (mother)
- Education: Rajkumar College; St. Stephen's College; Delhi University; Northwestern University School of Law

37th Gajapati Maharaja of Odisha King of Puri and Khurda
- Reign: 7 July 1970 – current (titular)
- Predecessor: Birakishore Deva III
- House: Bhoi dynasty

Dibyasingha Deba, known by the symbolic regnal title as Gajapati Maharaja Divyasingha Deva IV, is the titular 37th Gajapati Maharaja and the King of Puri and Khurda. He is the current head of the house of the Bhoi dynasty, who were the hereditary rulers of the ancient realm of Trikalinga (regions of Kalinga, Utkal, Dakshin Koshala), medieval era Khurda Kingdom and the rulers of the Puri Estate, with their current capital located at Puri. The Gajapati Maharaja is the current Adhyasevaka (known as the first and foremost servitor) of Lord Jagannatha and among many rituals is involved in 'Chhera Pahara', the ritual involving the symbolic cleaning of the raths during Ratha Yatra (Puri). He is also the chairman of the Shri Jagannatha Temple Managing Committee of the Jagannath Temple at Puri.

== Early life ==
Dibyasingha Deba ascended the throne in 1970 at the age of 17 after the death of his father, Gajapati Birakishore Deba. Before taking the titular name of Dibyasingha Deba, he was named Jenamani Kamarnaba Deba. He did his schooling from Blessed Sacrament High School, Puri and Rajkumar College, Raipur in Chhattisgarh. He went on to pursue his graduation in History from the St Stephens College from where he graduated in 1972 and then pursued LLB from Law Faculty at University Of Delhi(1971-1975). He then pursued LLM from the Northwestern School of Law (1975-1976), Chicago before eventually taking on the traditional role of the titular King of Puri and hence the chairman of the Temple committee. Due to being abroad in Chicago in 1975-76, he skipped the Chhera Pahanra ritual that year. It was instead done by the Mudiratha servitor of the temple at that time.

== Regnal year (Anka year) ==
The regnal year (known as Anka year) of the Maharaja used for the corresponding Odia year in the Odia calendar (panjis):

Regnal & Anka year of Gajapati (titular reign since 7 July 1970)
Gregorian year	Regnal year	Odia year	Anka year
2026 CE	56	୧୪୩୪ ଉତ୍କଳାବ୍ଦ; 1434 Utkaḷābda	୭୧ ଅଙ୍କ; 71 Aṅka

- Utkaḷābda year for 2026 on 23 September.

== Temple administration and roles ==
As the titular head of the dynasty, the Gajapati Maharaja acts as the Chairman of the Shri Jagannath Temple Managing Committee and also attends to the rites and rituals of the temple during the festivals and religious occasions like Ratha Jatra, Bahuda Jatra, Pusyabhiseka, Snana Jatra and many other important socio-religious and cultural events. He also leads a team of scholars under the aegis of the Temple Administration named Shri Jagannatha Tatwa, Gabeshana O Prasara Upasamiti.

== See also ==
- Shri Jagannath Temple Managing Committee
- Jagannath Temple, Puri
- Sevayat
