= Ratha Yatra (Puri) =

Hindu Odia chariot festival dedicated to the deity Jagannath

Ratha Yatra of Puri
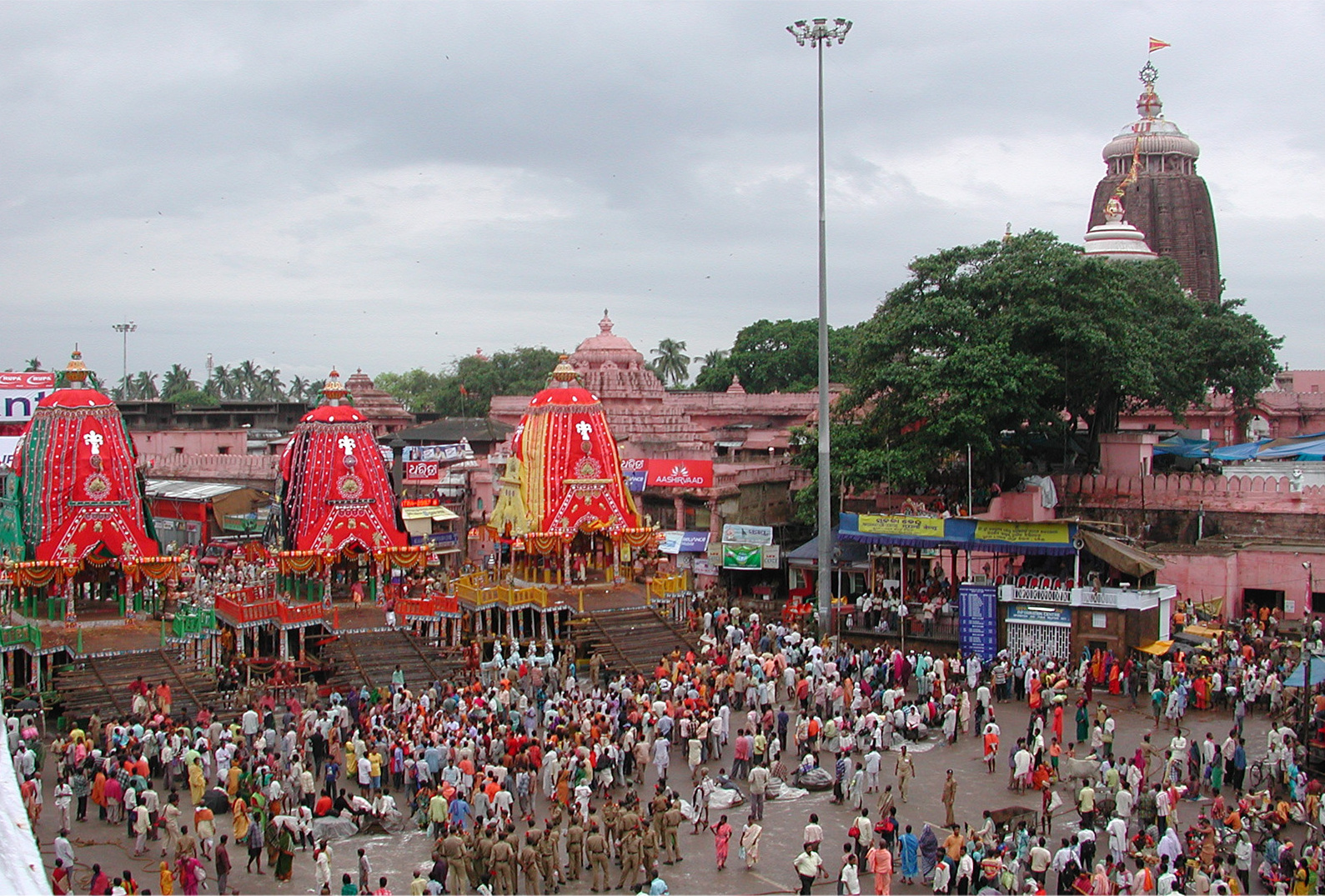
- Three chariots of the deities with the temple in the background, Puri
- Also called: Ghōṣå Yātrā
- Observed by: Hindu
- Type: Religious
- Significance: Represents the soul's journey towards salvation
- Begins: Āshādha Shukla Dvitiyā
- Ends: Āshādha Shukla Dashami
- 2025 date: 27 June, Friday
- 2026 date: 16 July, Thursday
- Duration: 1 week, 2 days
- Frequency: annual

The Ratha Yatra of Puri, also rendered as the Ratha Jatra (Odia: ରଥଯାତ୍ରା, romanized: Råthå-Yātrā, lit. 'Chariot Festival' or 'Car Festival') (/ˈrʌθə ˈjɑːtrɑː/, Odia pronunciation: [ɾɔt̪ʰɔ dʒat̪ɾa]), is considered the oldest and largest Hindu chariot festival celebrated annually, on the bright half of the lunar month of Ashadha (June–July).

The Ratha Yatra is held at the city of Puri, in the state of Odisha, India and associated with the deity Jagannath (a form of Vishnu). During the festival, three deities (Jagannath, his brother Balabhadra and sister Subhadra) are drawn by a multitude of devotees in three massive, wooden chariots on bada danda (Odia: ବଡ଼ଦାଣ୍ଡ, romanized: Båṛå-Dāṇḍå, lit. 'the grand avenue') to Gundicha Temple, whereby they reside there for a week and then return to the Jagnannath Temple. This return trip is referred to as the Bahuda Ratha Yatra. On their way back from the Gundicha Temple, the three deities stop for a while near the Mausi Maa Temple (lit. 'aunt's abode') and have an offering of the Podo Pitha, which is a special type of pancake supposed to be the deity's favourite. After a stay of seven days, the deities return to their abode.

== History ==
Descriptions of the Ratha Yatra can be found in Brahma Purana, Padma Purana, the Skanda Purana, and the Kapila Samhita. Records of the festival have been noted by European travelers since the 13th century, with the most prominent and vivid descriptions noted in the 17th century.

The annual festival has been celebrated for over 800 years. The exact date of the first Ratha Yatra is unknown, but mythological accounts trace it to King Indradyumma in the 12th to 13th centuries, under the Eastern Ganga dynasty.

The three chariots of Jagannath, Balabhadra and Subhadra are newly constructed every year with wood of specified trees like phassi, dhausa, etc. They are customarily brought from the ex-princely state of Dasapalla by a specialist team of carpenters who have hereditary rights and privileges for the same. The logs are traditionally set afloat as rafts in the river Mahanadi. These are collected near Puri and then transported by road.

The three chariots, decorated as per the unique scheme prescribed and followed for centuries, stand on the Bada Danda, the Grand Avenue. The chariots are lined across the wide avenue in front of the temple close to its eastern entrance, which is also known as the Singhadwara or the Lion's Gate.

Around each of the chariots are nine Parsva devatas, painted wooden images representing different deities on the chariots' sides. Each chariot has a charioteer (Sarathi) and four horses.

| Chariot Details | Jagannath | Balabhadra | Subhadra |
|---|---|---|---|
| Name of Chariot | Nandighosha (ନନ୍ଦିଘୋଷ) | Taladhwaja (ତାଳଧ୍ୱଜ) | Darpadalana (ଦର୍ପଦଳନ) |
| Alternates name of Chariot | Garudadhwaja, Kapidhwaja | Langaladhwaja | Devadalana, Padmadhwaja |
| Main Deity | Jagannath | Balarama | Subhadra |
| Image | | | |
| Number of wheels | 16 | 14 | 12 |
| Total Number of wooden pieces used | 832 | 763 | 593 |
| Height | 44' 2" | 43' 3" | 42' 3" |
| Length and breadth | 34'6" x 34'6" | 33' x 33' | 31'6" x 31'6" |
| Colours of the canopies | Red, Yellow (yellow associated with Vishnu) | Red, Bluish green | Red, Black (Black associated with the Goddess) |
| Guardian | Garuda | Vasudeva | Jayadurga |
| Charioteer | Daruka | Matali | Arjuna |
| Flag name | Trailokyamohini | Unnani | Nadambika |
| Flag emblem | | Palm Tree | |
| Name of Horses | 1. Shankha; 2. Balahaka; 3. Shweta; 4. Haridashwa | 1. Tibra; 2. Ghora; 3. Dirghasharma; 4. Swarnanava | 1. Rochika; 2. Mochika; 3. Jita; 4. Aparajita |
| Colour of Horses | White | Black | Red |
| Name of Chariot Rope | Sankhachudha Nagini | Basuki Naga | Swarnachuda Nagini |
| Accompanying deity | Madanmohan | Ramakrishna | Sudarshana |
| Gatekeepers (Dvarapala) | 1. Jaya; 2. Vijaya | 1. Nanda; 2. Sunanda | 1. Ganga; 2. Jamuna |
| Nine parshvadevata (Subsidiary deities) | 1. Panchamukhi Mahabir (Hanuman); 2. Harihara; 3. Madhusudana (Vishnu); 4. Giridhari (Krishna); 5. Pandu Narasingha; 6. Chintamani Krishna; 7. Narayana (Vishnu); 8. Chatra Bhanga Rabana (Rama); 9. Rama seated on Hanuman | 1. Nata Ganapati; 2. Kartikeya; 3. Hastina Balaram (Balaram); 4. Lakshman with Hanuman; 5. Pralambari (Balarama); 6. Haladhara (Balarama); 7. Dwavimsabhuj Narasimha; 8. Natamvara (Shiva); 9. Anantanag | 1. Banadurga; 2. Chamunda; 3. Bhadrakali; 4. Harachandi (Durga ) 5. Ramchandi (Durga); 6. Varahi; 7. Katyayani; 8. Mangala; 9. Vimala |

== Events in Yatra ==
=== Service offerings ===
Jagannath temple employs different kinds of sevakas who offer their services on the Ratha.

- Suara
- Mahasuara
- Dahuka: Ratha dahuka boli (Odia: ଡାହୁକ ବୋଲି, also "Dahuka gita" (ଡାହୁକ ଗୀତ)) which are poetic recitations. Ratha Yatra being a symbolic expression of fertility and Life cycle, these "boli" sung by the Dahuka contain bawdy songs. It is believed that unless the Dahuka boli is sung 'Ratha' does not move. These songs are sung publicly without any kind of hold on the lyrics. Dahuka controls the movement of Ratha during the festival.
- Daita pati
- Puspalaka
- Banati Players: Banati is an age-old art, in which a person spins balls set on fire and tied to the ends of a rope. Every year during the Rath yatra devotees perform "Banati" to appease Jagannath. Knives and fireballs, which are attached to the Banati add colour to the procession of the deity as it reaches its destination

=== Hera Panchami ===
Hera Panchami is a ritual observed during the period of Rath Yatra in the Grand Jagannath Temple of Puri. It is known as a ritual of Goddess Lakshmi. The fifth day from Rath Yatra, i.e., the fifth day in bright fortnight of Ashadha is known as the Hera Panchami. During Ratha Yatra, lord Jagannath comes out on a divine outing with his brother Balabhadra and sister Subhadra along with his divine weapon Sudarshana, leaving behind His wife Mahalaxmi. The Goddess expresses her anger for the deity. She proceeds to the Gundicha Temple, the Adapa Mandapa in a palanquin in the form of a Subarna Mahalaxmi and threatens Him to come back to the temple at the earliest. To please her, the deity concedes to her by offering her agyan mala (a garland of consent). Seeing the Goddess furious, the sevakas close the main door of the Gundicha. Mahalaxmi returns to the main temple through the Nakachana gate. In a unique ritual, the Goddess orders one of her attendants to damage a part of the Nandighosa chariot. This is followed by her hiding behind a tamarind tree outside the Gundicha Temple. After some time, she escapes to her home temple in secrecy, through a separate path way known as Hera Gohri Lane The unique ritual is enjoyed by lakhs of devotees of Jagannath. The rituals of Hera Panchami as an important function of Srimandira finds mention in Skanda Purana. According to the history of the Temple, this "utsav" started during the time of Maharaja Kapilendra Deb. Before his reign, the Hera Panchami function was being observed in a symbolic way with recitation of Mantras. As stated in Madala Panji, Raja Kapilendra Deb substituted this practice with the introduction of an idol of Mahalaxmi made of gold and making the celebration more realistic.

=== Chandana Yatra ===
The Chandan yatra or "Sandalwood Festival" is a 42-day period that marks the beginning of construction work for the chariots. The period is divided in half, consisting of 21 days each. The first half is known as Bahar chandan, whereby the representative images of the presiding deities are taken out in colorful processions and given a ceremonial boat ride in the Narendra tank every day. These deities include Madan Mohan (Jagannath), Rama-Krishna, Lakshmi, Saraswati and the Pancha Pandava - the presiding deities of the five main Shiva temples. The latter, known as Bhitar chandan, consists of various rituals not open to the public. The construction of the chariots starts on Akshaya Tritiya, the third day of the bright fortnight of Vaisakha, with ritual fire worship. This takes place in front of the palace of the King of Puri and opposite the main office of the Puri temple. Later the deities have a ritual bath in a small temple in the middle of the tank, in stone tubs filled with water, sandalwood paste, scents, and flowers.

The Snana Yatra or "Bathing Festival" which takes place on the full moon day of the month of Jyeshtha. The deities, Jagannath, Balbhadra and Subhadra are bathed with 108 pots of water and then remain in symbolic and ritual convalescence for about two weeks. They are barred from the view of the public. Only three special patta chitras, traditional Oriya paintings of natural colors on cloth stiffened with starch, known as Anasara Pattis, are strung on a bamboo screen hiding the deities from public view, can be seen by the public. During this period, the deities are given only roots, leaves, berries and fruits to cure them of their indisposition. This ritual is a reminder of the strong tribal elements in the genesis and evolution of the Jagannatha cult. The progeny of Lalita, daughter of the original tribal worshipper Biswabasu, chieftain of hunters, and the Brahmin priest Vidyapati, are known as daitapatis or daitas. They have the almost exclusive privilege of serving the deityduring the convalescence and through the entire period of Ratha Jatra or the Festival of Chariots.

=== Suna Besha ===
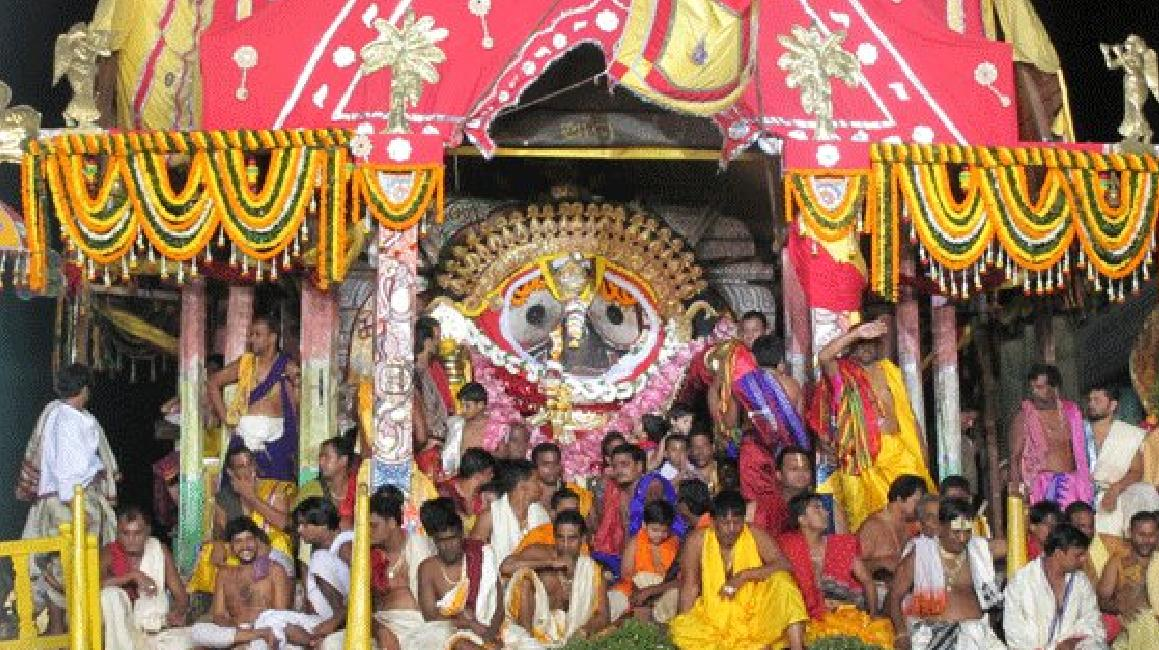
The Suna Besha of Jagannath

After the chariots of the deities return to the main temple from the Gundicha temple, the deities are attired in gold ornaments and worshipped on the chariots. This celebration is known as Suna Besha. Tradition maintains that this event was first started by King Kapilendra Deva in 1460, when after returning victorious from war he donated gold to Jagannath. The deities are adorned with gold jewelry weighing nearly 208 kg. In 2014 nearly nine hundred thousand devotees witnessed this event held on 9 July.

=== The Ratha Yatra and Pahandi of 2015 ===
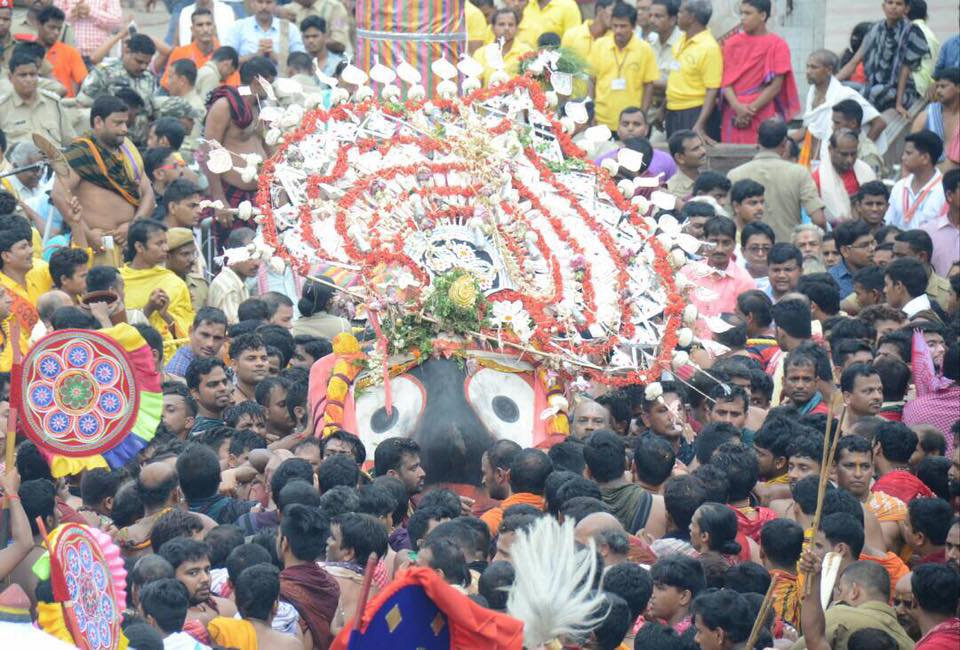
Pahandi of Jagannath during Rathajatra 2017.

In 2015 on the occasion of Rath Yatra, lakhs of devotees thronged the coastal town of Puri to catch a glimpse of the deities re-embodied after 19 years on chariots. This was the largest-ever religious congregation in Odisha.

== Rath Yatra of 2025 ==
The Rath Yatra of 2025 marked a significant shift in devotion with the integration of digital technology. Alongside the traditional physical gathering lakhs of devotees. A substantial number of people participated virtually through live streaming platforms, reflecting the emergence of a digital revolution in religious observance.

Key highlights of the 2025 Yatra included enhanced crowd management strategies implemented by local authorities, global live streaming that enabled wider participation, and a focus on environmental sustainability. Eco-friendly initiatives such as the use of biodegradable offerings and reduced single-use plastics were introduced, making the event more environmentally responsible than in previous years.

== Ratha Yatra dates ==
This table shows the dates for Ratha Yatra held in Puri, Odisha. These dates shows from the Year Nabakalebara, 2015 to the Year of next (After 19 years) Nabakalebara, 2034.

Ratha Yatra in Puri
| Year | Starting Date (Ashadha Shukla Dvitiya) | Ending Date (9th day Of Ratha Yatra) |
|---|---|---|
| 2015 (Nabakalebara, 2015) | 18 July | 26 July |
| 2016 | 6 July | 14 July |
| 2017 | 25 June | 3 July |
| 2018 | 14 July | 22 July |
| 2019 | 4 July | 12 July |
| 2020 | 23 June | 1 July |
| 2021 | 12 July | 20 July |
| 2022 | 1 July | 9 July |
| 2023 | 20 June | 28 June |
| 2024 | 7 July | 15 July |
| 2025 | 27 June | 5 July |
| 2026 | 16 July | 24 July |
| 2027 | 5 July | 13 July |
| 2028 | 23 June | 1 July |
| 2029 | 13 July | 21 July |
| 2030 | 2 July | 10 July |
| 2031 | 22 June | 30 June |
| 2032 | 9 July | 17 July |
| 2033 | 28 June | 6 July |
| 2034 (Nabakalebara, 2034) | 17 July | 25 July |

== See also ==
- Famous Hindu yatras
- Hindu pilgrimage sites in India
- List of Hindu festivals
- Padayatra
- Ratha Yatra
- Tirtha
- Tirtha and Kshetra
- Section-"Ratha Yatra rituals"
- Sevayat
- Shri Jagannath Temple Managing Committee
- Opet Festival - festival in ancient Egypt which included procession of statues of gods and deities
