= Dahuka boli =

Songs recited during the Ratha Yatra in Puri, Odisha

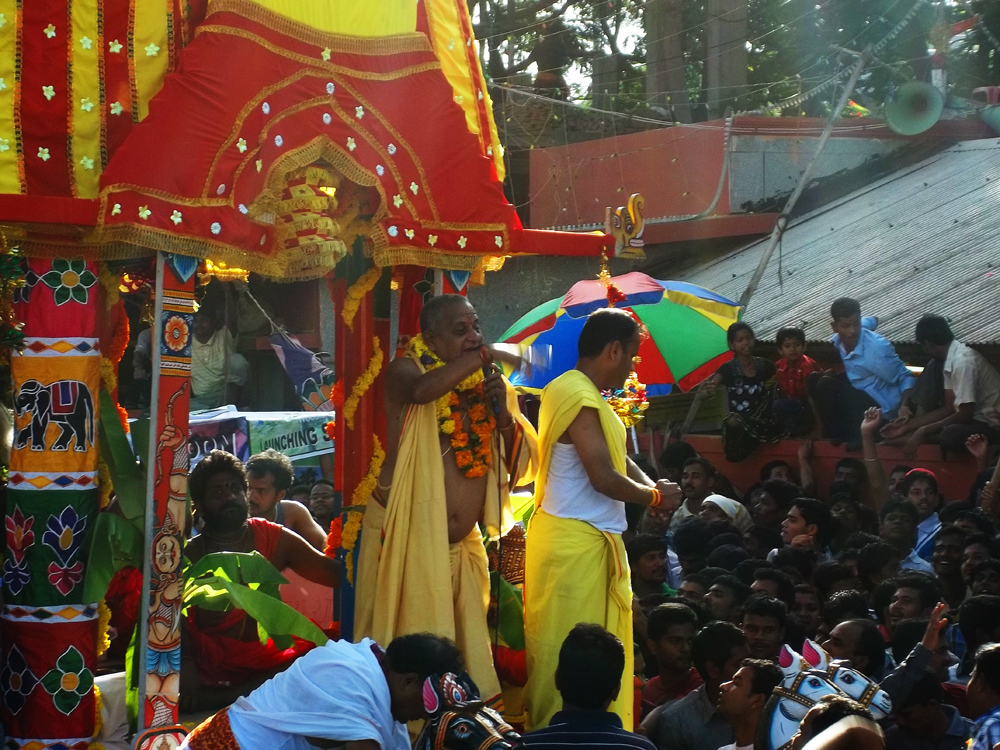
Dahuka reciting Dahuka boli on Ratha during Ratha-Yatra in Bangalore

Dahuka boli (Odia: ଡାହୁକ ବୋଲି, also "Dahuka gita" (ଡାହୁକ ଗୀତ)) are poetic recitations which Dahukas (or Ratha bhanda), the charioteers, recite during the Rath Yatra in Puri, Odisha. Ratha Yatra being a symbolic expression of fertility and Life cycle, these "boli" sung by the Dahuka contain bawdy songs. It is believed that unless the Dahuka boli is sung 'Ratha' doesn't move. These songs are sung publicly without any kind of hold on the lyrics. Dahuka controls the movement of Ratha during the festival. The Dahukas are believed to be the descends of the famous 84 Mahasiddhas.

== Lyrics samples ==
Odia	English (transliteration)
ମାରି ଶାଶୁ ନଣନ୍ଦ ଘରେ ଶାଳୀ	māri sāsu naṇanda gharē sāḷi
ମାଅ ମାରିଆ କାହ୍ନୁ ଭଇଲ କବାଳୀ	māa māriā kāhnu bhaila kabāḷi

Odia	English (transliteration)
ହୋ ଭଗତେ! ହୋ..	hō bhagatē hō
କାଳୀ ଗୋରୀ ଦିହେଁ ଗାଧୋଇ ଗଲେ,	kāḷī gōrī dihē gādhōi galē
ଗଛରୁ ଖସିଲା ଡାଳ,	gacharu khasilā ḍāḷa
କାଳୀ କହୁଛି ଗୋରିଲୋ	kāḷī kahuchi gōrilō
ତୋ ବିଆରେ ନାହିଁ ବାଳ ॥	tō biārē nāhi bāḷa

Odia	English (transliteration)
ହୋ ଭଗତେ! ହୋ..	hō bhagatē hō
ହାଡ଼ୁପା କହିଲେ ବାଇ ଏଠାର,	hāḍupā kahilē bāi ēthara
ଯୋନି ଦରଶନ ସୁଖ ଅପାର ।	jōni daraśana sukha apāra
ଭଗରେ ବାଜିଲେ ଲିଙ୍ଗର ମୁଣ୍ଡି,	bhagarē bājilē liṅgara muṇḍi
ତିନିଧାର ନାଳ ନିଅଇ ତେଣ୍ଡି ।	tinidhāra nāḷa niai tēṇḍi
ଛ ଗଣ୍ଠି ଭେଦଇ ସେ ନାଳ ଯେବେ,	cha gaṇṭhi bhēdāi sē nāḷa jēbē
ରମଣ କରିବୁ ଭଗତେ ତେବେ ॥	ramaṇa karibu bhakata tēbē

== History ==
"Dahuka boli" have many derivatives from Charyapada. One of the earliest Dahuka boli by Kanhapa is as follows:

ମାରି ଶାଶୁ ନଣନ୍ଦ ଘରେ ଶାଳୀ
ମାଅ ମାରିଆ କାହ୍ନୁ ଭଇଲ କବାଳୀ

Roman transliteration:

māri sāsu naṇanda gharē sāḷi
māa māriā kāhnu bhaila kabāḷi

In the "Swatwalipi (Odia: ସ୍ୱତ୍ୱଲିପି) or Adhikara abhilekha (Odia: ଅଧିକାର ଅଭିଲେଖ) service no 104 there is the description of Dahuka and their service on "Ratha" There is no description of such service in "Purusottama mahatmya" in Skandha purana. But there are descriptions of "Dahuka" in Purusottama Karmangi.

=== Text from Purusottama Karmangi ===
ଏ ଭୂଇଁ ଭୋଗୀ। ଏମାନେ ରଥବେଳେ ରଥ ଚଳାଇବେ। ମୋଡ଼ ବୋଲିବେ। ଅକଥା କହି, ପରମେଶ୍ୱର ରଥ ରୋକି, ରଥଗତି ଉଣ୍ଡି, ବେତ ଚଳାଇ ମୋଡ କଥା କହିବେ। ସେ ସମସ୍ତ ଚାଳିବେ। କଳା ବେଠିଆ ରଥ ସେହିମତେ ଚଳାଇବେ।”

— Purusottama Karmangi

The boli/dahuka boli were also called as "Tucha pada" (ତୁଚ୍ଛ ପଦ), "Bhanda gita" (ଭଣ୍ଡ ଗୀତ) or "Bakra gita" (ବକ୍ରଗୀତ). During the earlier 20th century Jagadeba Mishra, a poet from Puri has written about the "Dahuka boli" his book "Sahari jalam":

Odia	English (transliteration)
ରଥେ ଭଣ୍ଡ ଡାକ ଛାଡନ୍ତେ ଡାହୁକ	rathē bhaṇḍa ḍāka chāḍantē ḍāhuka
ବକ ସିଆଣିଆ ଲୋକ	baka siāṇiā lōka
ଅରକ୍ଷିତ ଯାକ ଶୁଣିବାକୁ ରଙ୍କ	arakhita yāka suṇibāku raṅka
ନମାନିଲେ ଶୋଷ ଭୋକ	namānilē sōsa bhōka

== Ban on Dahuka boli ==
During 1995 The Jagannatha temple trustee officials banned the recitation of Dahuka boli. Apart from few exceptions since 1997, Dahukas never sung Dahuka gita.

== See also ==
- Charyapada
- Rath Yatra
- Jagannatha
