= Shri Jagannath Temple Act, 1955 =

Act of the Odisha Legislative Assembly

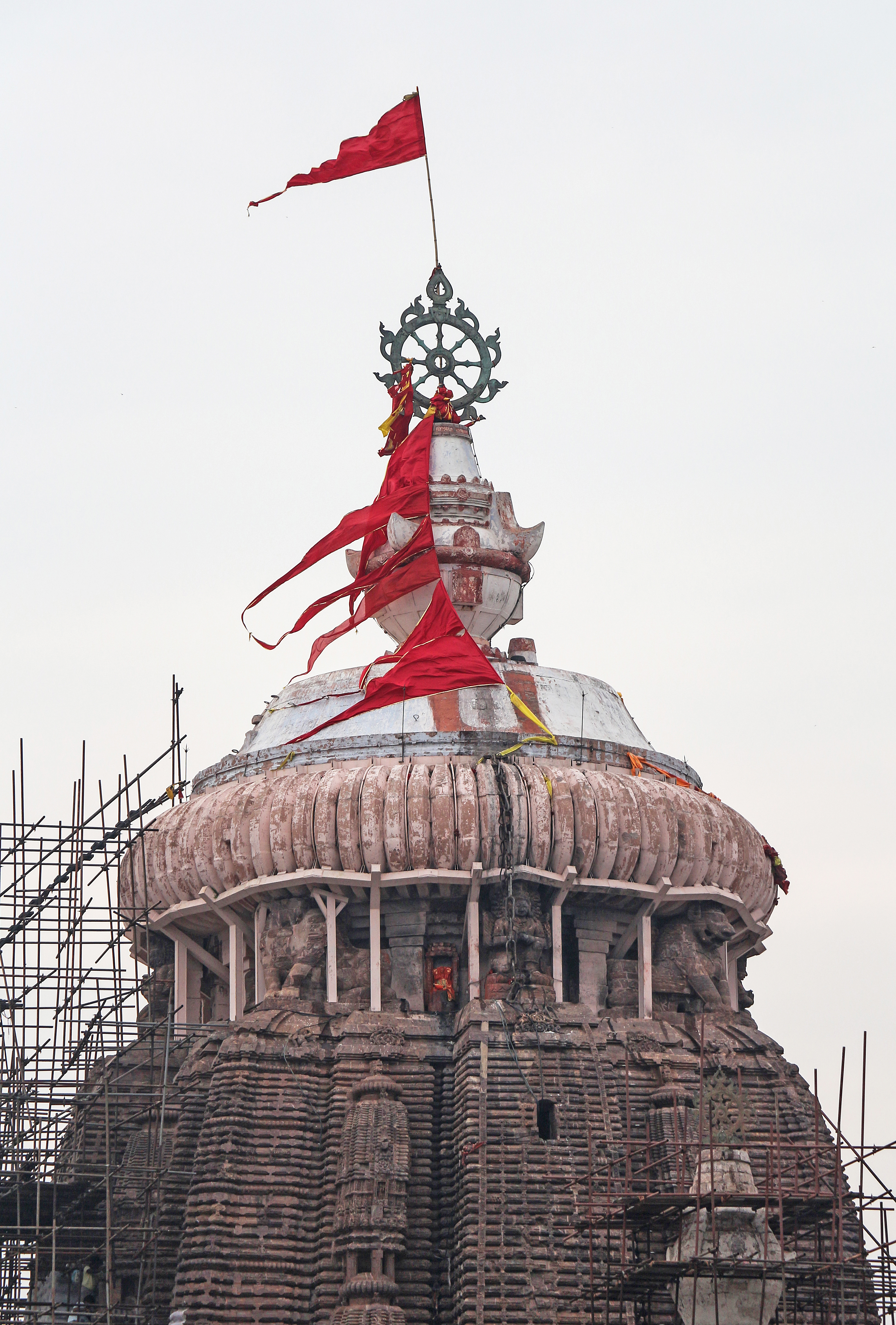

Odisha Legislative Assembly
- Long title: An Act to confer upon the Odisha Government certain powers to control the management and affairs of the Jagannath Temple at Puri (ODISHA)
- Citation: Act No. 11 of 1955
- Enacted by: Odisha Legislative Assembly
- Commenced: 27 December 1960

Amended by
- Act No. 10 of 1983

The Shri Jagannath Temple Act, 1955 is an Act of Odisha Legislative Assembly enacted to control the management and affairs of the Jagannath Temple at Puri.

== History ==
With the British occupation of Odisha in 1803, the management of the Jagannath Temple was taken over by the East India Company. From 1806 on wards the Temple was managed by a body headed by three Brahmins who are called Pundits locally. But later in 1809, the body was abolished and the management of the Temple was transferred to the then Raja of Khurdha (now known as the King of Puri). King Birakishore Dev was issue-less. After his death in 1859, his widow queen was authorized to manage the affairs of the temple as the adopted son was a minor. The period saw utter dislocation in the management of the temple. The management of the temple became deteriorated even after the king attained majority. So in 1885 the British filed a suit to takeover the management of the temple. The suit was hotly contested by the renowned lawyer of the time, Utkal Gourav Madhusudan Das and the suit was decreed in favour of the queen. As per the deed of compromise, the affairs of the temple was looked after by a competent manager till the grandson, Mukund Dev attained majority. Things did not improve even after Mukund Dev attained majority. So a Deputy Magistrate was appointed to manage the affairs of the temple during the lifetime of Mukund Dev. After the death of Mukund Dev, the management of the temple was transferred to Raja Ramachandra Dev. The king removed senior gazetted officers from the management of the temple for which the management of the temple continued to be deteriorated. During the period, India got independence and the Government of Orissa felt that some legislative measures are to be taken to restore the religious pride of the institution.

== Development ==
Foundation of a sound administrative system was laid down by Bhoi King Ramachandra Dev who declared himself as Gajapati Maharaja of Khurdha in 1571 CE. Since then his descendants has been looking after the affairs of the Temple as Thakura Rajas. After independence, the State Government, with a view to getting better administrative system, passed The Puri Shri Jagannath Temple (Administration) Act, 1952. It contained provisions to prepare the Record of Rights and duties of Sevayats and such other persons connected with the system of worship and management of the temple. Subsequently, Shri Jagannath Temple Act - 1955 was enacted to reorganize the management system of the affair of the temple and its properties. The Act was brought into force with effect from 27.12.1960.

The enactment of the above Act was challenged by Gajapati Ramchandra Deva-IV claiming his entitlement over the temple and deity with the plea that as his forefathers had constructed and consecrated the temple and deity. Ultimately Hon'ble Supreme Court of India rejected the prayer of the king on 27 Oct, 1960. Hence Government of Orissa took over the charge of the Temple.

== Salient features ==
=== Committee ===
In terms of the provision of this Act, the management, administration and governance of the temple vests in a Committee known as Shri Jagannath Temple Managing Committee which consists of the following :

1. Gajapati Maharaja of Puri - Chairman
2. Collector and D.M., Puri - Vice-Chairman
3. Administrator, Shri Jagannath Temple - Ex-officio-Member
4. Commissioner of Endowments - Ex -officio-member
5. One person to be nominated by the State Government from among the persons entitled to sit on the Muktimandap - Member
6. Four persons to be nominated by the State Government from among the sevaks of the temple - Members
7. One person representing the Mathas and other institutions connected with the Seva Puja or Nities of the temple to be nominated by the State Government.
8. Two persons to be nominated by State Government From among Persons who do not belong to any of the categories i.e. 5, 6, and 7 - Member

=== Important Sections ===
- As per sec.21-A of the Act:

All sevaks, office-holders and servants attached to the Temple or in receipt of any emoluments or perquisites there from shall, whether such service is hereditary or not, be subjected to the control of the Administrator who may, subject to the provisions of this Act and the regulations, made by the Committee in that behalf, after giving the person concerned a reasonable opportunity of being heard

- a: withhold the receipt of emoluments or requisites;
- b: impose a fine of an amount not exceeding two hundred rupees;
- c: suspend; or
- d: dismiss; any of them for breach of trust, incapacity, disobedience of lawful orders, neglect of or willful absence from duty, disorderly behavior or conduct derogatory to the discipline or dignity of the Temple or for any other sufficient cause.

Under this provision two of the Sevayats were suspended for the alleged delay in Brahm paribartana during the Nabakalebara 2015.

== Amendments ==
The Act was amended in 1983 under Orissa Act no. 10 of 1983 by inserting Section 28-B and 28-C to the Act.

== See also ==
- Jagannath Temple, Puri
- Ratha Yatra (Puri)
- Sevayat
