= Nabakalebara =

Recreation of the four deities at Jagannath Temple, Puri, India

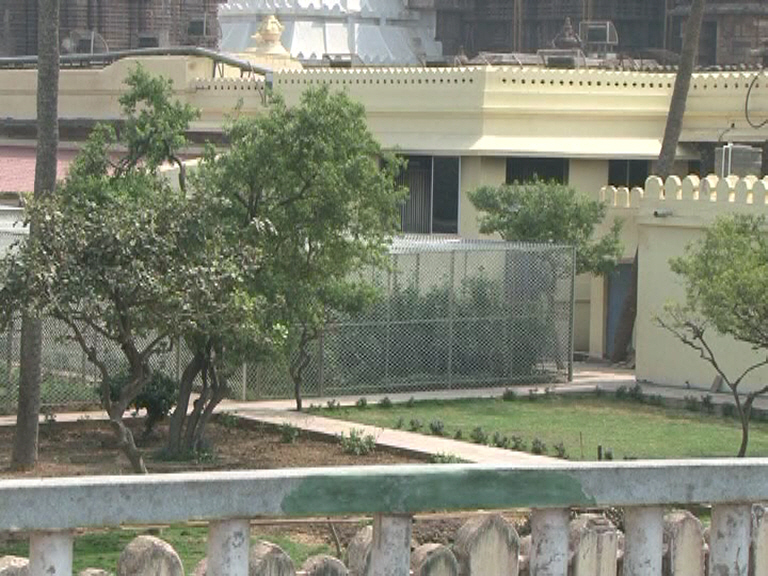
The Koili baikuntha garden; the site of the Nabakalebara ritual is in the foreground.

Nabakalebara also spelled as Navakalevara (Odia: ନବ କଳେବର) is the ritualistic recreation of the wooden icons of four Hindu deities (Jagannath, Balabhadra, Subhadra, and Sudarshana) at Jagannath Temple, Puri. The ritual is performed during the 8th, 12th, or 19th year after the previous Nabakalebara.

Nabakalebara is an important festival in the Hindu Odia calendar, observed in the Jagannath Temple, Puri. It was first organised in 1575 A.D by Bhoi King Ramachandra Deva, his eldest son Padmanava Pattanaika had first performed the Nabakalebera ritual in Barunei fort of Khordhagarh. Deulakarana and Tadhaukarana subdivisions of Karanas play an important part in this ritual as representatives of Gajapati Raja, they guard the temple premises with the special sword (Pata Khanda) of Lord Jagannath in their hands. It marks the symbolic demise and rebirth of Jagannath at Puri. The event involves installation of new idols in the Jagannath temple and burial of the old ones in the temple premises at Koili Baikuntha.

== Etymology ==
Nabakalebara is a combination of two Odia words: naba (new) and kalebara (body), translated as "new embodiment."

== Timing ==
The year of Nabakalebara is when the full moon occurs twice during the month of Ashadha. Every three years in the Hindu calendar, a lunar month is excluded from the calculation to maintain a balance between lunar and solar years. This period is called Adhikmasa or Malamasa. A year with an extra month (अधिकमास or मलमास or पुरुषोत्तममास )is considered auspicious for the ceremony, which typically occurs every twelve to nineteen years. The three deities undergo the process of Nabakalebara in the year in which the adhikmasa falls. The deities are carved from a special type of neem wood, known as daru bramha. Preparations for the ceremony begin in the month of Chaitra. The most recent ceremony was in 2015, 19 years after the 1996 ceremony. Over three million devotees were expected to visit the temple during the Nabakalebara 2015.

=== Jirna bera parityaga ===
Jirna bera parityaga (Odia: ଜୀର୍ଣ୍ଣବେର ପରିତ୍ୟାଗ) means "the leaving of the old deity and the consecration of the new". As a person puts on new garments and gives up the old, the soul accepts new material bodies and gives up old, useless ones. According to temple rituals, the deities are changed. Made from the neem tree, musk, sandalwood and other combinations, they undergo a change before the adhika ashadha ends. Agama shastras followed in other parts of India for Vishnu worship, such as the Vaikhanasas, also prescribe the change of wooden deities under a specific astrological combination. Deities made of stone or metal do not need to be changed (unless they are damaged), but wooden deities must be changed within a specific number of years and their power must be ritually transferred. Nabakalebar is about the transformation of the Puri temple and Universe lords into a new body. The new wooden idols of Jagannath, Balabhadra, Subhadra and Sudarshan are welcomed to the temple in celebration. The old idols are ritually buried in Koili Baikuntha in accordance with century-old Odia scriptures.

== Nabakalebara 2015 ==
The Nabakalebara 2015 began with the Bana Jaga Jatra in March. The Holy Darus were identified and brought to Puri. For details, see the separate Wikipedia article.

== Finding the sacred trees ==
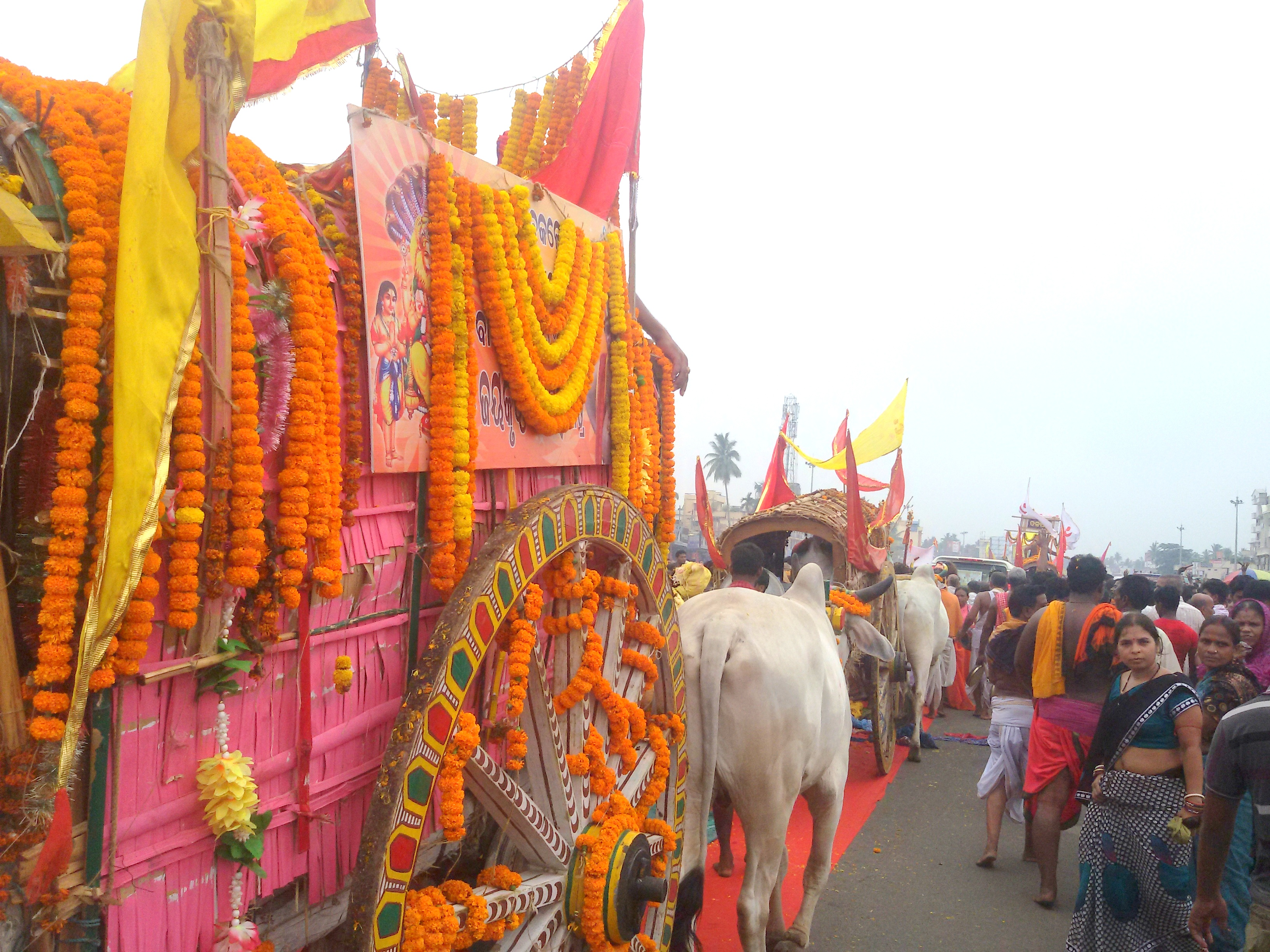
Carts transporting the holy trees to the Banajāga Jātra

Ordinary neem trees cannot be used to make the deities. For the identification of the tree, conditions and signs are taken into account.

The daru (log) of Sudarshan should have three branches. The skin (bark) of the neem tree should be reddish. The tree should have a chakra (wheel) with a small depression in the middle. The daru of Balabhadra should have seven branches. The bark of the tree should be light-brown or white. It should have the sign of a plow and pestle on it. Near the tree should be a heritage site and a graveyard. The daru of Subhadra should have five branches, and its bark should be yellowish. There should be a lotus flower on the tree. The daru of Jagannath should have four main branches, and its bark should be dark. The tree should have a Shankha and a chakra on it. There should be a cremation ground and an anthill near the tree, and a snake hole at its roots. The tree should be near a river, pond, a three-way crossing or three mountains. There should not be birds' nests on the tree, and no bird should have perched on the tree. The tree should be surrounded by other trees, and there should be a temple to Shiva in the vicinity. The tree should be free of parasitic plants and creepers.

Symbols for selection of the darus
Deity	Bark colour	Branches	Sign	Nearby
Bhagwan Jagannath	Dark	4	Shankha an chakra	Cremation ground, anthill near the tree and snake hole at the roots of the tree, river/pond/three-way crossing/three mountains, no nests or perches, surrounded by other trees, Shiva temple, free of parasitic plants and creepers
Bhagwan Balabhadra	Light brown/white	7	Plow and pestle	Heritage site and graveyard
Devi Subhadra	Yellowish	5	Lotus flower	
Sudarshan Chakra	reddish	3	Chakra with small depression in centre	

Places from which darus were obtained for Nabakalebara
Year	Shree Jagannath	Balabhadra Ji	Devi Subhadra	Sudarshan Chakra
16 July 1912	Prataprudrapur	Niali	Polar Mahal	Fetehgarha
17 July 1931	Gabapada	Satwikpur	Niali	Kakatpur
16 July 1950	Khadihara	Nuapatna	Durgeswar	Jalarpur
16 July 1969	Champajhar	Bhakar Street	Kanhupur	Balara
18 July 1977	Raichakradharpur	Bhogeswar	Baraboi	Niali
17 July 1996	Dadhimachhagadia	Ramakrushnapur	Malada	Bisoidiha
18 July 2015	Kharipadia	Kanakpur (Sarala Temple Premises)	Adanga	Gadakuntania

== Rituals ==
The search group announces where the logs are located in order; the last is Jagannath's tree. Security is arranged by the government of Odisha. The trees are ritually cut down, and the logs transported in small carts to the temple in Puri, where they are carved into deities. At midnight on Chaturdashi, the tattva Padārtha is transferred from the old deities to the new. This process happens in secrecy, all other servitors are removed from the temple premises except for the "Pati" and "Daitapati" servitors, Deula Karana and Tadhau Karana servitors of the Karana community also remain present in the temple premises along with Gajapati Maharaja as his representatives and guard the temple premises with their swords. The new deities are worshipped, and the old ones are buried in sand.

Rituals and mythology are attached to Nabakalebara. The procedure for the transformation of images was mentioned in Sanskrit manuscripts, written on palm leaves and kept in the temple. The temple's three head priests are charged with reading and interpreting them.

The images of Jagannath must be made of wood. Since the deity is dark, the neem tree from which his image is carved should be dark also. The trees used for the images of his brother and sister are lighter in color, since his siblings are fair in complexion.

Jagannath's tree must have four principal branches, symbolizing the four arms of Narayana. No branches are broken or cut. The tree must be located near a three-way intersection or surrounded by three mountains. A hermitage and a temple to Shiva must be nearby, and natural impressions of a conch-shell and chakra (wheel) must be on the trunk.

After the tree is felled, sections are selected for carving and the remainder is buried; the location is then considered sacred. The logs are placed in a wooden six-wheeled oxcart and transported to the temple, where they are kept in the koili vaikuntha (koili means "burial ground", and vaikuntha means "heaven"); the old deities are buried, and the new ones made. After the transfer of essence, the old images are considered lifeless.

Carving of the images begins with the three oldest of the nine main wood carvers working on Jagannath. The images of Lord Balabhadra and Devi are simultaneously carved by two three-person teams. More than 50 carpenters assist the carvers. The work is done in secret, and not even the temple's head priest is allowed to visit the workplace. The carving enclosure is open on the top, but closed with strong doors. The carvers are not supposed to eat, drink or smoke in the enclosure. The carvings are completed in 21 days, during which the carvers are not supposed to leave the temple; they sleep in the temple courtyard, and eat mahaprasad. Devotional songs are sung by devadasis, accompanied by temple musicians, outside the koili vaikuntha during the carving period; shlokas from the Vedas are chanted by Brahmin priests.

After the new deities are made they are brought into the temple's inner sanctum, they are placed in front of (and facing) the old ones. No puja is performed at this time, and no food is offered. The images are life-sized, and very heavy. The transformation ceremony takes place three days before the chariot festival.

At midnight, the old deities are carried out and buried in the koili vaikuntha before dawn. Although the other deities have separate graves, the previous Jagannath deities are buried on top of each other.

On the morning of the second day, the new deities are seated on the altar. The temple's daily routine resumes after nearly 58 days (the search and carving periods). Sweet-smelling flower garlands and new garments are given to the new deities, food is offered, and a puja is performed; devotees can again enter the temple. On the third day, the new deities emerge from the temple for the chariot festival. Nabakalebara attracts millions of people from around the world to Puri, and is one of India's largest festivals.

== See also ==
- Bisara Mohanty
- Shri Jagannath Temple Managing Committee
