= Eastern Ganga dynasty =

Medieval of Indian royal dynasty (493–1947)

Eastern Ganga dynasty Purba Gangas, Rudhi Gangas or Prachya Gangas
- 493–1077 AD (Kalinga); 1077–1436 AD (Trikalinga); 1436–1947 AD (Khemundi)
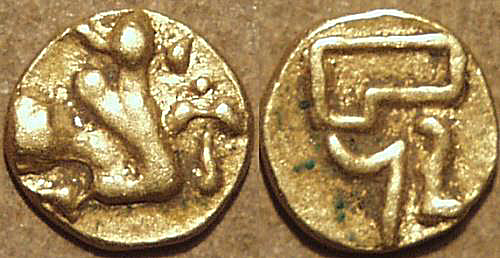
- Eastern Ganga Fanam of king Anantavarman Chodaganga (Anka year 63–1128 AD)

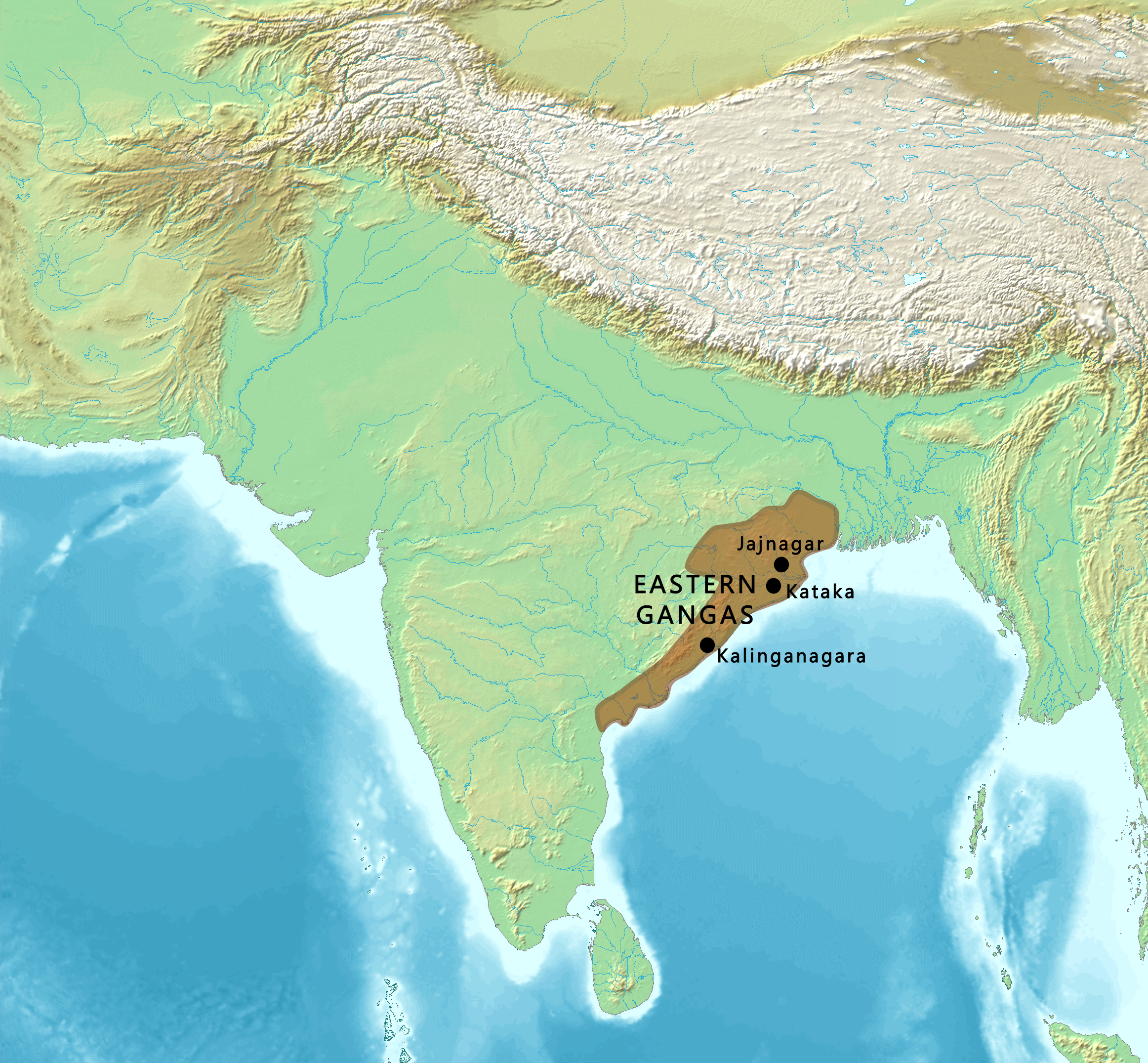
- Map of the Eastern Gangas, circa 1400 AD.
- Status: Kingdom (Note: In the context of Medieval Indian history (especially after the 11th century), it is often described as an empire, reflecting its wider influence and territorial reach.)
- Capital: Kalinganagara; Dantapura; Kataka; Paralakhemundi
- Common languages: Odia (court language, literature, early and later medieval period); Telugu (early period); Sanskrit (religious); Other Indian languages
- Religion: Hinduism; Shaivism; Vaishnavism; Buddhism
- Government: Monarchy
- Tri-Kalingadhipati Gajapati
  - 493–532: Indravarman I (first)
  - 1078–1150: Anantavarman Chodaganga
  - 1211–1238: Anangabhima Deva III
  - 1238–1264: Narasingha Deva I
  - 1736–1771: Jagannatha Gajapati Narayana Deo II
  - 1913–1947: Krushna Chandra Gajapati (last)
- Historical era: Classical India
  - Established: 493 AD
  - Malwese invasion: c. 1422
  - Sharqi invasions: c. 1444
  - Disestablished: 1947 AD
- Currency: Ganga Fanams
Preceded by
Pitrbhakta dynasty
Somavamshi dynasty
Mathara dynasty
Succeeded by
Gajapati Empire
Bhoi dynasty
- Today part of: India

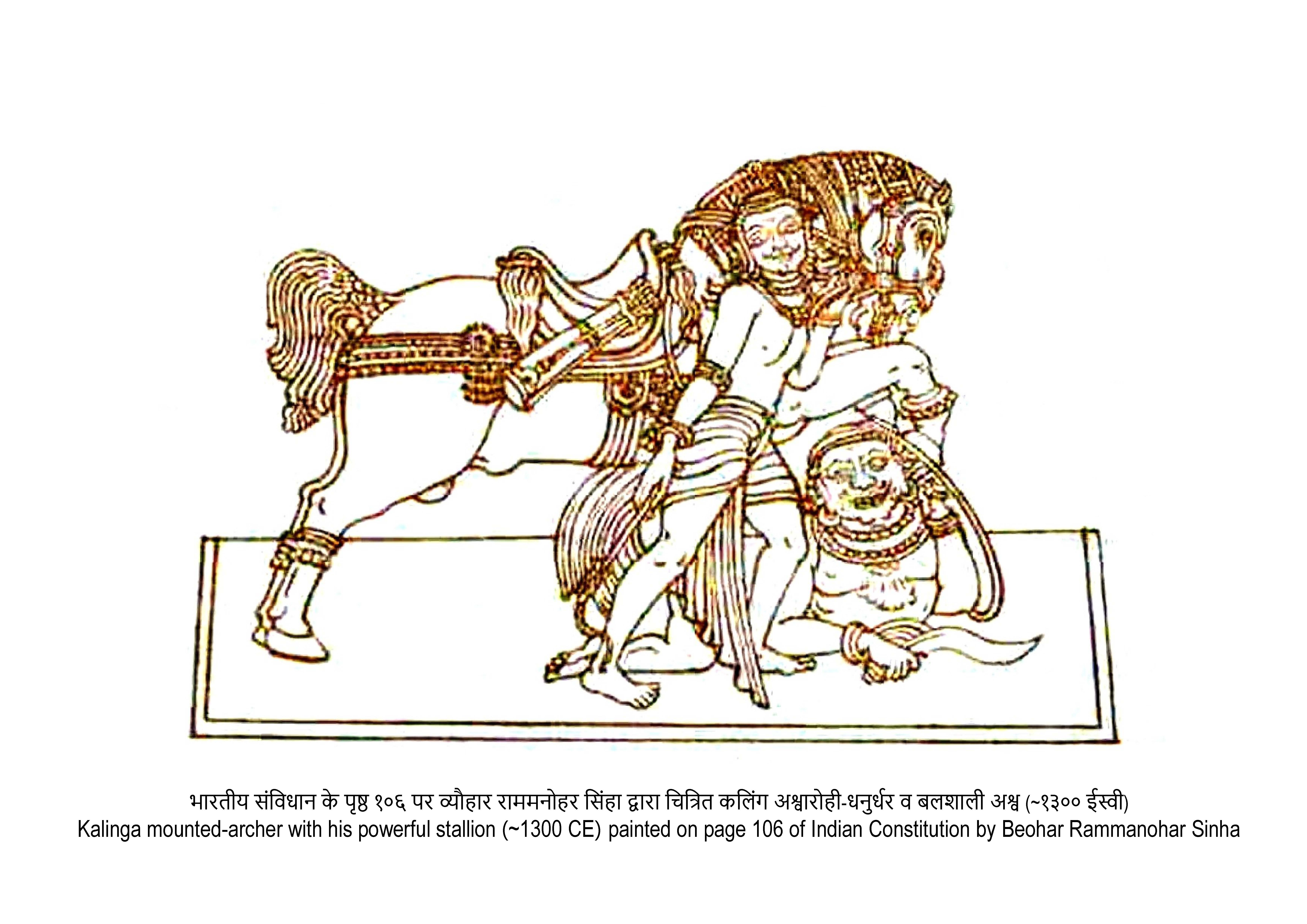
Illustration of a Kalinga mounted archer with a stallion, from the calligraphic Constitution of India (page 106).

The Eastern Ganga dynasty (also known as Purba Gangas, Rudhi Gangas or Prachya Gangas) were a large medieval era dynasty that reigned from Kalinga from as early as the 5th century to the mid 20th century. They are known as "Eastern Gangas" to distinguish them from the Western Gangas who ruled over Karnataka. The territory ruled by the dynasty consisted of the whole of the modern-day Indian state of Odisha, as well as major parts of north Andhra Pradesh, parts of Chhattisgarh and some southern districts of West Bengal. Eastern Gangas ruled much of the modern region of Odisha in three different phases by the passage of time, known as Early Eastern Gangas (493–1077), Imperial Eastern Gangas (1077–1436) and Khemundi Gangas (1436–1947). Odia language became the official and court language of Eastern Gangas. The early rulers of the dynasty ruled from Dantapura (modern Dantapuram in the Srikakulam district in Andhra Pradesh), the capital was later moved to Kalinganagara (modern Mukhilinga in Andhra Pradesh), and ultimately to Kataka (modern Cuttack in Odisha) and then to Paralakhemundi (in Odisha).

Today, they are remembered as the builders of the world renowned Jagannath Temple of Puri and Konark Sun Temple situated in Odisha, as well as the Madhukeshwara temple of Mukhalinga, Nrusinghanath Temple at Simhachalam in Andhra Pradesh, and Ananta Vasudeva Temple at Bhubaneswar. The Gangas have constructed several temples besides the ones mentioned above.

The rulers of Eastern Ganga dynasty defended their kingdom from the constant attacks of the Muslim invaders. This kingdom prospered through trade and commerce and the wealth was mostly used in the construction of temples. The rule of the dynasty came to an end under the reign of King Bhanudeva IV (c. 1414–34), in the early 15th century and then Khemundi Ganga started ruling up to abolition of zamindari in modern India. The Eastern Ganga dynasty is said to be the longest reigning dynasty in Odisha. Their currency was called Ganga Fanams and was similar to that of the Cholas and Eastern Chalukyas of southern India.

== Origin ==
As per B. Masthanaiah, the origin of the Eastern Gangas is not clearly established. However, renowned British scholar, artist, art critic, historian, archaeologist, and an authority on Indian art and architecture, Percy Brown, suggested that the temples of Mukhalingam predated the temples of Bhubaneswar and had been built as per the Badami Chalukya Temple Architecture originating from Karnataka since the 4th century CE. A certain temple tower in Odisha shows a combination of both Rekha and Pidha Deul decoration types which was taken from the Kadamba temples of Karnataka where it first appeared. The Mukhalingam (Kalinganagara) Madhukeswara (Mukhalingeswara) temple too resembles the Kadamba temples of Karnataka. The towns of Aihole, Badami and Pattadakal had emerged as 'The Cradle of Indian Temple Architecture and Hindu Rock Architecture, Stone Artwork and Construction Techniques' since the 4th century CE. The script used by the Eastern Ganga king Indravarma of the 7th century CE, like his predecessors, is the common Telugu-Kannada script used also by the Chalukyas of Badami and their related offshoot Vengi Chalukya branch. All these indicate a strong proof for the Eastern Gangas having originated from the earlier Western Gangas (established c. 350 CE) of Karnataka.

According to the historian Upinder Singh, In the 4th century CE, Orissa was divided into several small principalities, some of which owed allegiance to the Guptas. Dynasties such as the Pitribhaktas, Matharas, and Vasishthas rose to power in southern Orissa. The 5th century saw the rise of the Eastern Gangas in south Kalinga. These kings were probably a branch of the Western Gangas and were migrants from Karnataka.

The Eastern Gangas and main South Asian polities in 1175, on the eve of the Ghurid Empire invasion of the subcontinent.

The Korni and Vishakhapatnam copper plates of 1113 AD and 1118/1119 AD respectively both of Anantavarman Chodaganga, the Dasgoba copper plate of Rajaraja III of 1198/99 AD and the Nagari copperplate of Anangabhima III and other such records trace the ancestry of the Eastern Gangas to Kamarnava I. The Kendupatna copper plate of Narasimhadeva II and the Puri copper plate of Narasimhadeva IV also state that Kamarnava came from Gangawadi province, now in Karnataka. The Korni copper plate mentions that Kamarnava I came to the Mahendra mountain situated to the east of Gangawadi and then onwards to Kalinga. It also states that Kamarnava I, the eldest son of Virasimha, had left Kolahalapura (Kuvalalapura or Kolar), the capital of Gangawadivisaya (Western Ganga kingdom in southern Karnataka) after giving up his rightful throne to his paternal uncle. He set forth eastwards along with his four brothers to establish a new kingdom, reached and ascended the mountain summit of Mahendra, worshipped Shiva as God Gokarnaswamin or Gokarneswara, obtained the bull (Nandi) emblem, descended to the eastern side, defeated and killed the local tribal king Sabaraditya (Savaraditya) or Baladitya in battle and acquired the whole of Kalinga with the blessings of Gokarneswara. Historian Bhairabi Prasad Sahu states that the Gangas after conquering the area south of Mahendragiri mountain around 498–500 CE, acknowledged a deity of the Saora (Savara or Sabara) tribe on the Mahendragiri mountain with the name of Shiva-Gokarnaswamin as the patron deity of their family.

Epigraphist, John Faithfull Fleet has identified Gangawadi and Kolahalapuram with the Ganga Dynasty (founded in 350 CE) and Kolar, ruled by the Western Gangas. Both the early and the later Eastern Ganga kings had close relations with the Eastern Kadambas, who functioned under them as chieftains, heads and provincial governors. Most of the early as well as the later Eastern Ganga kings of Kalinga worshipped the holy feet of Gokarneswara of Mahendragiri. This deity also has a strong Karnataka connection through the Mahabaleshwar Temple situated in Gokarna (Karnataka) which is the only Atmalinga of God Shiva in the entire world. The Eastern Kadamba family, feudatories of the Early Gangas in the 10th and early 11th century CE, were ruling a small area in the vicinity of the Mahendra mountain.

Historian Dineshwar Singh lists several facts that point to a relationship between the Eastern and the Western Gangas. Just as the Gangas and the Kadambas of Karnataka had marital relationship with each other, so were the Gangas and the Kadambas of Kalinga. The family God of the Kadambas of Vaijayanti (Banavasi), Palasige and Hangal (all in Karnataka) is described in their inscriptions as Jayanti (Vaijayanti) Madhukeshwara of Banavasi. Historian M. Somasekhara Sarma suggests that the Kadambas brought with them their family God Madhukeshwara into their new home Kalinga. It appears that Kamarnava II built the temple of Madhukeshwara in Nagara at the instance of one of his feudatories and relatives, the Eastern Kadambas. Historian G. R. Varma further suggests that the Eastern Ganga king Kamarnava II renovated the existing temple of Gokarneshwara before renaming it as Madhukeshwara. Historian R. Subba Rao states that the God Madhukeswara of Kalinganagara was also called Jayanteswara (based on Vaijayanti or Banavasi town) or Gokarneshwara (Gokarna's Mahabaleshwar deity) in some of the inscriptions found in that temple. Somasekhara Sarma states that the Eastern Kadambas probably came to Kalinga from the districts of Dharwad, Belagavi and Ratnagiri. He substantiates it by showing the presence of a village named as a crude distortion of the Kannada place name Palasige (Halasi or Palasi in Old Kannada), as Palasa (Palasika) in the Kalinga region. Most of the early Western Gangas were Shaivas, just like the early and the later Eastern Gangas of Kalinga were.

Also, while the bardic traditions of the Western Ganga dynasty claim descent from the Sun through the Ikshavaku dynasty, the Eastern Ganga genealogies ascribe descent from the Moon; the Chandravamsa lineage. Unlike the Western Ganga Dynasty who traced their lineage to the Solar Dynasty, the Later Eastern Gangas claimed a lunar descent from Vishnu through Brahma, Atri and Chandra (moon).

Dineshwar Singh concludes that in spite of the views and arguments against a relationship between the two Ganga dynasties - the Western and the Eastern Gangas, the similarities listed out between them strongly indicate that the founder of the Eastern Ganga dynasty travelled from the Gangawadi province of Karnataka and arrived in Trikalinga. Historians R. S. Sharma and K. M. Shrimali state that several ruling families of Kannada origin flourished and ruled Odisha like the Eastern Gangas, the Eastern Kadambas, the Rashtrakuta branch of Odisha which ruled from Vagharakotta fort probably in the Sambalpur region and the Tailapa-Vamsis (ruled around Ganjam and Parlakimidi) who migrated during or after 973 CE on the establishment of the Kalyani Chalukya empire and were their feudatories. Some suspect them to have come along with Vikramaditya VI's campaigns across north, central, east and north east India, sometime before 1063–68 CE.

Five prominent dominions of the Kalingan Prachya Ganga family are identified from five different administrative centers namely – Kalinganagara (Srikakulam), Svetaka Mandala (Ganjam), Giri Kalinga (Simhapur), Ambabadi Mandala (Gunupur, Rayagada) and Vartanni Mandala (Hinjilikatu, Ganjam). The heartland of the Prachya Gangas had three parts of Kalinga namely, Daksina Kalinga (Pithapura), Madhya Kalinga (Yellamanchili Kalinga or Visakhapatnam) and Uttara Kalinga (districts of Srikakulam, Ganjam, Gajapati and Rayagada). The earliest known prominent king was Indravarman who is known from his Jirjingi copper plate grant. The Godavari grant of Raja Prthivimalla and the Ramatirtham grant of Vishnukundina king Indrbhattaraka refer to a war of four tusked elephants or Chaturdanta Samara in which Indravarman I the son of Mitavarman, a Ganga general of Vakataka king and a local ruler of Dantapura commanded an alliance of small South Kalingan kingdoms against the powerful Vishnukundina king Indrabhattaraka, defeated and killed him. The Vishnukundins returned with a vengeance, defeated the Vakataka King and members of the alliance while Indravarman declared himself as Tri-Kalingadhipati (the lord of the three Kalingas) rising from obscurity and moving his capital northwards away from the attacking Vishnukundins. His son Hastivarman found himself stuck between two Gupta feudal dynasties of Odisha, the Vigrahas of South Toshali and Mudgalas. Joining the onslaught like his father, he commanded major battles against the Vigrahas and won territories in the northern parts of ancient Kalinga and declared himself as Sakala-Kalingadhipati (the ruler of whole Kalinga). The dynasty though remaining to be a strong ruling family in ancient Odisha and North Andhra Pradesh continued to remain as vassal rulers under the central authority of the Bhauma-Kara dynasty which is proven by the fact that a smaller Eastern Ganga king belonging to the clan and named as Jayavarmadeva mentioned himself as the vassal of Sivakara Deva I in his Ganjam grant and by whose permission he gave away the grants.

It was during the rule of Anantavarman Vajrahasta V in the mid eleventh century that the clan started emerging as a major military power challenging the authority of the Somavanshi Dynasty at their northern frontiers and allying with their arch rivals the Kalchuris.

After a series of victories in battle and making land grants to three hundred Brahmin families in his kingdom, Vajrahasta V assumed the titles as Trikalingadhipati (lord of the three Kalingas) and Sakalakalingadhipati (lord of complete Kalinga) challenging the centralized authority of the Somavanshis and laying the foundation to an imperial era for the Eastern Gangas.

In the later years of the century, Devendravarman Rajaraja I defeated the Somavanshi king Mahasivagupta Janmenjaya II completely while challenging the Cholas in battle, along with establishing authority in the Vengi region.

The Cholas were defeated by Rajaraja I and Chola princess, Rajasundari, was married off to the Eastern Ganga king as a goodwill gesture for settlement of affairs between the Cholas and the Gangas.

== History ==
=== The Early Gangas ===
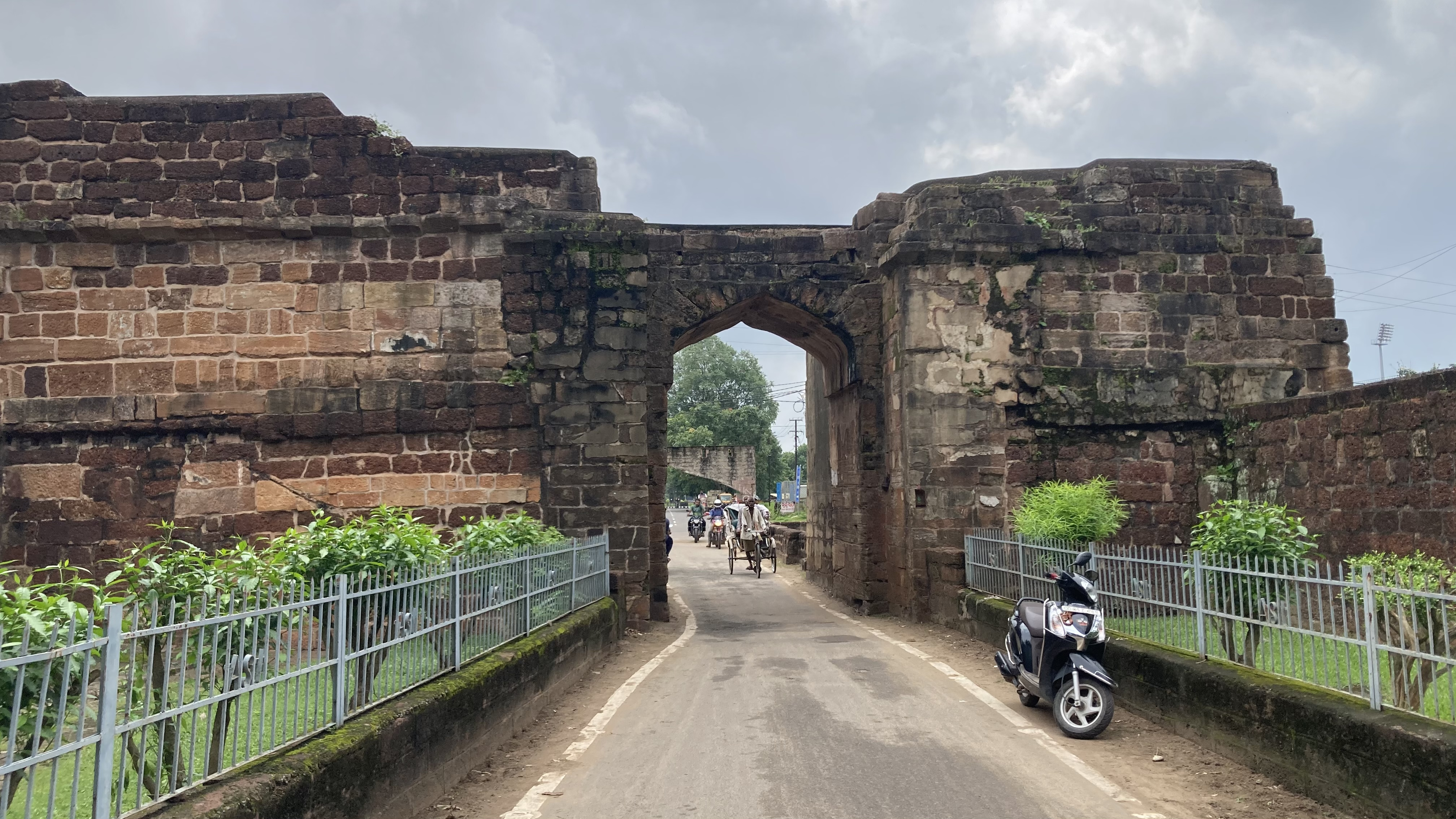
Ancient Barbati fort Capital of Eastern ganga dynasty

After the fall of Mahameghavahana dynasty, Kalinga was divided into different kingdoms under feudatory chiefs. Each of these chiefs bore the title Kalingadhipathi (Lord of Kalinga). The beginnings of what became the Eastern Ganga dynasty came about when Indravarma I defeated the Vishnukundin king, Indrabhattaraka and established his rule over the region with Kalinganagara (or Mukhalingam) as his capital, and Dantapuram as a secondary capital. The Ganga kings assumed various titles viz. Trikalingadhipathi or Sakala Kalingadhipathi (Lord of three Kalinga or all three Kalingas namely Kalinga proper (South), Utkala (North), and Dakshina Kosala (West)).

Mukhalingam near Srikakulam of Andhra Pradesh bordering Odisha has been identified as Kalinganagara, the capital of the early Eastern Gangas.

After the decline of the early Eastern Gangas reign, the Chalukyas of Vengi took control of the region. The first monarch of the dynasty Vajrahastha Aniyakabhima I (980–1015 A.D), took advantage of the internal strife and revived the power of the Ganga dynasty. It was during their rule that Shaivism took precedence over Buddhism and Jainism. The magnificent Srimukhalingam Temple at Mukhalingam was built during this period.

In the 11th century, the Cholas brought the Ganga Kingdom under their rule with the sudden death of Devendravarman Rajraja I. His son Chodaganga Deva who ascended the throne at the age of five under the protection provide by one of his maternal uncles from the Chola family had to overcome multiple obstacles before securing Kalinga, Vengi, Utkala, Odra and parts of Bengal as one kingdom.

The Eastern Gangas were known to have intermarried with the Cholas, Chalukyas. The early state of the dynasty may have started from the early 5th century.

=== The Imperial Gangas ===
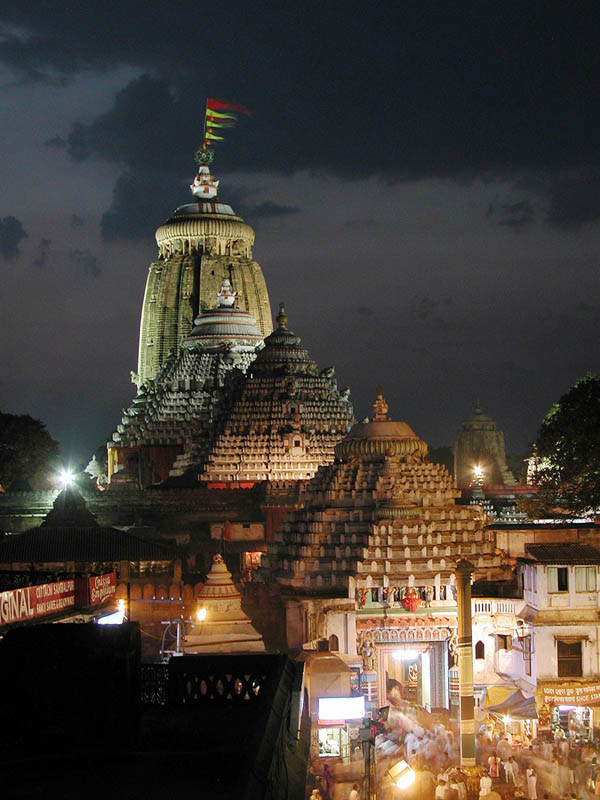
Jagannath Temple at Puri, built by Maharaja Anantavarman Chodaganga Deva.

Anantavarman Chodaganga Succeeded his father in 1078 AD, In the initial years of his reign his kingdom was attacked by the Cholas of the south and for a while Chodaganga lost to them a part of his kingdom comprising the Visakhapatnam district, but he did not lose heart and gradually recovered his lost territories. Anantavarman also captured Utkala (Northern Odisha) from the Somavamshi Kings. Anantavarman also went further east wrestling with the Pala Empire king Ramapala, He defeated the chief of Mandara, pillaged his capital Aramya, modern Arambagh (Hooghly District), and pursued him up to the bank of the Ganga, During these wars he seems to have received the co-operation of Vijayasena, a ruling chief in Radha.

He is believed to have ruled from the Ganges River in the north to the Godavari River in the south, thus laying the foundation of the Eastern Ganga Dynasty. Also during his rule, the great Jagannath Temple at Puri was built. He assumed the title of Trikalingadhipathi (ruler of the three Kalingas which comprise Kalinga proper, Utkala north and Koshala west) in 1076 CE, resulting in him being the first to rule all three divisions of Kalinga.

He was succeeded by Kamarnava VII who was his oldest son, During his reign he fought with the Kalachuris of Ratnapura for the possession of the Sambalpur-Bolangir Tract but was unsuccessful.

Kamarnava Deva was succeeded by rulers like Raghava, Raja Raja II, and Anangabhima II however, their reigns were uneventful.

Rajaraja III succeeded his father in 1198 AD, In 1205 Bakhtiyar Khalji sent Muhammad Sheran Khalji with a portion of his forces towards Jajnagar Muhammad Sheran advanced as far as Lakhnauti and hurriedly went back without invading Odisha after the death of his master Bakhtiyar Khalji. Therefore, the first invasion of Muslims in Odisha was unsuccessful.

Anangabhima III came to throne in 1211, In his reign he conquered the west part of Odisha known as the Sambalpur-Bolangir Tract, which was in hold of the Kalachuris of Ratnapura which had a long history of battles from the times of Anantavarman Chodaganga. Vishnu the commander of Gangas side is said to have fought the battle with the haiyayas in the bank of Bhima, In the Chateshwar Temple Inscription it is stated that Vishnu, the Brahmin minister of Anangabhima III, frightened the king of Tummana so much so that the latter perceived him (Vishnu) everywhere in his kingdom.

Anangabhima III also fought with the Governor of Bengal, Ghiyasuddin Iwaz Shah who attempt to conquer Orissa in his reign, but was repulsed by the Orissan army. The Tabaqat-i Nasiri states that the Muslim Governor of Bengal took tribute from the Orissan king, but this statement has been rejected by all scholars. Orissa remained unmolested by the Muslims during the reign of Anangabhimadeva

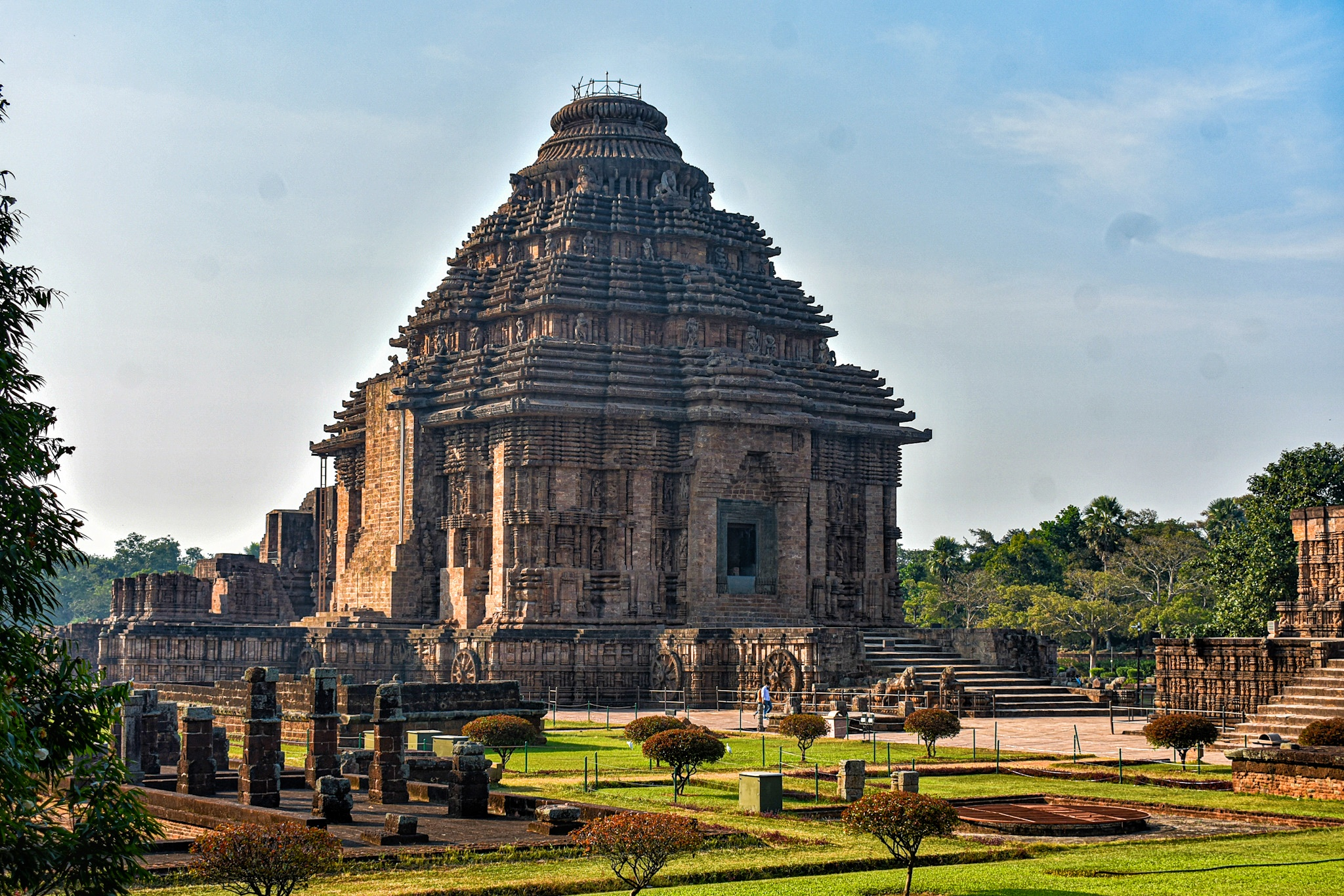
Main Temple Structure, Konark Sun Temple

Narasimhadeva I, the son of Anangabhima, was one of the most powerful kings of Ganga dynasty he believed in aggressive invasions, he captured Lakhnor and ended the Muslim rule in Radha, Narasimhadeva I advanced to Varendra as far as Lakhnawati in 1245. He sieged the capital city but the siege was short lived as the Bengal Sultan requested reinforcements from the Delhi Sultanate. He built The Sun Temple at Konark to commemorate his victory. Narasimhadeva I was also the first king to use the title of "Gajapati" or "Lord of war elephants" or "King with an army of elephants" among the Odishan kings in the 1246 CE inscription at the Kapilash Temple.

With the death of Narasimha in 1264, the Eastern Gangas began to decline; the sultan of Delhi, Firuz Shah Tughlaq, invaded Odisha between 1353 and 1358, and levied tribute on the Ganga king. The Musunuri Nayaks defeated the Odishan powers in 1356. Narasimha IV, the last known king of the Eastern Ganga dynasty, ruled until 1425. The "mad king," Bhanudeva IV, who succeeded him, left no inscriptions; his minister Kapilendra usurped the throne and founded the Suryavamsha dynasty in 1434–35.

== Administration and Military system ==
The Government of the Ganga empire was monarchial. The empire was divided into several provinces known as Maha mandalas each being governed by a governor called a Mahamandalika. Each Mahamandala is divided into several mandalas. Again these mandalas were subdivided into units called Visayas which were like modern day districts and were ruled by a Visayapati. At local government level, every village or grama was a self governing unit. The Gramas were led by a Gramika. There were different village officials such as Karanika (accountant), Dandapani (police officer), Gramavatta (village watchman).

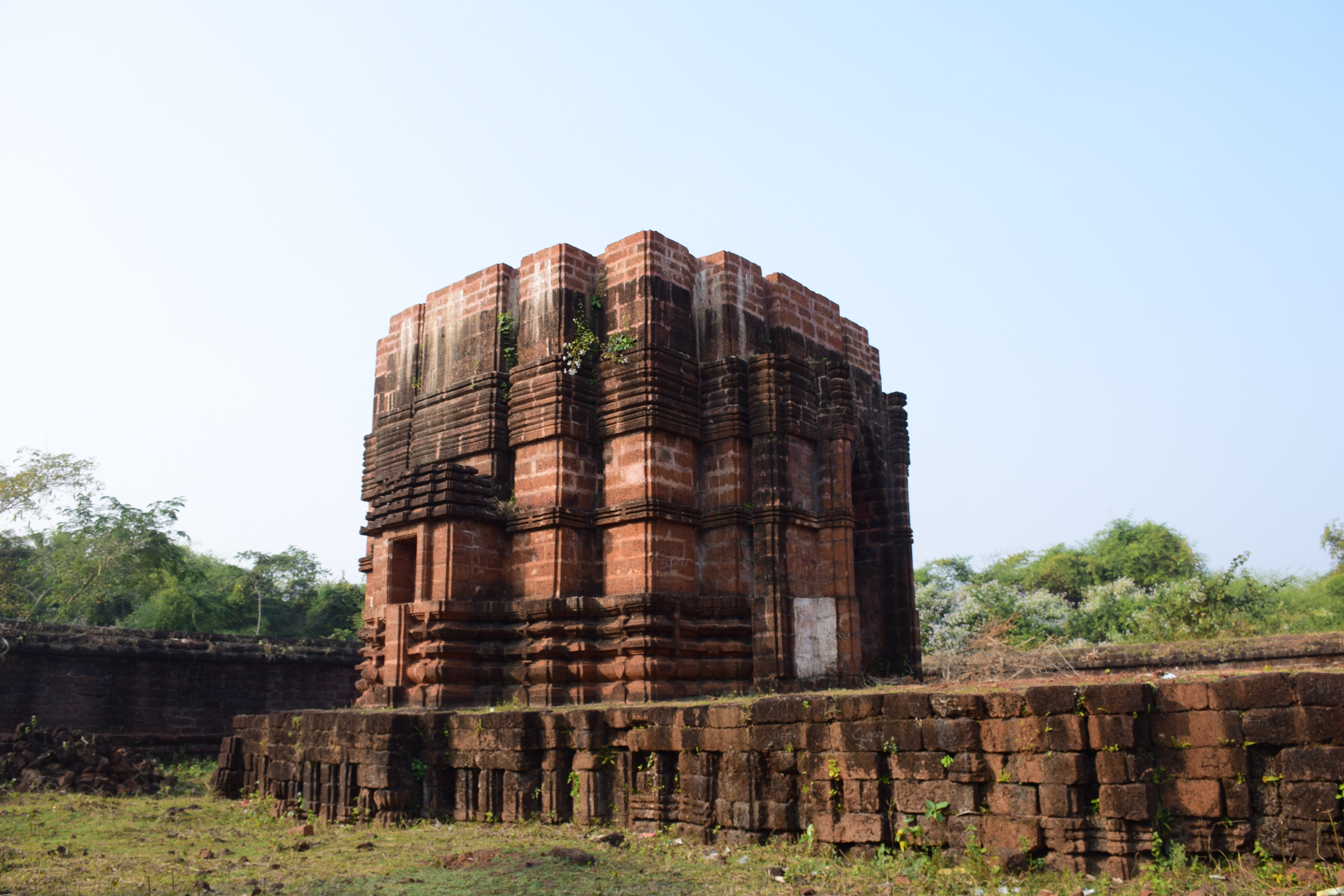
Raibania fort in Baleswar district of Odisha built under Gajapati langula Narasingha deva I, considered as the largest fort of eastern India

The Ganga military system was a very well organised and efficient institution. The emperor was the supreme commander of the army. The king was assisted by a commander-in-chief in military matters and lead wars. The Ganga army had several designations as per several Ganga plates and inscriptions such as:

- Maha Senapati
- Senapati
- Maha Pasayati
- Pasayati
- Dalapati
- Nayaka

The Ganga military system also had a royal navy at the time of Chodaganga. The Ganga empire had large number of fortified cities and flourishing ports.

== Culture ==
=== Religion ===
==== Shaivism ====
The Gangas were Shaivites and had constructed many temples dedicated to lord Shiva, the group of Shiva temples in Mukhalingam built by Kamarnaba deva, Chateswar Temple, Meghesvara Templke, Nagnath Temple built by Anangabhima Deva III.

==== Vaishnavism ====
Emperor Chodaganga deva embraced Srivaishnavism under the influence of Ramanuja and styles himself Paramavaishnava in his Sindurapura grant.

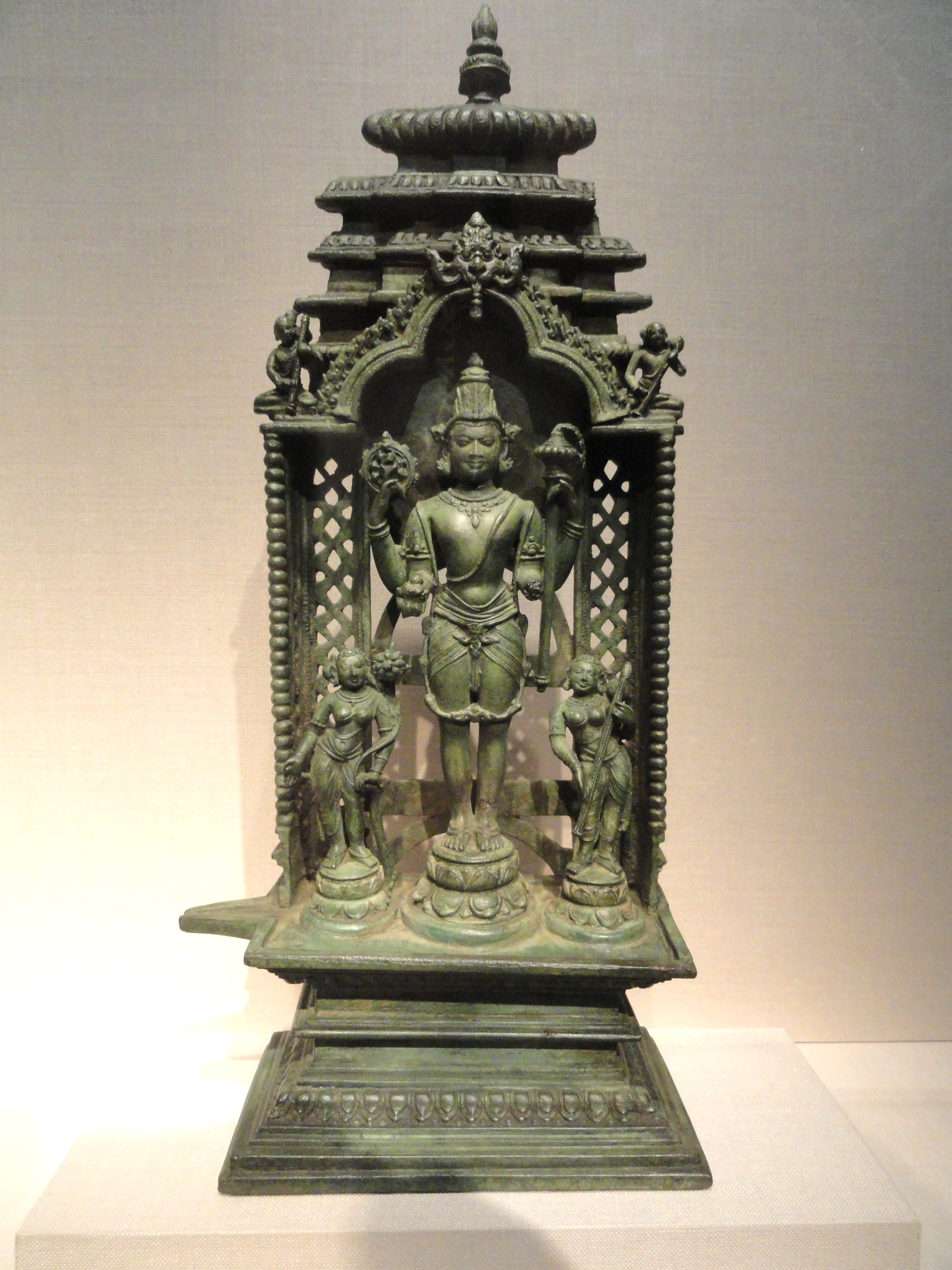
Vishnu with two consorts (Lakshmi and Saraswati), Ganga dynasty, 12th–13th century AD, Orissa, India

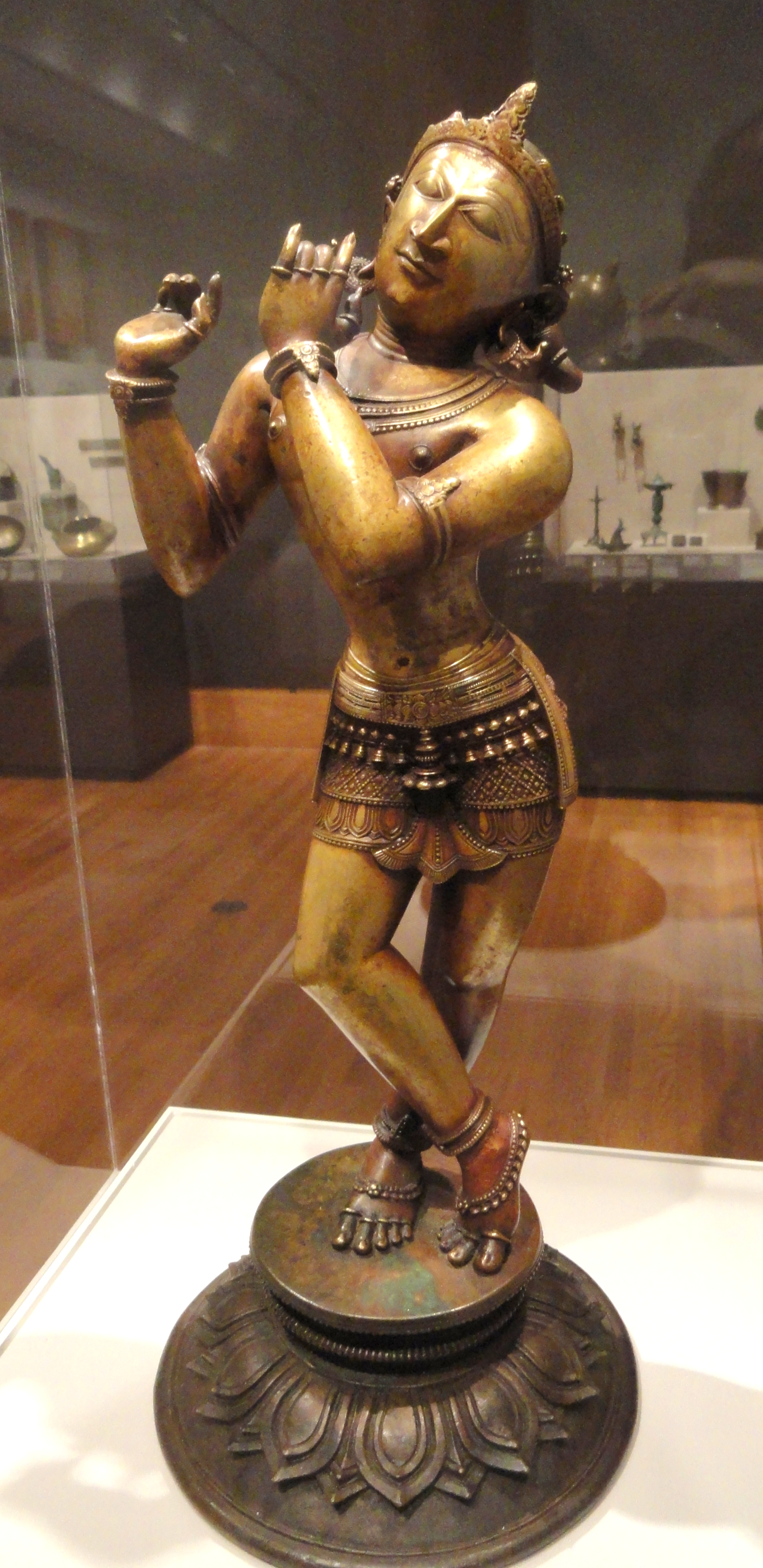
Krishna fluting, 13th–15th century AD, Eastern Ganga dynasty, Orissa, India

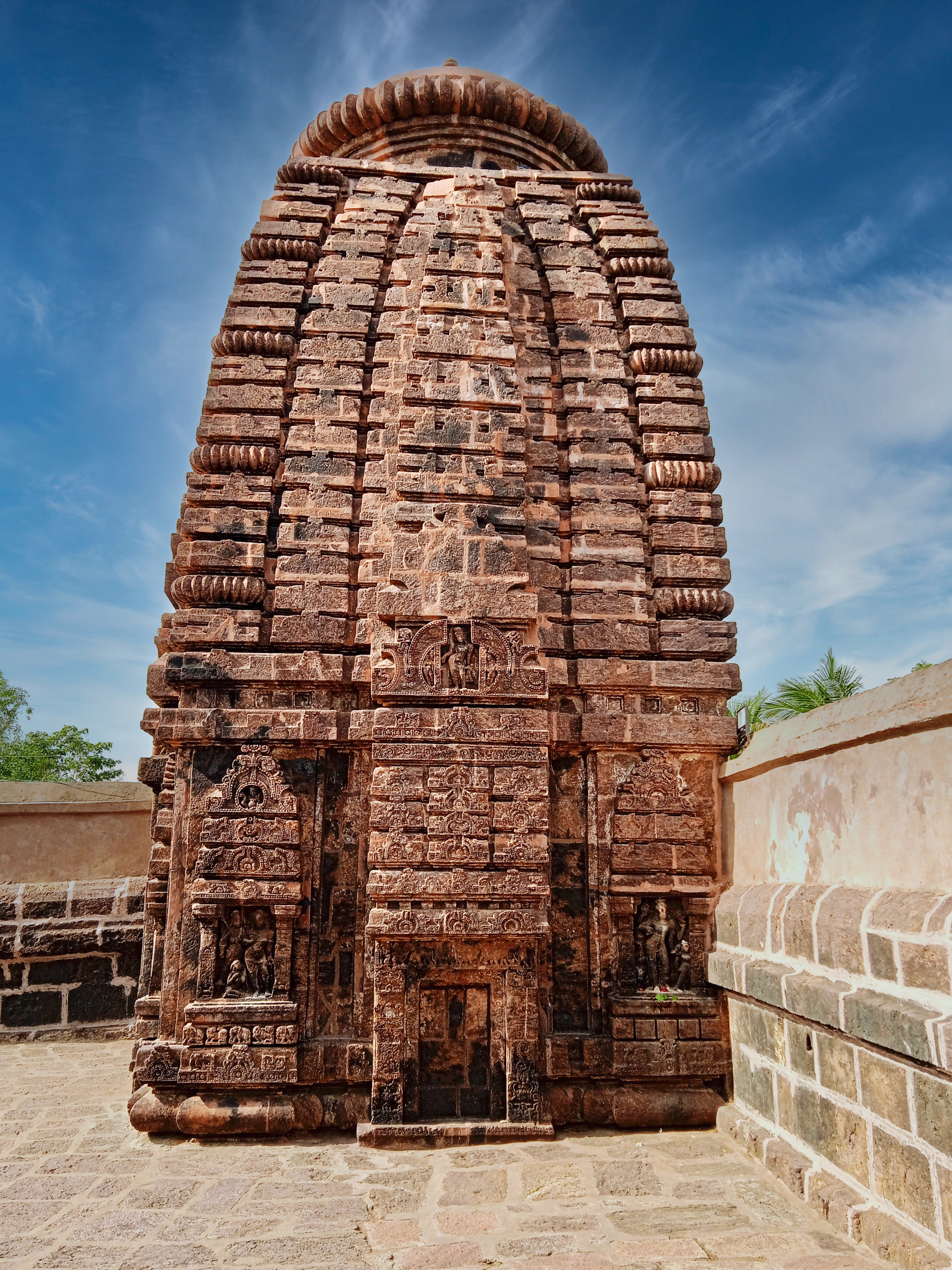
Mukhalingeswara group of temples, built by the Eastern Gangas, c. 700 CE

== List of rulers ==
Indravarman I is earliest known Independent king of the dynasty. He is known from the Jirjingi Copper Plate Grant.

The following is the list of Eastern Ganga rulers:

=== Kalinga Rulers (c. 498–1077 CE) ===
- Mittavarman (c. ??–498 CE)

(Eastern Ganga king, feudal under Vakataka rule)

- Indravarman I (c. 498–537; Real founder of dynasty)
- Samantavarman (c. 537–562)
- Hastivarman (c. 562–578)
- Indravarman II (c. 578–589)
- Danarnava (c. 589–652)
- Indravarman III (c. 652–682)
- Gunarnava (c. 682–730)
- Devendravarman I (c. 730–780)
- Anantavarman III (c. 780–812)
- Rajendravarman II (c. 812–840)
- Devendravarman V (c. 840–895)
- Gunamaharnava I (c. 895–910)
- Vajrahasta II (or Anangabhimadeva I; c. 910–939)
- Gundama I (c. 939–942)
- Kamarnava I (c. 942–977)
- Vinayaditya (c. 977–980)
- Vajrahasta IV (c. 980–1015)
- Kamarnava II (c. 1015, 6 months)
- Gundama II (c. 1015–1018)
- Madhukamarnava (c. 1018–1038)
- Vajrahasta V (3 May 1038 – 1070)
- Rajaraja Deva I (c. 1070–1077)

=== Trikalinga Rulers (c. 1077–1434 CE) ===
- Anantavarman Chodaganga (c. 1077–1150)
- Kamarnnava Deva (c. 1150–1156)
- Raghava Deva (c. 1156–1170)
- Rajaraja Deva II (c. 1170–1190)
- Anangabhima Deva II (c. 1190–1198)
- Rajraja Deva III (c. 1198–1211)
- Anangabhima Deva III (c. 1211–1238)
- Narasimha Deva I (1238–1264)
- Bhanu Deva I (1264–1278)
- Narasimha Deva II (1279–1306)
- Bhanu Deva II (1306–1328)
- Narasimha Deva III (1328–1352)
- Bhanu Deva III (1352–1378)
- Narasimha Deva IV (1378–1425)
- Bhanu Deva IV (1425–1434; Last ruler of dynasty)

== Regnal year system (Anka year) ==
The Anka year (Odia: ଅଙ୍କ Aṅka) system is a unique regnal year system instituted by the kings of the Eastern Ganga dynasty for dating their reigns. It has a number of unique features that calculates the regnal year different from that actual duration of the year elapsed during the reign. The system still survives today and is used in the Odia calendar (panjis) and the regnal year is marked by the titular reign of the current Gajapati Maharaja of the House of Gajapati at Puri.

== Coinage ==
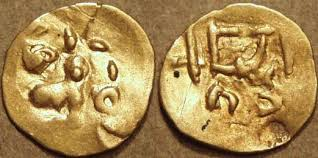
Eastern ganga fanam of bhanudeva II

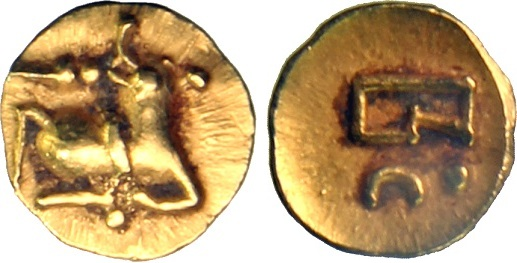
A Fanam (Coin) of Eastern Ganga Dynasty

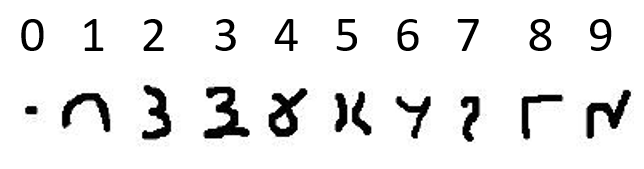
Eastern Ganga coinage numerals

The Eastern Ganga coinage consisted of gold fanams. The obverse typically depicts a couchant bull along with other symbols. The reverse features a symbol which represents the letter sa (for samvat, which means year) flanked by elephant goads or an elephant goad with a battle axe, along with a number below, which depicts the regnal year(anka year) of the reigning monarch. Some coins also carry the legend śrī rāma on the reverse above the letter sa.

An interesting aspect of the Eastern Ganga coin dates is that these coins may be the earliest Hindu coins using decimal numbers for dating. Earlier dated coins, such as those of the Western Satraps, the Guptas etc., used the old Brahmic numbering system with separate symbols representing each of the single digits, separate symbols representing two-digit multiples of ten, such as 20, 30, 40, and so on, and further separate symbols representing three-digit numbers such as 100, 200, etc. Thus a number like 123 was written as 100–20–3. But the Eastern Ganga coins were written using the symbols for the single digits, with the position of the number indicating the value such as tens or hundreds, thus effectively using the Zero-place holder system.

Gold fanams of Ganga rulers
Coin	Regnal name	Regnal year	detail
	Narsimhadeva II	27	The coin is characterised by Stylized humped bull seated right, symbols at right and above / Stylized Kannada sa flanked by elephant goad and battle axe.
	Bhanudeva II	22	The coin is characterized by the unusual sa on the reverse, with the curving line below.
	Narsimhadeva III	24	The coin are characterized by two properties: (i) there is a circle topped by two dots above in front of the bull, and (ii) the sa on the reverse has a rectangular shape but is open below.
	Bhanudeva III	26	The coins are characterized by two properties: (i) there is a circle topped by one dot above (rather than the two in the previous series) in front of the bull, and (ii) the sa on the reverse has a more elongated shape and is closed below
	Narsimhadeva IV	36	The coins are similar to the previous coins except for the addition of the words Sri Rama above the sa on the reverse
	Bhanudeva IV	20	Gold fanam of bhanudeva IV coin is characterised by a circle topped by one dot above in front of the bull, and the sa on the reverse has a more elongated shape and is closed below

== Legacy ==
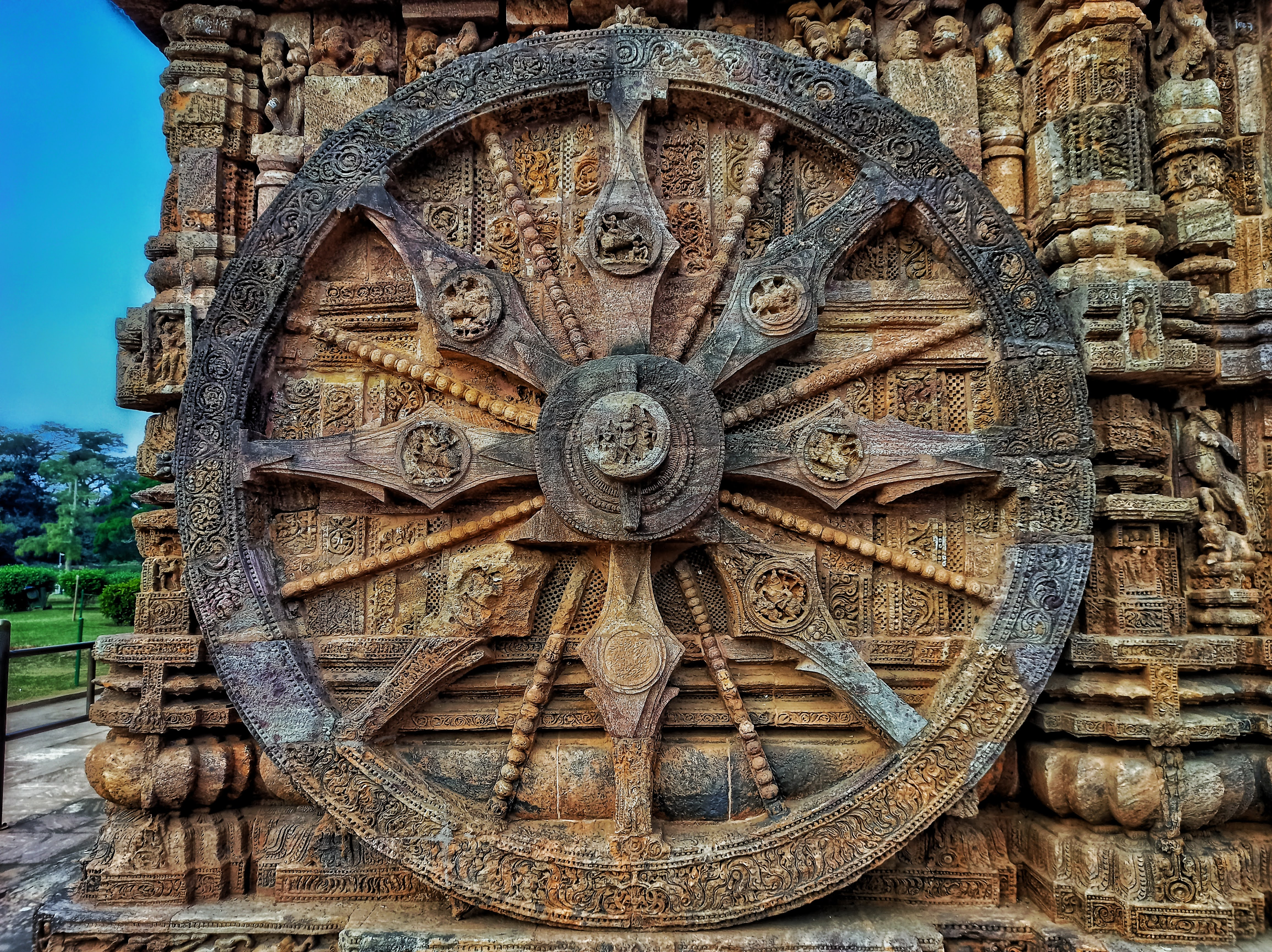
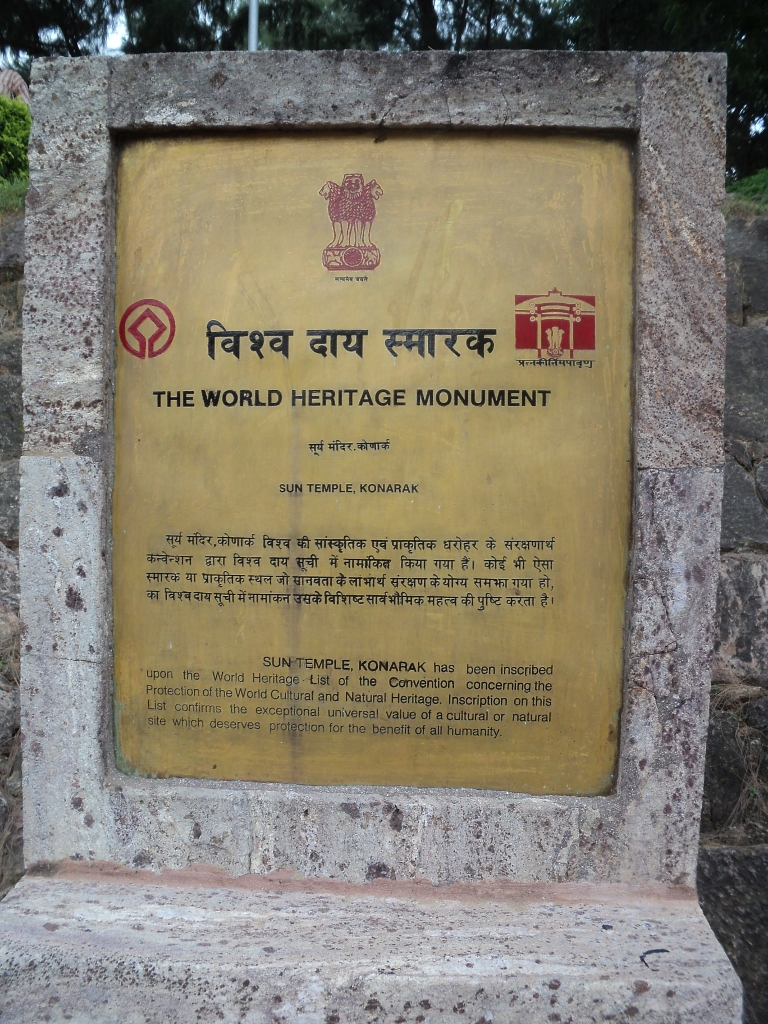
Konark chakra at the Konark Sun Temple, a World Heritage Site, and one of the finest examples of the architectural legacy of the Eastern Ganga dynasty.

By successfully defeating the invasion attempts of Muslim invaders, the Eastern Ganga Empire is attributed to have served as the conservatory of the Hindu religion, art and culture at a time when India's indigenous civilization was endangered through the large scale massacre of Hindus, plundering of cities, desecration and destruction of temples and forcible conversions of the Hindu populace. The Ganga Empire also harbored the fleeing culture and art from other parts of India.

The Eastern Gangas were great patrons of religion and the arts, and the temples of the Ganga period rank among the masterpieces of Kalinga and Hindu architecture.

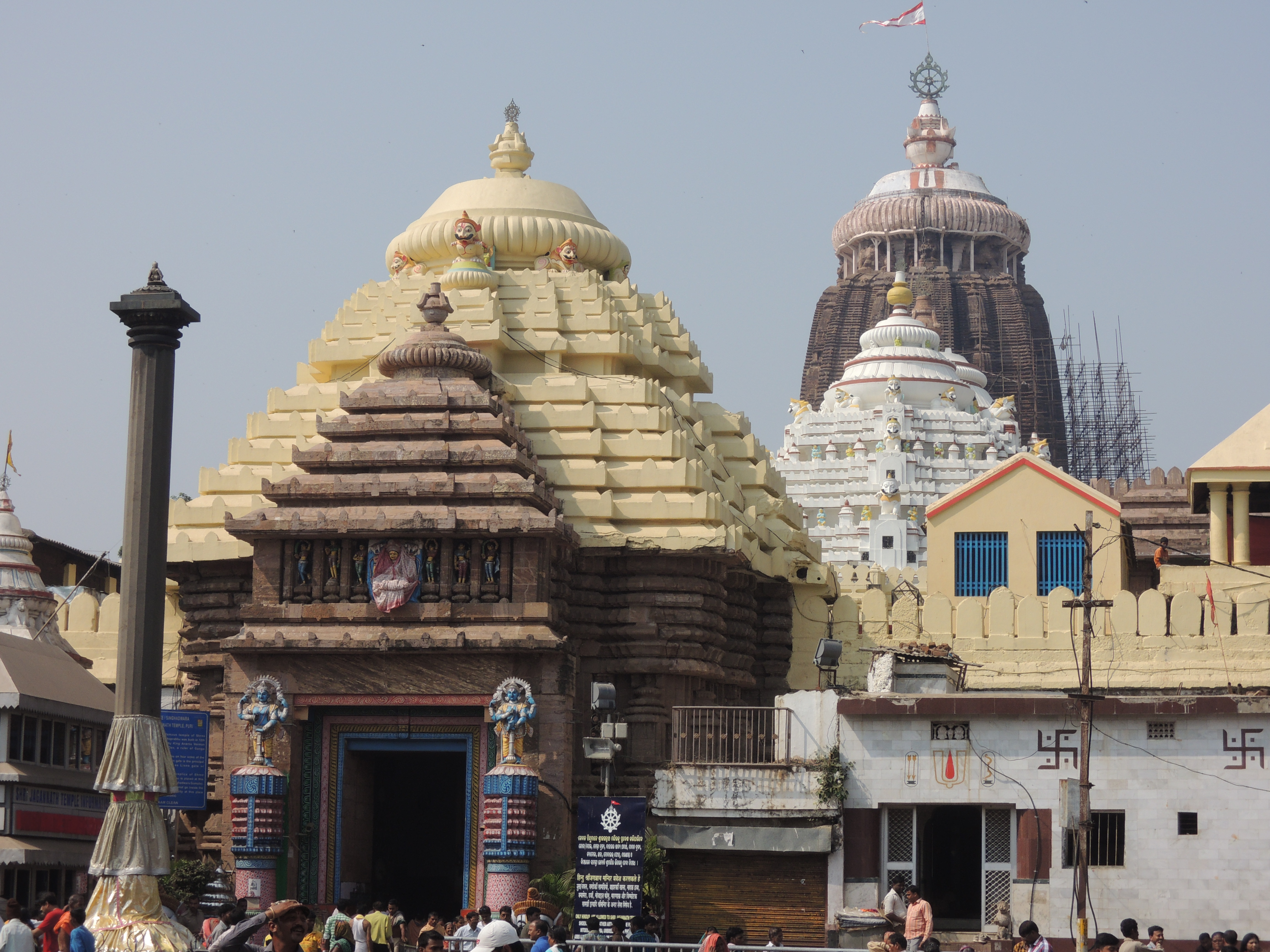
Jagannath Temple, Puri

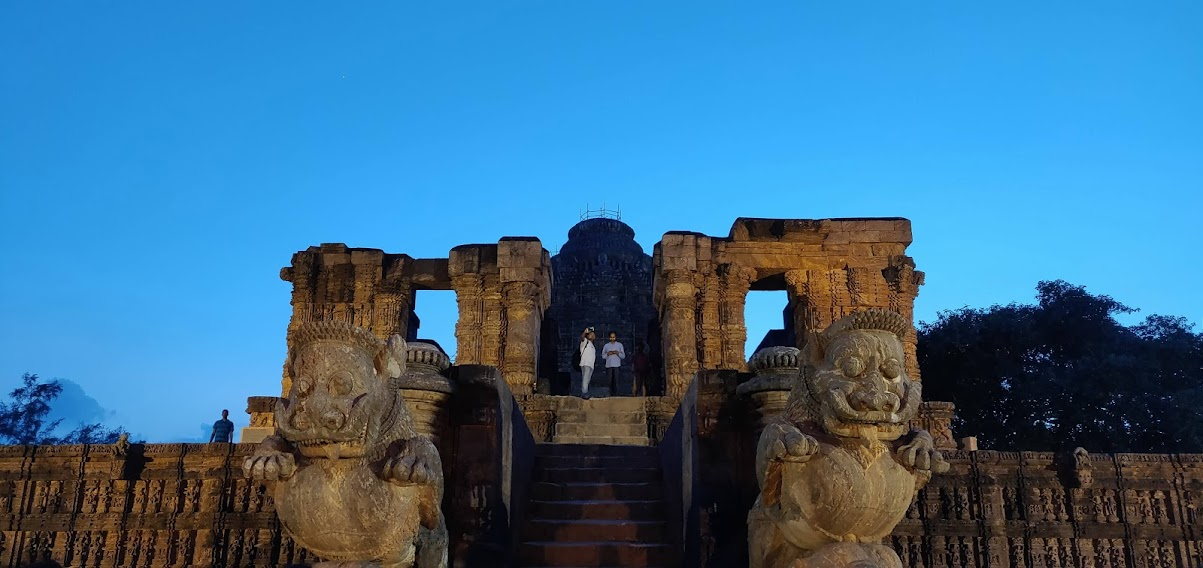
Konark Sun Temple, Konark

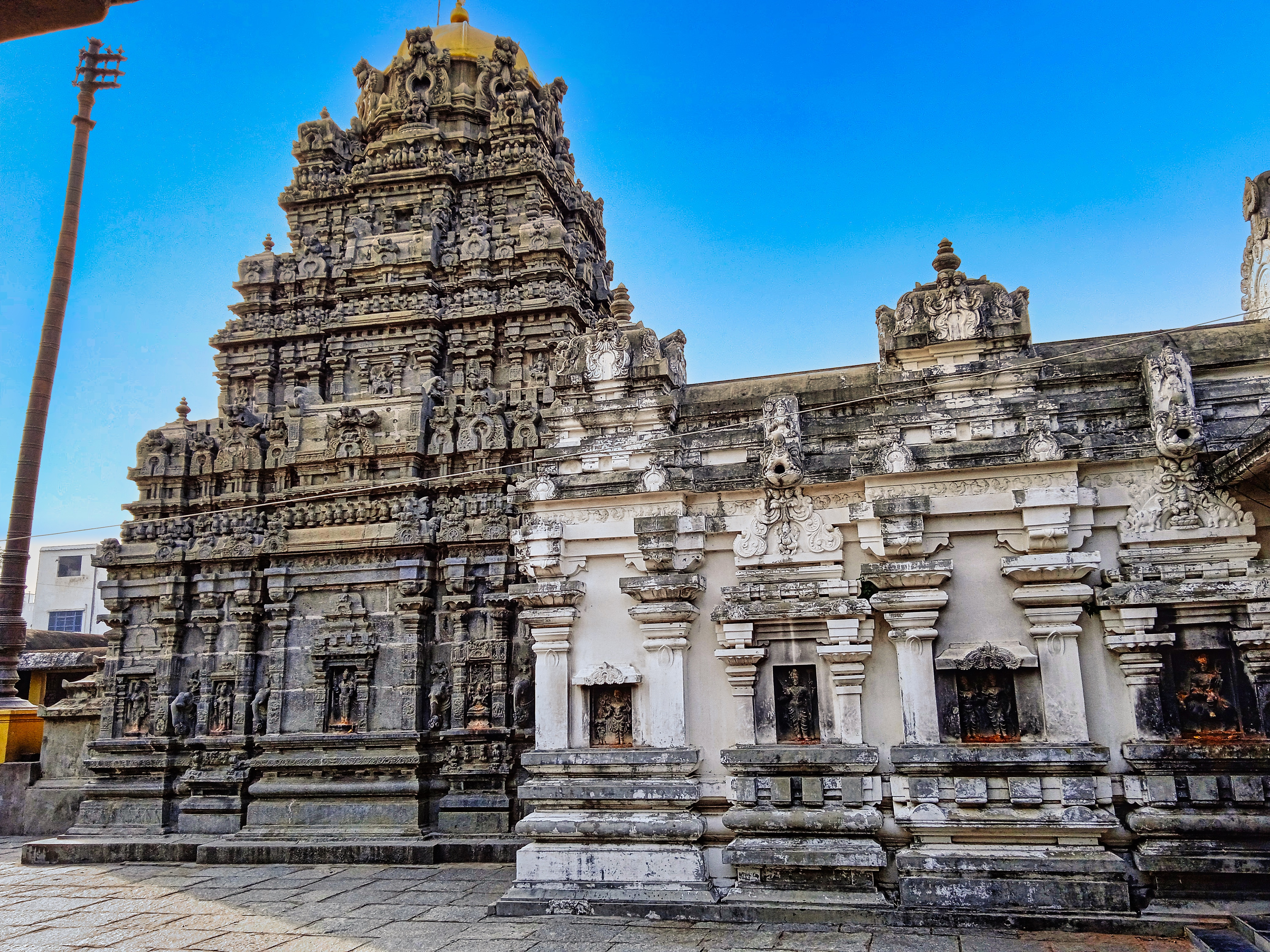
Kurmanathaswamy temple, Srikurmam

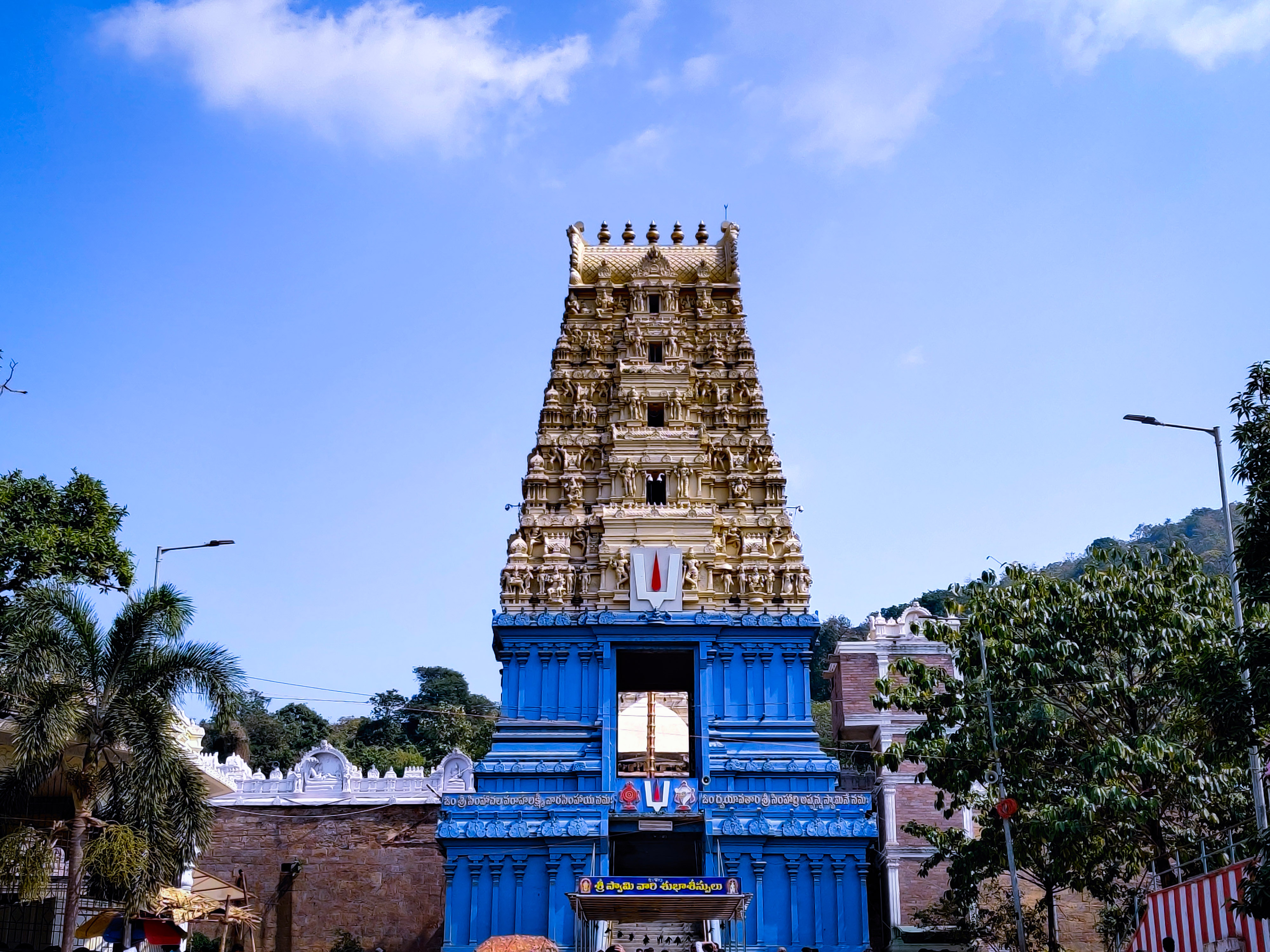
Varaha Lakshmi Narasimha temple, Simhachalam

== Descendants ==
- Early Gangas
  - Imperial Gangas
    - Paralakhemundi branch
      - Badakhemundi branch
        - Hindol branch
      - Sanakhemundi branch
    - Bamanda branch
  - Gangas of Svetaka Mandala
    - Chikiti branch

=== Paralakhemundi branch ===
A branch of the Eastern Ganga dynasty survived as the kings of the Paralakhemundi state, currently part of the Gajapati district, Odisha. It was established in 14th century when Narashingha Deba, a son of the Eastern Ganga monarch Bhanudeva II established the Khemudi kingdom. Scions of this line include,

- Jagannatha Gajapati Narayana Deo II (Reign: 1751 CE – 1771 CE) — who ascended to the throne at a time when Odisha was torn apart due conflicts between external powers like the Mughals, Marathas, French and British for control of the territory in 18th century.
- Krushna Chandra Gajapati (Reign as Maharaja of Paralakhemundi: 26 April 1913 – 25 May 1974) — who was a key personality and regarded as the architect of an Independent united Odisha State and went on to become the first Prime Minister of Orissa province formed in 1936. Prime Minister in office from 1 April 1937 to 19 July 1937 and 2nd time from 29 November 1941 to 29 June 1944. The present-day Gajapati District of Odisha which was earlier a part of the historic Ganjam district was named after him.
- Gopinath Gajapati (Titular Maharaja: 25 May 1974 – 10 January 2020) — served as the member of the 9th and 10th Lok Sabha of India and represented the Berhampur constituency of Odisha.
- Kalyani Gajapati (Titular Maharani since 10 January 2020) — current head of the dynasty.

=== Badakhemundi and Sanakhemundi branch ===
This line descends from the Paralakhemundi Ganga branch. In 16th century, the Raja of Parlakhemundi, Subarnalinga Bhanu Deba granted parts of the Khimedi areas to his son Ananga Kesari Ramachandra Deba, whose descendants in turn divided the zamindari into two branches- Badakhemundi and Sanakhemundi.

=== Hindol branch ===
The Hindol princely state was established in 1554 by two brothers, Chandradeva Jenamani and Udhavadeva Jenamani belonging to the family of the Badakhemundi Raja of Ganjam. The kingdom acceded to India and merged into the state of Odisha following independence in 1947.

=== Bamanda branch ===
The Bamra kingdom was established by Saraju Gangadeb who was the son of the local Eastern Ganga administrator of Patna region Hattahamir Deb, who was the son of Eastern Ganga ruler Bhanudeva II. Hattahamir Deb was overthrown in 1360 CE by Ramai Deva of the Chauhan dynasty who led the foundation of Patna state, while the tribal chieftains installed Saraju Gangadeb as the ruler of Bamanda region. This laid the foundation of the Bamanda branch of the Eastern Ganga dynasty. The kingdom acceded to India and merged into the state of Odisha following independence in 1947.

=== Chikiti branch ===
This branch were the descendants of the ancient branch of Svetaka mandala of the Early Gangas which became the Chikiti zamindari. Historians conclude that the rulers of Chikiti were from the line of Ganga ruler Hastivarman.

=== Jaffna Branch ===
The Jaffna Kingdom also known as the Kingdom of Aryachakravarti, was believed to have been established by Kalinga Magha from Kalinga who was believed to be a prince from the Chodaganga dynasty from Chandravanshi lineage.

== Gallery ==
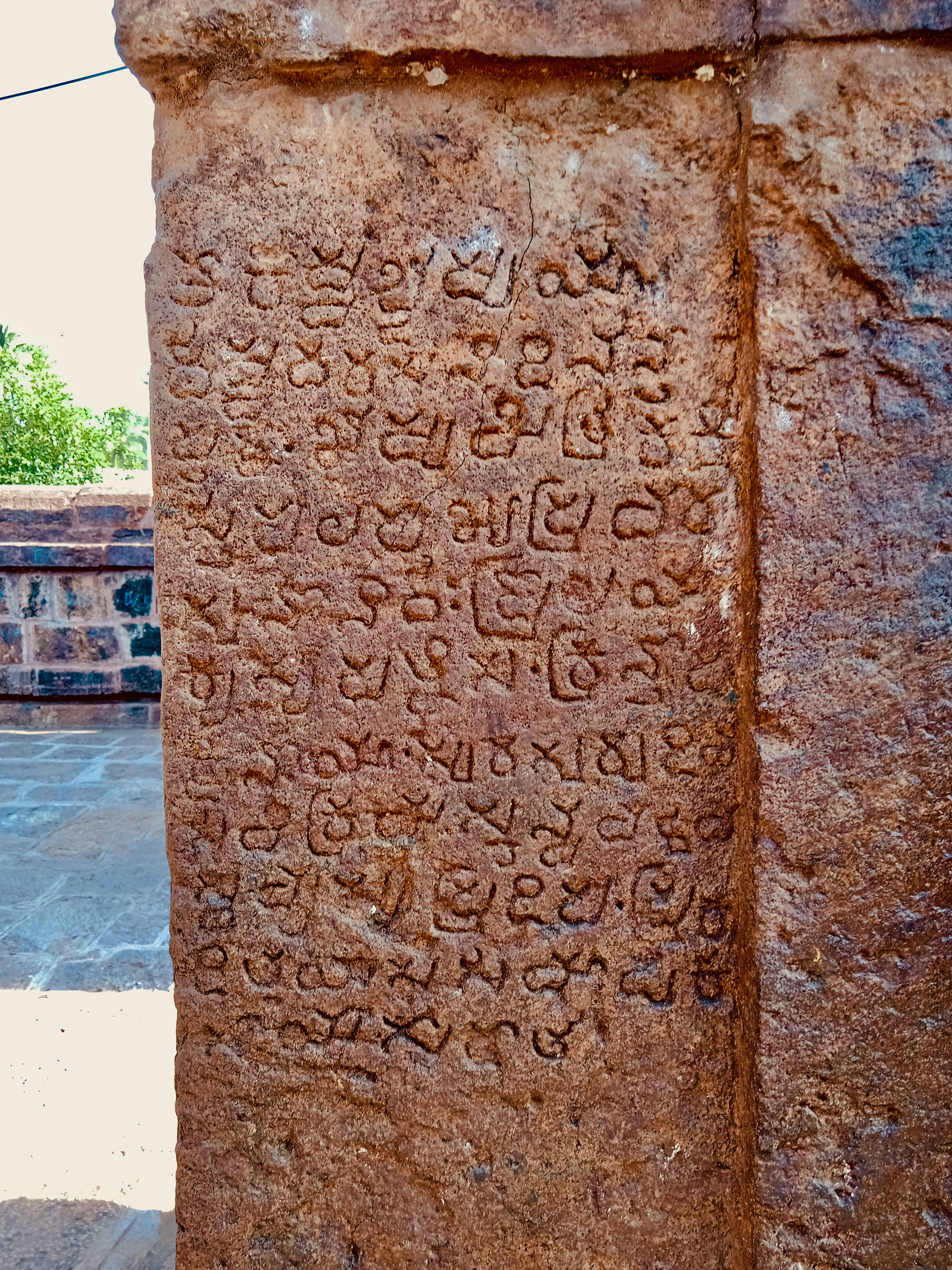
Old Telugu inscription of Ganga king 700 CE Mukhalingeswara Group of temples, Mukhalingam

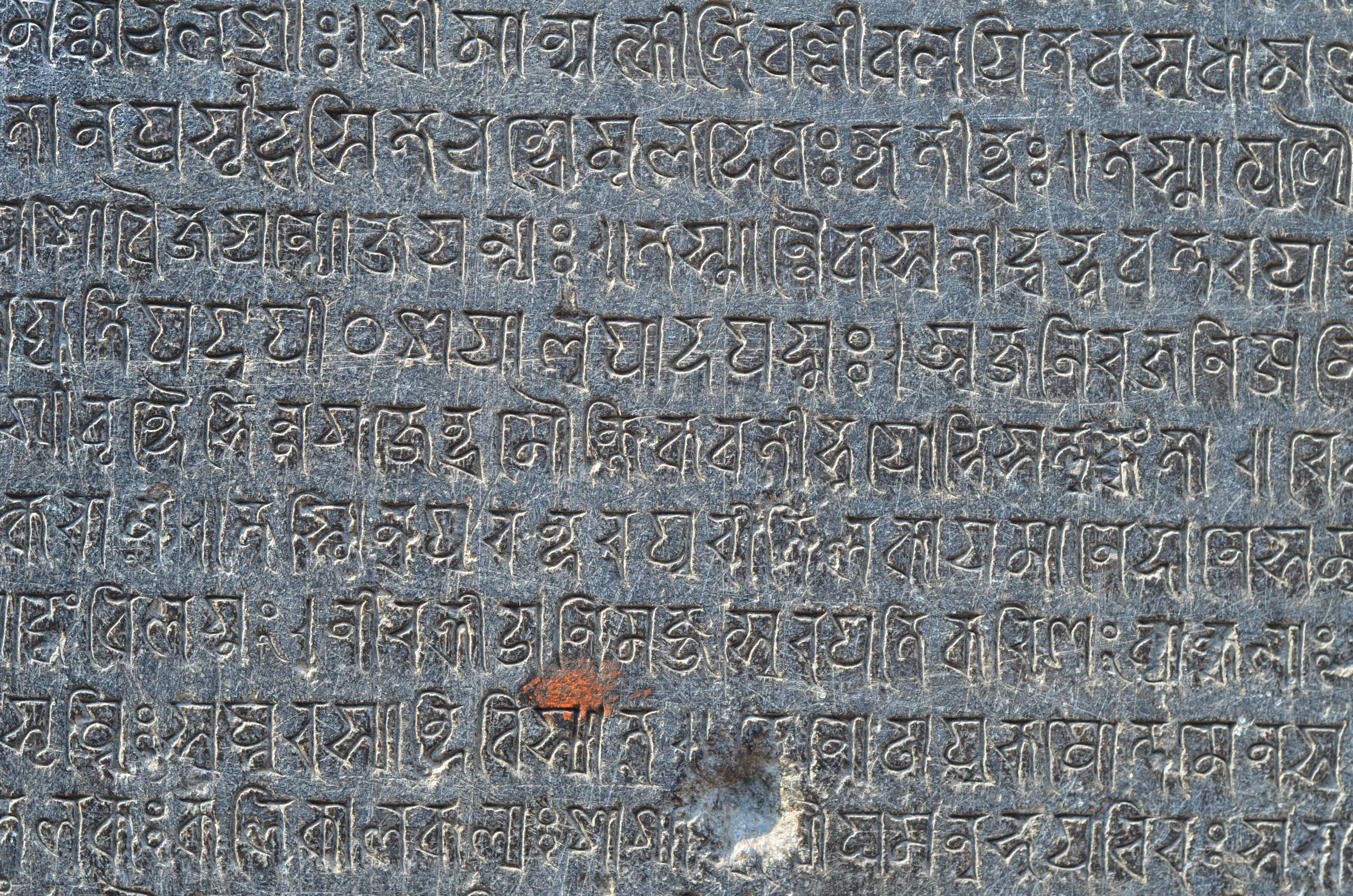
13th-century temple inscription, Ananta Vasudeva Temple, Bhubaneswar

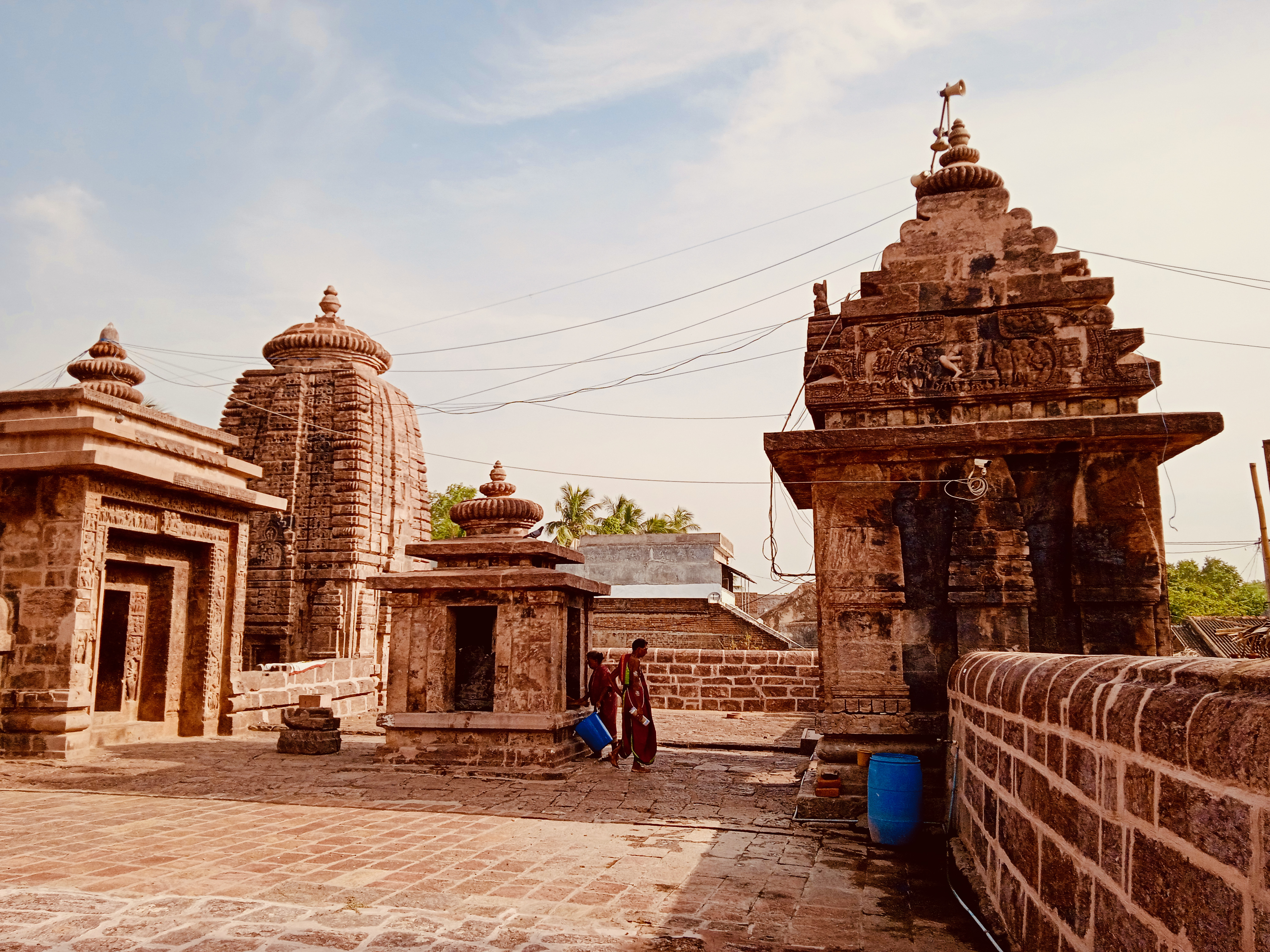
A temple in the Sri Mukhalingam temple complex at Mukhalingam

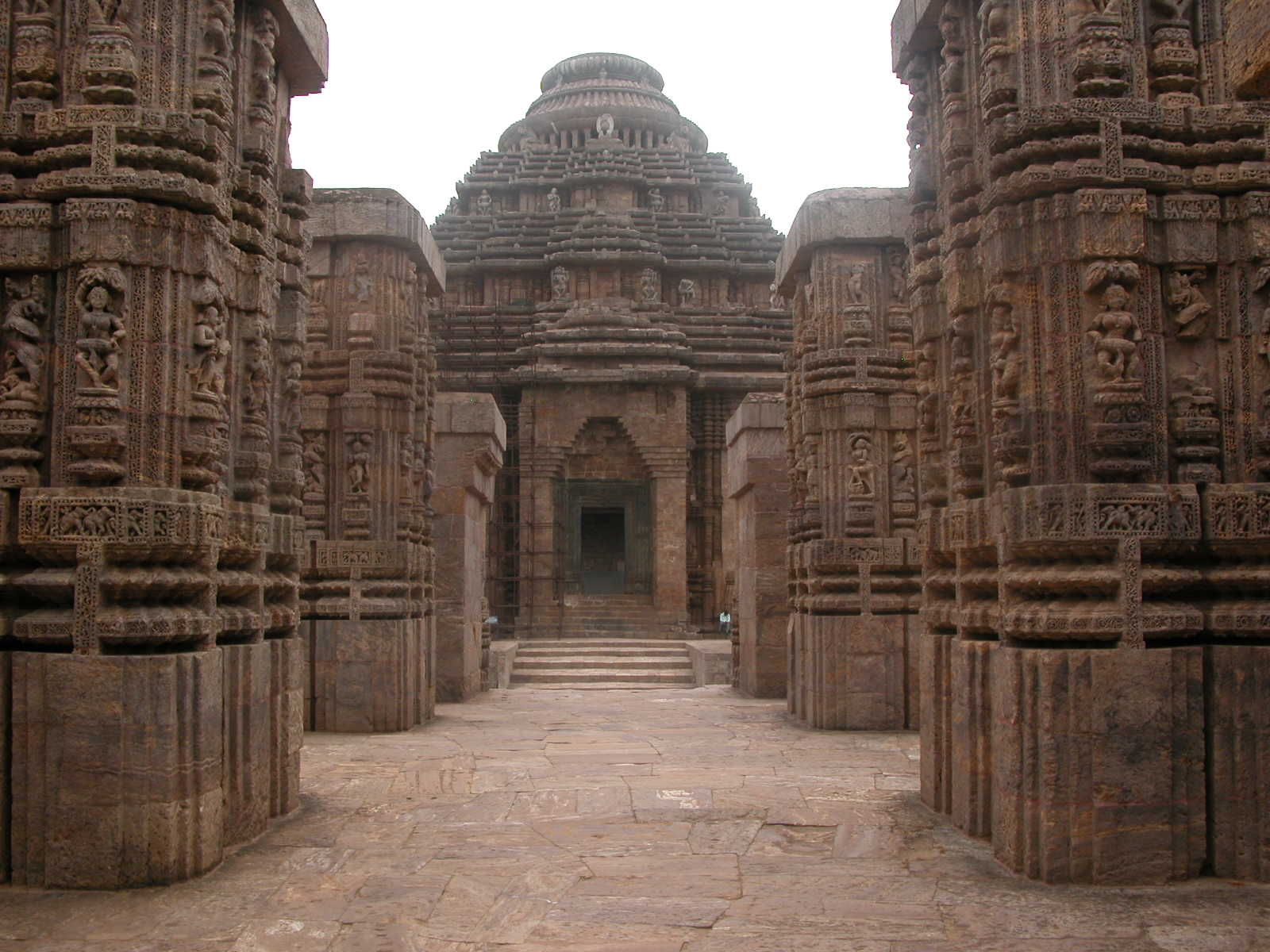
Konark Sun Temple, Konark, built by King Narasinghadeva I (13th century); now a World Heritage Site

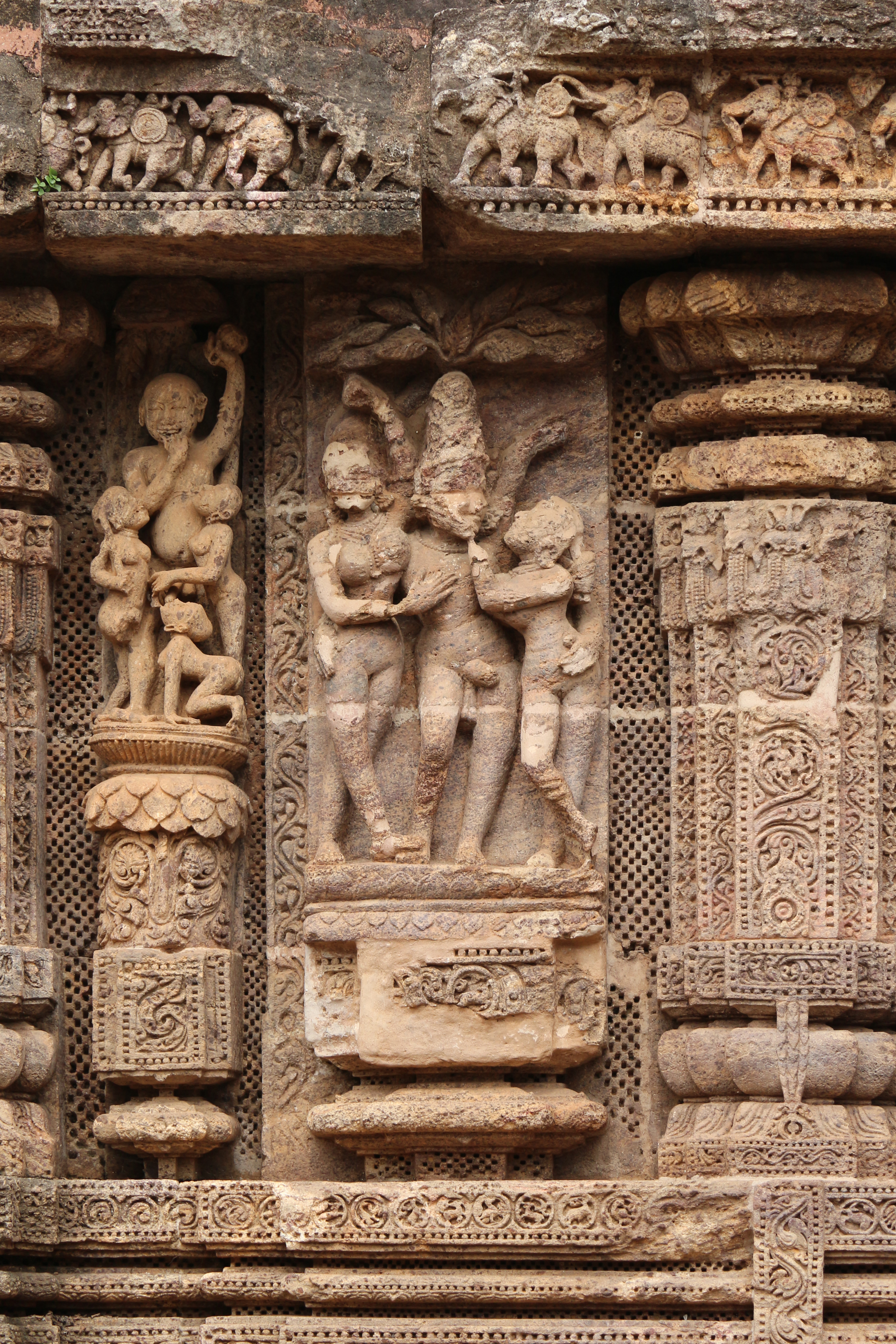
Reliefs at the Konark Sun Temple

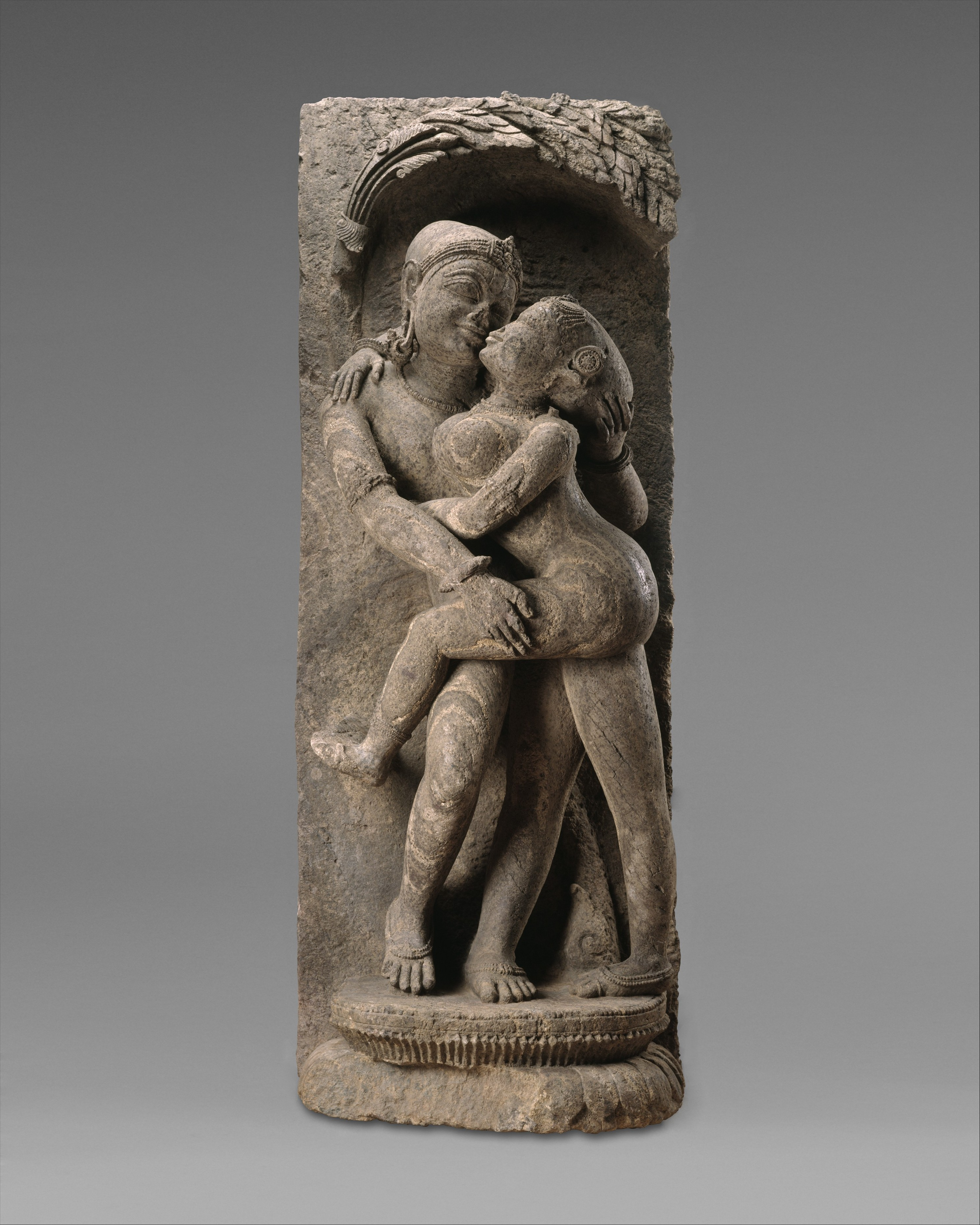
Loving Couple (Mithuna) 13th century, Eastern Ganga Dynasty, Orissa

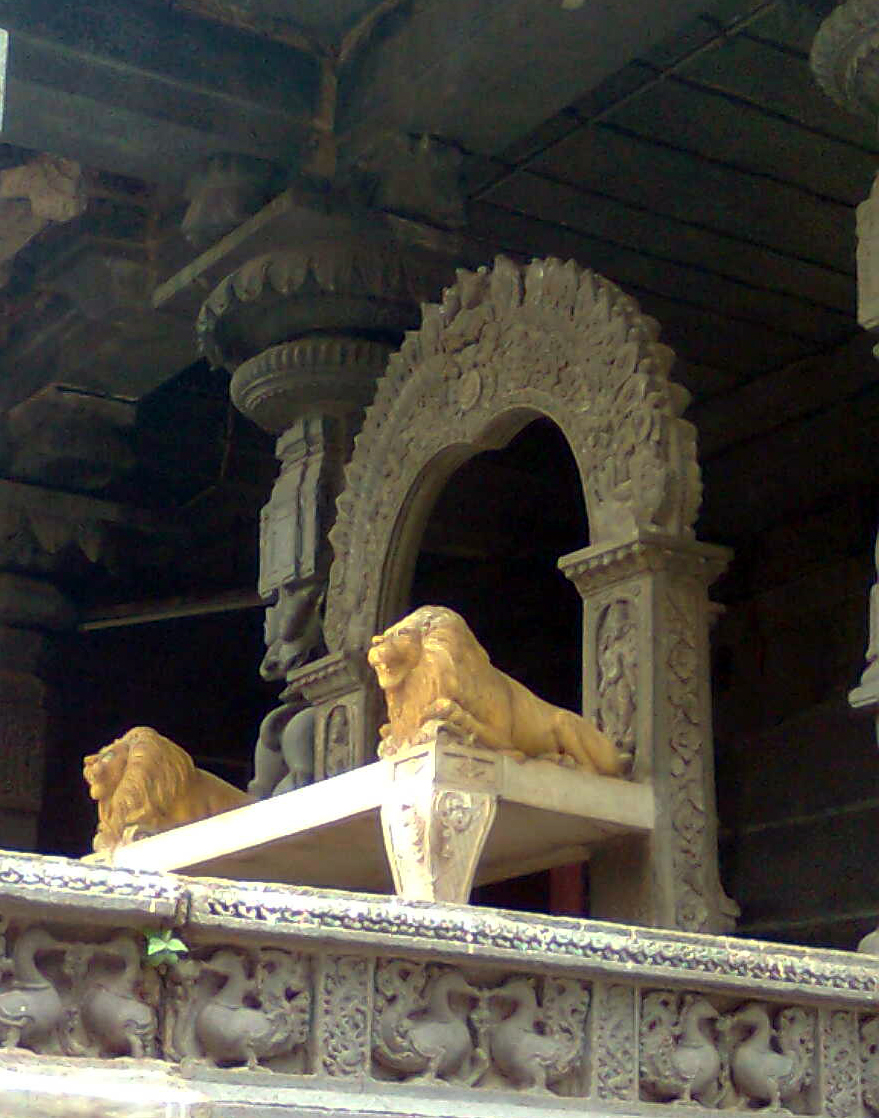
Stone-carved throne at Simhachalam Temple

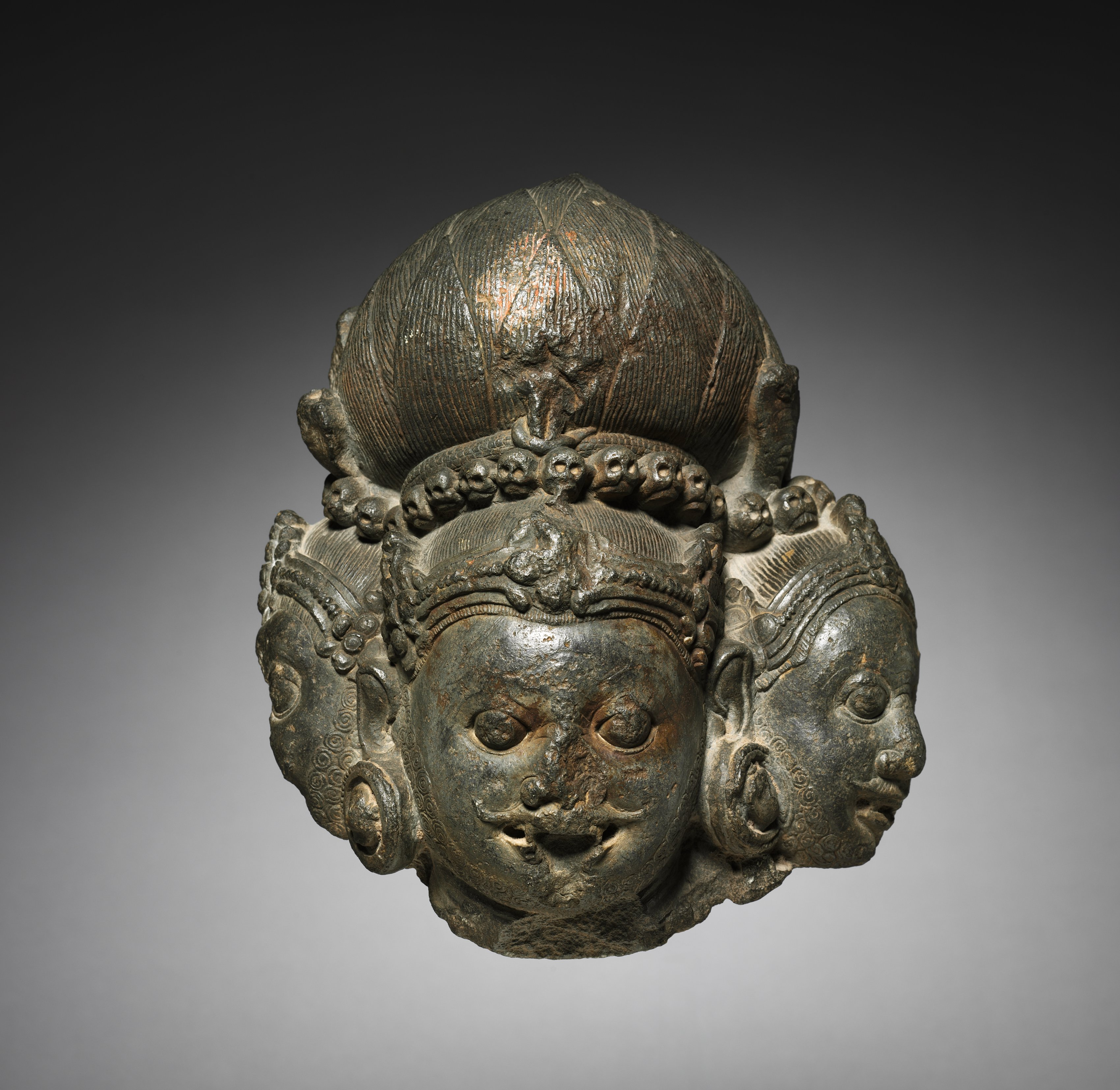
Trikala Bhairava from Odisha, Eastern Ganga Dynasty

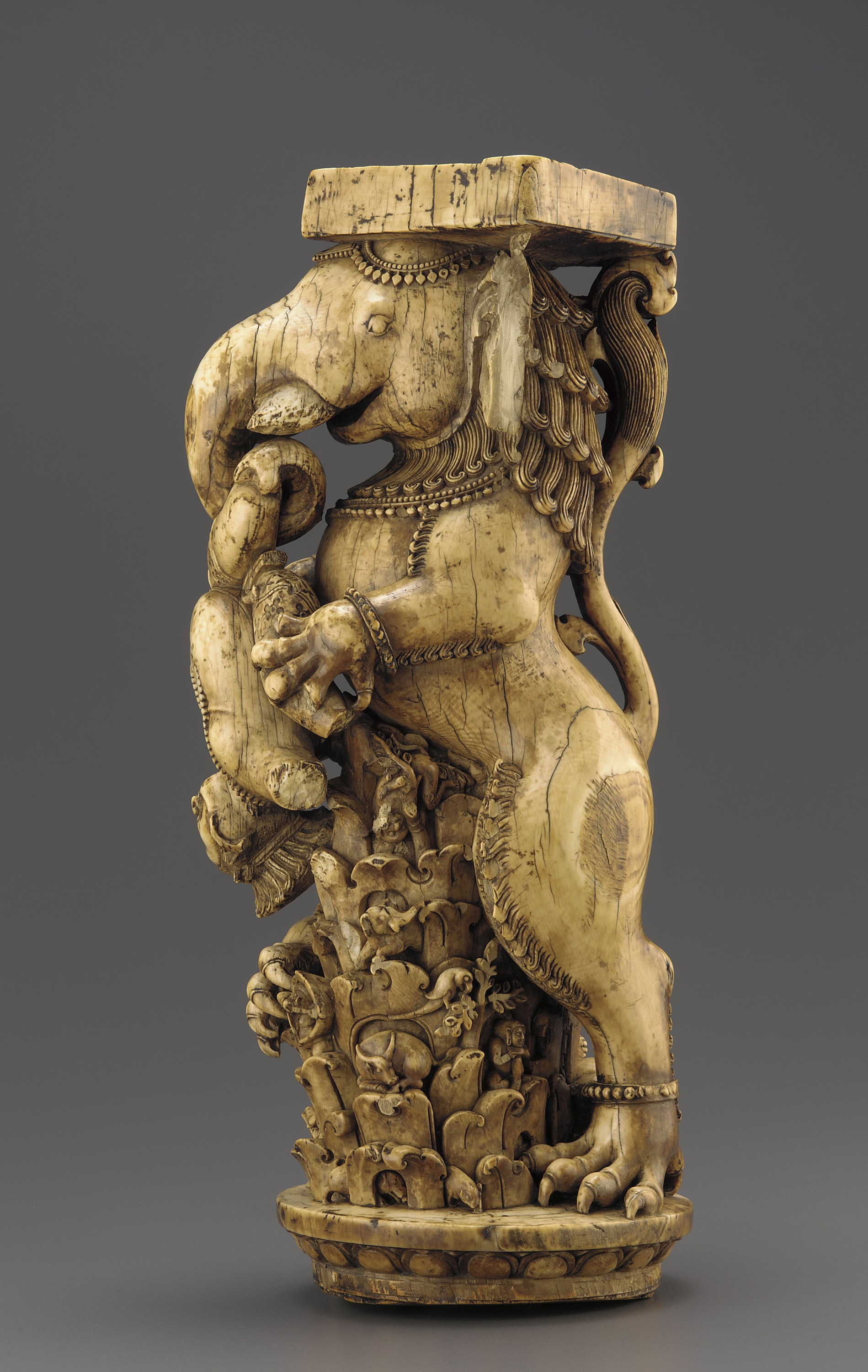
Ivory Throne Leg. Orissa, Eastern Ganga dynasty, 13th century

== See also ==
- List of rulers of Odisha
- Jagannath Temple, Puri
- Sevayat

== Notes ==
Timeline and cultural period	Indus plain (Punjab-Sapta Sindhu-Gujarat)	Gangetic Plain			Central India	Southern India
Timeline and cultural period	Indus plain (Punjab-Sapta Sindhu-Gujarat)	Upper Gangetic Plain (Ganga-Yamuna doab)	Middle Gangetic Plain	Lower Gangetic Plain	Central India	Southern India
IRON AGE
Culture	Late Vedic Period	Late Vedic Period; Painted Grey Ware culture	Late Vedic Period; Northern Black Polished Ware		Pre-history	
6th century BCE	Gandhara	Kuru-Panchala	Magadha		Adivasi (tribes)	Assaka
Culture	Persian-Greek influences	"Second Urbanisation"; Rise of Shramana movements Jainism - Buddhism - Ājīvika - Yoga			Pre-history	
5th century BCE	(Persian conquests)		Shaishunaga dynasty		Adivasi (tribes)	Assaka
4th century BCE	(Greek conquests)	Nanda empire				
HISTORICAL AGE
Culture	Spread of Buddhism				Pre-history	
3rd century BCE	Maurya Empire					Satavahana dynasty Sangam period (300 BCE – 200 CE); Early Cholas; Early Pandyan kingdom Cheras
Culture	Preclassical Hinduism (Note: Michaels (2004) p.39) - "Hindu Synthesis" (Note: Hiltebeitel (2002)) (ca. 200 BCE - 300 CE) (Note: Michaels (2004) p.39) (Note: Hiltebeitel (2002)); Epics - Puranas - Ramayana - Mahabharata - Bhagavad Gita - Brahma Sutras - Smarta Tradition; Mahayana Buddhism					
2nd century BCE	Indo-Greek Kingdom		Shunga Empire; Maha-Meghavahana Dynasty			Satavahana dynasty Sangam period (300 BCE – 200 CE); Early Cholas; Early Pandyan kingdom Cheras
1st century BCE	Indo-Greek Kingdom		Shunga Empire; Maha-Meghavahana Dynasty			Satavahana dynasty Sangam period (300 BCE – 200 CE); Early Cholas; Early Pandyan kingdom Cheras
1st century CE	Indo-Scythians; Indo-Parthians		Kuninda Kingdom			Satavahana dynasty Sangam period (300 BCE – 200 CE); Early Cholas; Early Pandyan kingdom Cheras
2nd century	Kushan Empire					Satavahana dynasty Sangam period (300 BCE – 200 CE); Early Cholas; Early Pandyan kingdom Cheras
3rd century	Kushano-Sasanian Kingdom; Western Satraps	Kushan Empire		Kamarupa kingdom	Adivasi (tribes)	Satavahana dynasty Sangam period (300 BCE – 200 CE); Early Cholas; Early Pandyan kingdom Cheras
Culture	"Golden Age of Hinduism"(ca. CE 320-650) (Note: Michaels (2004) p.40); Puranas - Kural; Co-existence of Hinduism and Buddhism					
4th century	Kidarites	Gupta Empire; Varman dynasty				Andhra Ikshvakus; Kalabhra dynasty Kadamba Dynasty; Western Ganga Dynasty
5th century	Hephthalite Empire	Alchon Huns				Vishnukundina; Kalabhra dynasty
6th century	Nezak Huns; Kabul Shahi; Maitraka				Adivasi (tribes)	Vishnukundina; Badami Chalukyas; Kalabhra dynasty
Culture	Late-Classical Hinduism (ca. CE 650-1100) (Note: Michaels (2004) p.41); Advaita Vedanta - Tantra; Decline of Buddhism in India					
7th century	Indo-Sassanids		Vakataka dynasty Empire of Harsha	Mlechchha dynasty	Adivasi (tribes)	Badami Chalukyas; Eastern Chalukyas; Pandyan kingdom (revival); Pallava
7th century	Karkota dynasty				Adivasi (tribes)	
8th century	Kabul Shahi	Pala Empire			Adivasi (tribes)	Eastern Chalukyas; Pandyan kingdom Kalachuri
9th century	Gurjara-Pratihara				Adivasi (tribes)	Rashtrakuta Empire; Eastern Chalukyas; Pandyan kingdom Medieval Cholas; Chera Perumals of Makkotai
10th century	Ghaznavids			Pala dynasty Kamboja-Pala dynasty	Adivasi (tribes)	Kalyani Chalukyas; Eastern Chalukyas; Medieval Cholas; Chera Perumals of Makkotai; Rashtrakuta
References and sources for table References Sources: Flood, Gavin D. (1996), An Introduction to Hinduism, Cambridge University Press; Hiltebeitel, Alf (2002), Hinduism. In: Joseph Kitagawa, "The Religious Traditions of Asia: Religion, History, and Culture", Routledge; Michaels, Axel (2004), Hinduism. Past and present, Princeton, New Jersey: Princeton University Press
