= Jagannatha Gajapati Narayana Deo II =

King of Paralakhemundi estate

- ଶ୍ରୀ ଜଗନ୍ନାଥ ଗଜପତି ନାରାୟଣ ଦେବ
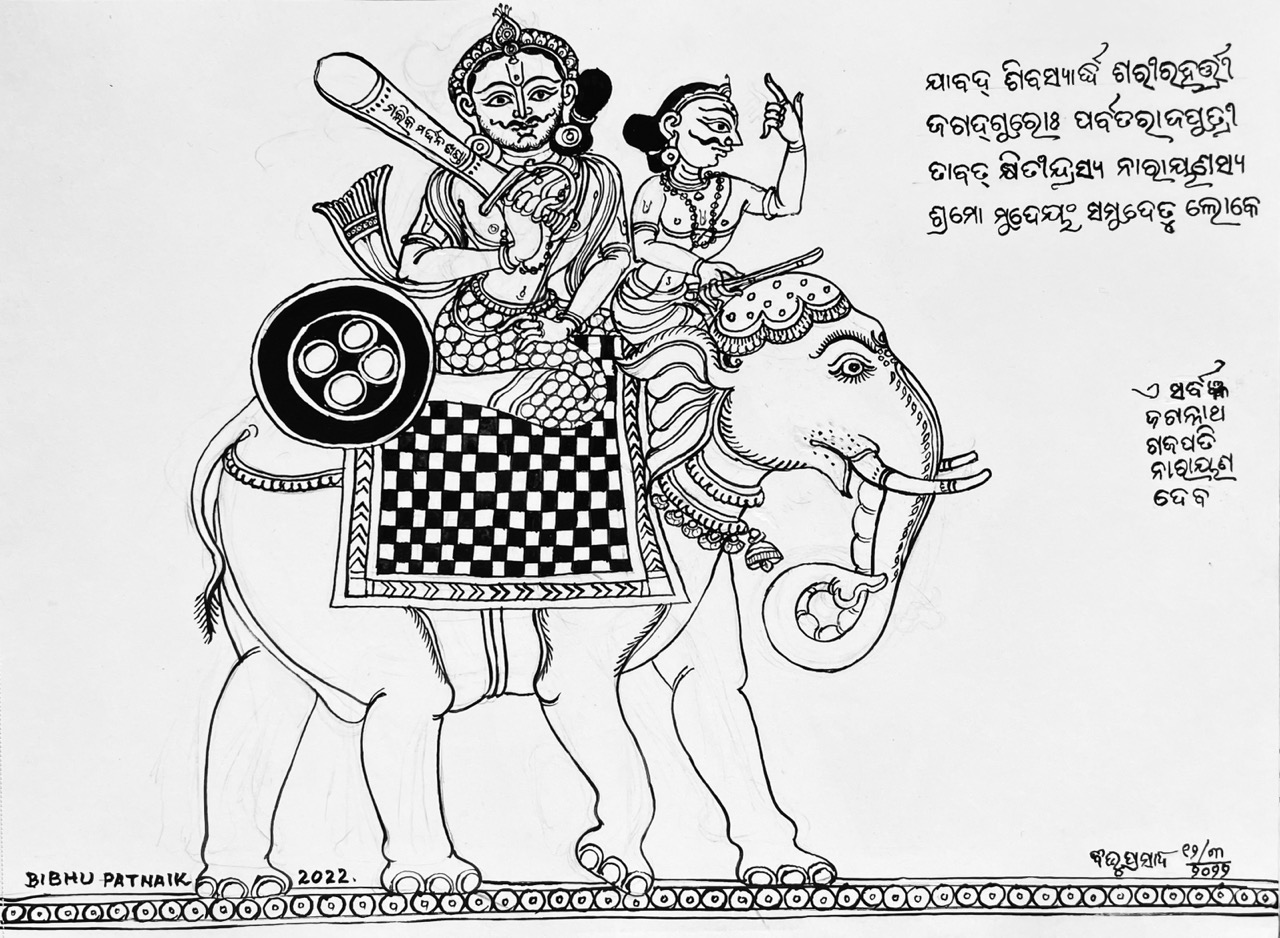
- Portrait of Sarbajna Jagannātha Gajapati Nārāyan Deba l.
- Reign: 1736 CE – 1771 CE
- Predecessor: Prataprudra Gajapati Narayan Deo I
- Successor: Goura Chandra Gajapati Narayan Deo I
- House: Eastern Ganga dynasty (Paralakhemundi branch)
- Religion: Hinduism

Jagannatha Gajapati Narayana Deo II (Odia: ଦ୍ୱିତୀୟ ଜଗନ୍ନାଥ ଗଜପତି ନାରାୟଣ ଦେବ) was the Odia monarch of the Paralakhemundi Estate in the southern part of today's Odisha and northern Andhra Pradesh. He was from the Eastern Ganga dynasty of the Khemundi Ganga Branch from the year 1736 CE to 1771 CE. He had ascended to the throne at the age of eighteen and at a time when Odisha was torn apart due conflicts between external powers like the Mughals, Marathas, French and British for control of the territory. He invaded khurdha Bhoi dynasty king Birakishore Deva and Vizianagaram estate King Pusapati Vijayarama Raju II and defeated the both kings. He made the last great attempts on his own to revive the lost glory of Odisha and its unique Hindu culture that revolved around the tradition of Jagannath worship. He had defied the authority of the Nizam of Hyderabad and maintained his own sovereignty. He was one of the first rulers who indulged in conflicts with the new European colonists in the eastern part of India. He was also effort bound till the end of his life in framing strategic diplomatic plans to free the ancient land of Odisha from external aggressors and revival of its lost Eastern Ganga Dynasty-Gajapati glory from the past.

== Political conditions of Paralakhemundi ==
Northern Circars handed over to the French after the Treaty of Hyderabad that included the Paralakhemundi Estate and Ganjam in its Northern Part.

After the death of the last Suryavanshi emperor of Odisha Prataparudra Deva in 1540 A.D, most of the Gajapati Empire reduced to a small tiny strip of land in today's coastal Odisha. The Golconda Qutb Shahi ruler – Quli Qutb Shah had engaged militarily with the last great Gajapati ruler and had managed to acquire southern parts of the Gajapati Empire. By the year 1630 A.D, the whole of Paralakhemundi fell into the hands of the Qutb Shahi rulers and then passed on to Nizam-Ul- Mulk’s control who himself was ruling in southern India as the Subedar or vassal of Mughals in the year 1713 A.D. In the year 1753 A.D, the Paralakhemundi estate passed on to the French along with three other adjoining estates in the Northern Circars when the Nizam gave it to the French under a treaty acknowledging their services rendered to him. The independent ruler of Paralakhemundi, Gajapati Jagannath Narayan Deo II defied the Treaty of Hyderabad and the French authority over his territory as his family had even denied the rule of the Nizam over their estate earlier and functioned as independent rulers.

=== Administration and the military ===
The rulers of Paralakhemundi had an efficient way of delivering administration and collecting taxes from their subjects. The area of the heartland estate was 639 square kilometers. The whole estate and the total territory under the control of the rulers were, divided in eleven divisions that were, ruled by the eleven representative Bisoyis of the king. The administrative territory included seven divisions of hilly and mountainous terrain while the rest four comprised the plain areas. The Bisoyis were also in the command of Paika militia units with the help of which they defended their divisions from any external threats. There were further seventeen subdivisions and were controlled by the small militia leaders called the Doras who were selected by the King personally. The Doras collected taxes from the Gumang chiefs of the Savara tribal communities residing in different villages. After Narayana Deo II ascended the throne in the year 1736 CE, he had openly defied any control by the Nizam and joined hands with other local rulers and landlords of Ganjam and Srikakulam taluk opposing the control by Golconda rulers. As his predecessors, he defied paying revenue taxes to the Nizams. The Nizam in return was also militarily incapable of controlling the further rebellious northern divisions of the Northern Circars.

== Military engagements ==
Jagannatha Narayana Deo II envisioned to pull the ancient land of Odisha and its great Hindu culture out of the greedy clutches of external powers. He sent secret messages to different local rulers for uniting against the enemies, freeing Odisha and reviving the ancient glory of Odisha as a military power in the subcontinent. However, he failed in his effort to persuade his fellow ruling kings to unite for this cause as most of them were either the vassals of Marathas or powerless to challenge the presence of great military powers contesting with each other for complete authority. Enraged by the ineffectiveness of the ruler of Khurda and head administrator of the Jagannath temple at Puri, Virakishore Deva he invaded his kingdom in 1760 A.D.

=== First battles of Jelmur with Sitaram Raju, the French regent ===
Prior to this invasion of Khurda by the French, who were in control of Ganjam district, had appointed the Telugu king of Vizianagaram Sitaram Raju as their regent of their Odia territories. As per the treaty of Hyderabad, Paralakhemundi was submitted to the French by the Nizam in 1753 A.D but Narayan Deo II had defied them like the Nizam. To gain control of the estate, Sitaram Raju continuously invaded Paralakhemundi on behalf of the French. According to the records, the forces of Paralakhemundi and Sitaram Raju had clashed at least twice near Jelmur situated thirty kilometers from Paralakhemundi town, resulting in the defeat of the forces of the French regent but also losing some parts of the estate in the meanwhile.

=== Invasion of Khurda and Battles of Chatragarh Fort ===
In the year 1760 A.D, Narayan Deva II invaded the coastal districts of Odisha to defeat the incompetent Bhoi dynasty vassal ruler of the Marathas Virakishore Deva, take control of the Jagannath temple and push the Marathas out of Barabati Fort. He first attacked the fort of Chatragarh in the district of Puri that was controlled by the Khurda forces and laid a seize to it. The king of Khurda was defeated and escaped to Cuttack that was controlled by the Marathas seeking their intervention.

The Marathas agreed to support their vassal Bhoi king at the condition of more revenue from the Khurda territory that included Puri and Nayagarh districts of today. The combined army of the Marathas and the Khurda king attacked the Paralakhemundi forces at the fort of Chatragarh. Unable to hold a much larger and well supplied Maratha army, Narayana Deo II decided to retreat to his estate. The Khurda king, Virkishore Deva however was unable to pay the promised additional revenues for this support provided by the Marathas and had to surrender his authority over Limbai, Rehang and Puri to them.

=== Second Battle of Jelmur with Sitaram Raju ===
In the year 1761 A.D during the absence of Narayana Deo II from his estate for his expedition on Khurda, the king of Vizianagaram Sitaram Raju had invaded Paralakhemundi with his brother Vijayaram Raju. A battle ensued at the fort of Jelmur where Sitaram Raju again lost to the Paralakhemundi forces who had returned fresh from battle with Khurda.

== Second Treaty of Hyderabad and beginning of Paralakhemundi affairs ==
In year 1759 A.D the French retreated from the Northern Circars as the British forces were threatening Madras. The French governor of Pondicherry, Monsieur Lally had summoned the French troops to fight against the British attack at Madras. Taking the advantage of the French retreat, the people of Paralakhemundi revolted against their regents like Sitaram Raju. After the French were pursued out of Hyderabad, on twelfth of November 1766 the Nizam of Hyderabad Nizam Ali Khan concluded another treaty with the British East India Company in which he surrendered the northern territories to them. The East India Company sent an officer by the name Mr. Cotsford to assess the situation of these territories the next year. On his tour to the regions of Visakhapatnam and Ganjam, Cotsford not only reported the excesses and atrocities carried out by the former French regent Sitaram Raju but also reported about Paralakhemundi as follows:

When the English entered Ganjam to take possession of Northern Circar, Narayan Deo, the Zamindar of Paralakhemundi (the largest and the most important Zamindar of Ganjam) had possessed himself to the country and refused to submit to the authority of the English (T.J.Maltby, Ganjam Manual Page 89, Para 2, 191 edition)

The defiance and series of uprisings by Narayana Deo II is stated as the first phase of Paralakhemundi Affairs and was considered as important matter as the connection between Madras and Calcutta was threatened by the events taking place in Paralakhemundi.

=== Third Battle of Jelmur with the British ===
Based on the report presented by Mr. Cotsford, the British dispatched a force under the leadership of Colonel Peach to suppress the defiant king of Paralakhemundi. On the fourth of April 1768 A.D, the forces of Narayana Deo II and the British clashed at Jelmur. Unable to contain the superior British forces, Narayana Deo II lost the battle and hid himself in the Malliah hilly terrains of his estate. After the East India Company came victorious in the region they appointed Ramyogi Patra as the Diwan or the administrator of the estate to collect revenues. The Bisoyis, Doras, Savara tribals and other common people continued to stay loyal and only paid the taxes declaring Narayana Deo II as the legal ruler. The British captured Pratapgiri, Alladigam and Siddheswaram forts on seventeenth of April 1768 A.D. The British later sent Captain Bendinell in 1771 A.D with a contingent to subdue Bhim Deo, the local ruler of Bada Khemundi as he had sided with Narayana Deo II in his activities against the British and had been his trustworthy ally since the times of the Khurda expedition.

=== Continuation of defiance to the British ===
After the British left the area towards Visakhapatnam on twelfth of December 1768, Jagannatha Gajapati Narayana Deo II again reappeared from his hiding, ousted the British Diwan Ramyogi Patra with the support of his people and even tried in secrecy to forge an agreement with the Marathas for fighting the colonists. The local rulers of Athagarh and Khalikote sided by him in his effort and actively provided him assistance. When the Marathas conveyed that they would not intervene in the matter of the British East India Company in Paralekhemundi, he attempted repeatedly to establish a connection with the French so that an agreement for assistance against the British could be made. However, Narayan Deo II died on 5 December 1771 without being able to execute his plans.

== Personality and historical impact ==
Paralakhemundi rulers had been great patrons of Odia culture and literature. The ruling Gajapati Narayana Deo II was a highly self-educated and spiritual person himself, had authored the Odia work called Sri Brundabana Bihara after he had returned from a spiritual tour of the Vrindavan. Paralakhemundi royal court found itself as a place where many renounced scholars of the time like Kabisurjya Baladeba Ratha were encouraged, rewarded and affiliated by the rulers for their contribution to music, art, culture and literature. One of Gajapati Narayana Deo II's ancestors, Sarvagya Gajapati Jagannatha Narayana Deo I wrote a Sanskrit treatise on Odissi classical music called Sangita Narayana which was venerated throughout the nation. Narayan Deo II was an adherent to the preachings of Sri Chaitanya and was a devoted Vaishnavite.

Although the efforts put together by Jagannatha Gajapati Narayana Deo II for the revival of Odisha into its past glory despite multiple external aggressors failed, his activities inspired the next series of revolts against the British by his son and step brother in 1799 A.D also known as the second phase of Pralakhemundi Affairs. There were successive revolts by the local people and the indigenous Savara tribals between the years 1813 A.D-1834 A.D and again in 1851 A.D-1856 A.D that was led by Radhakrishna Dandasena. The seventh in line descendant of Narayana Deo II, Krushna Chandra Gajapati Narayana Dev played a pivotal role in the formation of the state of Odisha in the year 1936, dedicated his life for the cause of Odia language and became the first prime minister of Odisha during the British rule.
