= Anka year =

Regnal year system used in Odisha, India

Anka year (Odia: ଅଙ୍କ Aṅka) system is a unique regnal year system used in the state of Odisha, India and was instituted by the rulers of the Eastern Ganga dynasty for dating their reigns. It had a number of features that mark the regnal year different from that actual duration of the year elapsed during the reign. The system still survives today and is used in the Odia calendar (panji) to mark the titular regnal year of the Gajapati Maharaja (King of Puri) which is currently held by Divyasingha Deva IV of the Bhoi dynasty, whose title carries the legacy of the historical ruling monarchs of Odisha.

== Description ==
The Anka system, also denoted as the Odisha style of dating refers to a special system of counting used only in Odisha which is written along with the name of the King of Puri accompanied by a simple calculation which yields the regnal year of the king. The Anka years were so popular in the Odia-speaking tracts that not only it was used in official records but also by the authors in their works and in the horoscopes prepared by the astrologers. Additional information are also provided on the lunar or solar date besides the King's Anka with the Odia calendar following the Purnimanta system of month naming.

== Features ==
- The Anka system always starts on the Odia fiscal new year called Sunia which falls on the 12th day of the bright fortnight of the month Bhadra (August–September) known as Bhādra Sukḷa Dwādasi. If the king accedes the throne for a few days before this date, then the first year of his reign would then just be a few days long.
- Coins were minted on the date of the new year and hence the first coins were given the Anka year 2, the number 1 was not used.
- All years ending in 6 were skipped. As in the Anka year 5 was followed by Anka year 7, Anka year 15 was followed by Anka year 17 and so on.
- All years ending in 0 were also skipped, except for the Anka year 10.

Hence no Anka years exist for 1, 6, 16, 20, 26, 30, 36, 40, 46, 50, 56 and so on.

== Regnal and Anka year Timeline ==
Timeline of actual Regnal year and Anka year (shown till regnal year 30)
Regnal year	1	2	3	4	5	6	7	8	9	10	11	12	13	14	15	16	17	18	19	20	21	22	23	24	25	26	27	28	29	30
Anka year	2	3	4	5	7	8	9	10	11	12	13	14	15	17	18	19	21	22	23	24	25	27	28	29	31	32	33	34	35	37

== Anka year of the current titular Gajapati Maharaja ==
Regnal & Anka year of Gajapati (titular reign since 7 July 1970)
Gregorian year	Regnal year	Odia year	Anka year
2026 CE	56	୧୪୩୪ ଉତ୍କଳାବ୍ଦ; 1434 Utkaḷābda	୭୧ ଅଙ୍କ; 71 Aṅka

- Utkaḷābda year for 2026 on 23 September.

== List of Anka year for monarchs of the ruling dynasties ==
=== Eastern Ganga dynasty ===
Ruler	Reign	Regnal year duration	Anka year duration
Anantavarman Vajrahasta III	1038-1070	32	41
Rajaraja Devendravarman I	1070-1078	8	11
Anantavarman Chodaganga	1078-1147	69	87
Kamarnava II	1147-1157	10	13
Raghava	1157-1170	13	17
Rajaraja II	1170-1190	20	25
Anivankabhima II	1190-1197	7	10
Rajaraja III	1197-1211	14	17
Anangabhima Deva III	1211-1235	24	31
Narasingha Deva I	1238-1263	26	33
Bhanudeva I	1264-1279	15	19
Narasimhadeva II	1279-1306	27	34
Bhanudeva II	1306-1328	22	28
Narasimhadeva III	1328-1352	24	31
Bhanudeva III	1352-1378	26	33
Narasimhadeva IV	1378-1414	36	45
Bhanudeva IV	1414-1434	20	25

=== Suryavamsa dynasty ===
Ruler	Reign	Regnal year duration	Anka year duration
Kapilendra Deva	1434–1470	36	44
Purushottama Deva	1470–1497	27	33
Prataparudra Deva	1497–1540	43	53
Kalua Deva	1540–1541	2	3
Kakharua Deva	1541	1	2

=== Bhoi dynasty (1st reign) ===
Ruler	Reign	Regnal year duration	Anka year duration
Govinda Vidyadhara	1541–1548	7	9
Chakrapratapa	1548–1557	9	11
Narasimha Jena	1557–1558	1	2
Raghuram Chhotaraya	1558–1560	2	3

=== Chalukya dynasty ===
Ruler	Reign	Regnal year duration	Anka year duration
Mukunda Deva	1560-68	8	10

=== Bhoi dynasty (2nd reign, Khurda-Puri) ===
Ruler	Reign	Regnal year duration	Anka year duration	Notes
Ramachandra Deva I	1568-1600	32	39	founder of Khurda Kingdom
Purusottam Deva	1600–1621	21	25	
Narasingha Deva	1621–1647	26	32	
Balabhadra Deva	1647–1657	10	12	
Mukunda Deva I	1657–1689	32	39	
Divyasingha Deva I	1689–1716	27	33	
Harekrushna Deva	1716–1720	4	5	
Gopinath Deva	1720–1727	7	9	
Ramachandra Deva II	1727–1736	9	11	
Birakesari Deva I (Bhagirathi Deva)	1736–1793	57	71	
Divyasingha Deva II	1793–1798	5	7	
Mukundeva Deva II	1798–1817	19	23	Puri Estate in 1809
Ramchandra Deva III	1817–1854	37	45	
Birakesari Deva II	1854–1859	5	7	
Divyasingha Deva III	1859–1882	23	28	
Mukundeva Deva III	1882–1926	44	54	
Ramchandra Deva IV	1926–1956	30	37	Titular since 1947(Indian independence)
Birakisore Deva III	1956–1970	14	17	
Divyasingha Deva IV	1970–current	54	68	
