= Dantapuram =

Dantapuram or Dantapura a small village in Srikakulam district of Andhra Pradesh. Known as Buddhas Tooth at Dantapura, the capital of the Kalingas. While ancient Dantapuram sank into oblivion, Kandy receives tens of thousands of visitors every month. Historians believe it to be the capital of Kalinga Kingdom. The Sacred relic was brought to Sri Lanka by Princess Hemamala & crown Prince Dantha the son and daughter of King Guhasiva from the city of Dantapuram. Emperor Asoka fought Kalinga War in 261 BC.

The word danta in Telugu language means Tooth. Dantapura, the reputed capital of ancient Kalingas. There is similarity between Dantavuram and Dantapura of the Buddhist chronicles induces me to identify Dantavuram. This identification is also corroborated by the writings of the ancient Roman geographer, Pliny who mentions about the Calingoe in his Natural History.
