= Jagannath =

Regional form of the Hindu deity Mahavishnu

Shri Jagannath
- The God of the Universe
- Venerated in: Hinduism
- Affiliation: Form of Krishna as an avatar of Vishnu
- Mantra: Om Jagannāthāya Namah; Om Namo Bhagavate Vāsudevāya
- Weapon: Sudarshana Chakra
- Symbols: Panchajanya
- Mount: Garuda
- Region: Puri
- Temple: Jagannath Temple, Puri; Odisha

Genealogy
- Siblings: Balabhadra and Subhadra
- Consort: Jaganmata

Shri Jagannath (Sanskrit: जगन्नाथ, Odia: ଶ୍ରୀ ଜଗନ୍ନାଥ, romanized: Jagannātha, lit. 'Lord of the Universe', Odia pronunciation: [dʒɔɡɔnːat̪ʰɔ]; formerly English: Juggernaut) is a Hindu deity worshipped as part of a triad along with his brother, Balabhadra, and his sister, Subhadra.

Shri Jagannath, within Odia Hinduism, is the supreme god, Purushottama, and the Para Brahman. To most Vaishnava Hindus, Jagannath is a regional form of Krishna, sometimes as a form of Vishnu. To some Shaiva and Shakta Hindus, he is a symmetry-filled tantric form of Bhairava, a fierce manifestation of Shiva associated with annihilation.

Jagannathism (a.k.a. Odia Vaishnavism) — the particular sector of Jagannath as a major deity — emerged in the Early Ages and later became an independent state regional temple-centered tradition of Vaishnavism. The idol of Shri Jagannath is a carved and decorated wooden stump with large round eyes and a symmetric face, and the idol has a conspicuous absence of hands or legs. The worship procedures, sacraments and rituals associated with Jagannath are syncretic and include rites that are uncommon in Hinduism. Unusually, the icon is made of wood and replaced with a new one at regular intervals.

The English word juggernaut was the rendition into English of "Shri Jagannath" by early British in India, and came to mean a very large and unstoppable force from accounts of the famous Ratha Yatra processions in Puri.

Shri Jagannath is considered a non-sectarian deity. He is significant regionally in the Indian states of Odisha, West Bengal, Chhattisgarh, Jharkhand, Bihar, Gujarat, Assam, Manipur and Tripura. He is also significant to the Hindus of Bangladesh. The Jagannath temple in Puri, Odisha is significant in Hinduism, and is regarded as one of the Char Dham pilgrimage sites in India. The Jagannath temple is massive, over 66 metres (215 ft) high in the Kalinga architecture style of Hindu temple architecture, and one of the best surviving specimens of Kalinga architecture, namely Odisha art and architecture. It has been one of the major pilgrimage destinations for Hindus since about 800 CE.

The annual festival called the Ratha Yatra celebrated in June or July every year in eastern states of India is dedicated to Jagannath. His image, along with the other two associated deities, is ceremoniously brought out of the sacrosanctum (Garbhagriha) of his chief temple in Puri (ଶ୍ରୀ ମନ୍ଦିର, Śrī Mandira). They are placed in a temple car which is then pulled by numerous volunteers to the Gundicha Temple (located at a distance of nearly 3 km or 1.9 mi). They stay there for eight days, and on the 9th day they are returned to the main temple. Coinciding with the Ratha Yatra festival at Puri, similar processions are organized at Jagannath temples throughout the world. It falls on the Dwitiya Tithi, the second day of the bright fortnight of the Sharad Paksha (also called Shukla Paksha), a fortnight of the Hindu lunar month of Ashadha. During the festive public procession of Jagannath in Puri, about a million of devotees visit Puri to see Jagannath in chariot.

== Etymology ==
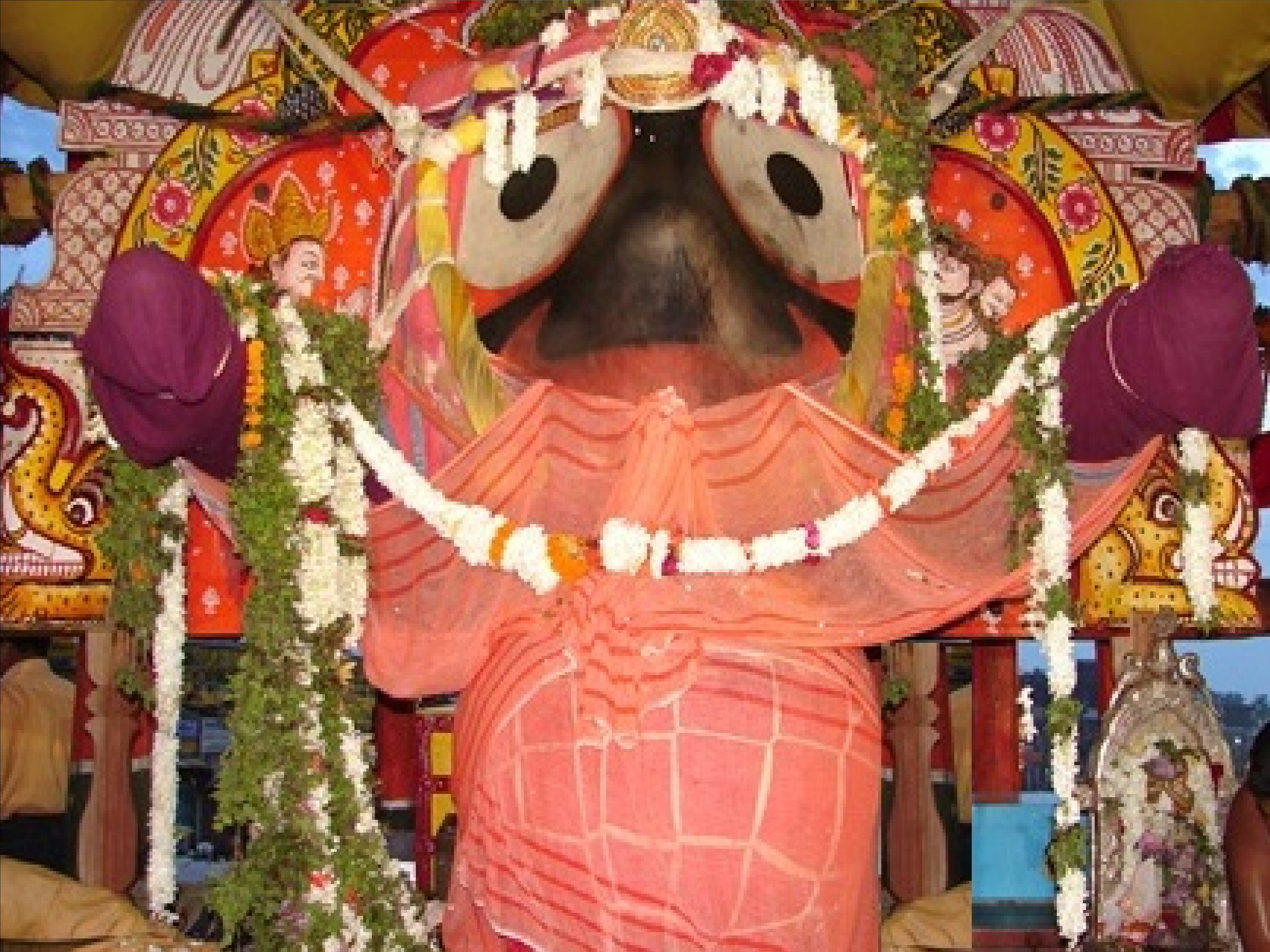
Idol of Jagannath, 2011

Shri Jagannath is a Sanskrit word, compounded of jagat meaning "universe" and nātha meaning "Master" or "Lord". Thus, Jagannath means "lord of the universe".

Jagannatha, according to them is a generic term, not unique, as much as Lokanatha or Avalokiteswara. ln fact, the name Jagannatha could be applied to any Deity which is considered supreme.

— Surendra Mohanty, Lord Jagannatha: the microcosm of Indian spiritual culture

In the Odia language, Shri Jagannath is linked to other names, such as Jagā (ଜଗା) or Jagabandhu (ଜଗବନ୍ଧୁ) ("Friend of the Universe"). Both names derive from Jagannath. Further, on the basis of the physical appearance of the deity, names like Kāḷiā (କାଳିଆ) ("The Black-coloured Lord", but which can also mean "the Timely One"), Dārubrahma (ଦାରୁବ୍ରହ୍ମ) ("The Sacred Wood-Riddle"), Dārudēbatā (ଦାରୁ ଦେବତା "The wooden god"), Cakā Ākhi (ଚକା ଆଖି) or Cakā Nayana (ଚକା ନୟନ "with round eyes"), Cakā Ḍōḷā (ଚକା ଡୋଳା "with round pupils") are also in vogue.

According to Dina Krishna Joshi, the word may have origins in the tribal word Kittung of the Sora people (Savaras). This hypothesis states that the Vedic people as they settled into tribal regions adopted the tribal words and called the deity Jagannath. According to O. M. Starza, this is unlikely because Kittung is phonetically unrelated, and the Kittung tribal deity is produced from burnt wood and looks very different from Jagannath.

== Iconography ==
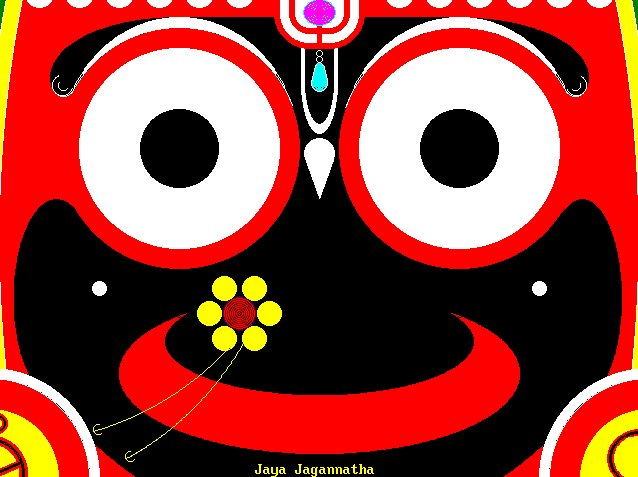
Two versions of Jagannath iconography

The icon of Shri Jagannath in his temples is a brightly painted, rough-hewn log of neem wood. The image consists of a square flat head, a pillar that represents his face merging with the chest. The icon lacks a neck, ears, and limbs, is identified by a large circular face symbolizing someone who is anādi (without beginning) and ananta (without end). Within this face are two big symmetric circular eyes with no eyelids, one eye symbolizing the sun and the other the moon, features traceable in 17th-century paintings. He is shown with an Urdhva Pundra, the Vaishnava U-shaped mark on his forehead. His dark colour and other facial features are an abstraction of the cosmic form of the Hindu god Krishna, states Starza. In some contemporary Jagannath temples, two stumps pointing forward in an embracing position represent his hands. In some exceptional medieval and modern era paintings in museums outside India (such as in Berlin), states Starza, Jagannath is shown fully anthropomorphised but with the traditional abstract mask face.

The typical icon of Shri Jagannath is unlike other deities found in Hinduism who are predominantly anthropomorphic. However, aniconic forms of Hindu deities are not uncommon. For example, Shiva is often represented in the form of a Shiva linga. In most Jagannath temples in the eastern states of India, and all his major temples such as the Puri, Odisha, Jagannath is included with his brother Balabhadra and sister Subhadra. Apart from the principal companion deities, the Jagannath icon shows a Sudarshana Chakra and sometimes under the umbrella cover of multiheaded Sesha Naga, both linking him to Vishnu.

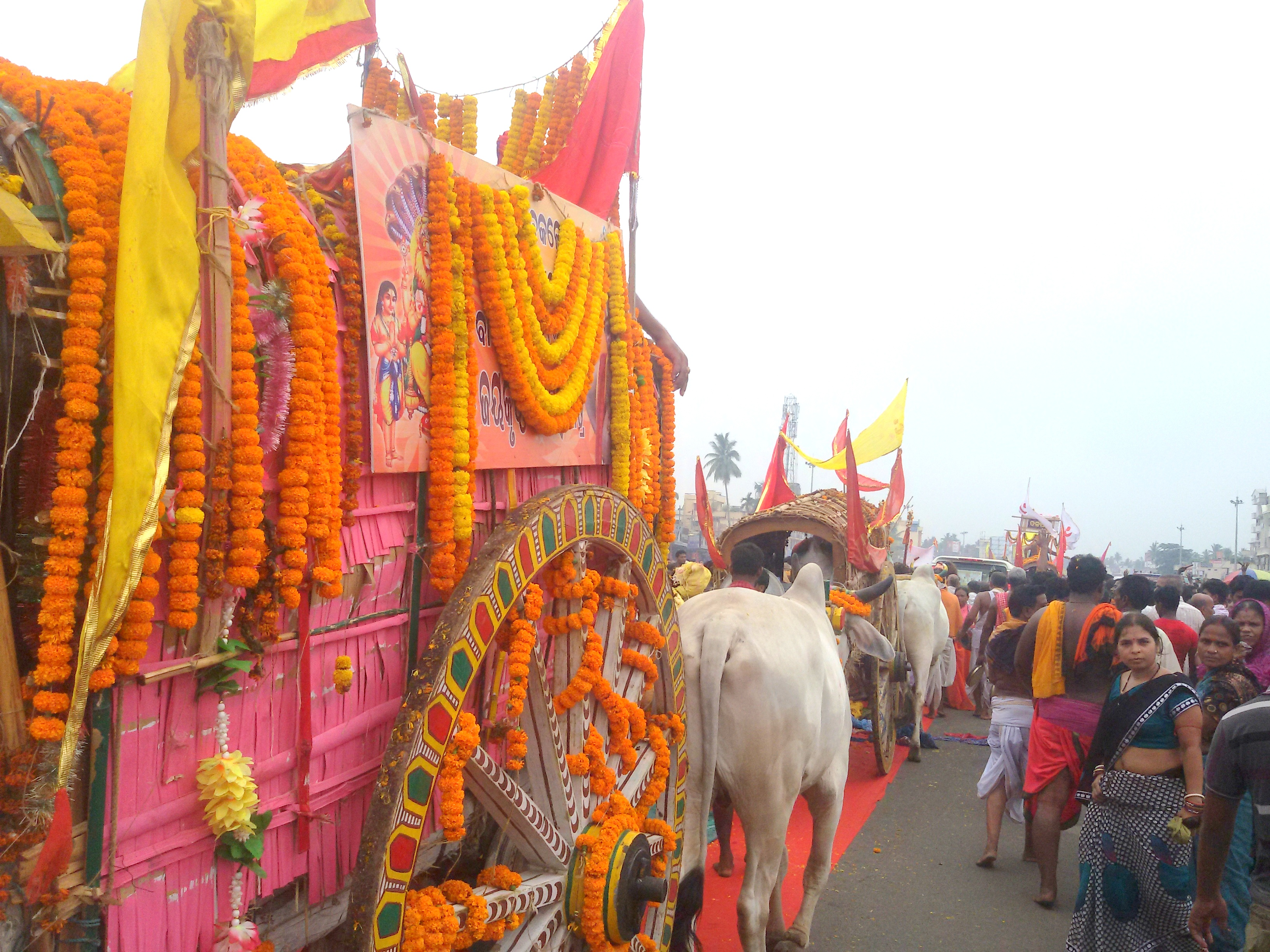
Jagannath icons are produced from wood. They are replaced every 8 or 12 or 19 years. Above: logs in transport to prepare the Jagannath icon.

When shown with Balabhadra and Subhadra, he is identifiable from his circular eyes compared to the oval or almond shape of the other two abstract icons. Further, his icon is dark, while Balabhadra's face is white, and Subhadra's icon is yellow. The third difference is the flat head of Jagannath icon, compared to semi-circular carved heads of the other two. (Note: The shape of Balabhadra's head, also called Balarama or Baladeva, varies in some temples between somewhat flat and semi-circular.) They are accompanied by the Sudarshana Chakra, the iconic weapon of Vishnu. It is approximately the same height as Balabhadra, is red in colour, carved from a wooden pillar and clothed, unlike its traditional representation as a chakra in other Vishnu temples. Jagannath iconography, when he is depicted without companions, shows only his face, neither arms nor torso. This form is sometimes called Patita Pavana, or Dadhi Vaman.

The images are unique in being made of wood, since most Hindu murtis are made of stone or metal. The murtis of Jagannath, Balabhadra, Subhadra and Sudarshana Chakra are made of neem wood. Neem wood is chosen because the Bhavishya Purana declares it to be the most auspicious wood from which to make Vishnu murtis. The idol of Jagannatha, Balabhadra, Subhadra and Sudarshana is re-painted every week in the Jagannatha Temple, Puri. It is replaced with a newly carved image every 12 or 19 years approximately, or more precisely according to the luni-solar Hindu calendar when its month of Asadha occurs twice in the same year.

=== Attributes ===
In the Jagannath tradition (Odia Vaishnavism), Jagannath is most frequently identified with an abstract form of Krishna as the supreme deity.

Jagannath is considered as equivalent to the Hindu metaphysical concepts of Brahman/Para Brahman and Purushottama/Shunya Purusha, wherein he then is the Avatarī, i.e., the cause and equivalence of all avatars and the infinite existence in space and time. According to author Dipti Ray in Prataparudra Deva, the Suryavamsi King of Odisha:

In Prataparudradeva's time Odia poets accepted Sarala Dasa's idea and expressed in their literary works as all the Avataras of Vishnu (Jagannath) manifest from him and after their cosmic play dissolute (bilaya) in him (Jagannath). According to them Jagannath is Sunnya Purusa, Nirakar and Niranjan who is ever present in Nilachala to do cosmic play ... The five Vaishnavite Sakhas ["Comrades"] of Orissa during Prataparudradeva's time expounded in their works the idea that Jagannath (Purushottama) is Purna Brahman from whom other Avataras like Rama, Krishna, etc., took their birth for lilas in this universe and at the end would merge in the self of Purna Brahman.

— Dipti Ray

In the Jagannath tradition, he has the attributes of all the avatars of Krishna/Vishnu. This belief is celebrated by dressing him and worshipping him as different avatars on special occasions. The Puranas relate that the Narasimha Avatar of Vishnu appeared from a wooden pillar. It is therefore believed that Jagannath is worshipped as a wooden murti or Daru Brahma with the Shri Narasimha hymn dedicated to the Narasimha Avatar. Every year in the month of Bhadra, Jagannath is dressed and decorated in the form of the Vamana avatar of Vishnu. Jagannath appeared in the form of Rama, another avatar of Vishnu, to Tulsidas, who worshipped him as Rama and called him Raghunath during his visit to Puri in the 16th century.

Sometimes one regards him as one of the avatars (incarnations) of Krishna (i.e., Buddha-Jagannath) or Vishnu (i.e., Vamana). His name does not appear in the traditional Dashavatara (ten avatars) of Vishnu, though in certain Odia literature, Jagannath has been treated as the avatar of Krishna, as a substitute for or the equivalent of the avatar Buddha from Dashavatara.

=== Tantric deity ===
Outside Vaishnava tradition, Jagannath is considered the epitome of Tantric worship. The symmetry in iconography, the use of mandalas and geometric patterns in its rites support the tantric connection proposal.

Jagannath is venerated as Bhairava or Shiva, the consort of the goddess Vimala, by Shaivites and Shakta sects. The priests of Jagannath Temple at Puri belong to the Shakta sect, although the Vaishnava sect's influence predominates. As part of the triad, Balabhadra is also considered to be Shiva and Subhadra, a manifestation of Parvati (or her warrior avatar Durga). In the Markandeya Purana the sage Markandeya declared that Purushottama Jagannath and Shiva are one. Jagannath in his Hathi Besha or Gaja Besha (elephant form) has been venerated by devotees like Ganapati Bappa of Maharashtra as Ganesha.

== History ==
=== Skanda Purana ===
According to the Purushottama Kshetra Mahatmya of the Skanda Purana, the deity Yama requested Vishnu to disappear from the region of Purushottama Kshetra, dissatisfied with the direct salvation of those who lived in the region in Satya Yuga. Vishnu agreed to do so. Indradyumna, the king of Avanti, grew interested in venerating the deity Nilamadhava, made of sapphire. He is described to have sent the younger brother of his royal priest, or sometimes a minister, Vidyapati, to locate the site of the deity's image in the Nilagiri region. Regional folklore states that the priest was welcomed by Vishvavasu, the chieftain of the Savara people. During the duration of his stay in the chieftain's house, the latter's daughter, Lalita, fell in love with him. Upon the chieftain's request, Vidyapati married her. He noticed that the chieftain would leave the house every evening, and only return the following noon. At his urging, Lalita revealed to him that these were her father's visits to the shrine of Nilamadhava, whose location was held secret within the community. Vidyapati persuaded his wife to ask Vishvavasu to take him along to see the image of the deity. The chieftain agreed to take Vidyapati with him, but on the condition that he be blindfolded during the journey so that the shrine's location remained undisclosed. Lalita helped her husband devise a plan: Vidyapati brought a bag of mustard seeds with him, scattering them all along the path to the shrine present in a cave, bearing witness to the deep blue image of Nilamadhava. Returning to Avanti, he reported his discovery of the shrine to Indradyumna. After a few months, following the mustards seeds that had since germinated into plants, the king and his retinue travelled to the shrine, unable to locate the image. After praying to Vishnu for three days and nights, they heard the deity's voice thunder from the heavens, rebuking them for their scheme and informing them of his omnipresence. He announced that he would manifest as a dāru (wooden image) floating by the sea. He instructed them to construct a new temple upon a mountain that stood beside the seashore for his worship.

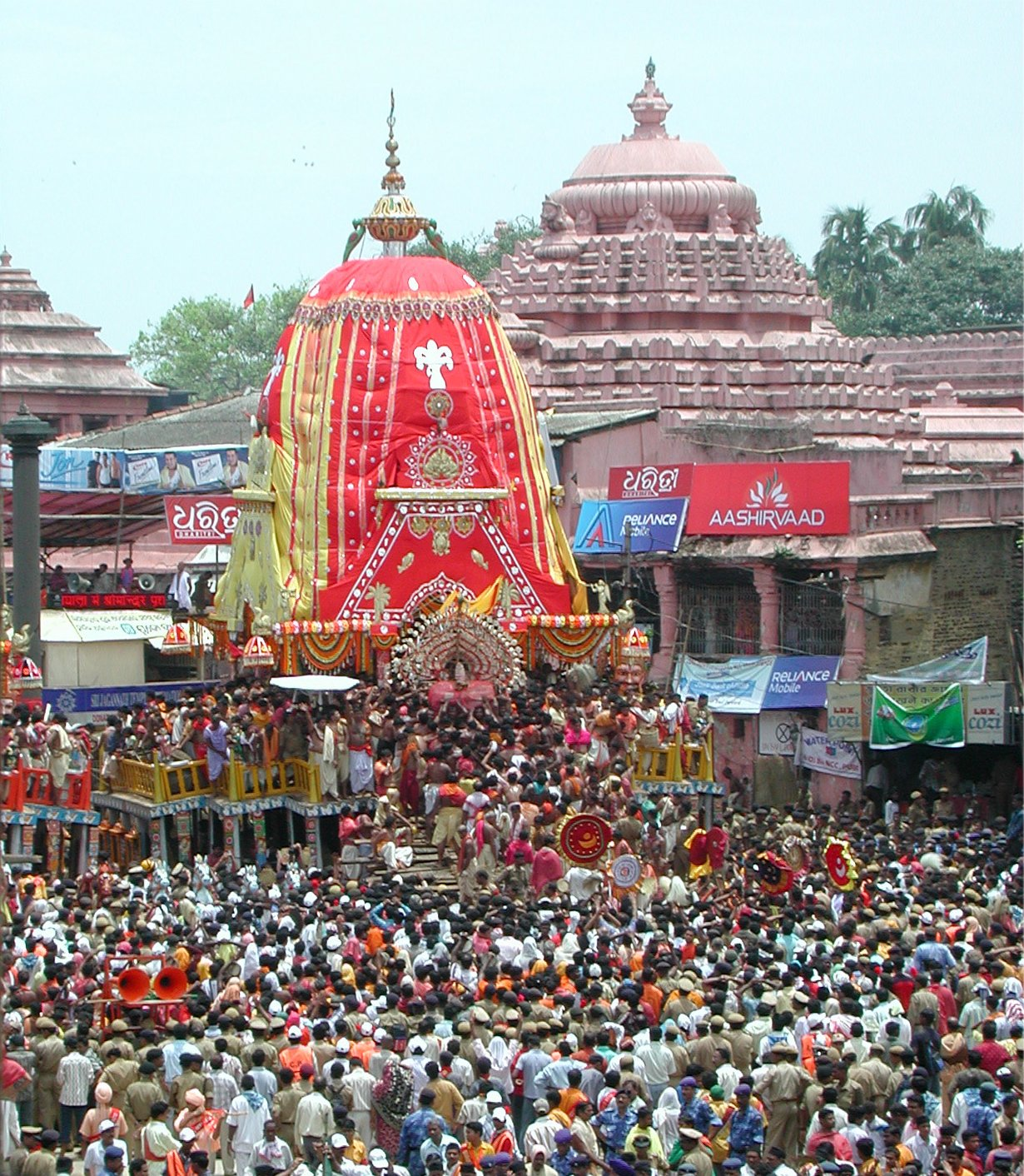
2007 Jagannath Chariot Festival in Puri, Odisha

In the Skanda Purana, by the time Vidyapati returned to inform the king of the site of the shrine, a great storm had buried the image of Nilamadhava under the sand. Despite his best attempts, the king was unable to locate the image. Upon the counsel of the sage divinity Narada, Indradyumna constructed a new temple, and performed a thousand ashvamedha yajnas at the site. Receiving guidance in the form of a divine dream, a great tree floating in the sea was felled and used to create the three wooden images of the temple, those of Jagannatha, Balarama, and Subhadra. The king travelled to Brahmaloka to invite Brahma to inaugurate the temple. With the passage of time, a king named Gala claimed to have been the temple's real architect, but with the return of Indradyumna to earth, he withdrew this claim. After Brahma had inaugurated the temple, Indradyumna returned to Brahmaloka, entrusting the upkeep of the site to Gala.

=== Vedic origin ===
In hymn 10.155.3 of the Rigveda, there is mention of a daru (wooden log) floating in the ocean as apurusham. Acharya Sayana interpreted the term apurusham as same as Purushottama and this Dara wood log being an inspiration for Jagannath, thus placing the origin of Jagannath in 2nd millennium BCE. Other scholars refute this interpretation, stating that the correct context of the hymn is "Alakshmi Stava" of Arayi.

According to Bijoy Misra, Puri natives do call Jagannatha as Purushottama, consider driftwood a savior symbol, and later Hindu texts of the region describe the Supreme Being as ever present in everything, pervasive in all animate and inanimate things. Therefore, while the Vedic connection is subject to interpretation, the overlap in the ideas exist.

According to Vishnu Puran, Purushottama Kshetra was in the ocean. The modern location was identified as Purushottama Kshetra later. According to a copper plate grant by Rajaraja Deva III (father of Anangabhima Deva III), Lord Purushottama was in the ocean and Chodaganga Deva constructed a suitable temple for him.

=== Buddhist origins ===
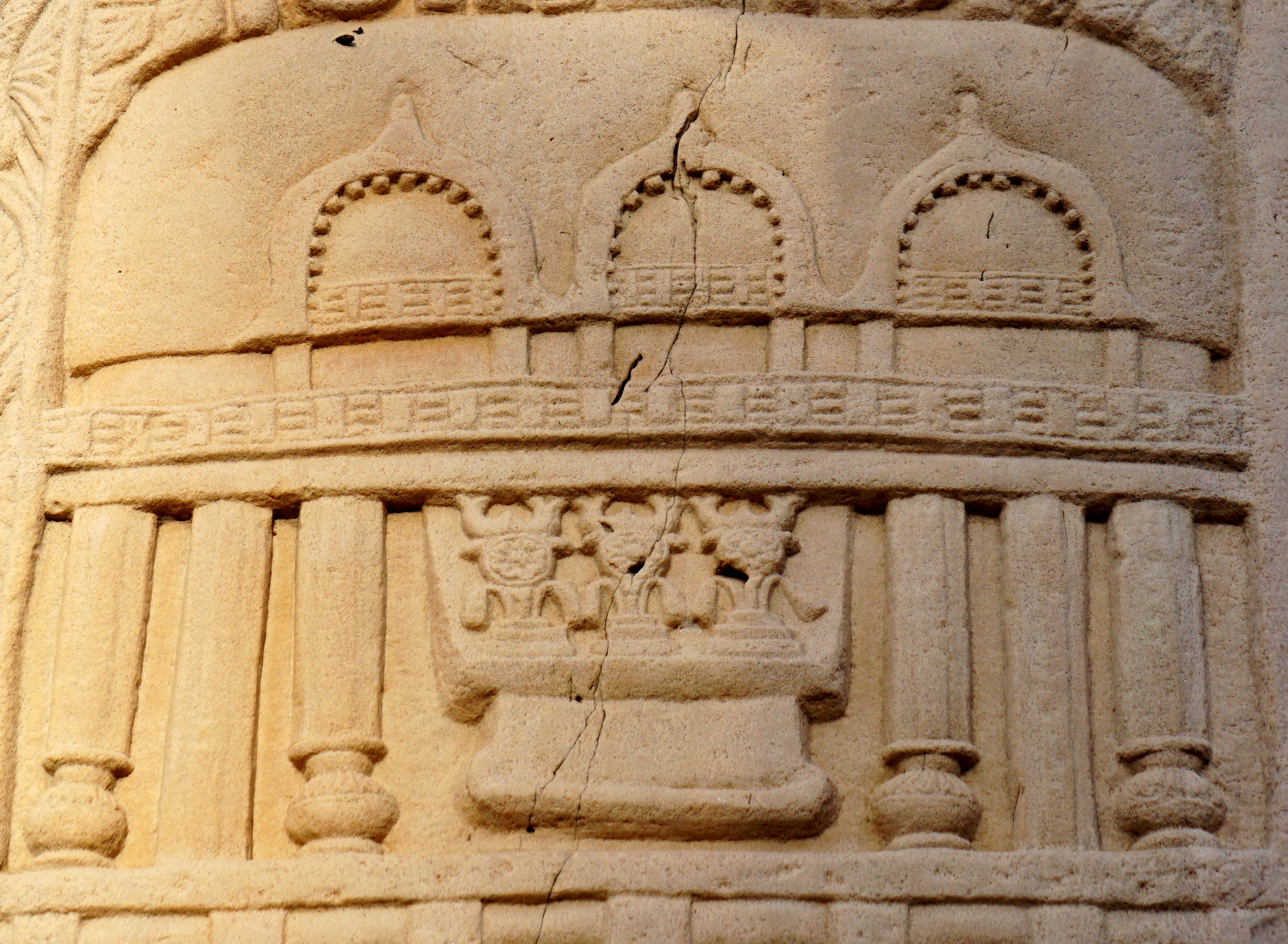
Three Buddhist symbols in the upper panel, east face, of the left pillar of the southern gateway at Sanchi. Alexander Cunningham examined a sketch of these three symbols and believed the modern Jagannath and his siblings are based on this Triratna symbol of Buddha, Dhamma and Sangha. Harekrushna Mahatab also believes the idol triad to be the wooden transformation of the Buddhist Triratna. But Starza argues that these Buddhist symbols bear little resemblance to the modern Jagannath triad.

Theories suggesting Buddhist origins of Jagannatha stems from the relic worship associated with Jagannatha, a concept integral to Buddhism but alien to Hinduism. For example, there exists an unexamined relic in the Jagannath shrine in Puri, and the local legends state that the shrine relic contains a tooth of Gautama Buddha – a feature common to many cherished Theravada Buddhist shrines in and outside India. Buddhism anciently prevailed in Odisha as appears from the Buddhist remains still existing. The idols of Jagannatha are believed to contain the heart (especially) and the bones of Krishna even though it forms no part of the Brahmanical religion to collect and adore dead men's bones while it is a most meritorious act among the Buddhists to collect and preserve the relics of departed saints, and the places that contain them are esteemed peculiarly holy. In Buddhism, preserving cetiya or skeletal parts such as "Buddha's tooth" or relics of dead saints is a thriving tradition. The existence of these legends, state some scholars such as Stevenson, suggests that Jagannath may have a Buddhist origin. In ancient times, the place of Purī was known as Danta-Pura, i.e., the city where the sacred tooth of Buddha has been preserved.

Swami Vivekananda, in his book Lectures from Colombo to Almora, mentioned that Jagannath temple was once a Buddhist temple.

Another evidence that links Jagannath to Buddhism is the Ratha-Yatra festival for Jagannath, the stupa-like shape of the temple and a dharmachakra-like discus (chakra) at the top of the spire. The major annual procession festival has many features found in the Mahayana Buddhism traditions. Faxian, the ancient Chinese pilgrim and visitor to India wrote c. 400 CE about a Buddhist procession in his memoir, and this has very close resemblances with the Jagannath festivities. Further the season in which the Ratha-Yatra festival is observed is about the same time when the historic public processions welcomed Buddhist monks for their temporary, annual monsoon-season retirement.

There is no distinction of caste inside the Jagganath temple, many day-to-day services (vidhis) of Lord Jagannatha owe their origin either to Jainism or to Buddhism or the combination of both, the local legends link the idols with aboriginal tribes and the daitapatis (servitors) claim to be descendants of the aboriginals. Majority of rituals are based on Oddiyana Tantras which are the refined versions of Mahayana Tantras as well as Shabari Tantras which are evolved from Tantric Buddhism and tribal believes respectively. According to Starza, these practices are also connected to Tantric practices.

Buddha was assimilated as Vishnu's ninth avatar in Vishnu Puran as a divinely incarnated purveyor of illusion. It states that Vishnu's descent as the Buddhavatara was accomplished so that the wicked and demonic could be only further misled away from the truth in kali yuga. This assimilation and the consequent "disingenuous interpretation" or rationale for his inclusion aptly articulate the considerable ambivalence characteristic of Hindu attitudes towards Buddhism, "undermining his historicity", to "make him an appendage" of the Vaisnava mythic hierarchy. But in the opening chapter of his Gita Govinda, the poet Jayadeva claims that Vishnu reincarnated as the Buddha to condemn the animal sacrifices prevalent in Vedic times. In the Jagannath cult, Jagannath is sometimes represented as the ninth avatar of Vishnu substituting Buddha, when it could have been substituted for any other avatar. Buddha is even now called Jagannath in Nepalese Buddhism.

The association of Jagannath with the ninth avatar Buddha continued until 15th century. In a Kabir panth scripture Laxmanbodh in Kabir Sagar by Dharamdas, disciple of Kabir, Jagannath is identified as a form of Buddha.

Kali Yuga has come. I am established as Buddha. Jagannath is my name. I am established with this method. (Note: Original: अब कलियुग बैठेगा सोई। बौद्ध थापना हमरो होई॥ जगन्नाथ मम नाम है सोई। हमरी थापना यहि विधि होई॥)

In the form of Rama he killed Ravana. In the form of Krishna he defeated Kamsa. Jagannath came in the form of Buddha. And so he has lots of divine play. (Note: Original: राम रूप होय रावन मारा। कृष्ण रूप होयकंस पछारा॥ बौध रूप जगन्नाथ ओतारा। लीला बहुत भांति सम्हारा॥)

According to Starza, these manifestations of the Jagannath cult, such as the supposed tooth relic of Buddha, the Ratha-Yatra, the absence of caste rules in the temple, and the identification of Jagannath with the Buddha, are not sufficient to establish a Buddhist origin of the worship of Jagannath.

Indrabhuti, the ancient Buddhist king of Oddiyana, describes Jagannath as a Buddhist deity in Jñānasiddhi. This is the oldest known direct mention of the deity.

Pranipatya Jagannatham Sarvajina Vararchitam. Sarva Buddha Mayam Siddhi Vyapinam Gaganopamam.

Abhinav Patra argues that it has not been historically ascertained whether the deity Jagannath as worshipped by Indrabhuti was just a coincidental homonym with the present Jagannath or referred to the same deity.

The 10th century era text Kubjikāmatatantra mentions Biraja (ancient capital of Utkala) as the goddess of Oddiyana, with which Indrabhuti's son Padmasambhava is associated. The Saddharmapundarika records a prophecy in which the Lord assures Śāriputra, that he would be in a distant future time a Buddha under the name of Padmaprabha, and that his place of enlightenment would be Biraja. Padmasambhava and Tārā, along with other deities are invoked in an inscription of 25 lines incised in nail-headed characters of the late 8th-9th century on the back of an image of Avalokiteśvara/Mahākaruṇā at Udaygiri not far from Jajpur, which states that a stupa with a relic inside and dwelt in by the Tathāgata was set up on that very spot. The stupa is believed to have contained the relics of Padmasambhava. Though the site is only partially excavated, at least one stupa has been unearthed. According to Nabin Kumar Sahu, this mass of evidence, supports the belief that Indrabhuti was the king of Odisha which is same as Oddiyana or Odra-pitha, of which the main deities are Jagganath and Viraja.

Some scholars argue that evidences of Jagannatha's Buddhist nature are found from medieval Odia literature. Many medieval Odia poets suggest to their readers, that they wrote their books on the commands of a formless god-like personality, identifying the Buddhist principles of Śūnya (The great void) and Alekha (The formless one) with Jagannath himself. The idols of Jagannath triad are not anthropomorphic like Hindu idols, but instead are stumps of wood with crude symbolic facial features and stumpy obtrusions for limbs.

Odia poet Sarala Dasa of 15th century in his Mahabharata, describes Lord Jagannatha as a form of Buddha.

He remains in the throne inside the temple, holding the Conch and Discus in the form of Buddha. (Note: Original: ଦେଉଳ ଭିତରେ ସିଂହ୍ରାସନେ ବିଜେ ହୋଇ ବଉଦ୍ଧ ରୁପରେ ପ୍ରଭୁ ଶଙ୍ଗଚକ୍ର ବହି ।)

Salute thee Shri Jagannath the revered One whose domain is the Blue Hills, he sits pretty as Shri Buddha there in the Blue Cavern. (Note: Original: ବନ୍ଦଇ ଶ୍ରୀ ଜଗନ୍ନାଥ ବଇକୁଣ୍ଠବାସୀ ବୌଦ୍ଧରୁପେ ନୀଲଗିରି ଶିଖେ ଅଛ ବସି ।)

There comes Shri Jagannath as Buddha to liberate the Mankind... (Note: Original: ସଂସାରଜନ୍ମକୁ ତରିବା ନିମନ୍ତେ ବୁଦ୍ଧରୂପରେ ବିଜେ ଅଛେ ଜଗନ୍ନାଥେ ।)

— Sarala Dasa

At another part in Adi Parva he also says: Glory be to Rama-Krishna-Brahma as Subhadra and to the great soul Buddha... Satyabrata Das believes this to be the wonderful integration of all faiths.

=== Jain origins ===
Pandit Nilakantha Das suggested that Jagannath was a deity of Jain origin because of the appending of Nath to many Jain Tirthankars. He felt Jagannath meant the 'World personified' in the Jain context and was derived from Jinanath. Evidence of the Jain terminology such as of Kaivalya, which means moksha or salvation, is found in the Jagannath tradition. Similarly, the twenty two steps leading to the temple, called the Baisi Pahacha, have been proposed as symbolic reverence for the first 22 of the 24 Tirthankaras of Jainism.

According to Annirudh Das, the original Jagannath deity was influenced by Jainism and is none other than the Jina of Kalinga taken to Magadha by Mahapadma Nanda. The theory of Jain origins is supported by the Jain Hathigumpha inscription. It mentions the worship of a relic memorial in Khandagiri-Udayagiri, on the Kumara hill. This location is stated to be same as the Jagannath temple site. However, states Starza, a Jain text mentions the Jagannath shrine was restored by Jains, but the authenticity and date of this text is unclear.

Another circumstantial evidence supporting the Jain origins proposal is the discovery of Jain images inside as well as near the massive Puri temple complex, including those carved into the walls. However, this could also be a later addition, or suggestive of tolerance, mutual support or close relationship between the Jains and the Hindus.

According to Starza, the Jain influence on the Jagannath tradition is difficult to assess given the sketchy uncertain evidence. Nothing establishes that the Jagannath tradition has a Jain origin.

=== Vaishnava origins ===
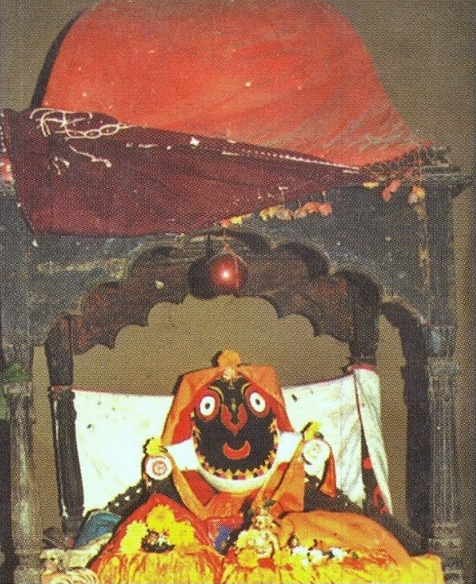
An old Dadhivaman deity in Kendrapara, Odisha. Shrila Bhaktivinoda Thakur's great forefather Krishnananda Dutta Chaudhury started worshipping this deity in mid-14th century AD.

The Vaishnava origin theories rely on the iconographic details and the typical presence of the triad of deities, based on original scriptures of Hinduism. The colors, state the scholars of the Vaishnava origin theory, link to black-colored Krishna and white-colored Balarama. They add that the goddess originally was Ekanamsha (Durga of Shaiva-Shakti tradition, sister of Krishna through his foster family). She was later renamed to Subhadra (Lakshmi) per Vaishnava terminology for the divine feminine.

It is certainly true that the Vaishnava Hindus in the eastern region of India worshipped the triad of Balarama, Ekanamsha and Krishna. There are many scriptural references to support the same. Further, in many Jagannath temples of central and eastern regions of India, the Shiva icons such as the Linga-yoni are reverentially incorporated, since Lord Shiva is a Vaishnav according to the conclusion of Bhagavata Purana, he protects Shri Jagannath Temple from external calamities, just like he does so in his form of Hanuman for the palace of Shri Rama.

=== Tribal origins ===
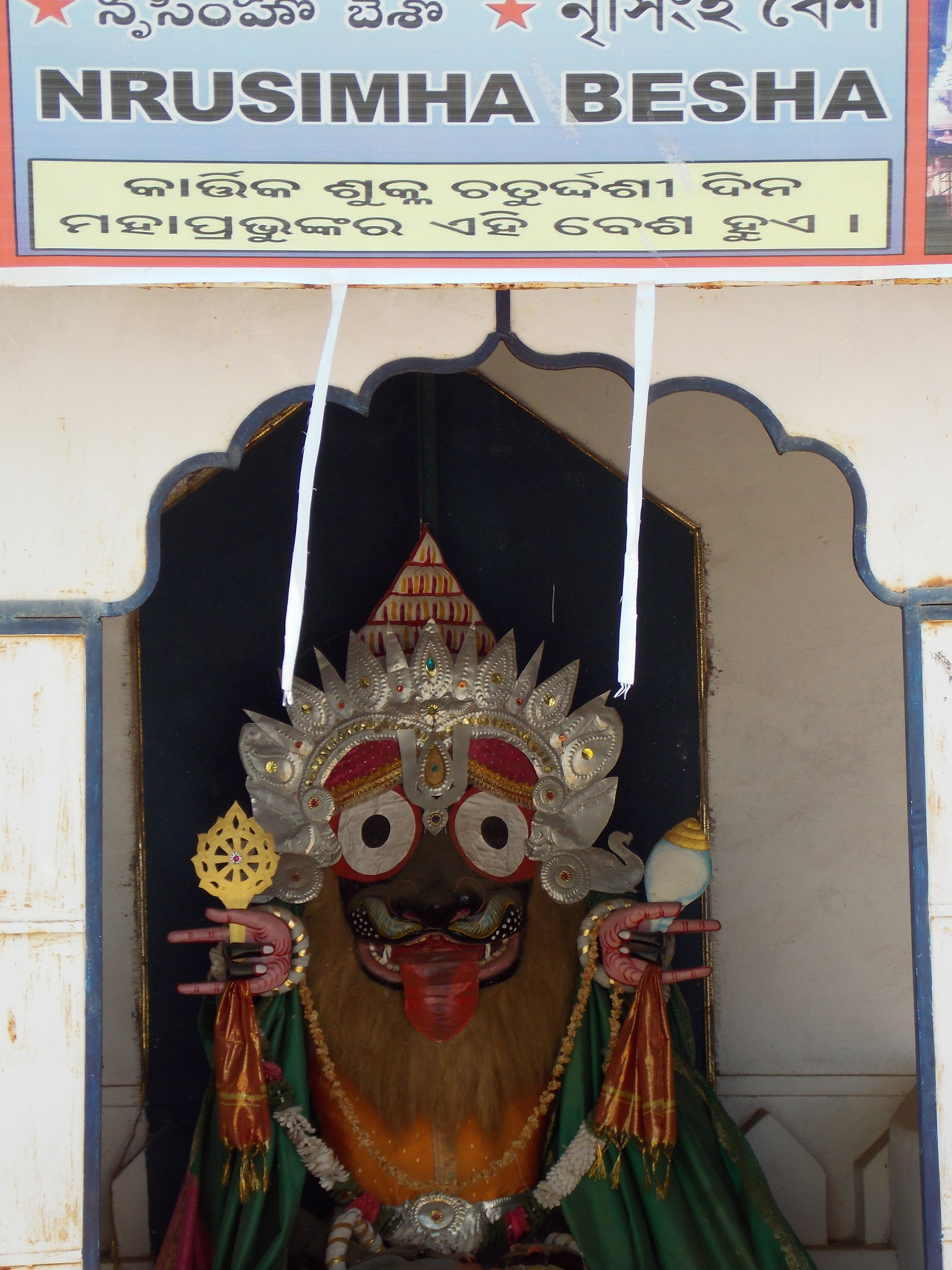
Jagannath in the Narasimha or Nrusingha Besha in Koraput

The tribal origin theories rely on circumstantial evidence and inferences such as the Jagannath icon is non-anthropomorphic and non-zoomorphic. The hereditary priests in the Jagannath tradition of Hinduism include non-Brahmin servitors, called Daitas, which may be an adopted grandfathered practice with tribal roots. The use of wood as a construction material for the Jagannath icons may also be a tribal practice that continued when Hindus adopted prior practices and merged them with their Vedic abstractions. The Daitas are Hindu, but believed to have been the ancient tribe of Sabaras (also spelled Soras). They continue to have special privileges such as being the first to view the new replacement images of Jagannath carved from wood approximately every 12 years. Further, this group is traditionally accepted to have the exclusive privilege of serving the principal meals and offerings to Jagannath and his associate deities.

According to Verrier Elwin, Jagannatha in a local legend was a tribal deity who was coopted by a Brahmin priest. The original tribal deity, states Elwin, was Kittung which too is made from wood. According to the Polish Indologist Olgierd M. Starza, this is an interesting parallel but a flawed one because the Kittung deity is produced by burning a piece of wood and too different in its specifics to be the origin of Jagannath. According to another proposal by Stella Kramrisch, log as a symbol of Anga pen deity is found in central Indian tribes and they have used it to represent features of the Hindu goddess Kali with it. However, states Starza, this theory is weak because the Anga pen features a bird or snake like attached head along with other details that make the tribal deity unlike the Jagannath.

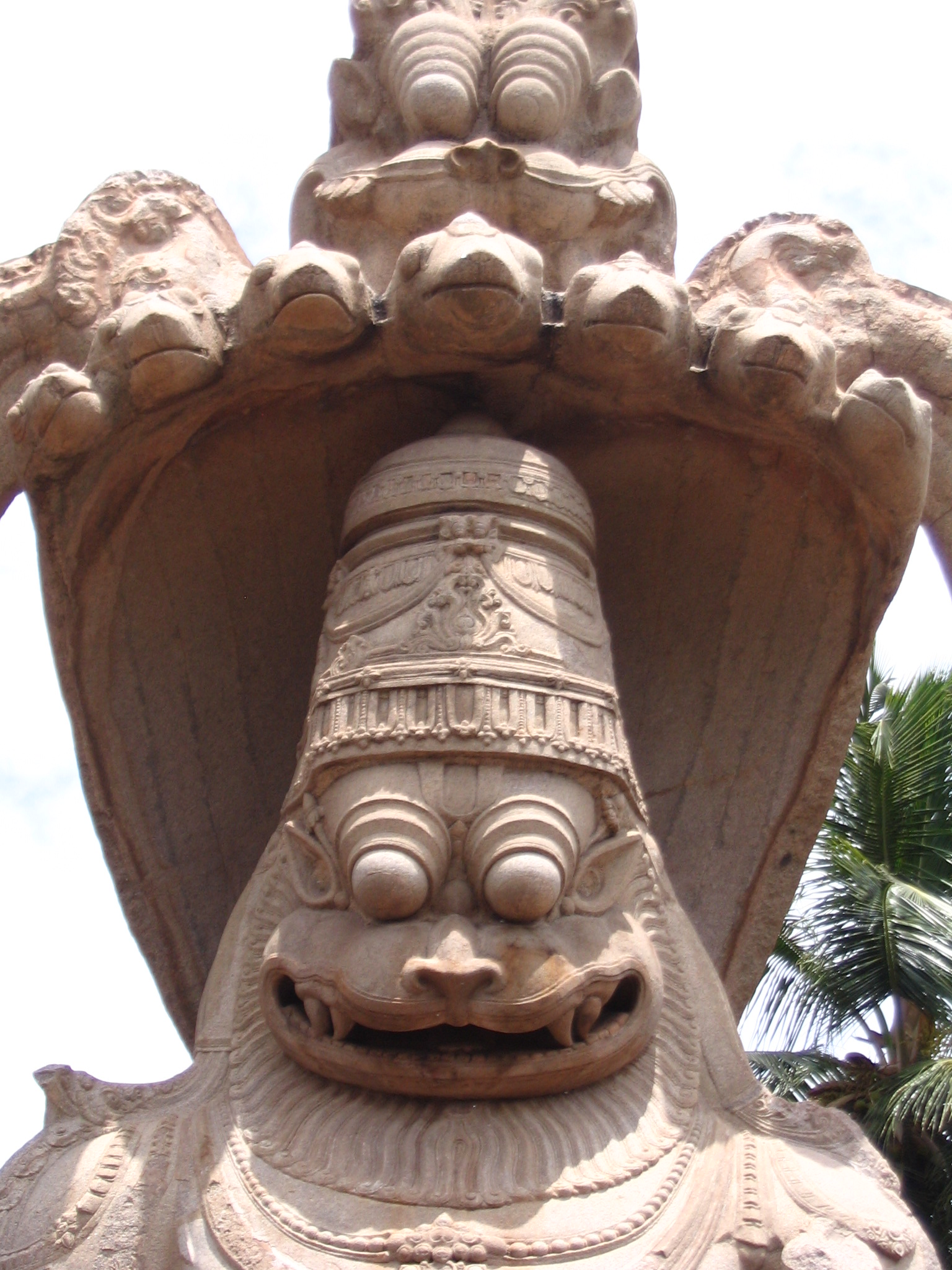
Jagannath (left) may have roots in Narasimha (right, man-lion avatar of Vishnu who fights evil demon and ends religious persecution).

Some scholars such as Kulke and Tripathi have proposed tribal deities such as Stambheshwari or Kumbheshwari to be a possible contributor to the Jagannath triad. However, according to Starza, these are not really tribal deities, but Shaiva deities adopted by tribes in eastern states of India. Yet another proposal for tribal origins is through the medieval era cult of Lakshmi-Narasimha. This hypothesis relies on the unusual flat head, curved mouth and large eyes of Jagannath, which may be an attempt to abstract an image of a lion's head ready to attack. While the tribal Narasimha theory is attractive states Starza, a weakness of this proposal is that the abstract Narasimha representation in the form does not appear similar to the images of Narasimha in nearby Konark and Kalinga temple artworks.

In contemporary Odisha, there are many Dadhivaman temples with a wooden pillar god, and this may be same as Jagannath.

=== Syncretic origins ===
According to H.S. Patnaik and others, Jagannath is a syncretic/synthetic deity that combined aspects of major faiths like Shaivism, Shaktism, Vaishnavism, Jainism, and Buddhism. Krishnaite sampradayas, as example, Gaudiya Vaishnavas, have identified him strongly with Krishna. In Gaudiya Vaishnava tradition, Balabhadra is the elder brother Balarama, Jagannath is the younger brother Krishna, and Subhadra is the youngest sister.

Balabhadra, considered the elder brother of Jagannath, is sometimes identified with and worshipped as Shiva. Subhadra now considered Jagannath's sister has also been considered as a deity who used to be Brahma. Finally the fourth deity, Sudarshana Chakra symbolizes the wheel of the sun's chariot, a syncretic absorption of the Saura (Surya-centric) tradition of Hinduism. The conglomerate of Jagannath, Balabhadra, Subhadra, and Sudarshana Chakra worshipped together on a common platform are called the Chaturdhamurti or the "four-fold form".

O.M. Starza states that the Jagannath Ratha Yatra may have evolved from the syncretism of procession rituals for Shiva lingas, Vaishnava pillars, and tribal folk festivities. The Shaiva element in the tradition of Jagannath overlap with the rites and doctrines of Tantrism and Shaktism. According to the Shaivas, Jagannath is Bhairava. The Shiva Purana mentions Jagannatha as one of the 108 names of Shiva. The Tantric literary texts identify Jagannath with Mahabhairava. Another evidence that supports syncretism thesis is the fact that Jagannath sits on the abstract tantric symbols of the Shri Yantra. Further, his Shri Chakra ("holy wheel") is worshipped in the bījamantra 'klim', which is also the bījamantra of Kali or Shakti. The representation of Balarama as Sheshanaga or Sankarshana bears testimony to the influence of Shaivism on the cult of Jagannath. The third deity, Devi Subhadra, who represents the Shakti element is still worshipped with the Bhuvaneshvari mantra.

The Tantric texts claim Jagannath to their own, to be Bhairava, and his companion to be the same as goddess Vimala is the Shakti. The offerings of Jagannath becomes mahaprasad only after it is re-offered to goddess Vimala. Similarly, different Tantric features of yantras have been engraved on the Ratna Vedi, where Jagannath, Balabhadra, and Subhadra are set up. The Kalika Purana depicts Jagannath as a Tantric deity. According to Avinash Patra, the rituals and special place accepted for non-Brahmin Daitas priests in Jagannath tradition, who co-exist and work together with Brahmin priests suggests that there was a synthesis of tribal and Brahmanical traditions.

According to the Jain version, the image of Jagannath (black colour) represents shunya, Subhadra symbolises creative energy and Balabhadra (white colour) represents the phenomenal universe. All these images have evolved from the Nila Madhava, the ancient Kalinga Jina. The Sudarshana Chakra is contended to be the Hindu name of the Dharmachakra of Jaina symbol.

In the words of the historian Jadunath Sarkar:

The diverse religions of Orissa in all ages have tended to gravitate towards and finally merged into the Jagannath worship, at least in theory.

=== Transformation from unitary icon to triad ===
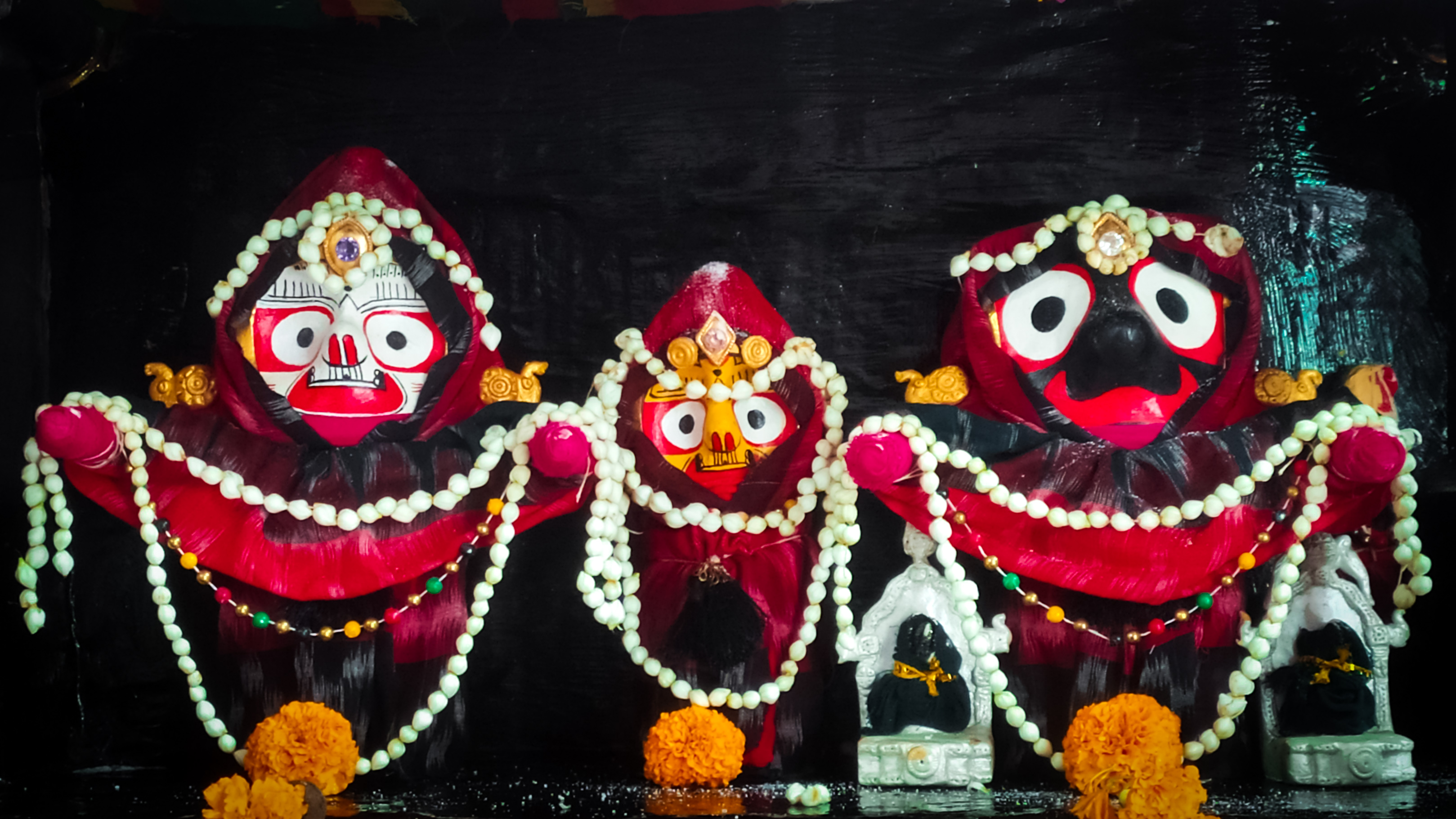
Jagannath with Balabhadra and Subhadra

The Madala Panji observes that Nila Madhava transformed into Jagannath and was worshipped alone as a unitary figure, not as the part of a triad. It is significant to note that the early epigraphic and literary sources refer only to a unitary deity Purushottama Jagannath. The Sanskrit play Anargharāghava composed by Murāri mentioned only Purushottama Jagannath and his consort Lakshmi with no references to Balabhadra and Subhadra. The Dasgoba copper plated inscription dating to 1198 also mentions only Purushottama Jagannath in the context that the Puri temple had been originally built by the Eastern Ganga king Anantavarman Chodaganga (1078–1147) for Vishnu and Lakshmi. These sources are silent on the existence of Balabhadra and Subhadra. Such state of affairs has led to arguments that Purushottama was the original deity and Balabhadra and Subhadra were subsequently drawn in as additions to a unitary figure and formed a triad.

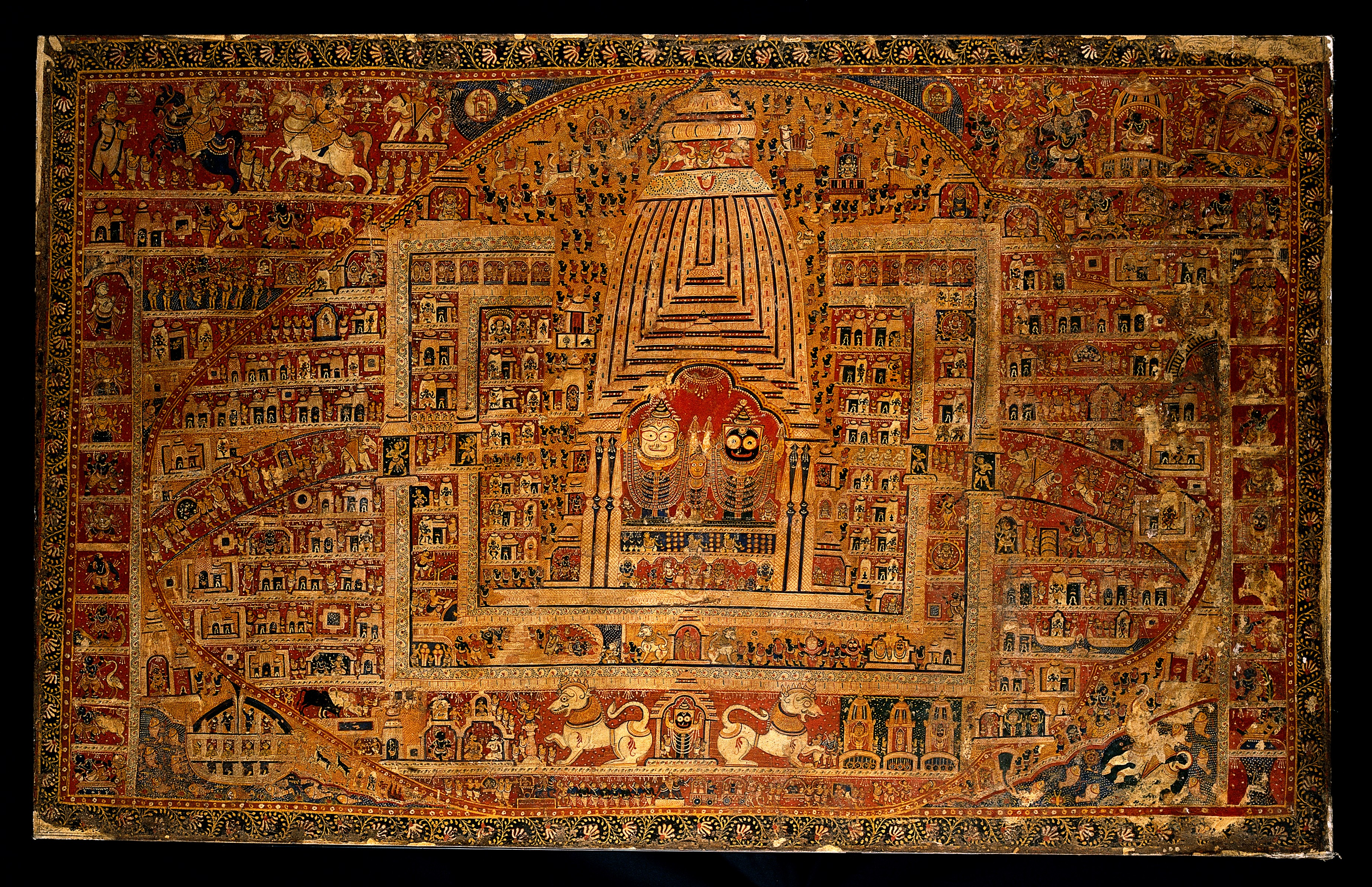
Balarama, Subhadra and Jagannath in the temple at Puri, with many human and sacred figures, buildings and animals. Oil painting by a painter of Puri, Odisha, ca. 1880/1910.

During the rule of Anangabhima Deva III (1211–1239), Balabhadra and Subhadra find the earliest known mention in the Pataleshwara (temples I, II and III) inscription of 1237 CE. According to the German Indologist Kulke, Anangibhima Deva III was the originator of the triad of Jagannath, Balabhadra, and Subhadra suggesting that Balabhadra was added after Lakshmi's transformation into Subhadra.

== Theology ==
The theology and rituals associated with the Jagannath tradition combine Vedic, Puranic and Tantric themes. He is the Vedic-Puranic Purushottama (lit. 'One who is the Supreme Purusha, beyond the kṣara (destructible — i.e., Prakṛti), and akṣara (indestructible — i.e., Atman)'), as well as the Puranic Narayana and the tantric Bhairava. According to the Vishnudharmottara Purana (ca. 4th century), Krishna is worshipped in the form of Purushottama in Odra (Odisha). He is same as the metaphysical Para Brahman, the form of Krishna that prevades as abstract kāla (time) in Vaishnava thought. He is abstraction which can be inferred and felt but not seen, just like time. Jagannath is chaitanya (consciousness), and his companion Subhadra represent Shakti (energy) while Balabhadra represents Jñāna (knowledge). According to Salabega, the Jagannath tradition assimilates the theologies found in Vaishnavism, Shaivism, Shaktism, Buddhism, Jainism, Yoga and Tantra traditions.

The Jagannath theology overlaps with those of Krishna. For example, the 17th-century Odia classic Rasa Kallola by Dinakrushna Dasa opens with a praise to Jagannath, then recites the story of Krishna with an embedded theology urging the pursuit of knowledge, love and devotion to realize the divine in everything. The 12th-century Jagannatha Vijaya in Kannada language by Rudrabhatta is a mixed prose and poetry style text which is predominantly about Krishna. It includes a canto that explains that "Hari (Vishnu), Hara (Shiva) and Brahma" are aspects of the same supreme soul. Its theology, like the Odia text, centers around supreme light being same as "love in the heart". The 15th-century Bhakti scholar Shankaradeva of Assam became a devotee of Jagannath in 1481, and wrote love and compassion inspired plays about Jagannath-Krishna that influenced the region and remain popular in Assam and Manipur.

The medieval-era Odia scholars such as Ananta, Achyutananda Dasa and Chaitanya Mahaprabhu described the theology of Jagannath as the "personification of the Shunya, or the void", but not entirely in the form of Shunyata of Buddhism. They state Jagannath as "Shunya Brahma", or alternatively as "Nirguna Purusha" (or "abstract personified cosmos"). Vishnu avatars are descend from this Shunya Brahma into human form to keep dharma.

=== Jagannath’s Name in Every Month ===
- January (Magha) – Padmanabha
- February (Phalguna) – Purushottama
- March (Chaitra) – Satya Narayana
- April (Vaishakha) – Madhava
- May (Jyeshtha) – Shri Hari
- June (Ashadha) – Jagannatha
- July (Shravana) – Vamandeva
- August (Bhadrapada) – Shridhara
- September (Ashwin) – Raghunatha
- October (Kartika) – Damodara
- November (Agrahayana) – Vasudeva
- December (Pausha) – Ananta Narayana

== In Hindu texts and traditions ==
=== Puranic Accounts ===
The structural manifestation and origin of the deities at Jagannath Puri are extensively detailed within the Sanskrit Mahāpurāṇas, primarily within the Puruṣōttama-kṣētra-māhātmya section of the Skanda Purana and the Indradyumna narrative cycle in the Brahma Purana . According to these texts, the events transpired during the Satya Yuga under King Indradyumna of Avanti. The king sought to worship Nīla Mādhava, a sacred sapphire form of Vishnu secretly kept by a tribal Śabara chief named Vishvavasu in the forests of Utkala, but the deity miraculously vanished into the coastal sands before the king could arrive. Instructed by a divine voice, Indradyumna performed a series of horse sacrifices (Ashvamedha), at the culmination of which a massive, fragrant log of neem wood naturally marked with Vishnu's emblems the conch and disc floated ashore. This sacred timber was recognized as the Dāru-brahman (lit. 'the Absolute manifested in wood'). Lord Vishnu disguised himself as an elderly, master artisan (traditionally identified as Vishvakarma) and agreed to carve the images on the condition that he remain completely undisturbed for twenty-one days inside the sealed temple pavilion. However, anxious after fifteen days of absolute silence, King Indradyumna opened the doors prematurely. The divine carpenter instantly vanished, leaving behind the abstract, unfinished wooden forms of Jagannath, Balabhadra, and Subhadra without defined hands or feet. The creator god Brahma consoled the distressed king, explaining that the Supreme Lord chose to manifest in this abstract, limbless shape to demonstrate that the divine can perceive and bless the cosmos without physical sensory organs. Brahma then served as the chief priest to formally consecrate the deities, awaken their spiritual eyes, and establish Puri as a sacred Kshetra.

=== Ramayana and Mahabharata ===
According to Prabhat Nanda, the Valmiki Ramayana mentions Jagannath. Some believe that the mythical place where King Janak performed a yajna and tilled land to obtain Sita is the same as the area in which the Gundicha temple is situated in Puri, according to Suryanarayan Das. The Mahabharata, states Das, describes King Indradyumna's Ashvamedh Yajna and the advent of the four deities of the Jagannath cult.

=== Ecstatic Manifestation (Mahābhāva Prakāśa) ===
In Gaudiya Vaishnavism, the distinct iconography of Jagannath is attributed to a popular devotional lore known as Mahābhāva Prakāśa (lit. 'the manifestation of supreme spiritual ecstasy'). This narrative is explicitly documented in the 16th-century Odia text Mahābhāva Prakāśa, composed by Kanhei Khuntia, which serves as the regional source for this account. According to this Odia text, while Krishna was ruling as a prince in Dvārakā, his deep longing for his childhood home caused him to call out the names of the gōpīs of Vrindavan in his sleep. Curious about this intense attachment, his queens requested mother Rohini—who had lived in Vrindavan during Krishna's youth—to describe his childhood pastimes. To maintain absolute privacy, Krishna's sister Subhadra stood guard at the doorway. However, as she overheard the descriptions of the unconditional devotion of the Vrindavan residents, she became completely captivated by the spiritual emotion, causing her eyes to widen and her limbs to retract inward. When Krishna and Balarama walked up to the entrance and overheard the stories, they too were overwhelmed by the highest state of spiritual ecstasy (mahābhāva). Swept up in intense divine love and the raw pain of emotional separation (vipralambha-bhāva), their eyes dilated in wonder and their limbs retracted completely into their bodies in a tortoise-like state of deep internal absorption. The sage Narada, witnessing this ecstatic transformation of the three siblings at the doorway, prayed that they manifest permanently in this exact form to grant blessings (darshana) to the world—a request eventually fulfilled through the wooden icons at Puri.

=== Sarala Dasa's Mahabharata ===
The 15th-century Mahabharata (Mausala Parva) composed by the Odia poet Sarala Dasa, the origin of Jagannath is linked to the transition of the Krishna avatar. According to this narrative, Krishna's departure from the mortal world is framed as an illusory death (māyā-līlā). Following his death by arrow of the hunter Jara Savara, Arjuna/Jara attempts to cremate body, but the piṇḍa (body or its remains/relics) withstands the fire. Following a celestial command, Jara casts this unburnt piṇḍa (body) into the ocean, where it later transforms over time into the sacred timber (dāru) retrieved by King Indradyumna.

=== Kanchi conquest ===
One of the most popular legends associated with Jagannath is that of Kanchi Avijana (or "Conquest of Kanchi"), also termed as "Kanchi-Kaveri". According to the legends, the daughter of the King of Kanchi was betrothed to the Gajapati of Puri. When the Kanchi King witnessed the Gajapati King sweeping the area in front of where the chariots of Jagannath, Balabhadra and Subhadra were kept during Ratha yatra, he was aghast. Considering the act of sweeping unworthy of a King, the King of Kanchi declined the marriage proposal, refusing to marry his daughter to a 'Sweeper'. Gajapati Purushottama Deva, felt deeply insulted at this and attacked the Kingdom of Kanchi to avenge his honour. His attack was unsuccessful and his army defeated by the Kanchi Army.

Upon defeat, the Gajapati King Purushottama Deva returned and prayed to Jagannath, the God of land of Kalinga before planning a second campaign to Kanchi. Moved by his prayers, Jagannath and Balabhadra, left their temple in Puri and started an expedition to Kanchi on horseback. It is said that Jagannath rode on a white horse and Balabhadra on a black horse. The legend has such a powerful impact on the Odia culture that the simple mention of white horse-black horse evokes the imagery of Kanchi conquest of the God in devotees minds.

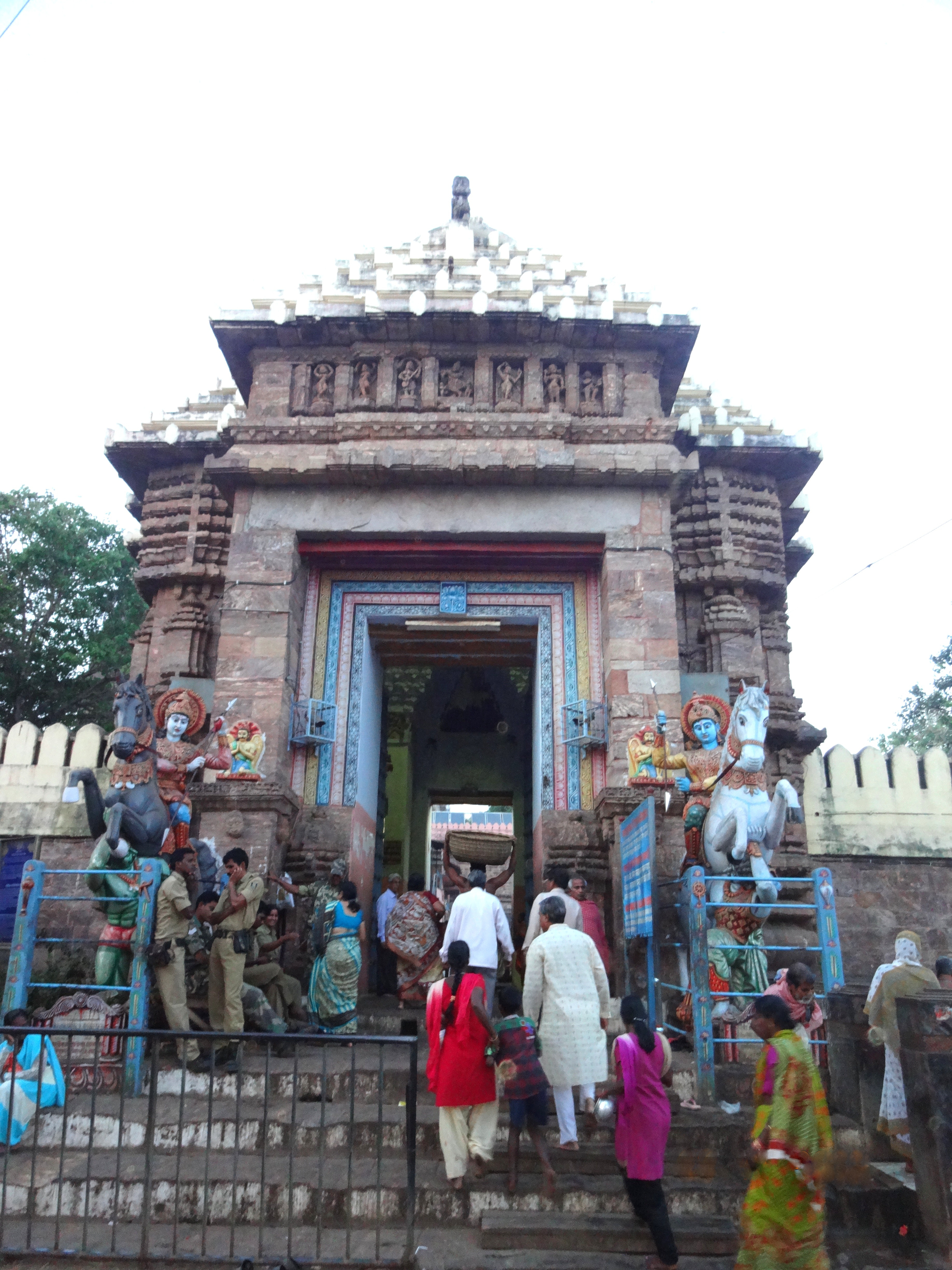
The Ashwadwara at Puri with the statue of Jagannath on a white horse and Balabhadra on a black horse

On the road, Jagannath and Balabhadra grew thirsty and met a milkmaid Manika, who gave them buttermilk (or yogurt) instead of paying her dues, Balabhadra gave her a ring telling her to claim her dues from King Purushottama. Later, King Purushottama himself passed by with his army. At Adipur near Chilika Lake, Manika stopped the king for the unpaid cost of yogurt consumed by His army's two leading soldiers riding on black and white horses. She produced the gold ring as evidence. King Purushottama Deva identified the ring as that of Jagannath. Considering this a sign of divine support for his campaign, the king enthusiastically led the expedition.

In the war between the army of Kalinga inspired by the Divine support of Jagannath and of the army of Kanchi, Purushottama Deva led his army to victory. King Purushottama brought back the Princess Padmavati of Kanchi to Puri. To avenge his humiliation, he ordered his minister to get the princess married to a sweeper. The minister waited for the annual Ratha Yatra when the King ceremonially sweeps Jagannath's chariot. He offered the princess in marriage to King Purushottama, calling the King a Royal sweeper of God. The King then married the Princess. The Gajapati King also brought back images of Uchchhishta Ganesh (Bhanda Ganesh or Kamada Ganesh) and enshrined them in the Kanchi Ganesh shrine at the Jagannath Temple in Puri.

This myth has been recounted by Mohanty. J.P. Das notes that this story is mentioned in a Madala Panji chronicle of the Jagannath Temple of Puri, in relation to Gajapati Purushottama. At any rate, the story was popular soon after Purushottama's reign, as a text of the first half of the 16th century mentions a Kanchi Avijana scene in the Jagannath temple. There is currently a prominent relief in the Jagamohana (prayer hall) of the Jagannath Temple of Puri that depicts this scene.

In modern culture, Kanchi Vijaya is a major motif in Odissi dance.

In Odia literature, the Kanchi conquest (Kanchi-Kaveri) has significant bearing, in medieval literature romanticised as the epic Kanchi-Kaveri by Purushottama Dasa in the 17th century and a work by the same name by Maguni Dasa. The first Odia drama written by Ramashankar Ray, the father of Odia drama in 1880 is Kanchi Kaveri.

The Kanchi Kingdom has been identified as the historical Vijayanagar Kingdom. As per historical records, Gajapati Purushottama Deva's expedition towards Virupaksha Raya II's Kanchi (Vijayanagar) Kingdom started during 1476 with Govinda Bhanjha as commander-in-chief. According to J. P. Das, the historicity of Kanchi conquest event is not certain.

=== Early Vaishnava traditions ===
Vaishnavism is considered a more recent tradition in Odisha, being historically traceable to the Early Middle Ages. Already, according to the Vishnudharmottara Purana (ca. 4th century), Krishna is woshipped in the form of Purushottama in Odra (Odisha).

Ramanuja, the great Vaishnav reformer, visited Puri between 1107 and 1111 converting the King Ananatavarman Chodaganga from Shaivism to Vaishnavism. At Puri he founded the Ramanuja Matha for propagating Vaishnavism in Odisha. The Alarnatha Temple stands testimony to his stay in Odisha. Since the 12th century, under the influence of Ramanuja, Jagannath culture was increasingly identified with Vaishnavism.

Under the rule of the Eastern Gangas, Vaishnavism became the predominant faith in Odisha. Odia Vaishnavism gradually centred on Jagannath as the principal deity. Sectarian differences were eliminated by assimilating deities of Shaivism, Shaktism, Tantrism, Jainism, and Buddhism in the Jagannath pantheon. The Eastern Ganga Kings respected all the ten avatars of Vishnu, considering Jagannath as the cause of all the avatars.

The Vaishnava saint Nimbarkacharya visited Puri, establishing the Radhavallabha Matha in 1268. The famous poet Jayadeva was a follower of Nimbaraka, with a focus on Radha and Krishna. Jayadev's composition Gita Govinda put a new emphasis on the concept of Radha and Krishna in east Indian Vaishnavism. And the Jagannath Temple, Puri became a place where for the first time the famous Krishnaite poem Gita Govinda was introduced into the liturgy. This idea soon became popular. Sarala Dasa in his adaptation of the Mahabharat thought of Jagannath as the universal being equating him with Buddha and Krishna. He considered Buddha-Jagannath as one of the avatars of Krishna. Sometimes Jagannath is venerated as Vamana, the sixth avatar of Vishnu.

In the 16th century, the worship of Gopala-Krishna, associated with Jagannath, had already flourished in Odisha. Thus the Raja Languliya Narasimha Deva installed the image called Gopinatha with eight figures of gopi. During Hera-Panchami festival, Jagannath is regarded as Krishna.

=== Chaitanya Mahaprabhu ===
Jagannath is widely revered in Bengal. The event of the Ratha Yatra is celebrated in West Bengal, and the day also marks the beginning of preparations for Bengal's biggest religious festival, the Durga Puja. The popularity of Jagannath among Bengalis is attributed to Chaitanya Mahaprabhu. Chaitanya Mahaprabhu emphasised bhakti and encouraged the identification of Jagannath with Krishna. He spent the last 20 years of his life in Puri dedicating it to the ecstatic worship of Jagannath, whom he considered a form of Krishna. Mahaprabhu propagated the Sankirtan movement which laid great emphasis on chanting God's name in Puri. He converted noted scholars like Sarvabhauma Bhattacharya to his philosophy. He left a great influence on the then king of Odisha, Prataprudra Deva, and the people of Odisha. According to tradition, Chaitanya Mahaprabhu is said to have merged with the idol of Jagannath in Puri after his death.

=== The ISKCON movement ===
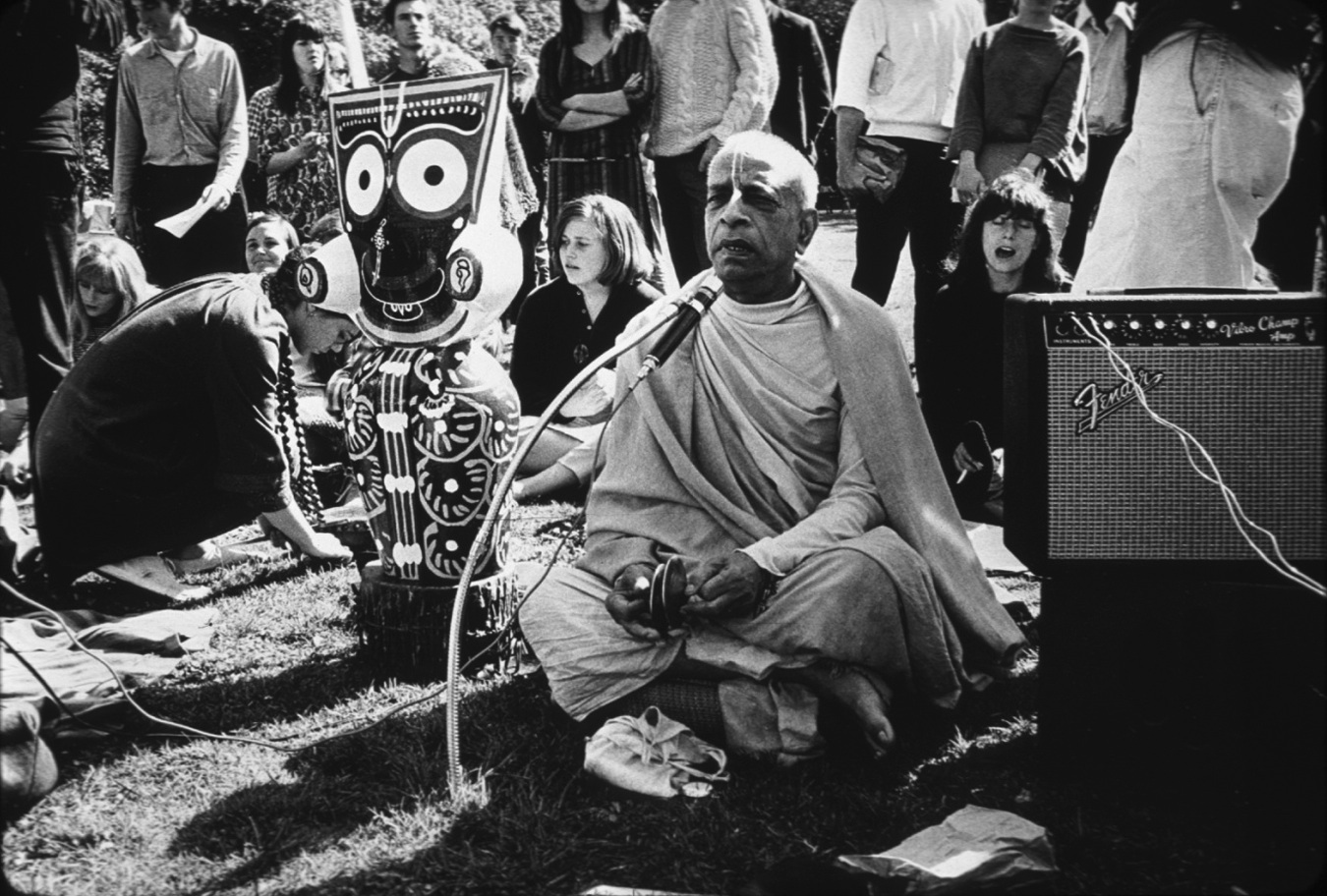
Shrila Prabhupada in Golden Gate Park with Jagannath deity to his right, February, 1967

A. C. Bhaktivedanta Swami Prabhupada, the founder of ISKCON, selected Jagannath as one of the forms of Krishna to install in ISKCON temples around the world. ISKCON has promoted Jagannath throughout the world. Annual Ratha Yatra festival is now celebrated by ISKCON in many cities in the West where they are popular attractions. ISKCON devotees worship Jagannath and take part in the Ratha Yatra in memory of Chaitanya Mahaprabhu spending 18 years in Puri worshipping Jagannath and taking an active part in the Ratha Yatra.

=== Jagannath in Shaktism ===
Jagannath is considered the combination of 5 Gods Vishnu, Shiva, Surya, Ganesh and Durga by Shaktas. When Jagannath has his divine slumber (Sayana Yatra) he is believed to assume the aspect of Durga. According to the "Niladri Mahodaya" Idol of Jagannath is placed on the Chakra Yantra, the idol of Balabhadra on the Shankha Yantra and the idol of Subhadra on the Padma Yantra.

== Jagannath and other religions ==
=== Jagannath and Buddhism ===
Among the believers of Jagannath, Jagannath is sometimes represented as the ninth avatar of Vishnu substituting Buddha. Buddha is called Jagannath in Nepalese Buddhism.

Odia poet Sarala Dasa of 15th century in his Mahabharata, describes Lord Jagannatha as a form of Buddha:

He remains in the throne inside the temple, holding the Conch and Discus in the form of Buddha. (Note: Original: ଦେଉଳ ଭିତରେ ସିଂହ୍ରାସନେ ବିଜେ ହୋଇ ବଉଦ୍ଧ ରୁପରେ ପ୍ରଭୁ ଶଙ୍ଗଚକ୍ର ବହି।)

Salute thee Shri Jagannath the revered One whose domain is the Blue Hills, he sits pretty as Shri Buddha there in the Blue Cavern. (Note: Original: ବନ୍ଦଇ ଶ୍ରୀ ଜଗନ୍ନାଥ ବଇକୁଣ୍ଠବାସୀ ବୌଦ୍ଧରୁପେ ନୀଲଗିରି ଶିଖେ ଅଛ ବସି।)

There comes Shri Jagannath as Buddha to liberate the Mankind... (Note: Original: ସଂସାରଜନ୍ମକୁ ତରିବା ନିମନ୍ତେ ବୁଦ୍ଧରୂପରେ ବିଜେ ଅଛେ ଜଗନ୍ନାଥେ।)

— Sarala Dasa (Note: At another part in Adi Parva he also says: Glory be to Rama Krsna Brahmaa as Subhadra and to the great soul Buddha ... Satyabrata Das believes this to be the wonderful integration of all faiths.)

In a Kabirpanth scripture Laxmanbodh in Kabir Sagar by Dharamdas, disciple of Kabir, Jagannath is identified as a form of Buddha.

Kali Yuga has come. I am established as Buddha. Jagannath is my name. I am established with this method. (Note: Original: अब कलियुग बैठेगा सोई। बौद्ध थापना हमरो होई॥ जगन्नाथ मम नाम है सोई। हमरी थापना यहि विधि होई॥)

In the form of Rama he killed Ravana. In the form of Krishna he defeated Kamsa. Jagannath came in the form of Buddha. And so he has lots of divine play. (Note: Original: राम रूप होय रावन मारा। कृष्ण रूप होयकंस पछारा॥ बौध रूप जगन्नाथ ओतारा। लीला बहुत भांति सम्हारा॥)

=== Jagannath and Islam ===
During the Delhi Sultanate and Mughal Empire era, Jagannath temples were one of the targets of the Muslim armies. Firuz Shah Tughlaq, for example raided Odisha and desecrated the Jagannath temple according to his court historians. Odisha was one of the last eastern regions to fall into the control of Sultanates and Mughal invasion, and they were among the earliest to declare independence and break away. According to Starza, the Jagannath images were the targets of the invaders, and a key religious symbol that the rulers would protect and hide away in forests from the aggressors. However, the Muslims were not always destructive. For example, during the rule of Akbar, the Jagannath tradition flourished. However, states Starza, "Muslim attacks on the Puri temple became serious after the death of Akbar, continued intermittently throughout the reign of Jahangir".

The local Hindu rulers evacuated and hid the images of Jagannath and other deities many times between 1509 and 1734 CE, to protect them from Muslim zeal for destruction. During Aurangzeb's time, an image was seized, shown to the emperor and then destroyed in Bijapur, but it is unclear if that image was of Jagannath. Muslim rulers did not destroy the Jagannath temple complex because it was a source of substantial treasury revenue through the collection of pilgrim tax collected from Hindus visiting it on their pilgrimage.

=== Jagannath and Sikhism ===
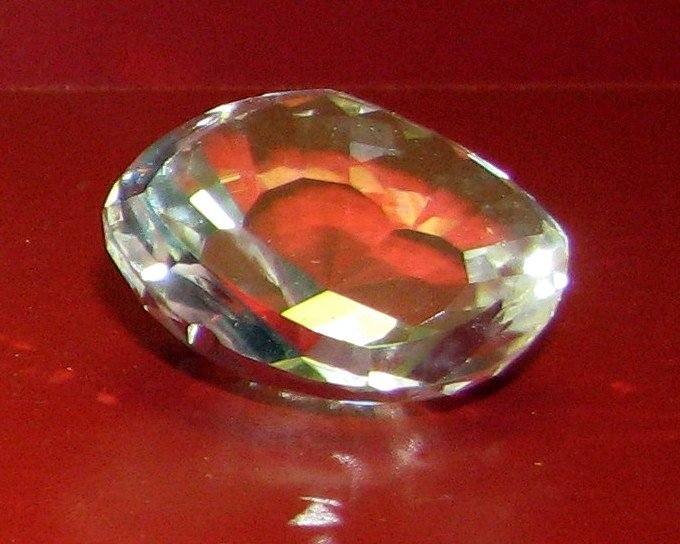
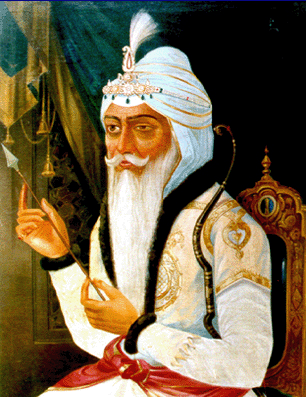
The Sikh emperor Ranjit Singh, claimed by some to have revered Jagannath. He allegedly bequeathed the Koh-i-noor diamond (left) to the Jagannath temple in Puri.

In 1506 or 1508 Guru Nanak, the founder of Sikhism, made a pilgrimage to Puri to visit to Jagannath during his journey (called Udasi) to east India. The Sikh Aarti Gagan mai thaal was recited by him at the revered Jagannath Temple, Puri. This arti is sung (not performed with platter and lamps etc.) daily after recitation of Rehraas Sahib & Ardās at the Harmandir Sahib, Amritsar and at most Gurdwara sahibs.

Later Sikh gurus like Guru Teg Bahadur also visited Jagannath Puri. It is said that Maharaja Ranjit Singh the famous 19th-century Sikh ruler of Punjab held great respect in Jagannath, and allegedly willed his most prized possession, the Koh-i-Noor (believed to be Syamantaka) diamond, to Jagannath in Puri, while on his deathbed in 1839.

=== Jagannath and Christianity ===
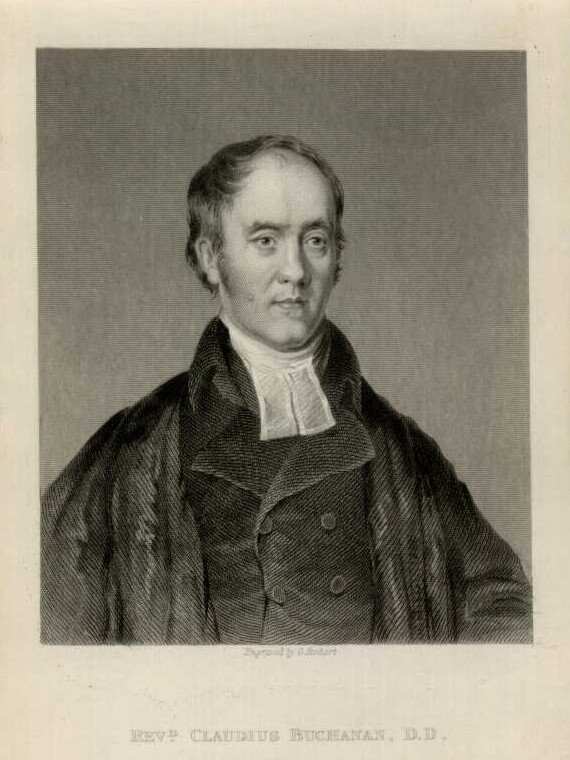
Claudius Buchanan's writings on "Juggernaut" were the first introduction of Indian religions to the American audience, and one that originated and constructed intercultural misunderstanding.

For Christian missionaries who arrived through the ports of eastern states of India such as Calcutta in the 18th- and 19th-centuries, Jagannath was the "core of idolatry" and the target of "an all-out attack". Jagannath, called Juggernaut by the Christian missionary Claudius Buchanan, was through Buchanan's letters the initial introduction in America of Hinduism, which he spelled as "Hindoo". According to Michael J. Altman, a professor of Religious Studies, Buchanan presented Hinduism to the American audience, through Juggernaut, as a "bloody, violent, superstitious and backward religious system" that needs to be eliminated and substituted with the Christian gospel. He described Juggernaut with Biblical terminology for his audience, called him the Moloch, and his shrine as Golgatha – the place where Jesus Christ was crucified, but with the difference that the "Juggernaut tradition" was of endless meaningless bloodshed, fabricating allegations that children were sacrificed in the "valley of idolatrous blood shed to false gods". In his letters, states Altman, Buchanan "constructed an image of Juggernaut as the diametric opposite of Christianity".

These views are picked up in Letitia Elizabeth Landon's posthumous poetical illustration to The Temple of Juggernaut, a picture by Alfred Gomersal Vickers. However, she counters them not so much with hostility, as with the Christian doctrine of 'Faith, Hope, and Love'.

In his book Christian Researches in Asia, published in 1811, Buchanan built on this theme and added licentiousness to it. He called hymns in language he did not know nor could read as "obscene stanzas", art works on temple walls as "indecent emblems", and described "Juggernaut" and Hinduism to his American readers as the religion of disgusting Moloch and false gods. Buchanan writings formed the "first images of Indian religions" to the American evangelical audience in early 19th-century, was promoted by American magazines such as The Panoplist and his book on "Juggernaut" attracted enough reader demand that it was republished in numerous editions. Buchanan's writings on "Juggernaut" influenced the American imagination of Indian religions for another 50 years, formed the initial impressions and served as a template for reports by other missionaries who followed Buchanan in India for most of the 19th century. According to William Gribbin and other scholars, Buchanan's Juggernaut metaphor is a troublesome example of intercultural misunderstanding and constructed identity. Ujaan Ghosh, however, argues that these misrepresentations of "Juggernaut" and the deity's demonization were not homogeneous throughout the nineteenth century. Gradually global perception of the deity was more humanized. Several European authors, such as William Wilson Hunter and James Fergusson went to great lengths to revise Buchanan's perception and presented a more humane version of Jagannath to British and American audience.

Due to persistent attacks from non-Indic religions, even to this day, devotees of only Dharmic religions are allowed entry in the Jagannath Puri temple.

== Influence ==
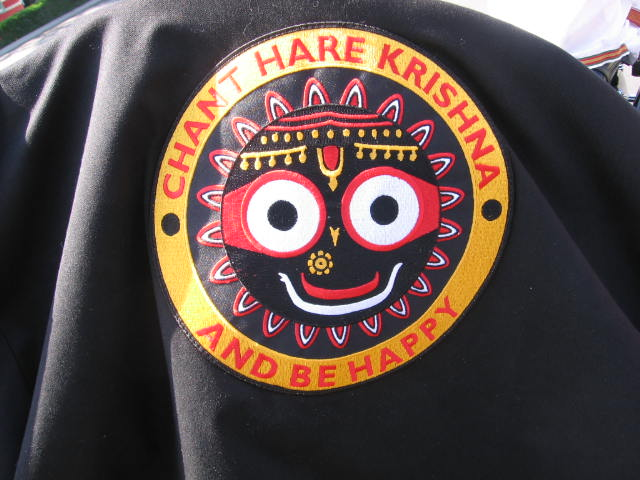
The Jagannath symbol is a part of the Krishna iconography in ISKCON events around the world.

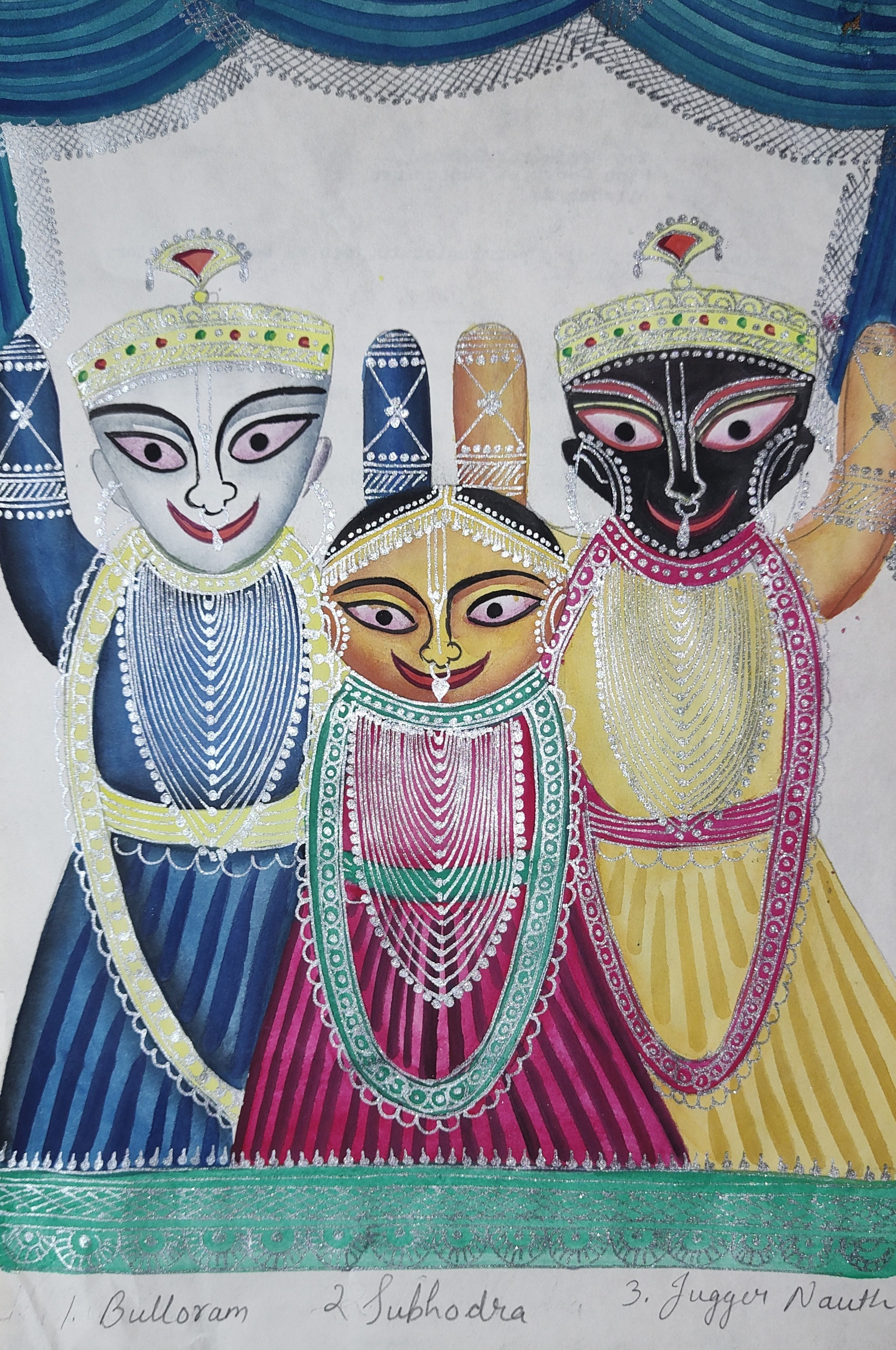
Jagannath, Subhadra and Balabhadra in the ghat painting

The English traveller William Burton visited the Jagannath temple. According to Avinash Patra, Burton made absurd observations in 1633 that are inconsistent with all historical and contemporary records, such as the image of Jagannatha being "a serpent, with seven heads". Burton described it as "the mirror of all wickedness and idolatry" to the Europeans, an introduction of Hinduism as "monstrous paganism" to early travellers to the Indian subcontinent. Jean-Baptiste Tavernier never saw the Puri temple icon and its decorations, but described the jewelry worn by the idol from hearsay accounts. François Bernier mentioned the Puri chariot festival, in his 1667 memoir, but did not describe the icon of Jagannath raising the question whether he was able to see it.

According to Kanungo, states Goldie Osuri, the Jagannath tradition has been a means of legitimizing royalty. Anantavarman Chodaganga, a benevolent ruler of the Kalinga region (now Odisha and nearby regions), built the extant Puri temple. Kanungo states that this endeavor was an attempt by him to establish his agency, and he extrapolates this practice into late medieval and modern era developments. According to him, Muslim rulers attempted to control it for the same motivation, thereafter the Marathas, then East India Company and then the British crown over the colonial era sought to legitimize its influence and hegemonic control in the region by appropriating control over the Jagannath temple and affiliating themselves with the deities.

Jagannath became an influential figure and icon for power and politics during the 19th-century colonialism and Christian missionary activity, states Osuri. The British government initially took over the control and management of major Jagannath temples, to collect fees and Pilgrim Tax from Hindu who arrived from all over the Indian subcontinent to visit. (Note: Claudius Buchanan mentions the Pilgrim Tax was collected from Hindus after they had walked very long distances, for many weeks, to visit the Puri temple. Anyone refusing to pay would be denied entry to the city.) (Note: The pilgrim tax was not a British invention, and was a religious tax on Hindus introduced by the Muslim rulers during the Mughal era.) In contrast, Christian missionaries strongly opposed the British government association with Jagannath temple because it's connected the government with idolatry, or the "worship of false god". Between 1856 and 1863, the British government accepted the missionary demand and handed over the Jagannath temples to the Hindus. According to Cassels and Mukherjee, the British rule documents suggest that the handing over was more motivated by the growing Hindu agitation against the Pilgrim Tax that they considered as discriminatory targeting based on religion, and rising corruption among the British officials and their Indian assistants, in the handling of collected tax.

To colonial era Hindu nationalists in the late 19th-century and 20th-century, Jagannath became a unifying symbol which combined their religion, social and cultural heritage into a political cause of self-rule and freedom movement.

== Festivals ==
A large number of traditional festivals are observed by the devotees of Jagannath. Out of those numerous festivals, thirteen are important.

1. Niladri Mahodaya
2. Snana Yatra
3. Ratha Yatra or Shri Gundicha Yatra
4. Shri Hari Sayana
5. Utthapana Yatra
6. Parswa Paribartana
7. Dakhyinayana Yatra
8. Prarabana Yatra
9. Pusyabhisheka
10. Uttarayana
11. Dola Jatra
12. Damanaka Chaturdasi
13. Chandan Yatra

Ratha Yatra is most significant of all festivals of Jagannath.

=== Ratha Yatra ===
The Jagannath triad are usually worshipped in the sanctum of the temple, but once during the month of Ashadha (rainy season of Odisha, usually falling on the month of June or July), they are brought out onto the Bada Danda (Puri's main high street) and travel 3 km to the Shri Gundicha Temple, in huge chariots, allowing the public to have Darshana (i.e., holy view). This festival is known as Ratha Yatra, meaning the festival (yatra) of the chariots (ratha). The rathas are huge wheeled wooden structures, which are built anew every year and are pulled by the devotees. The chariot for Jagannath is approximately 14 metres (45 ft) high and 3.3 square metres (35 sq ft) and takes about 2 months to construct. The artists and painters of Puri decorate the cars and paint flower petals etc. on the wheels, the wood-carved charioteer and horses, and the inverted lotuses on the wall behind the throne. The huge chariot of Jagannath pulled during Ratha Yatra is the etymological origin of the English word juggernaut. The Ratha Yatra is also termed as the Shri Gundicha Yatra.

The most significant ritual associated with the Ratha Yatra is the chhera pahara. During the festival, the Gajapati king wears the outfit of a sweeper and sweeps all around the deities and chariots in the Chhera Pahara (Sweeping with water) ritual. The Gajapati king cleanses the road before the chariots with a gold-handled broom and sprinkles sandalwood water and powder with utmost devotion. As per the custom, although the Gajapati king has been considered the most exalted person in the Kalingan kingdom, still he renders the menial service to Jagannath. This ritual signified that under the lordship of Jagannath, there is no distinction between the powerful sovereign, the Gajapati king, and the most humble devotee.

Chhera pahara is held on two days, on the first day of the Ratha Yatra, when the deities are taken to the garden house at Mausi Maa Temple and again on the last day of the festival, when the deities are ceremoniously brought back to the Shri Mandir.

As per another ritual, when the deities are taken out from the Shri Mandir to the chariots in Pahandi Vijay, disgruntled devotees hold a right to offer kicks, slaps and make derogatory remarks to the images, and Jagannath behaves like a commoner.

In the Ratha Yatra, the three deities are taken from the Jagannath Temple in the chariots to the Gundicha Temple, where they stay for seven days. Thereafter, the deities again ride the chariots back to Shri Mandir in Bahuda Yatra. On the way back, the three chariots stop at the Mausi Maa Temple and the deities are offered poda pitha, a kind of baked cake which are generally consumed by the poor sections only.

The observance of the Ratha Yatra of Jagannath dates back to the period of the Puranas. Vivid descriptions of this festival are found in Brahma Purana, Padma Purana and Skanda Purana. Kapila Purana also refers to Ratha Yatra. During the Mughal period, Maharaja Ram Singh II of Jaipur, Rajasthan, has also been described as organising the Ratha Yatra in the 18th century. In Odisha, kings of Mayurbhanj and Paralakhemundi also organized the Ratha Yatra, though the most grand festival in terms of scale and popularity takes place at Puri.

In fact, Starza notes that the ruling Eastern Ganga dynasty instituted the Ratha Yatra at the completion of the great temple around 1150. This festival was one of those Hindu festivals that was reported to the Western world very early. Friar Odoric of Pordenone visited India in 1316–1318, some 20 years after Marco Polo had dictated the account of his travels while in a Genovese prison. In his own account of 1321, Odoric reported how the people put the "idols" on chariots, and the king and queen and all the people drew them from the "church" with song and music.

== Temples ==
Besides the only temple described below, there are many temples in India, three more in Bangladesh and one in Nepal.

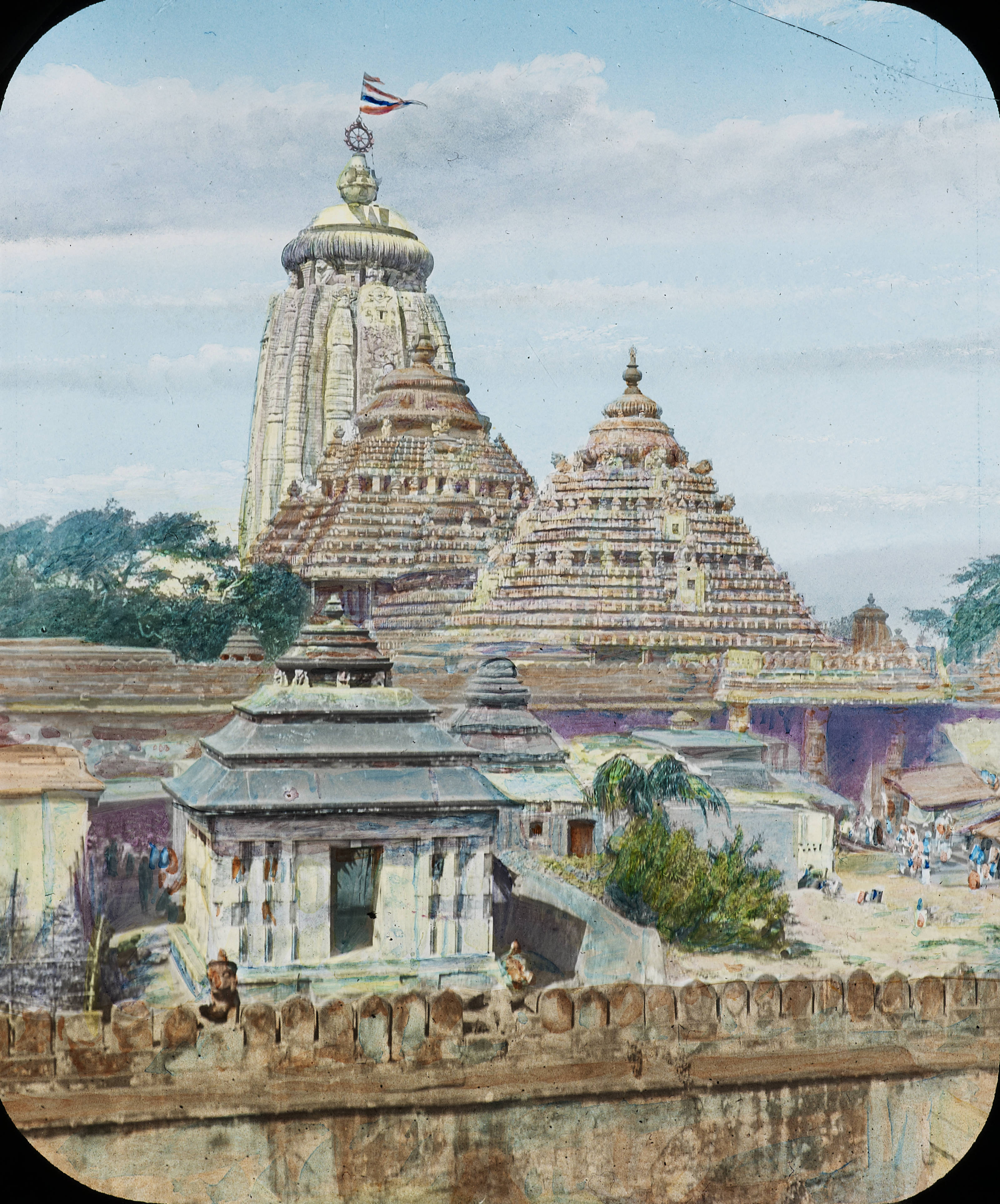
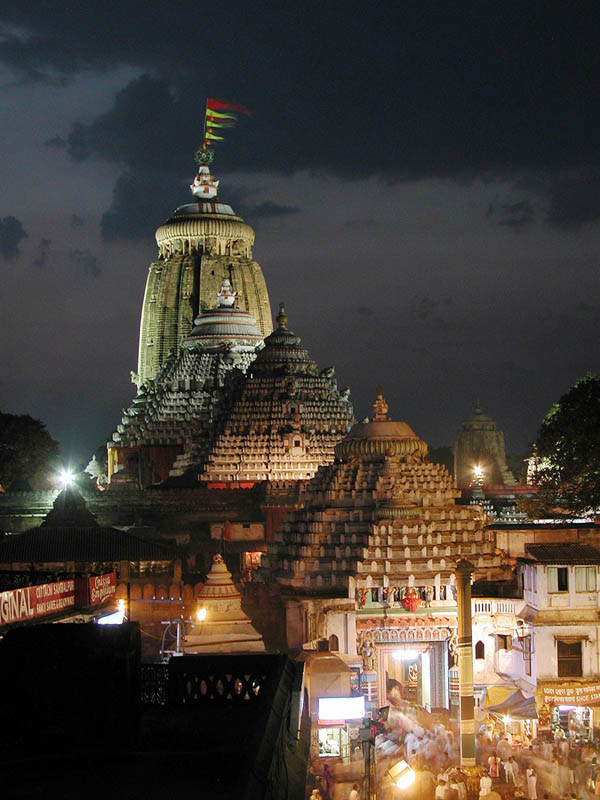
The Jagannath temple in Puri, Odisha. It is a major historic Hindu pilgrimage site. Left: An artist's sketch in 1915.

The Temple of Jagannath at Puri is one of the major Hindu temples in India. The temple is built in the Kalinga style of architecture, with the Pancharatha (five chariots) type consisting of two anurathas, two konakas and one ratha. Jagannath temple is a pancharatha with well-developed pagas. 'Gajasimhas' (elephant lions) carved in recesses of the pagas, the 'Jhampasimhas' (Jumping lions) are also placed properly. The perfect pancharatha temple developed into a Nagararekha temple with unique Odia style of subdivisions like the Pada, Kumbha, Pata, Kani and Vasanta. The Vimana or the apsidal structure consists of several sections superimposed one over other, tapering to the top where the Amalakashila and Kalasa are placed.

Temple of Jagannath at Puri has four distinct sectional structures, namely -

1. Deula or Vimana (Sanctum sanctorum) where the triad deities are lodged on the Ratnavedi (Throne of Pearls);
2. Mukhashala (Frontal porch);
3. Nata mandir/Natyamandapa, which is also known as the Jagamohana, (Audience Hall/Dancing Hall), and
4. Bhogamandapa (Offerings Hall).

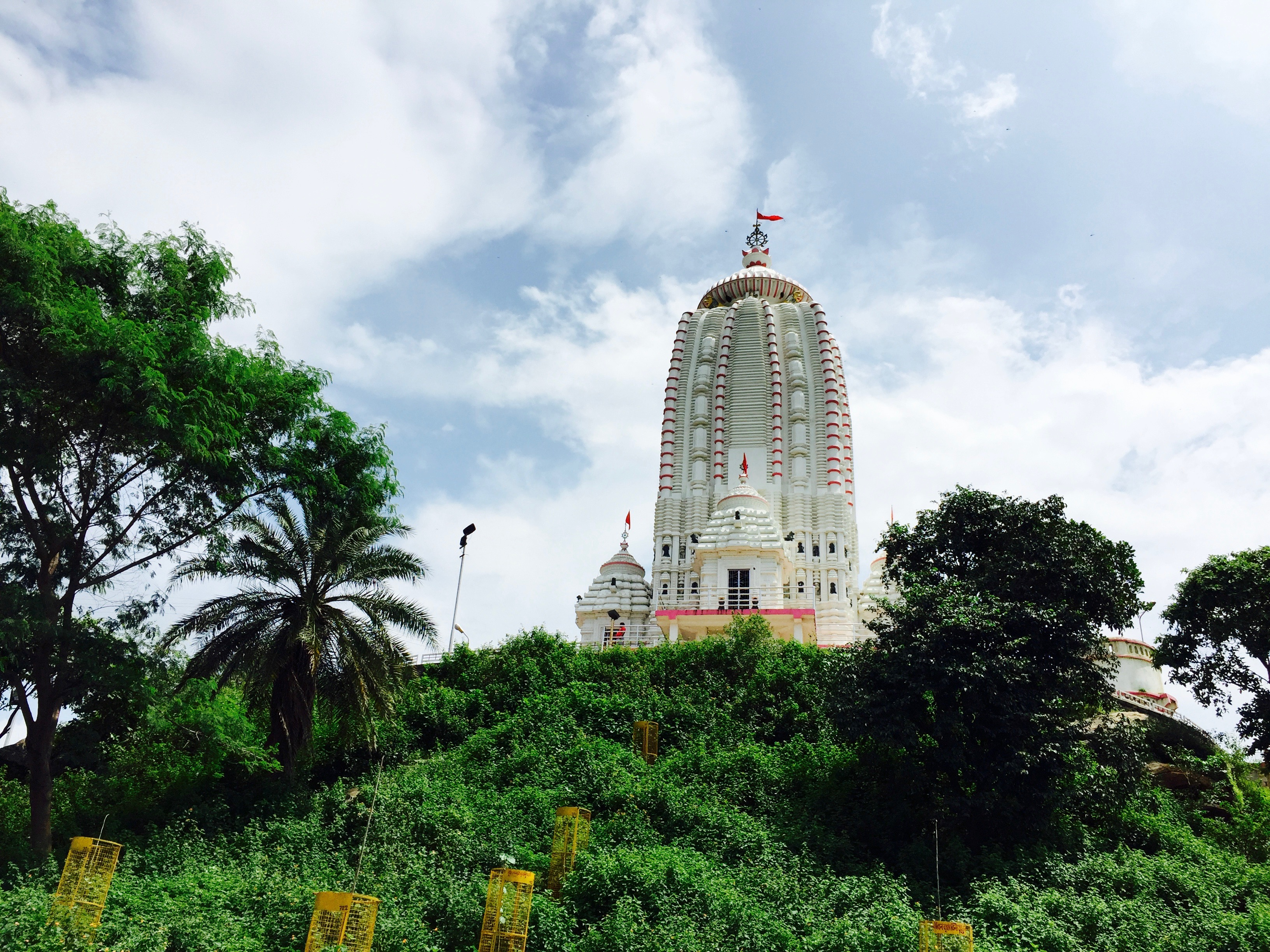
The Jagganath Temple in Ranchi, Jharkhand

The temple is built on an elevated platform, as compared to Lingaraja temple and other temples belonging to this type. This is the first temple in the history of Kalingan temple architecture where all the chambers like Jagamohana, Bhogamandapa and Natyamandapa were built along with the main temple. There are miniature shrines on the three outer sides of the main temple.

The Deula consists of a tall shikhara (dome) housing the sanctum sanctorum (garbhagriha). A pillar made of fossilized wood is used for placing lamps as offering. The Lion Gate (Singhadwara) is the main gate to the temple, guarded by two guardian deities Jaya and Vijaya. A 16-sided, 11-metre-high (36 ft) granite monolithic columnar pillar known as the Aruna Stambha (Solar Pillar) bearing Aruna, the charioteer of Surya, faces the Lion Gate. This column was brought here from the Sun Temple of Konark.

There is a temple situated in Mahesh, Serampore in West Bengal, which is famous for Ratha Yatra of Mahesh.

The temple's historical records Madala Panji maintains that the temple was originally built by King Yayati of the Somavamshi dynasty on the site of the present shrine. However, the historians question the veracity and historicity of the Madala Panji. As per historians, the Deula and the Mukhashala were built in the 12th century by Eastern Ganga King Anangabhima Deva III, the grandson of Anantavarman Chodaganga and the Natyamandapa and Bhogamandapa were constructed subsequently during the reign of Gajapati Purushottama Deva (1462–1491) and Prataparudra Deva (1495–1532) respectively. According to Madala Panji, the outer prakara was built by Gajapati Kapilendra Deva (1435–1497). The inner prakara called the Kurma bedha (Tortoise encompassment) was built by Purushottama Deva.

== See also ==
- Hindu deities
- Hundun
- Ideogram
- Lingam
- 'Oro
- Ratha Yatra
- Sevayat
