= Mausi Maa Temple =

Temple in Puri, India

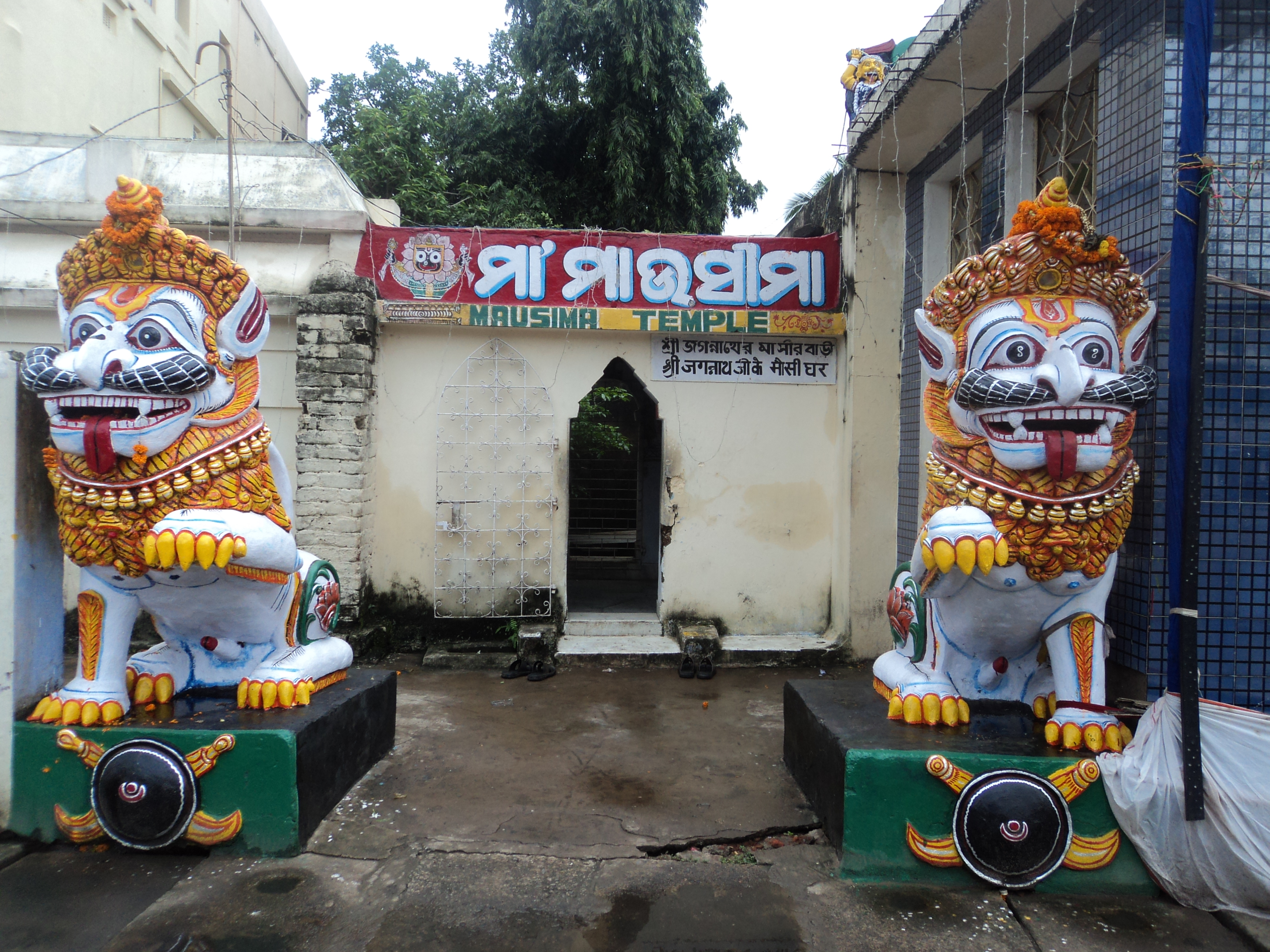
Mausi Maa temple

The Mausi Maa temple is situated at the mid-way of the Bada danda (Grand road) of Puri. It is a small temple dedicated to Goddess Ardhashini.

As per Jagannath mythology, once Goddess Lakshmi Devi left Shri Mandira, and thus Jagannath and Balabhadra become poor and had to go out for begging. When Jagannath and Balabhadra were out during that time, Subhadra Devi was staying with Mausi Maa (Maternal Aunt).

Mausi Maa is also termed as Ardhashosini. It has been mentioned in the Vaisanava Kanda of the Skanda Purana that Goddess Ardhashosini drank half of the sea water that flooded Puri and saved the abode of Shri Jagannath. Goddess Ardhashosini with Kapalamochana Shiva, act as the guardians of the Shree Kshetra.

During the return journey (Bahuda yatra) of Ratha yatra festival, the chariot of Shri Jagannath stops at Mausi Maa temple and the deity is offered with their favourite Poda Pitha, a kind of baked cake made in lentils and rice.
