= Patalesvara Siva Temple – III =

Pataleswar Siva Temple – III
- Location in Orissa

Religion
- Affiliation: Hinduism
- Deity: Shiva

Location
- Location: Bhubaneswar
- State: Orissa
- Country: India
- Interactive map of Pataleswar Siva Temple – III
- Coordinates: 20°14′26″N 85°50′05″E

Architecture
- Type: Kalingan
- Completed: 13th century A.D.
- Elevation: 21 m (69 ft)

Patalesvara Siva Temple – III (Hindi: पातालेश्वर शिव) is a Siva temple located on the Mandir Chowk of Old Town, Bhubaneswar, Orissa, India. The temple dates to the 13th century AD.

== Location ==
Patalesvara Siva Temple – III is situated on the left side of the Lingaraja temple eastern gateway and it is situated on the Mandir Chowk of Old Town area in Bhubaneswar. The temple is facing towards east and the presiding deity is a circular yonipitha with a Siva-lingam. The temple is made of sandstone. The sanctum is 2.59 m below the present road level which is provided with seventeen steps leading down the sanctum.

== Ownership ==
Single/Multiple: Multiple Public/Private: Public

== Property Type ==
Precinct/ Building/ Structure/Landscape/Site/Tank: Building

Subtype: Temple

Typology: Pidha Deul

== Physical Description ==
=== Surrounding ===
The temple is surrounded by road in east, compound wall of Lingaraja temple on its west at a distance of 1.85 m, and Mahakala and Mahakali temple on its southern side through the eastern gateway of Lingaraja temple at a distance of 55 m.

=== Physical Description ===
On plan, the temple has a vimana and a frontal porch measuring 3.50 m^{2}. On elevation, the temple is buried up to the bada. Only the gandi is visible that measures 3.00 m in height and mastaka is 0.70 m
Raha niche & parsva devatas: Since the temple is buried up to the bada the raha niches are buried.
v) Decorative features:
The doorjambs are decorated with three vertical bands that measure 1.55 m in height x 0.74 m in width. At the base of the doorjamb, there are two dvarapala niches measuring 0.36 m in height, 0.17 m in width, the enshrining deities of these niches are Saivite Dvarapala holding a trident in left hand and the right hand is in varada mudra
Lintel: At the lalatabimba, there is a Gajalaxmi image seated in lalitasana over a lotus, The image is flanked by elephants, who are pouring water upon the deity.

== Grade ==
Architecture	C
Historic	C
Associational	C
Social/cultural	C
