= Patalesvara Siva Temple – II =

Pataleswar Siva Temple – II
- Location in Orissa

Religion
- Affiliation: Hinduism
- Deity: Shiva

Location
- Location: Bhubaneswar
- State: Orissa
- Country: India
- Interactive map of Pataleswar Siva Temple – II
- Coordinates: 20°14′41″N 85°50′06″E

Architecture
- Completed: 10th/11th century
- Elevation: 21 m (69 ft)

Patalesvara Siva Temple – II is a Shiva temple located in Bhubaneswar, Orissa, India. This temple dates back to the 10th/11th century and is partly buried and broken.

== Location ==
Patalesvara Siva temple is located on the right side of the Talabazar road leading from Kedara-Gouri temple to Lingaraja temple. The geographical coordinates are Lat. 20°14’41" N., Long. 85° 50’ 06"E., The temple is at an elevation of 75 feet.

== Ownership ==
Single/Multiple: Multiple
Public/Private: Public

== Property Type ==
Precinct/Building/Structure/Landscape/Site/Tank: Building
Subtype: Temple
Typology:Rekha Deul

== Physical Description ==
=== Surroundings ===
The temple is surrounded by Ananta Basudeva temple in the east across the road, Bindusagar tank in west.

=== Architectural features ===
The temple is buried up to half of the jangha. The temple has bada, gandi and mastaka. The bada of the temple above the present surface measures 2.50 metres, gandi measures 3 m and mastaka measures 1 m in height. The building material is sandstone and construction technique is dry masonry. The style is predominantly Kalingam.

== Grade ==
Architecture	B
Historic	C
Associational	C
Social/Cultural	C

== Threats to property ==
=== Conservation Problem and Remedies ===
Besides the rain water percolating from the roof, the rain water from the road also enters into the sanctum, which is creating great problems on account of the temple's proximity to Bindusagara and low elevation of the sanctum. As a result, the deity remains submerged throughout the year.

=== Detached and loose sculptures ===
There is an Udyota Simha on the left side of the doorjamb.
