= Patalesvara Siva Temple – I =

Pataleswar Siva Temple – I
- Location in Orissa

Religion
- Affiliation: Hinduism

Location
- Location: Bhubaneswar
- State: Orissa
- Country: India
- Interactive map of Pataleswar Siva Temple – I
- Coordinates: 20°14′48″N 85°51′28″E

Architecture
- Completed: 13th century A.D.
- Elevation: 21 m (69 ft)

Patalesvara Siva Temple – I is a temple dedicated to Lord Shiva, located in Old Town, Bhubaneswar, Odisha, India. This temple dates back to 13th century, and belongs to the Ganga era. At present, this temple is situated inside the compound wall of a private residence.

== Location ==
The geographical location of the temple is Lat-20° 14'48" N, Long 85°51'28" E. The elevation is 70 ft. Patalesvarasiva temp-I is situated on the left side of the Kedara-Gouri road (leading from Parsuramesvara temple to Bindusagar) at a distance of 200 m west of Parsuramesvara and 50.00 m north-west of Champakesvara temple in Old Town, Bhubaneswar.

== Property type ==
The property type (Precinct/ Building/ Structure/Landscape/Site/Tank)is Building and the Subtype is Temple. The typology of the temple is Rekha Deul. The temple is presently in use.

== Physical description ==
=== Surroundings ===
At present the temple situated inside the compound of a Bengali family, surrounded by residential buildings on three sides and the branching road on the north.

=== Architectural features ===
The temple is buried up to half of the rahaniche. On plan, temple is pancharatha with a square vimana extending towards a frontal porch. The temple is of rekha order with components like bada, gandi and mastaka that measures 10.7 m in height. On elevation, the bada measuring 3.600 m has fivefold divisions namely pabhaga (1.00m) buried, talajangha (0.73 m), bandhana of single moulding (0.17 m),upara jangha (0.72 m) and baranda of three mouldings (0.98 m). The gandi above the baranda measuring 6.10 m in height is curvilinear and pancharatha as distinguished by a central raha and a pairs of anuratha and kanika pagas on either side of the raha. Because of the cement plaster the walls are plain except udyota simha on the eastern wall. The mastaka as usual on Orissan temples has components like beki, amlaka, khapuri and kalasa. v) Raha niche & parsva devatas: The raha niches on three sides uniformly measure 0.80 m in height, 0.52 m in width and 0.30 m in depth are partly buried, devoid of ornamentation and empty of parsvadevatas. v) Decorative features: — Doorjambs: The doorjambs measuring 2.10 m in height and 1.50 m in width are decorated with three vertical bands of puspa sakha, lata sakha and patra sakha from exterior to interior. At the lalatabimba there is a Gajalaxmi seated over a lotus pedestal and flanked by two elephants standing on full blown lotus on either side. On the base of the doorjambs there are dvarapala niches enshrining Saivite dvarapalas holding trident in their left hands. Lintel: Above the doorjambs is a graha architrave that measures 1.80 m in length and is carved with the traditional navagrahas flanked by two atlantid ganas. The grahas are housed in small pidha niches, seated in padmasana. Rahu is depicted with shoulder rather than a head with hands and Ketu has serpent tail and turned hands. There is an image of Nataraj housed in a niche in the gandi, which is a later insertion. The building material is grey Sandstone and laterite.

== Grade ==
Architecture	C
Historic	C
Associational	C
Social/Cultural	C
