= List of Hindu temples in Rayagada district =

Coordinates: 19.168577°N 83.413181°E

The following is a list of Hindu temples in Rayagada district, Odisha, India.

== List ==
1. Balaji Temple, Gunupur
2. Balunkeswar Temple, Rayagada
3. Chatikona Shiva temple
4. Gayatri Temple at MITS College, Rayagada
5. Hanuman Temple near daily market, Rayagada
6. Jagannath Temple, Rayagada
7. Laxminarayan temple, Therubali
8. Lord Venketeshwar Temple, Rayagada
9. Maa Majhighariani Termple, Rayagada
10. Maa Mangala Temple, Rayagada
11. Maa Santoshi Temple near daily market, Rayagada
12. Maa Markama Temple at Bissamcuttack
13. Maa kali Temple, Rayagada
14. Mutyalamma Temple, Rayagada
15. Paikapada Shiva temple
16. Rama Temple, Gunupur
17. Radhakrushna Temple in MITS Campus
18. Radhakrushna Temple of Brahmin street, Rayagada
19. Swamy Ayappa Temple at Bypass Road, Gunupur
20. Shiridi Sai Temple at Railway Colony, Rayagada
21. Sri Rama Temple, Rayagada
22. Sri Vinayaka Temple, Rayagada
23. Swamy Ayyappa Temple, Rayagada
24. Hanumana Temple at Church Road, Gunupur
25. Jagannath Temple, Gunupur
26. Radhakrushna Temple at Gunupur
27. Neelamani Durga Temple, Gunupur
28. Dakhina Kali Temple at Gunupur
29. Shiva Temple(Baghua Deula), Gunupur
30. Bhimshankar Jyotirlinga Temple at Bhimpur
31. Shiridi Sai Temple, Gunupur
32. Satya Sai Temple, Gunupur
33. Maa Manikeshwari Temple, Gunupur
34. Maa Mangala Temple at Gunupur
35. Sri Rama Temple, Rayagada
36. Sri Vasavi Kanyaka Parameswari Temple, Rayagada
37. Shiva Temple at Jyotimahal Chouk, Rayagada
38. Santoshi Maa Temple, Rayagada
39. Satabhauni Temple at Rayagada
40. Trinath Temple, Rayagada
41. Gayatri Temple at Rayagada
42. Nilakantheswar temple, Padmapur
43. Maa Manikeswari Temple, Kashipur
44. Kanyaka Parameswari Temple, Gunupur
45. Lord Ganesh Temple, Gunupure
46. Sri Mrutyunjaya & Meenakshi Temple, Gunupur
47. Shiva Temple, Gunupur
48. Jagannath Temple of Durgi-odisha
49. Shiv Temple of Rayat Colony, Rayagada
50. Radha Krishna Temple, Durgi
51. Radha Krushan Temple, Lihuri, Gunupur (The temple is situated in Andhra Pradesh, but in the Border of Rayagada district)
52. Maa Banadurga Temple, Rayagada
53. Trinath Temple, Padmapur
54. Satya Narayana Swami Temple, Rayagada
55. Giri Gobardhan Temple, Rayagada
56. Lord Venketeswar Temple, Rayagada
57. Lord Rama Temple, Rayagada(near Kasturi Nagara)
58. Shiva Temple, Rayagada(Kasturi Nagara)
59. Omkarnath Temple, Chekaguda(Rayagada)
60. Sankeswari Temple, Sankesh, Rayagada
61. Shiv Temple at Rohita Colony, Rayagada
62. Maa Bhadra Kali Temple, Rayagada
63. Satsang Vihar, Rayagada
64. Radhakrishna Temple at Bhaleri near Gunupur
65. Lord Hanuman Temple at Kailashpur(Rayagada)

== Gallery ==
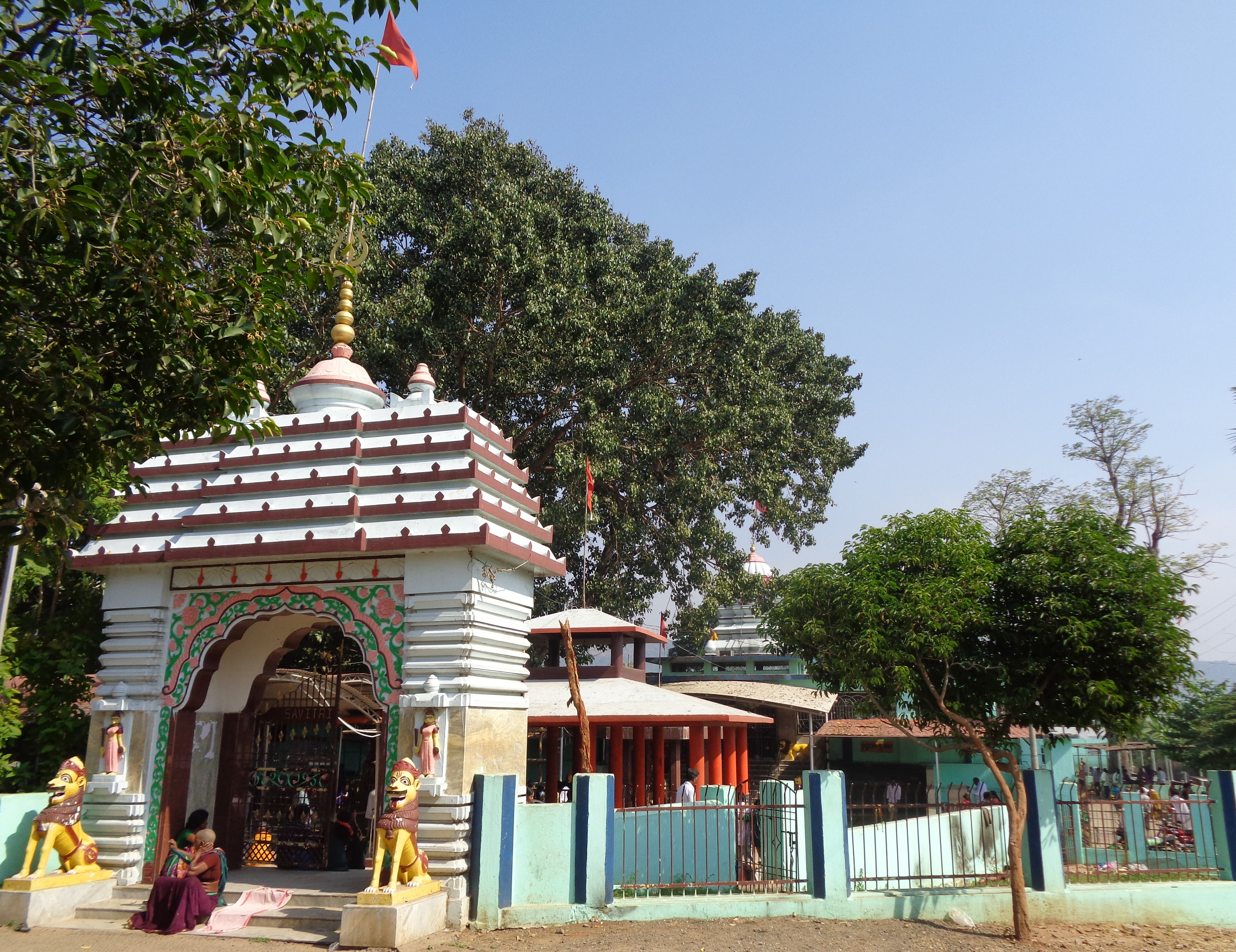
Maa Majhighariani Temple, Rayagada

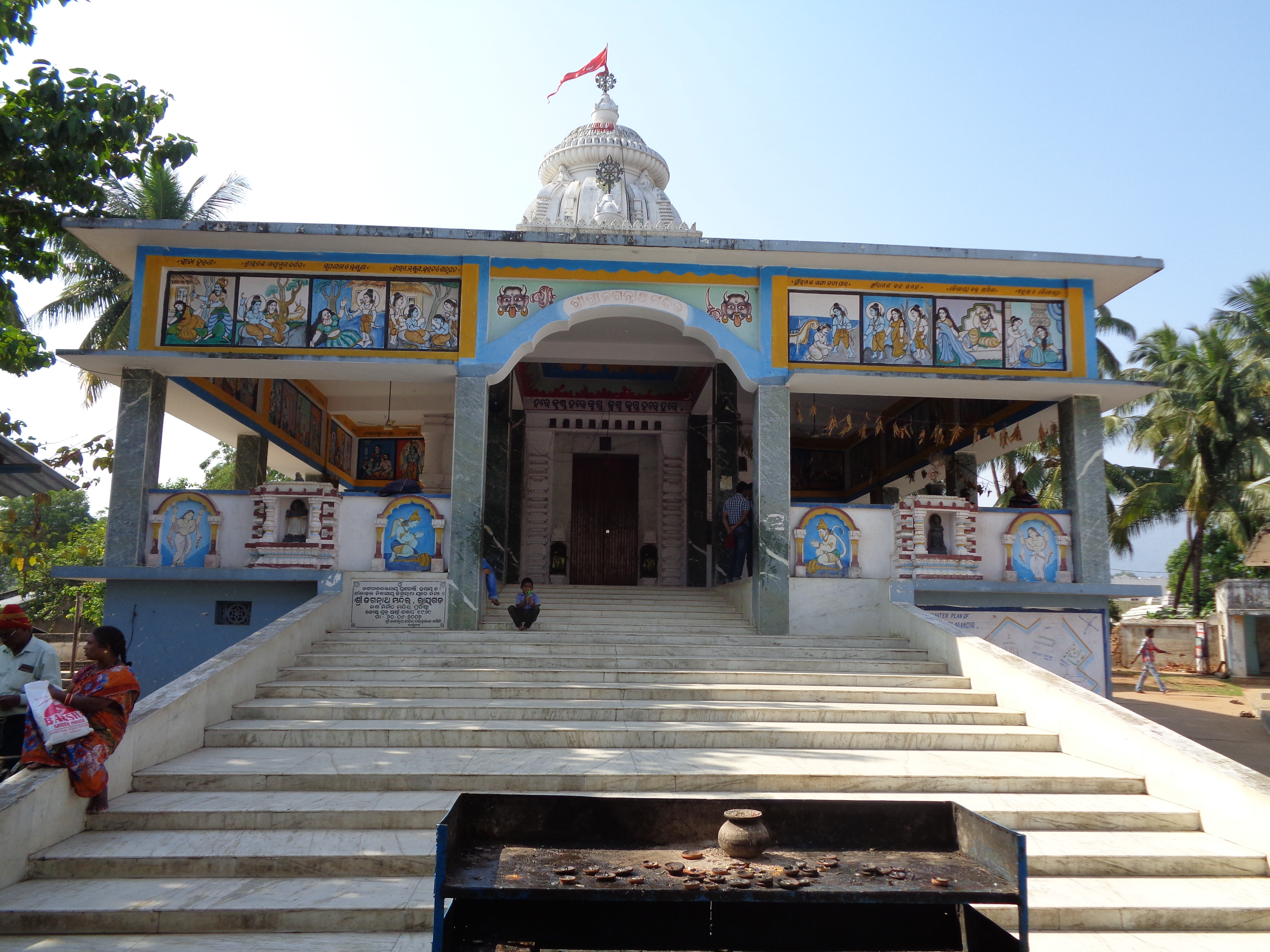
Jagannath temple, Rayagada

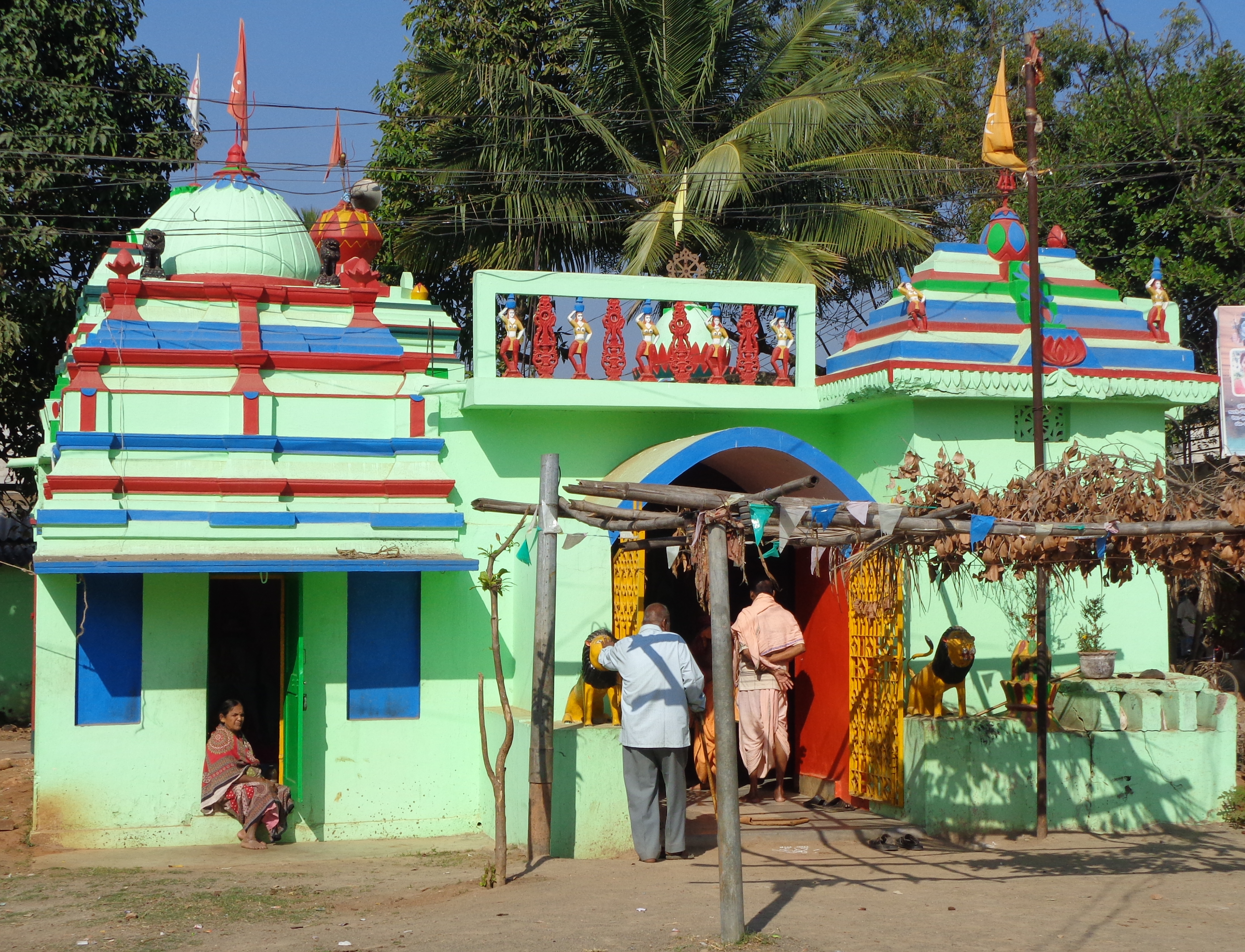
Maa Mangala Maa Temple, Rayagada

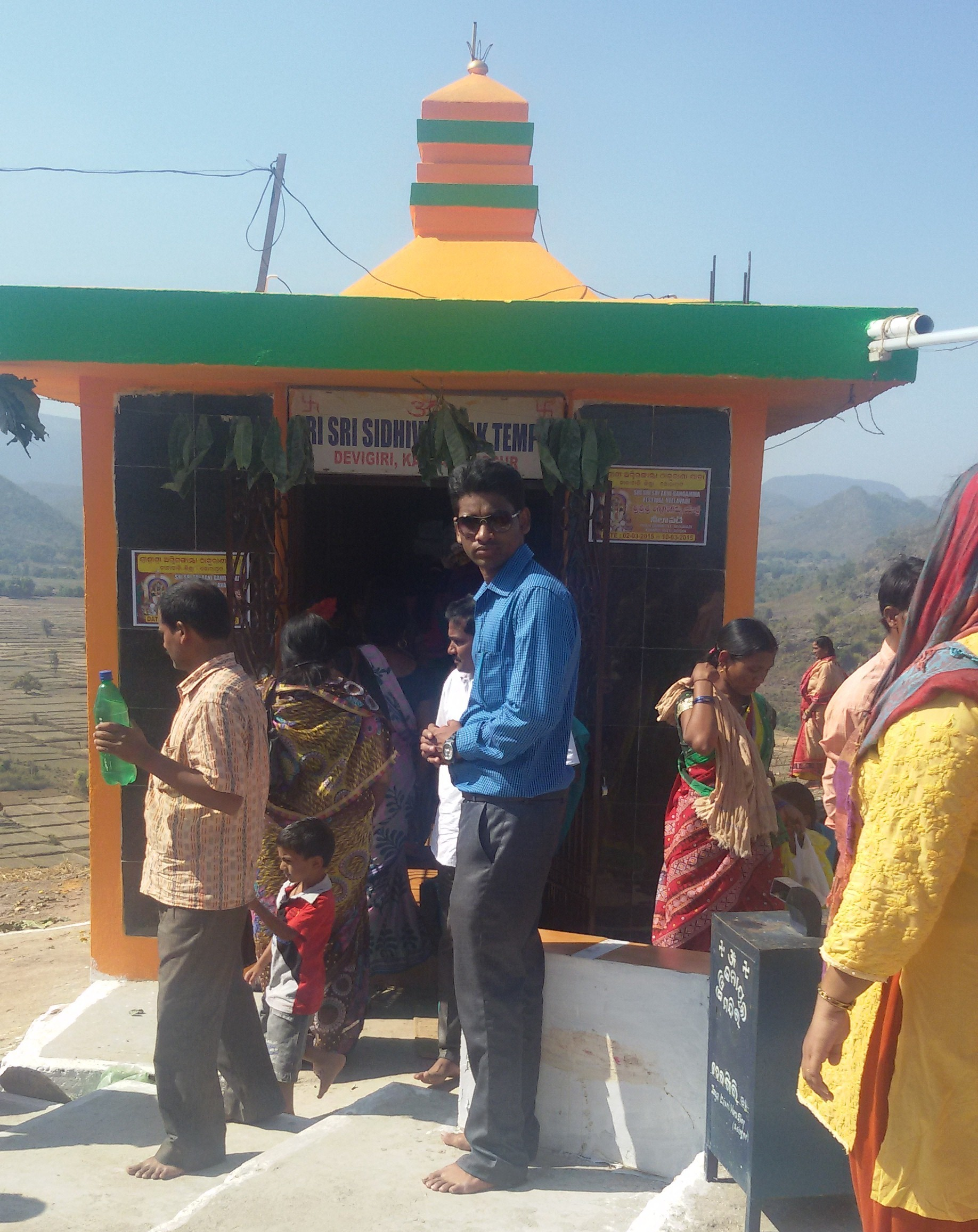
Sidhhi Vinayak Temple on the Devagiri hill

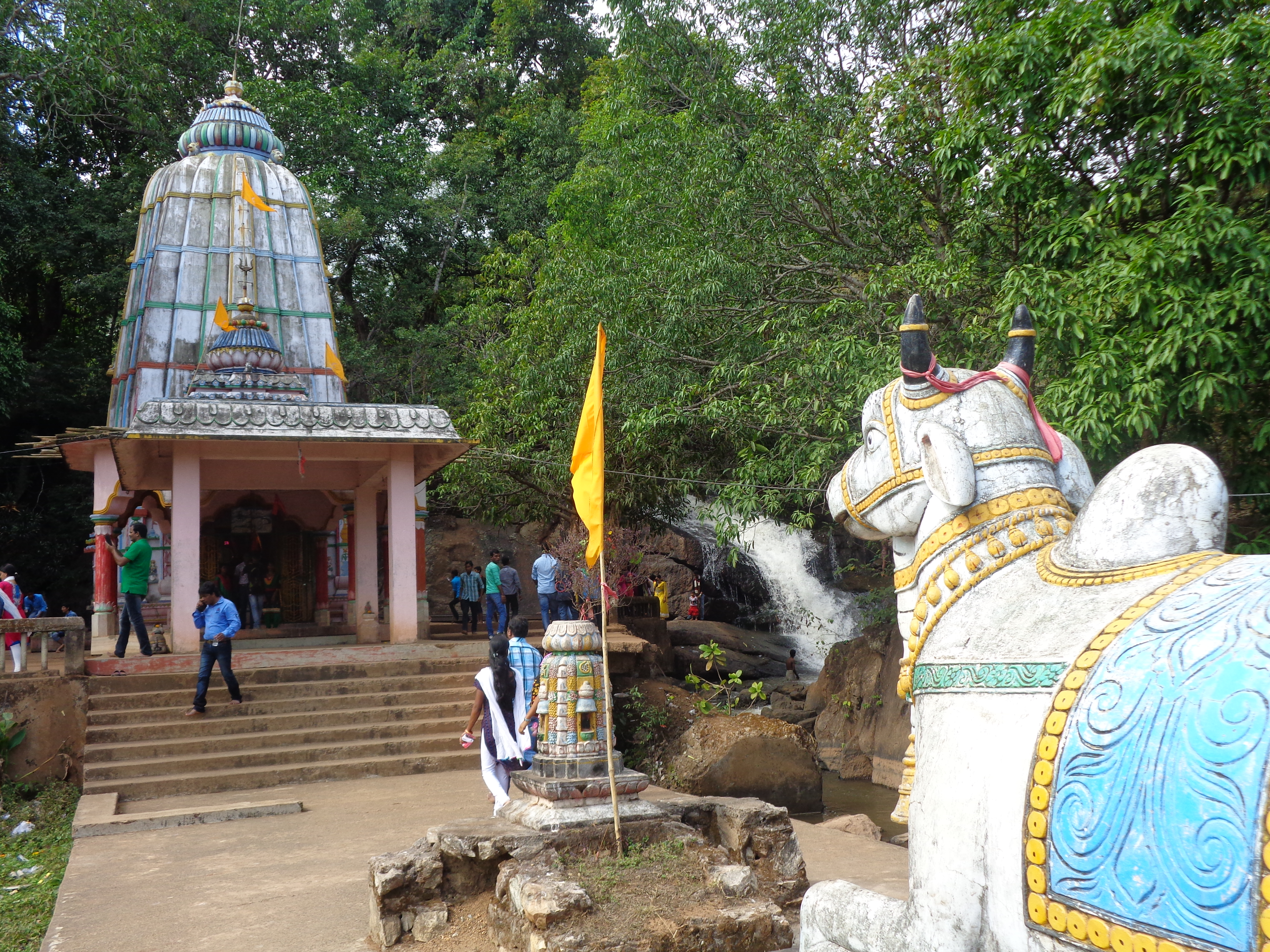
Shiv Temple & Waterfall at Chatikana

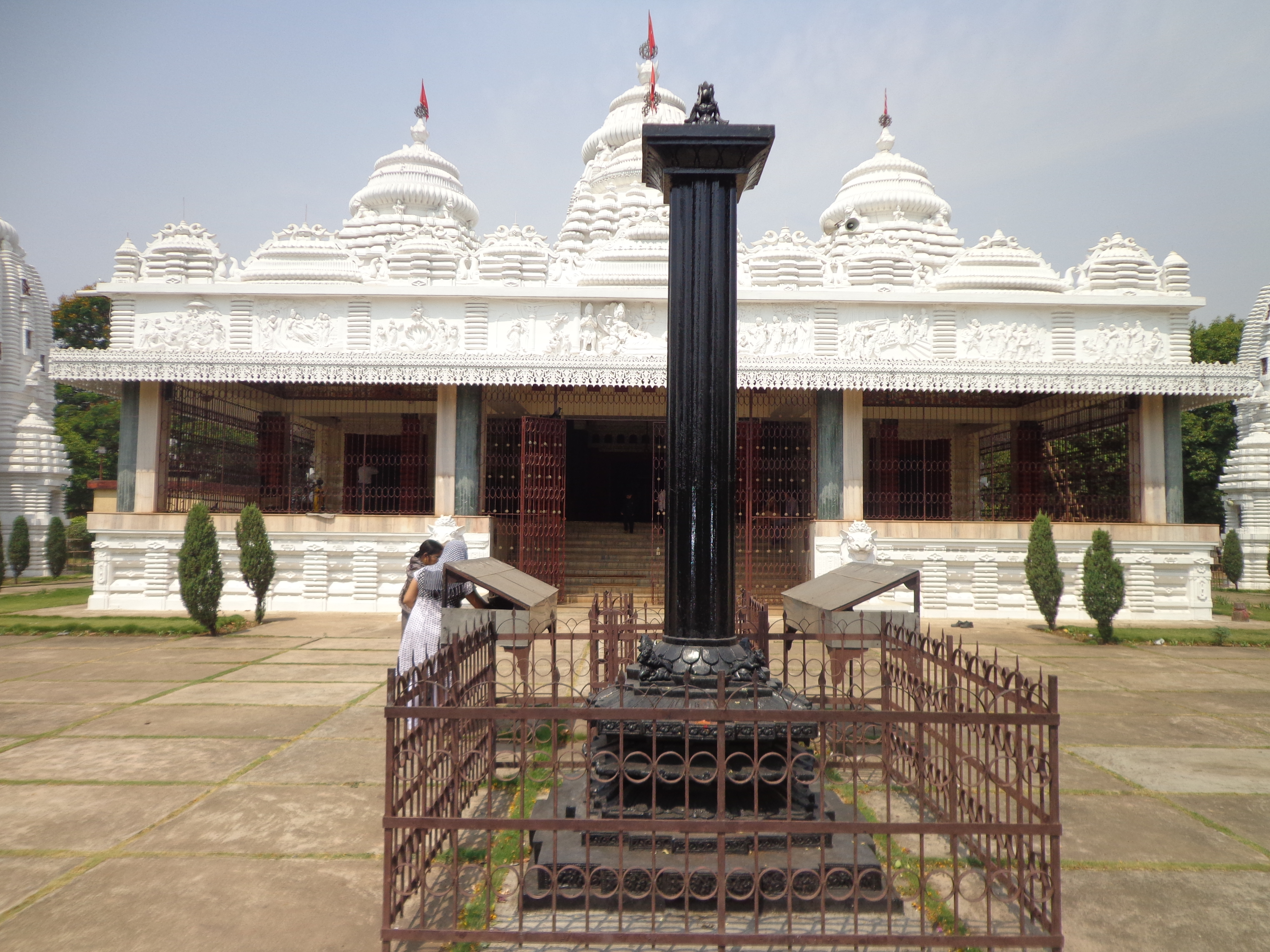
Laxminarayana Temple at Therubali

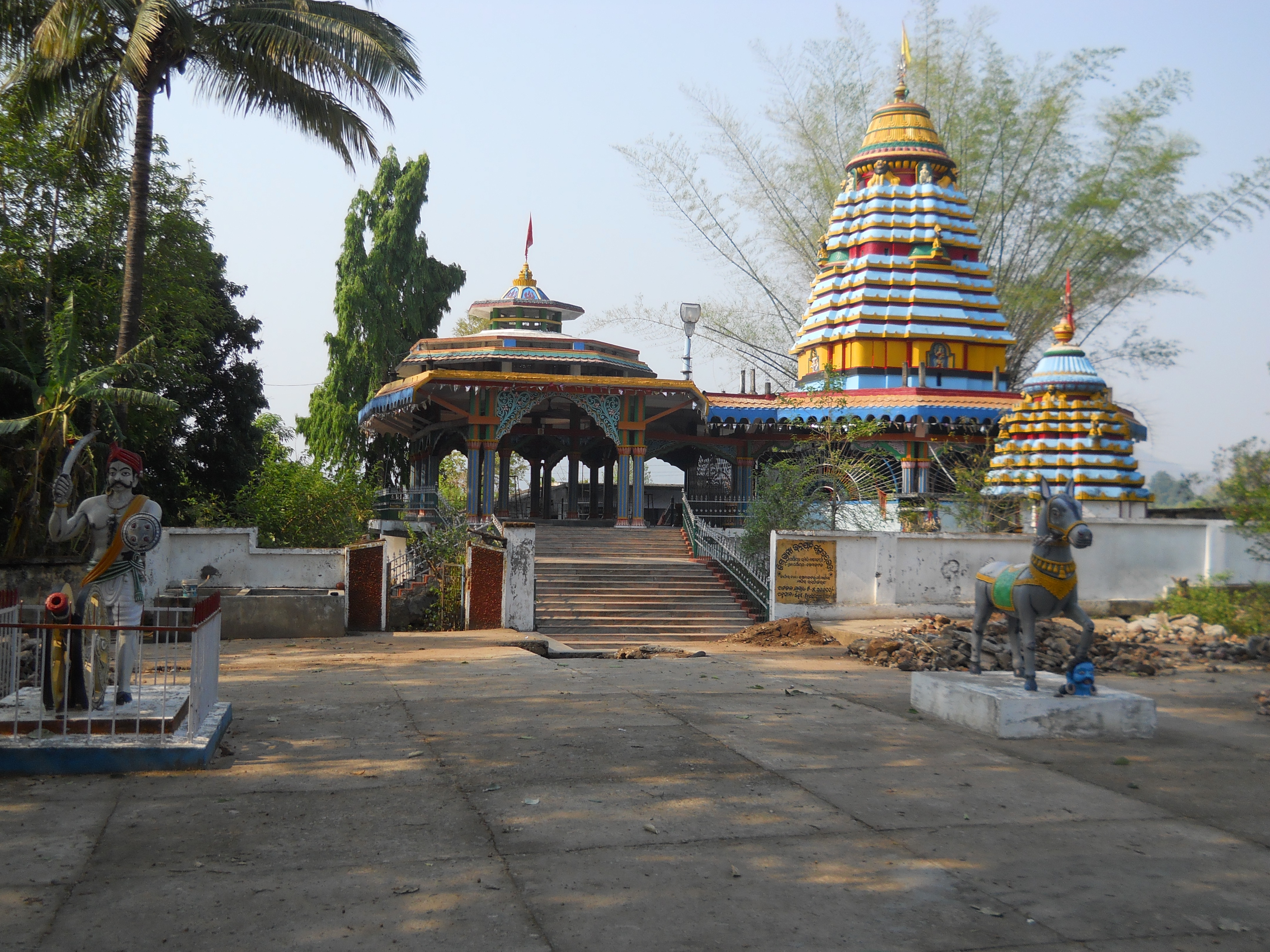
Maa Markama Temple

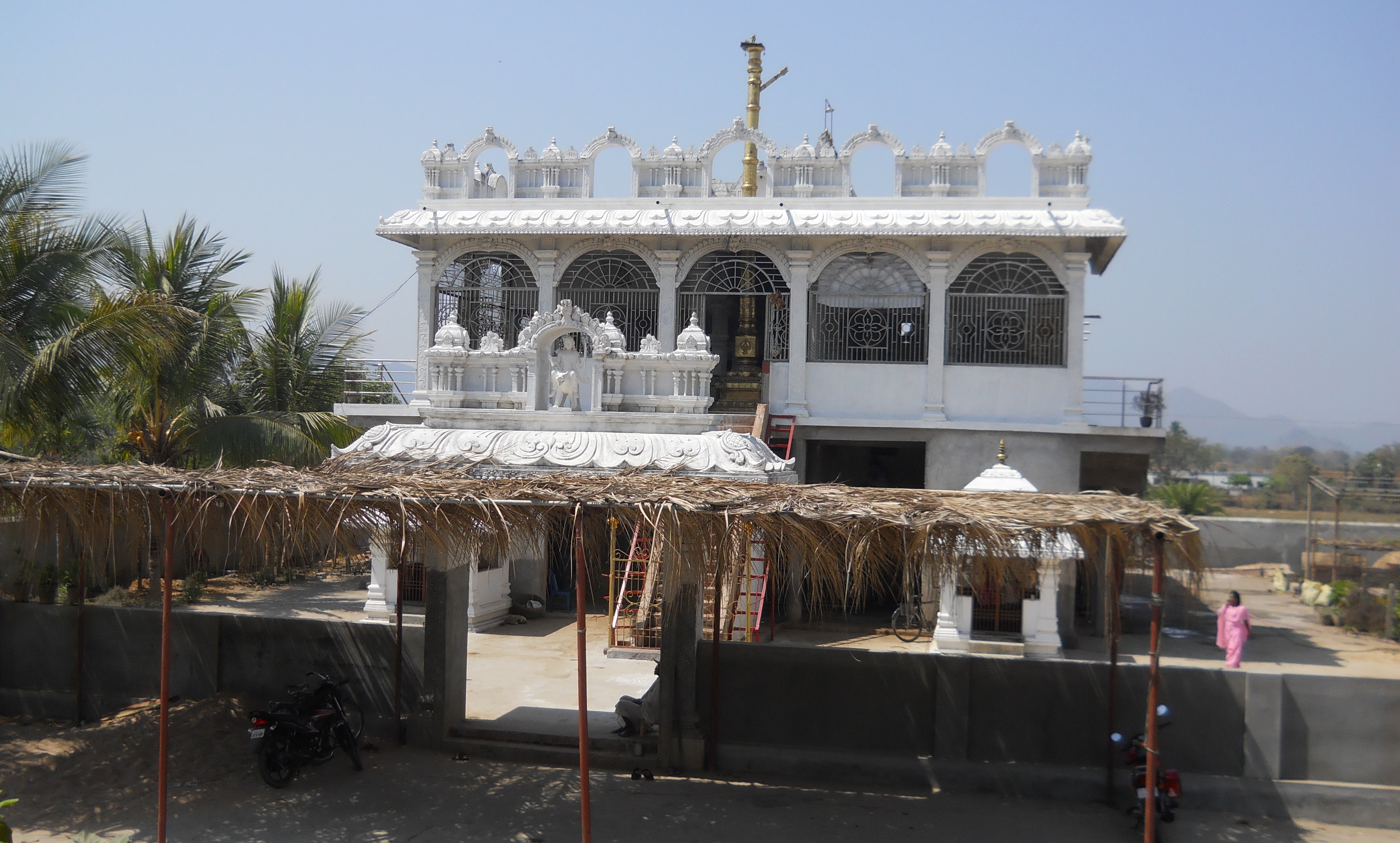
Swamy Ayappa Temple at Bypass Road, Gunupur

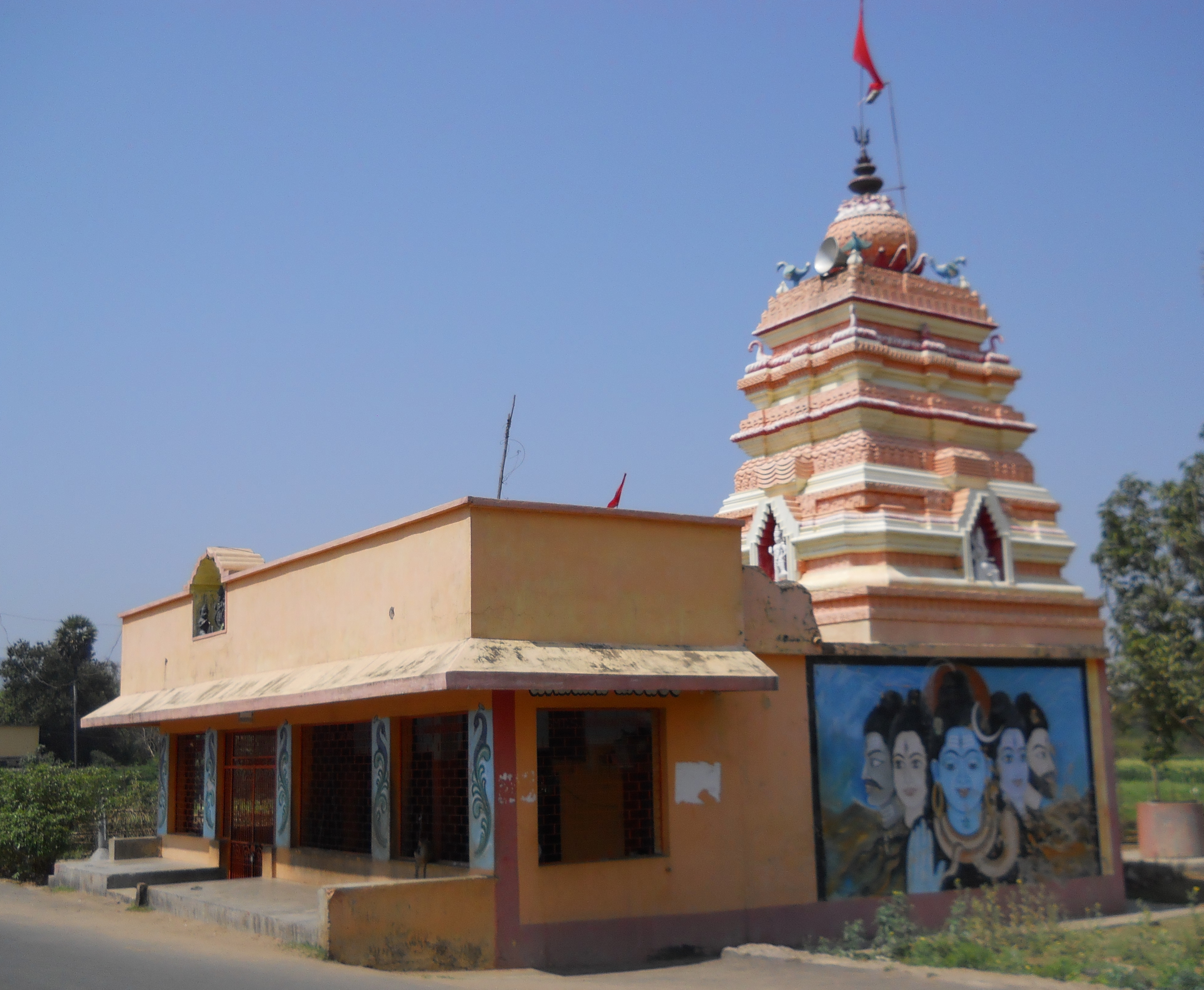
Dakhinamukha Hanumana Temple at Church Road, Gunupur

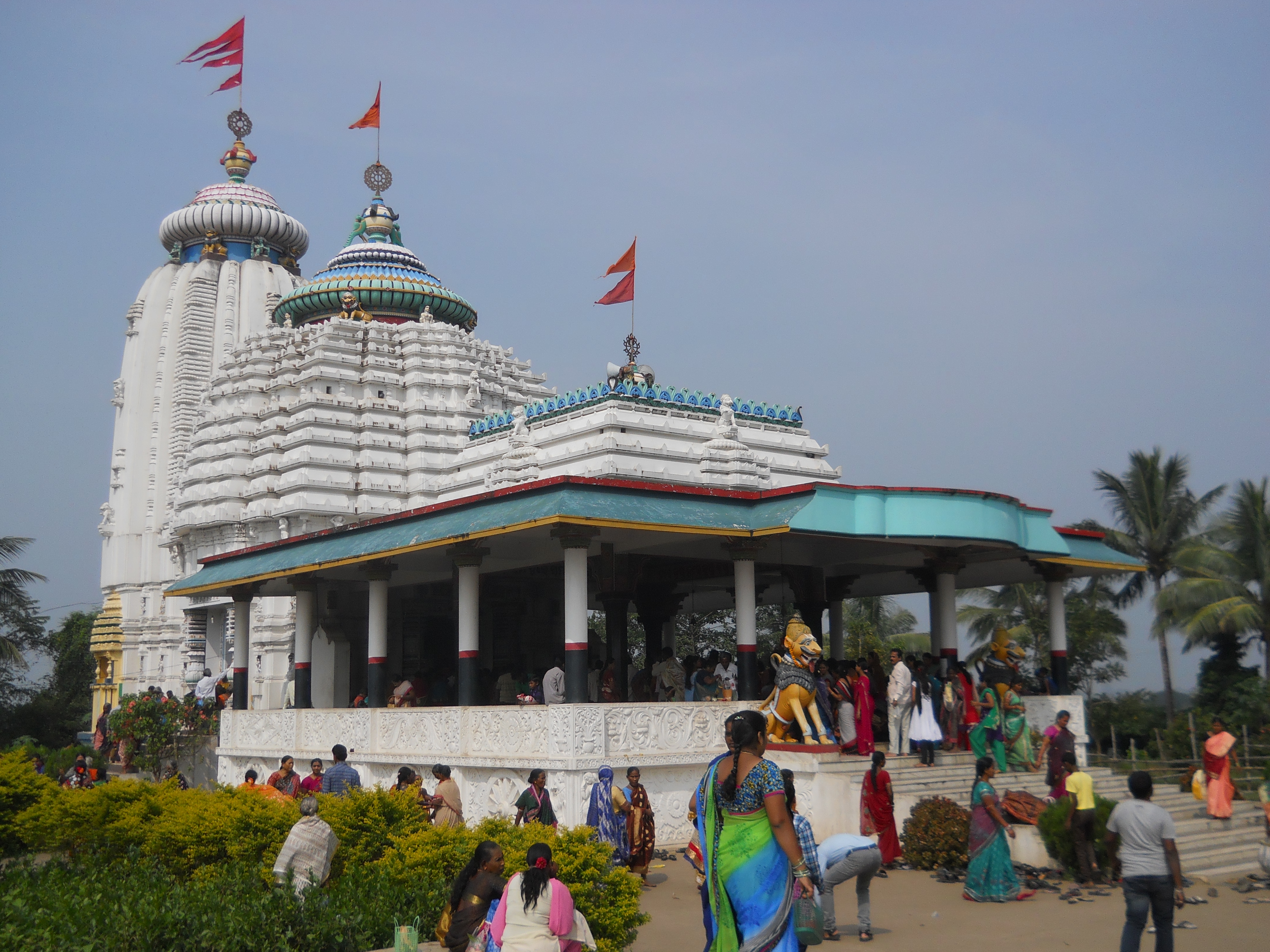
Jagannath temple at Gunupur, Rayagada

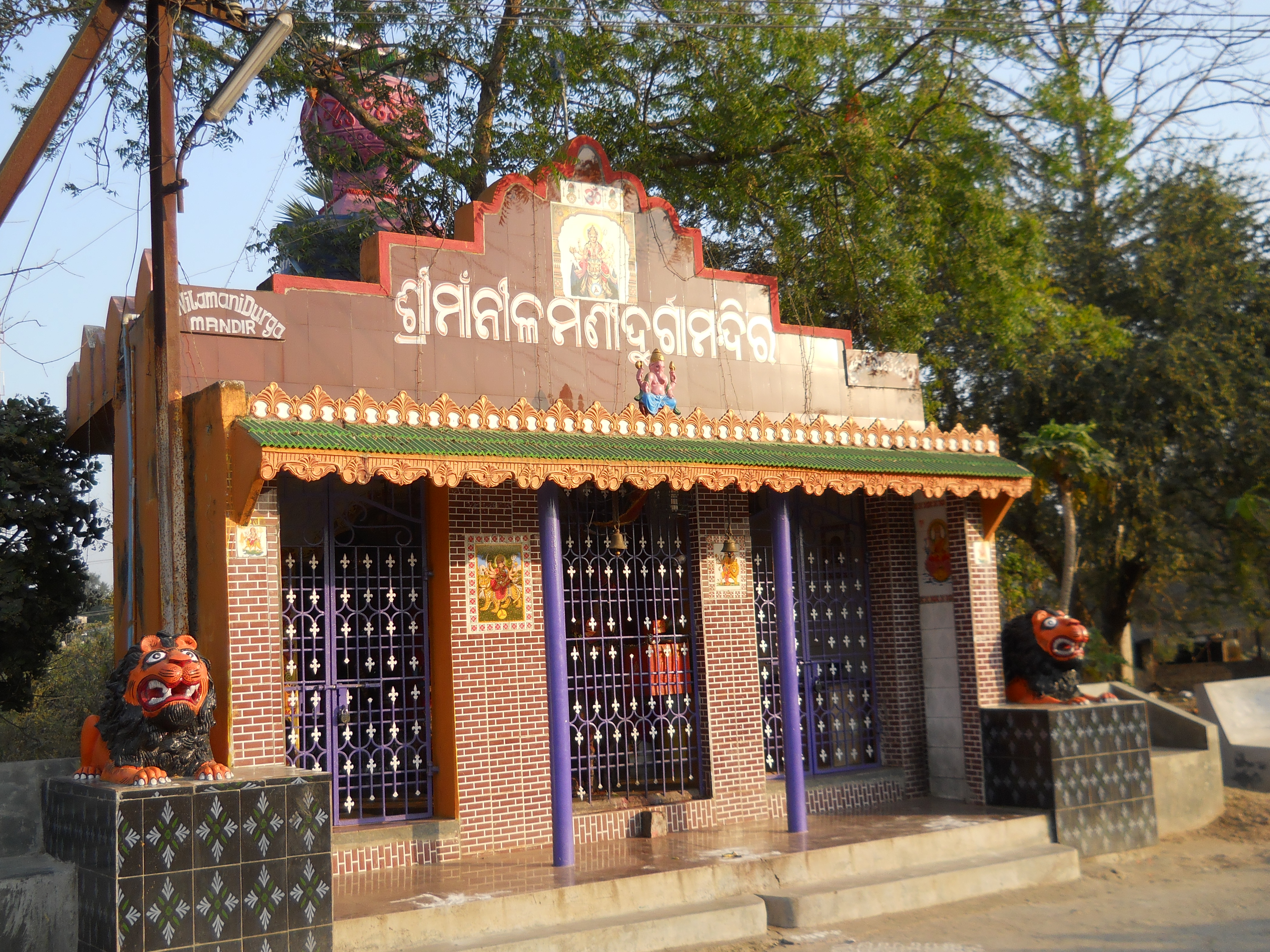
Neelamani Durga Temple, Gunupur

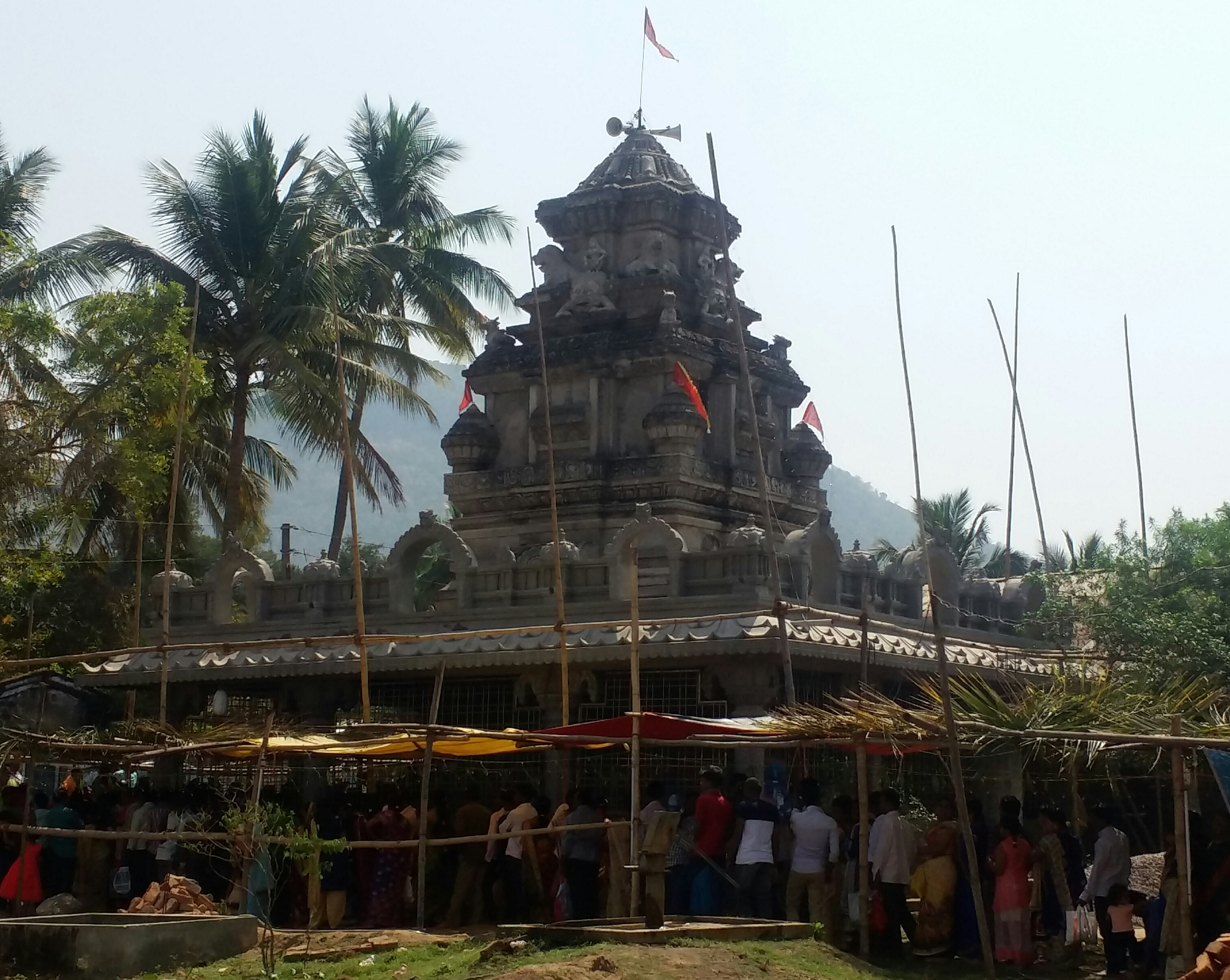
Bhimshankar Jyotirlinga(Dakinyam) temple at Bhimpur

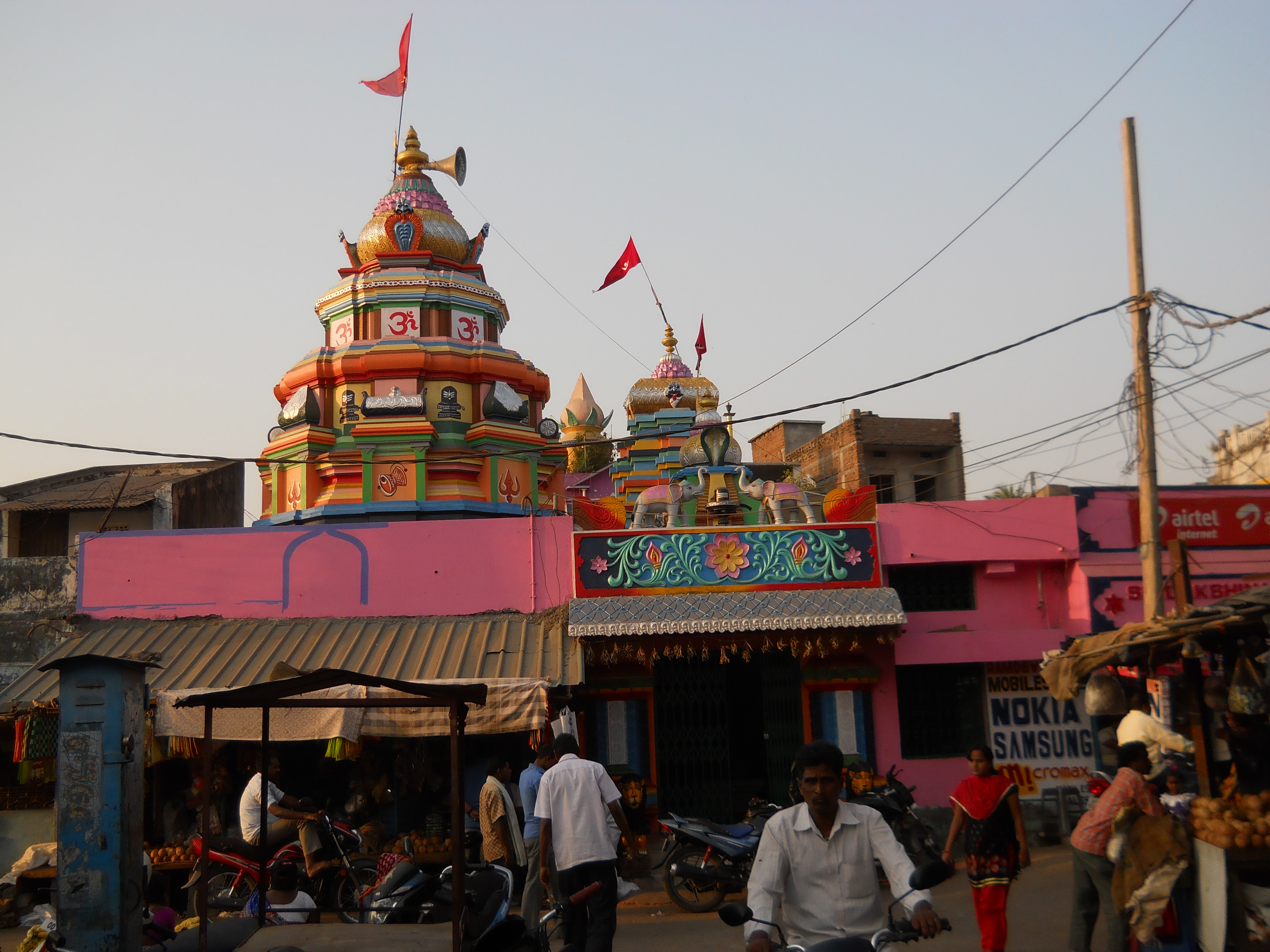
Dakhina Kali Temple, Gunupur

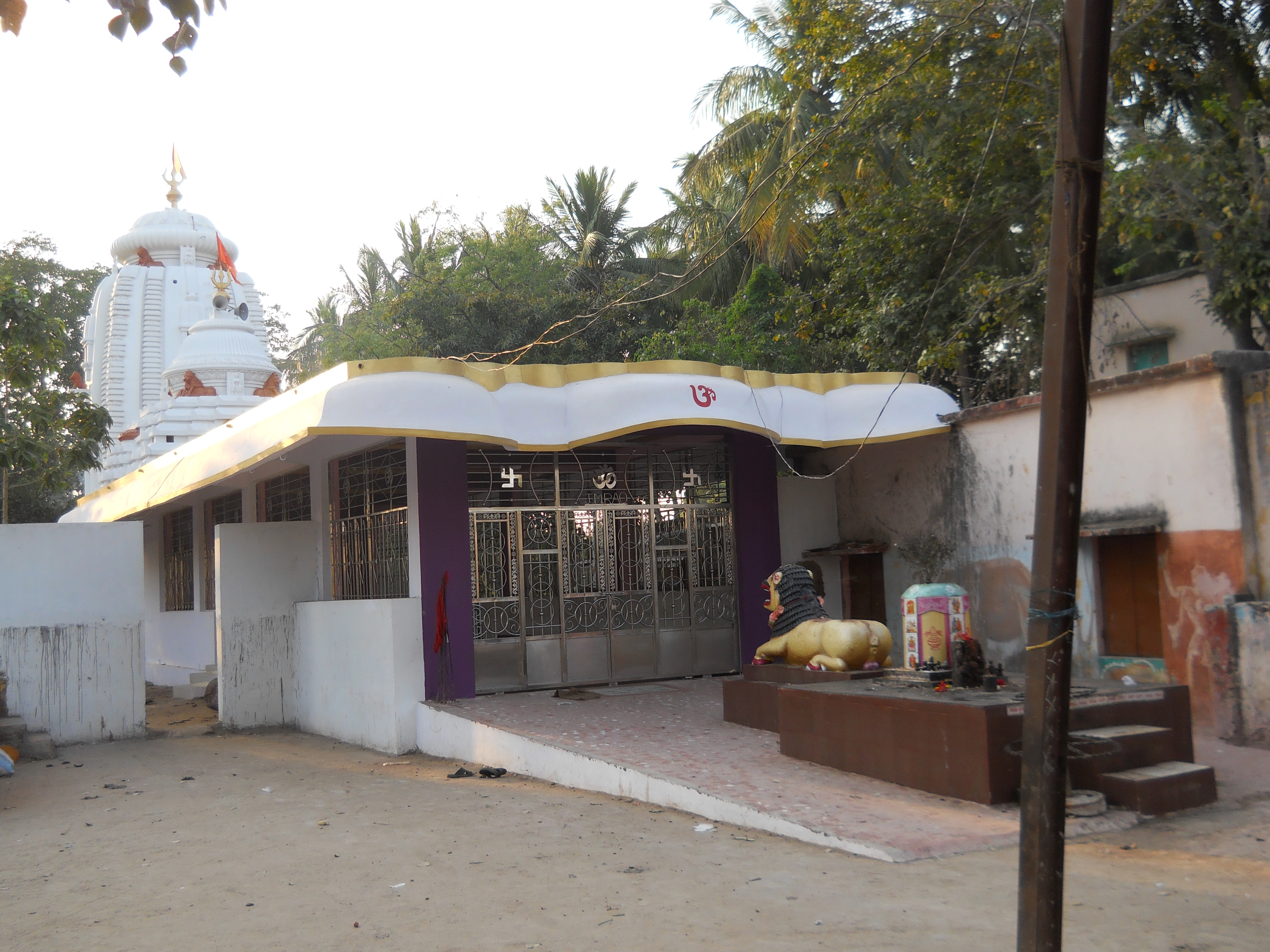
Shiva Temple(popularly known as Baghua Deula) near old bus stand, Gunupur

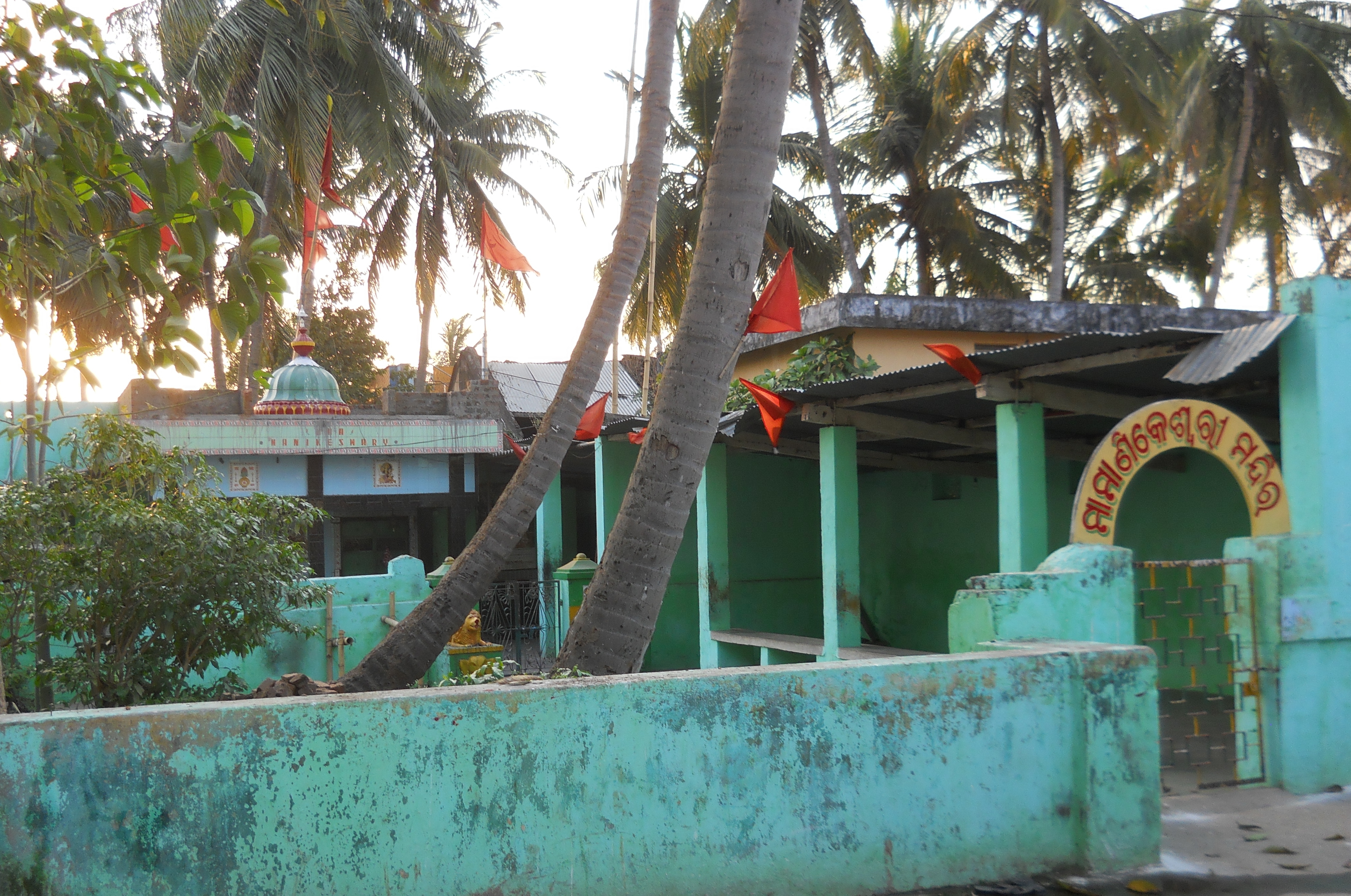
Maa Manikeshwari Temple, Gunupur

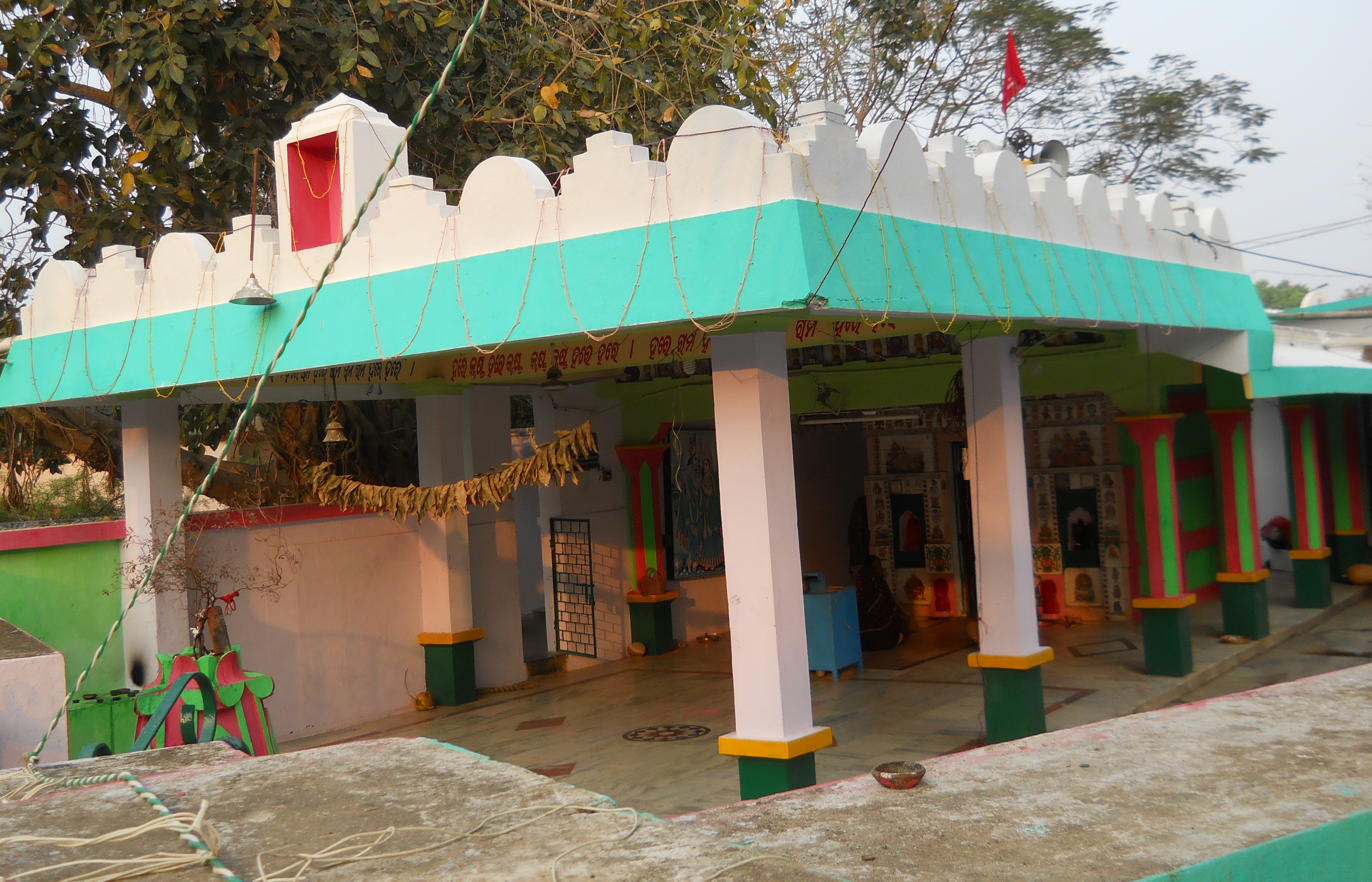
Radha Krushna Temple, Gunupur

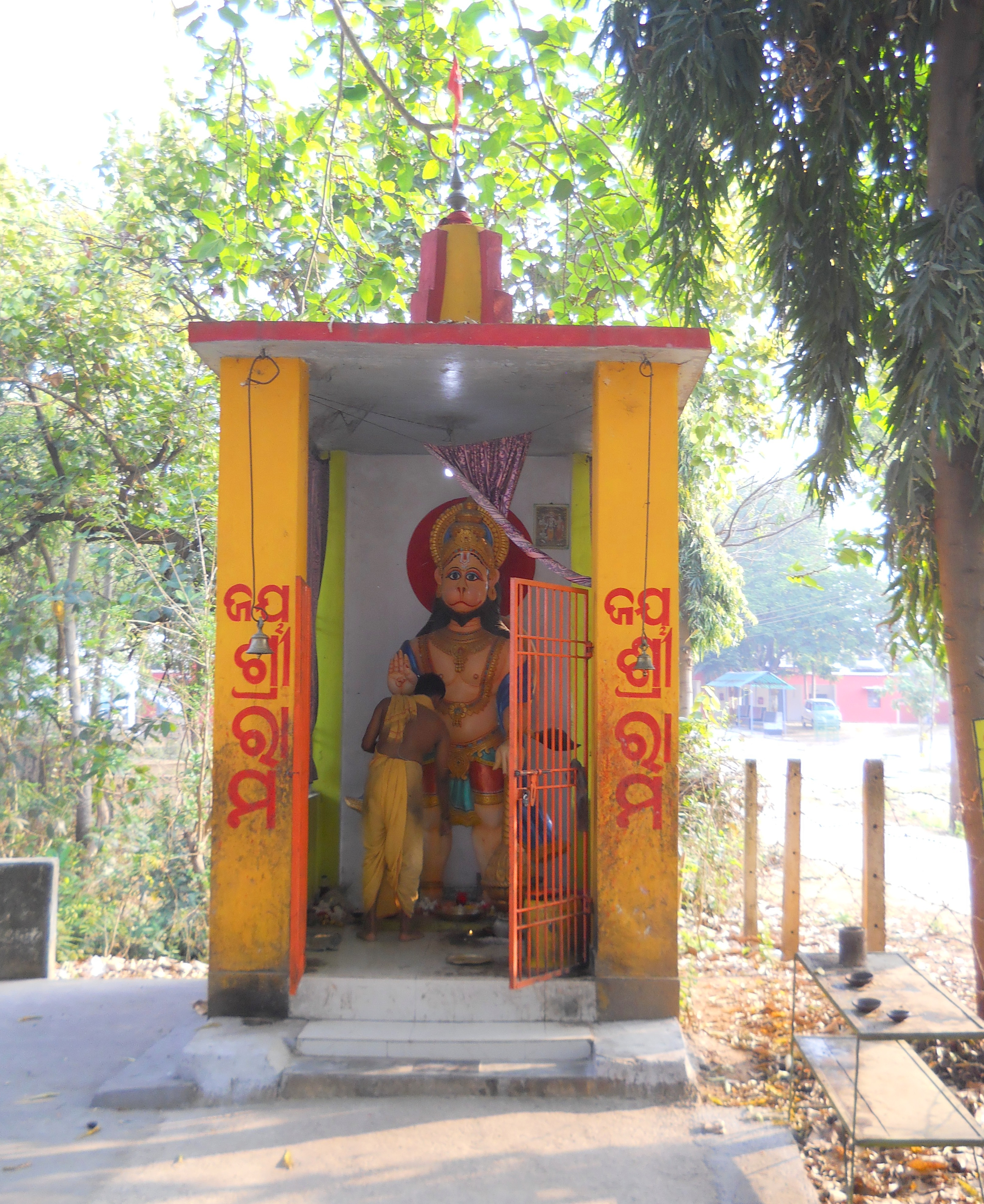
Hanuman Temple at Civil Courts Square, Gunupur

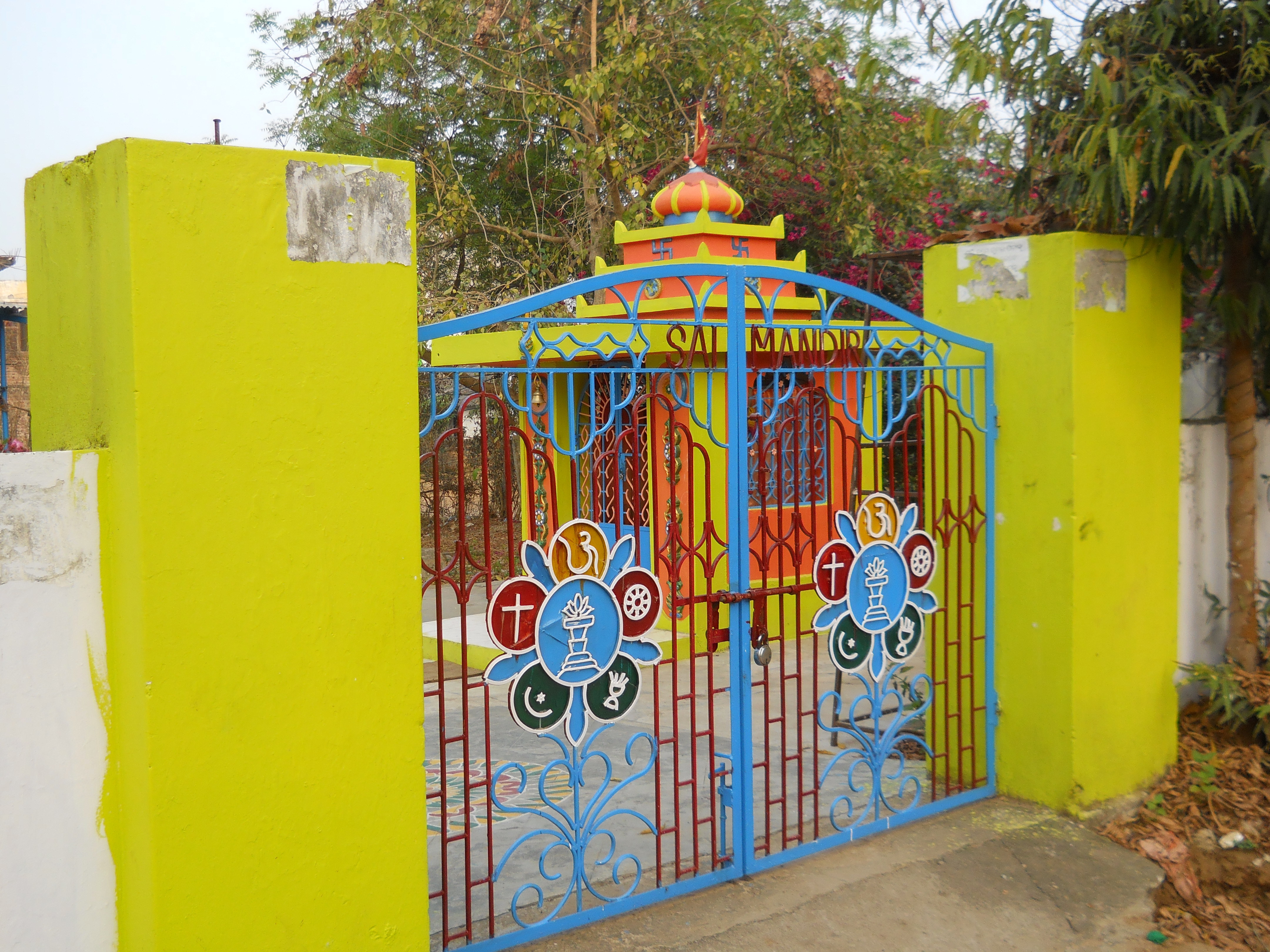
Satya Sai Temple, Gunupur

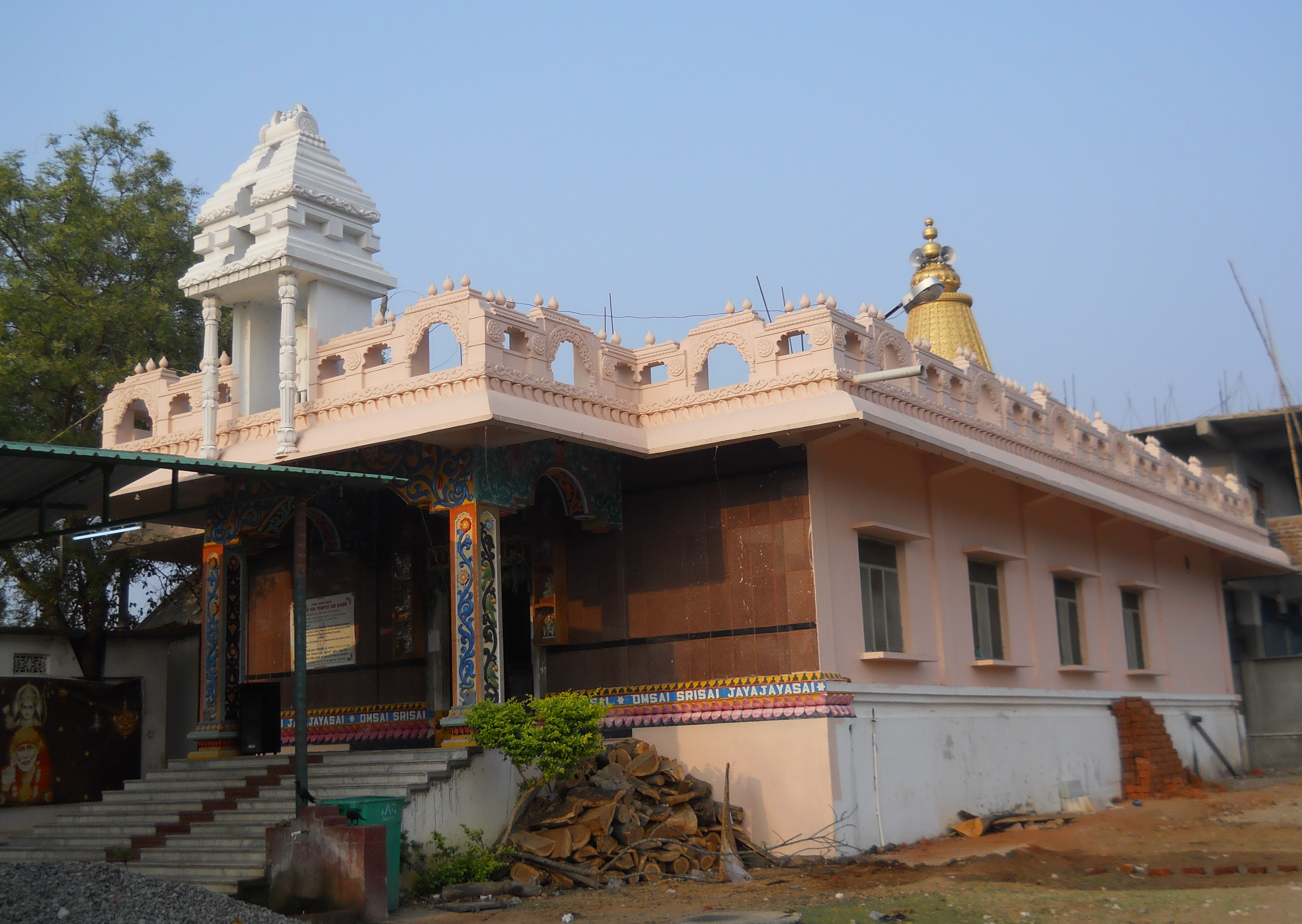
Shiridi Sai Temple, Gunupur

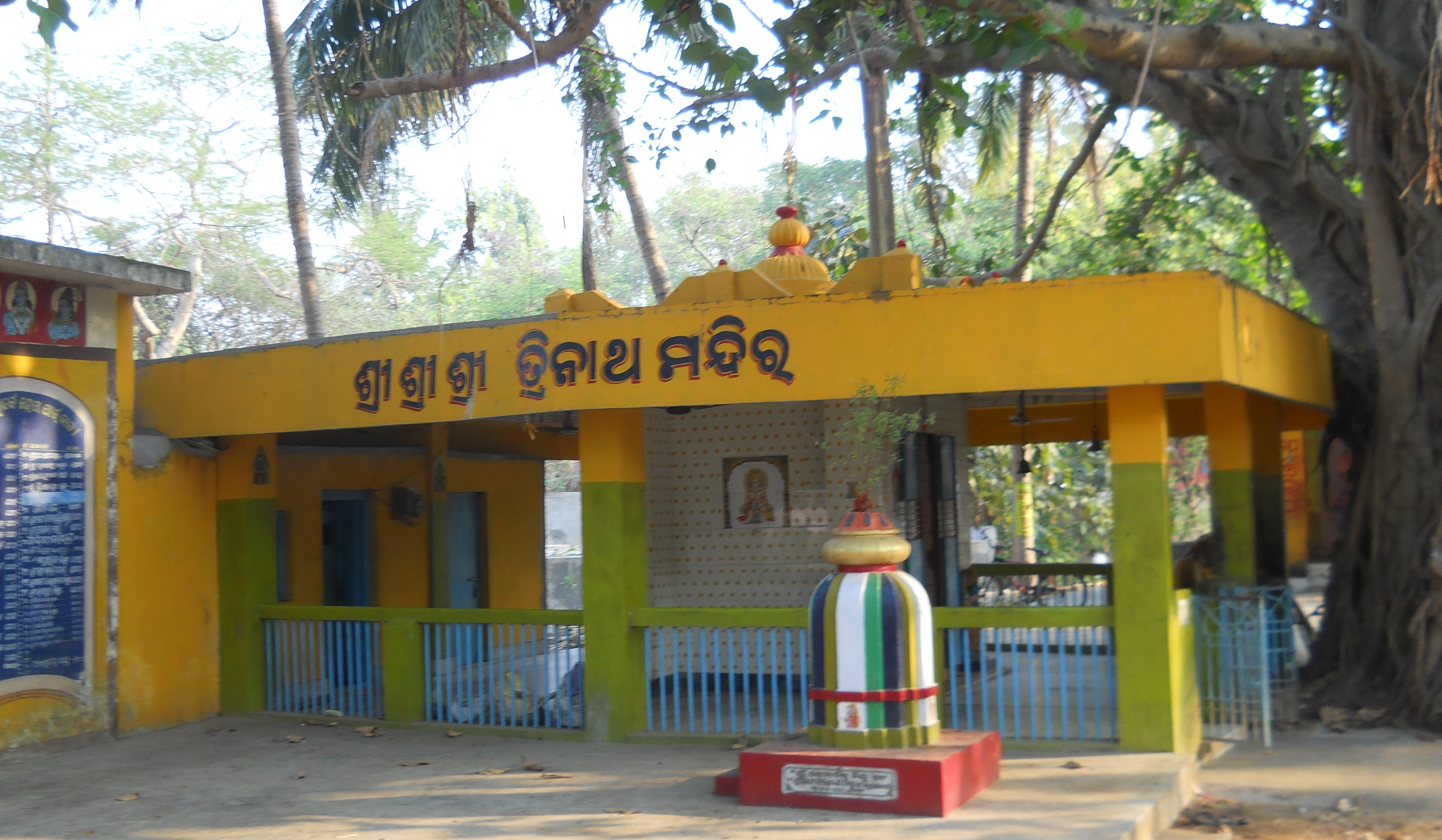
Trinath Temple at Civil Courts Square, Gunupur

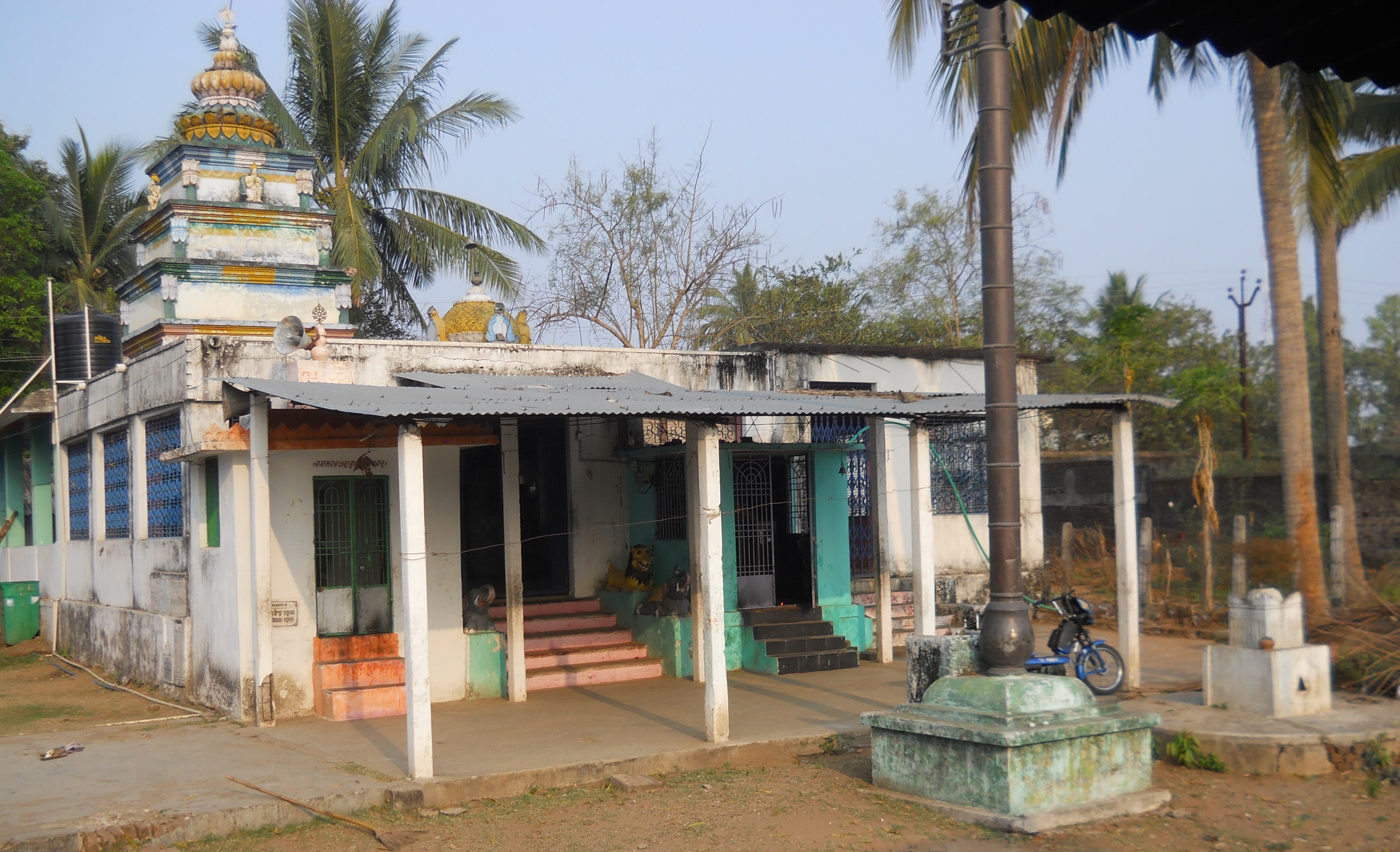
Venketeswar Temple, Gunupur

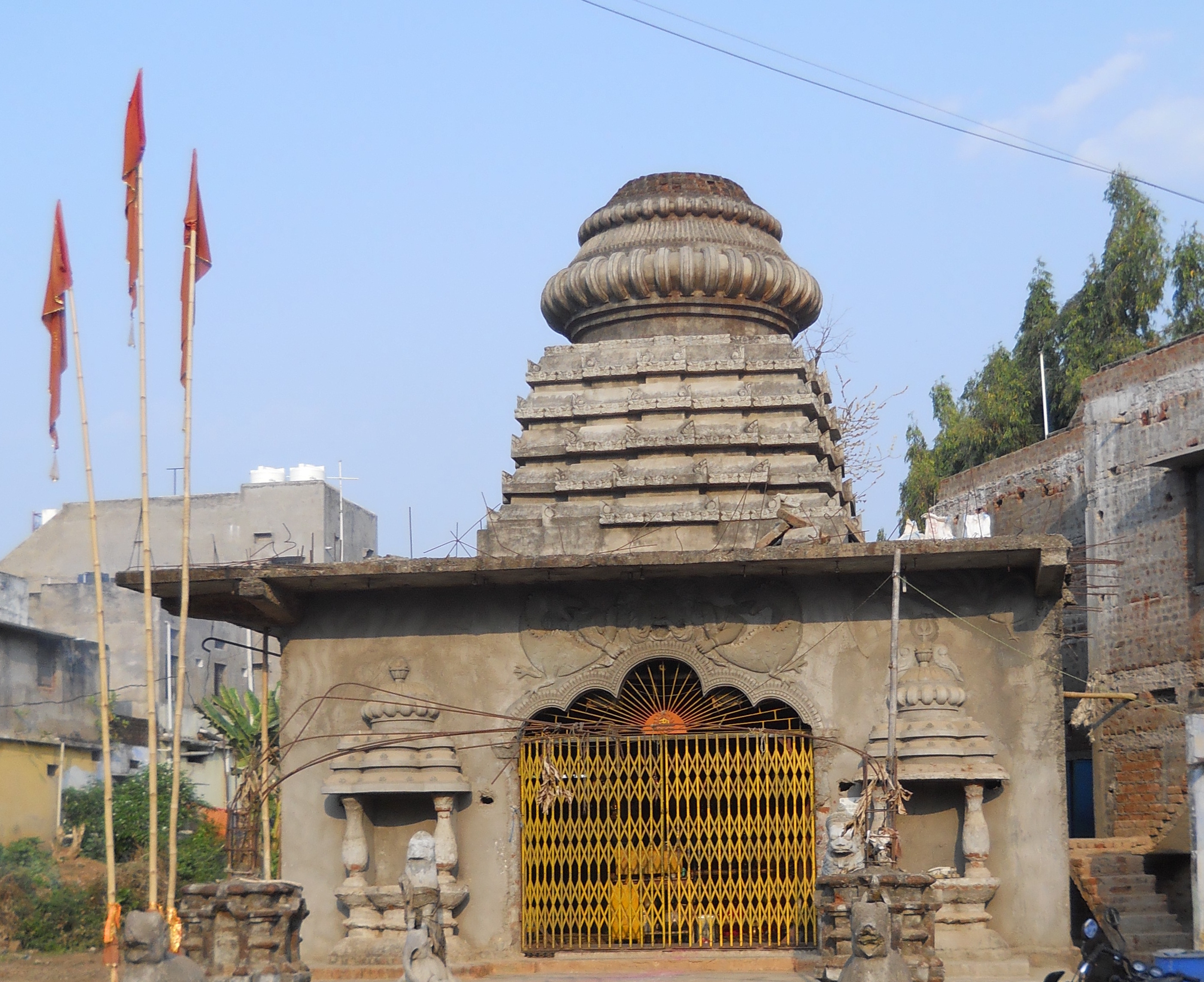
Mangala Temple, Gunupur

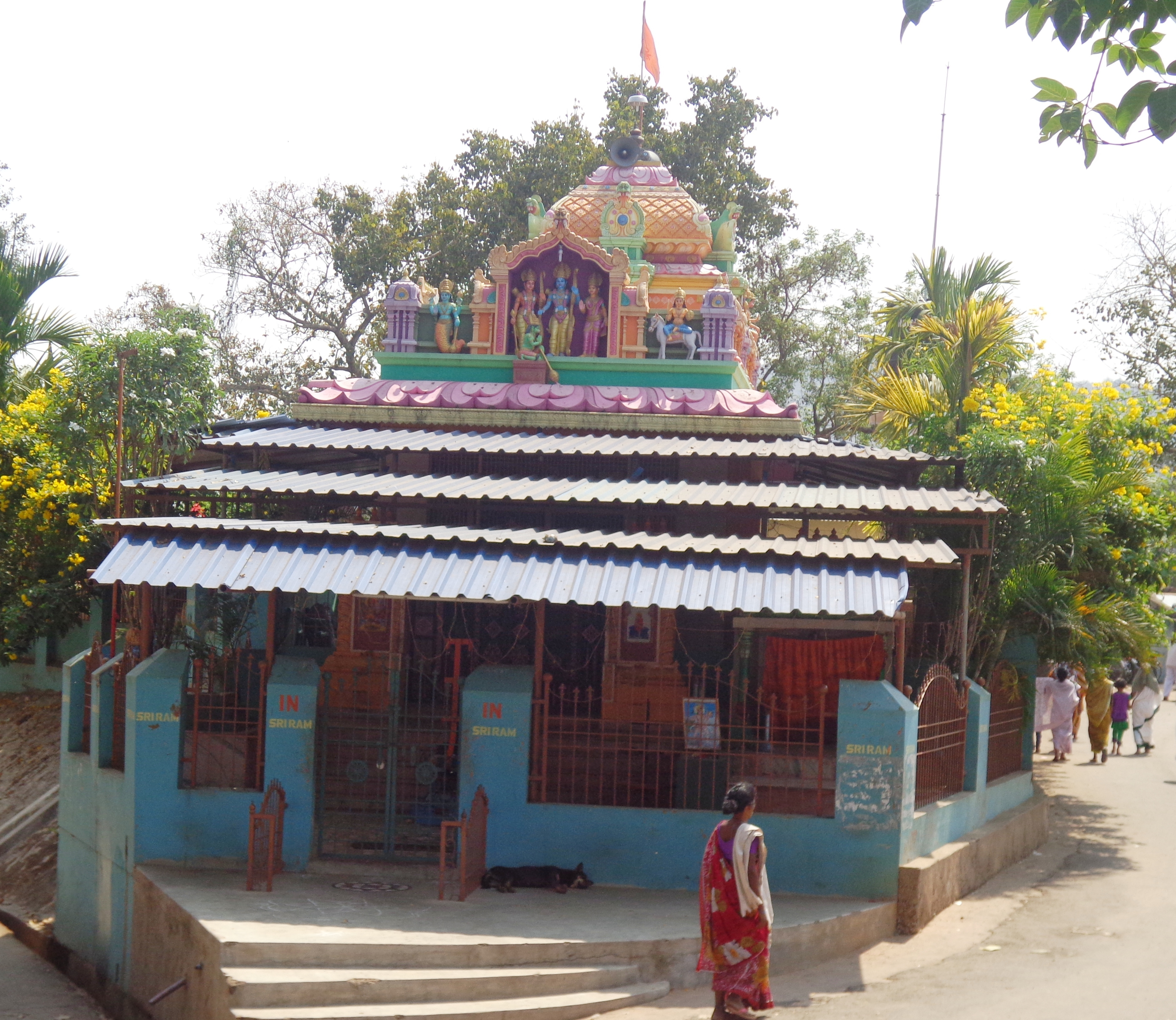
Hanuman Temple at Daily Market, Rayagada

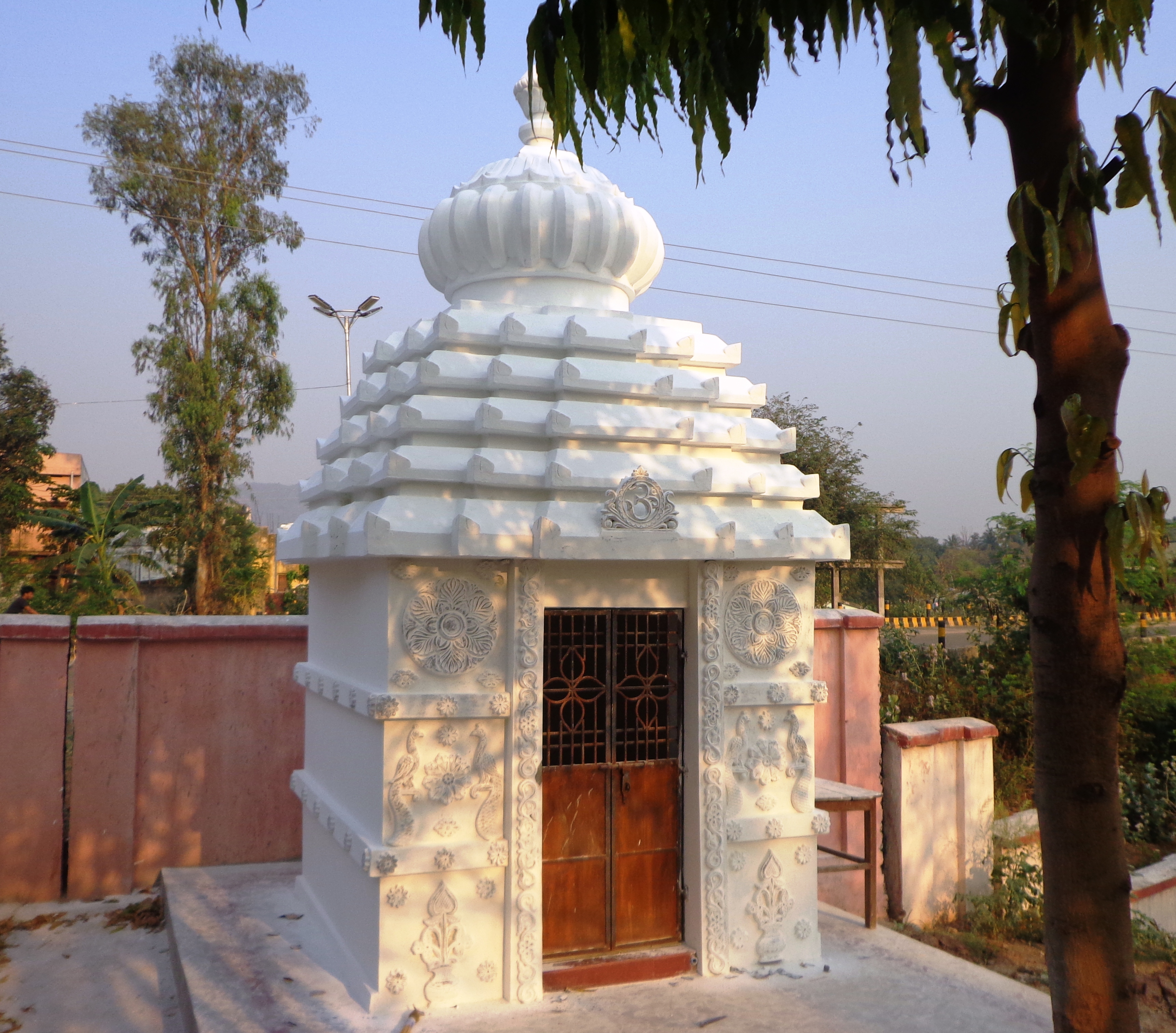
Trinath Temple at Bypass Road, Rayagada

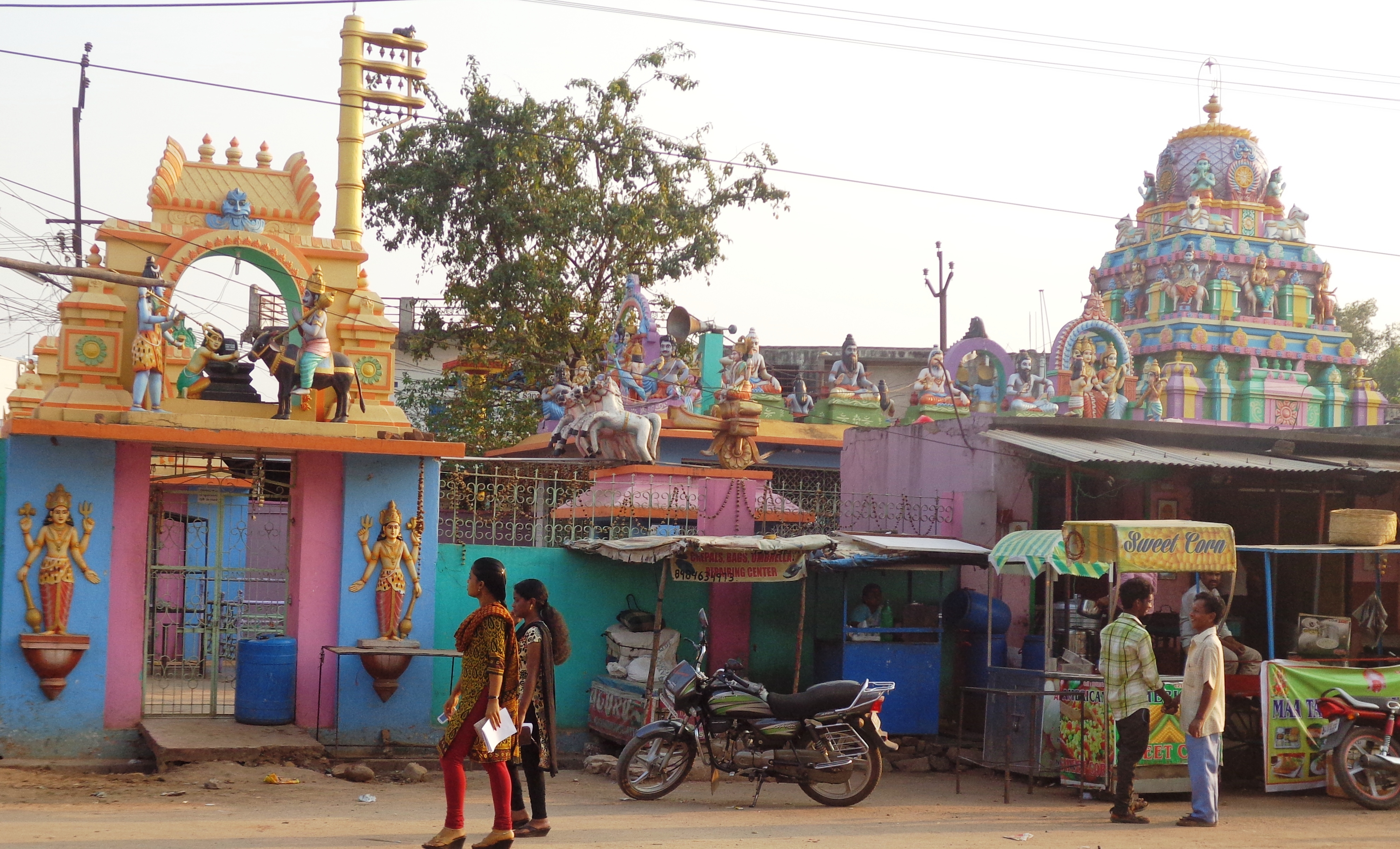
Shiva Temple at Jyotimahal Chouk, Rayagada

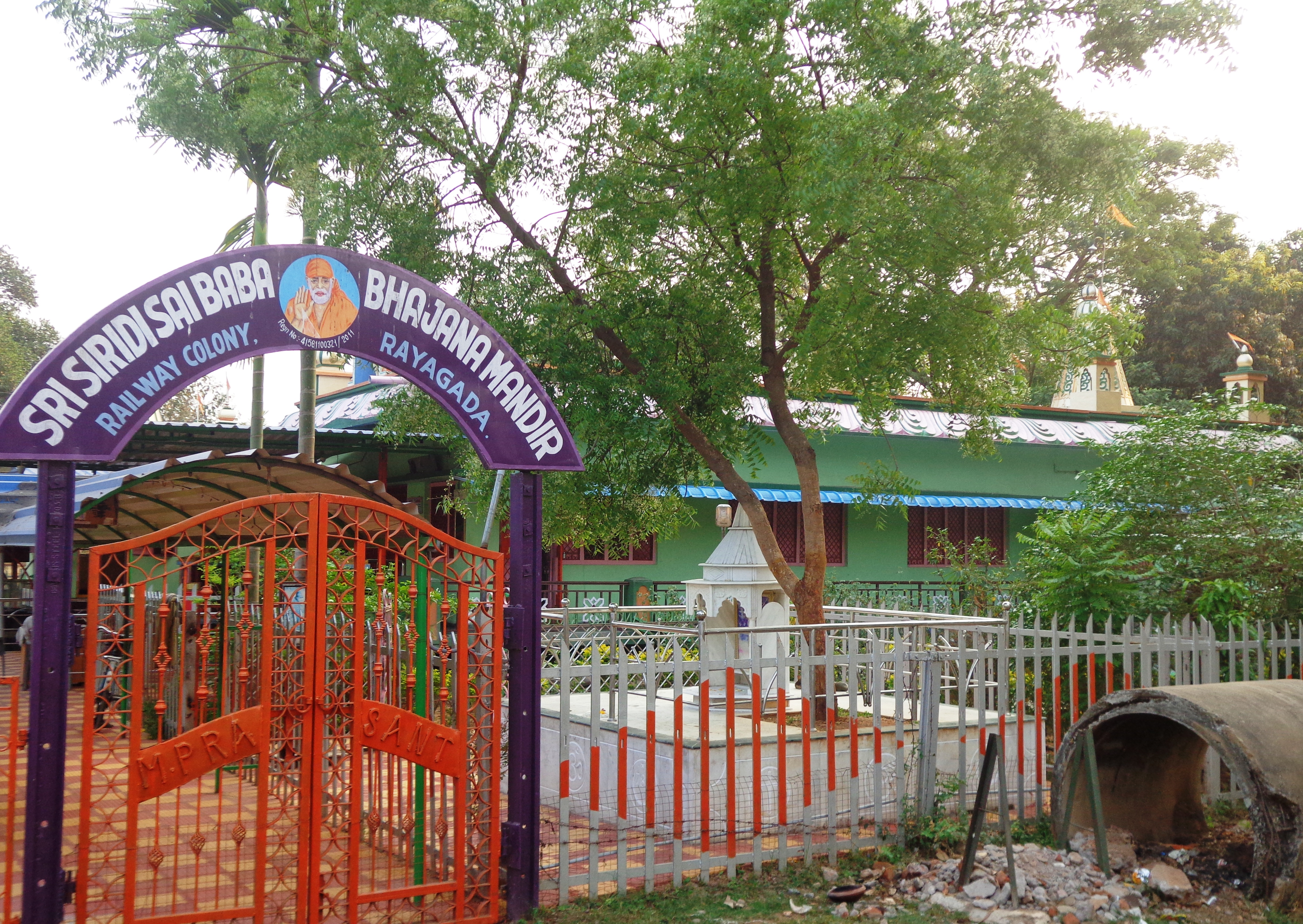
Shiridi Saibaba Temple at Railway Colony, Rayagada

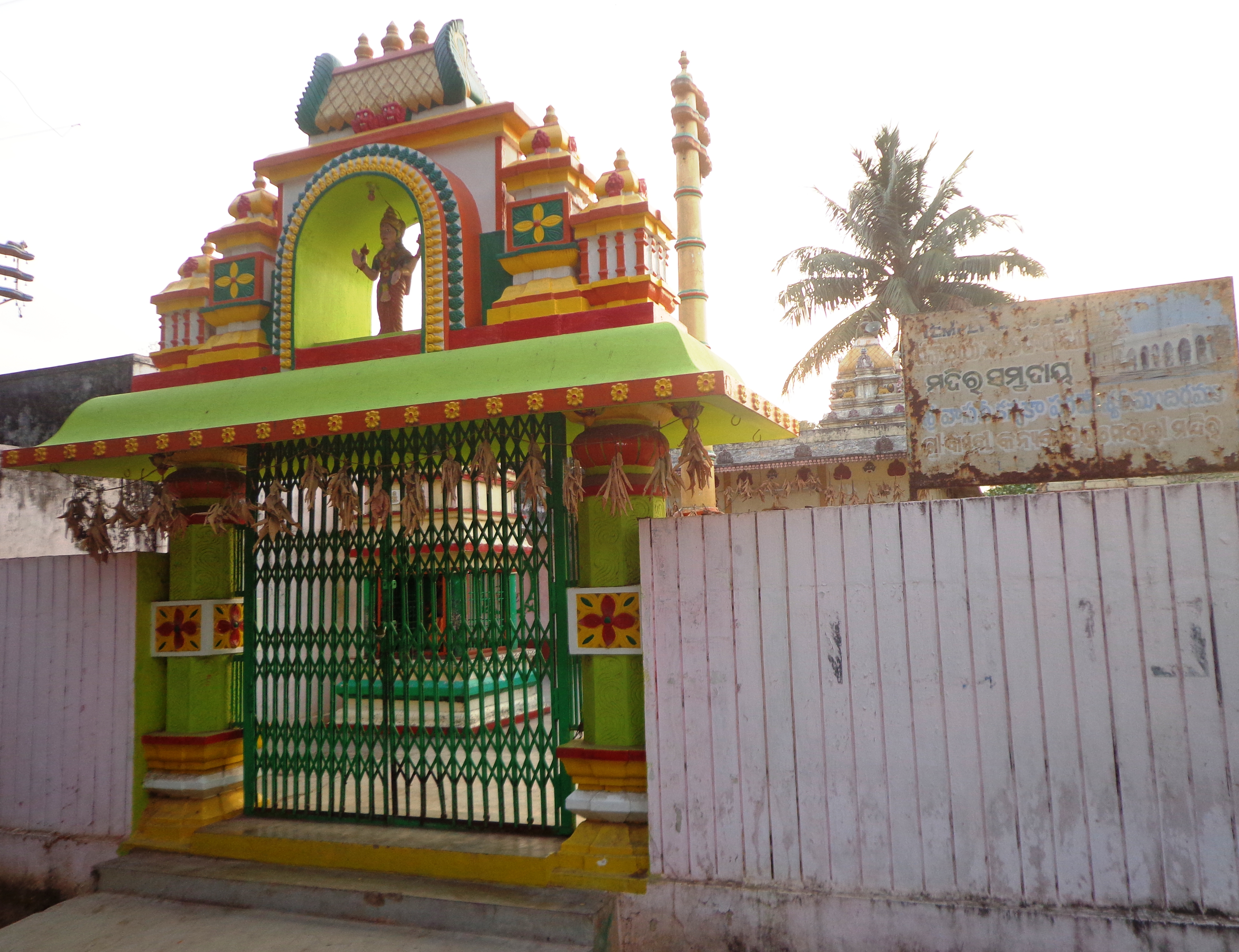
Sri Vasavi Kanyaka Parameswari Temple, Rayagada

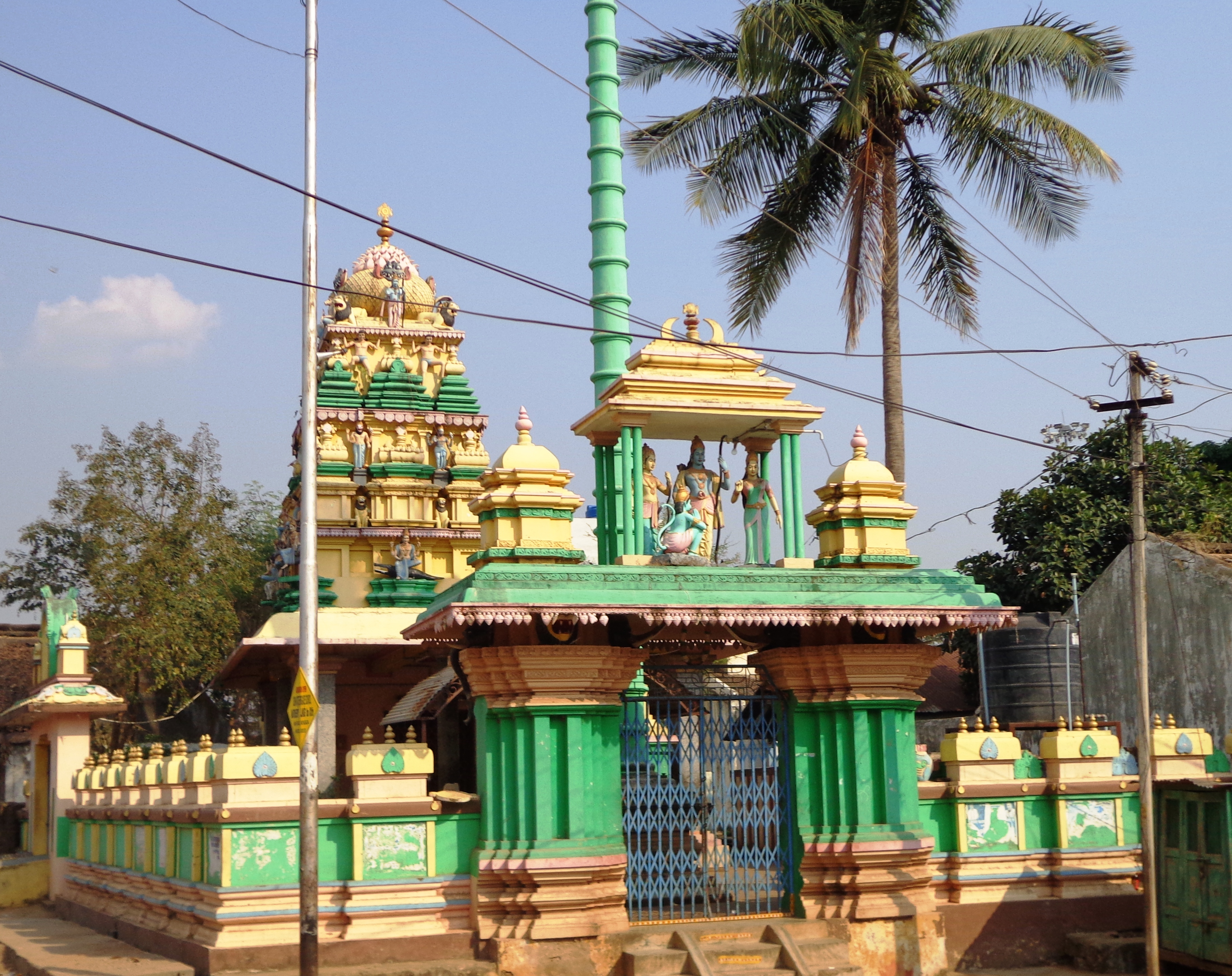
Sri Rama Temple, Rayagada

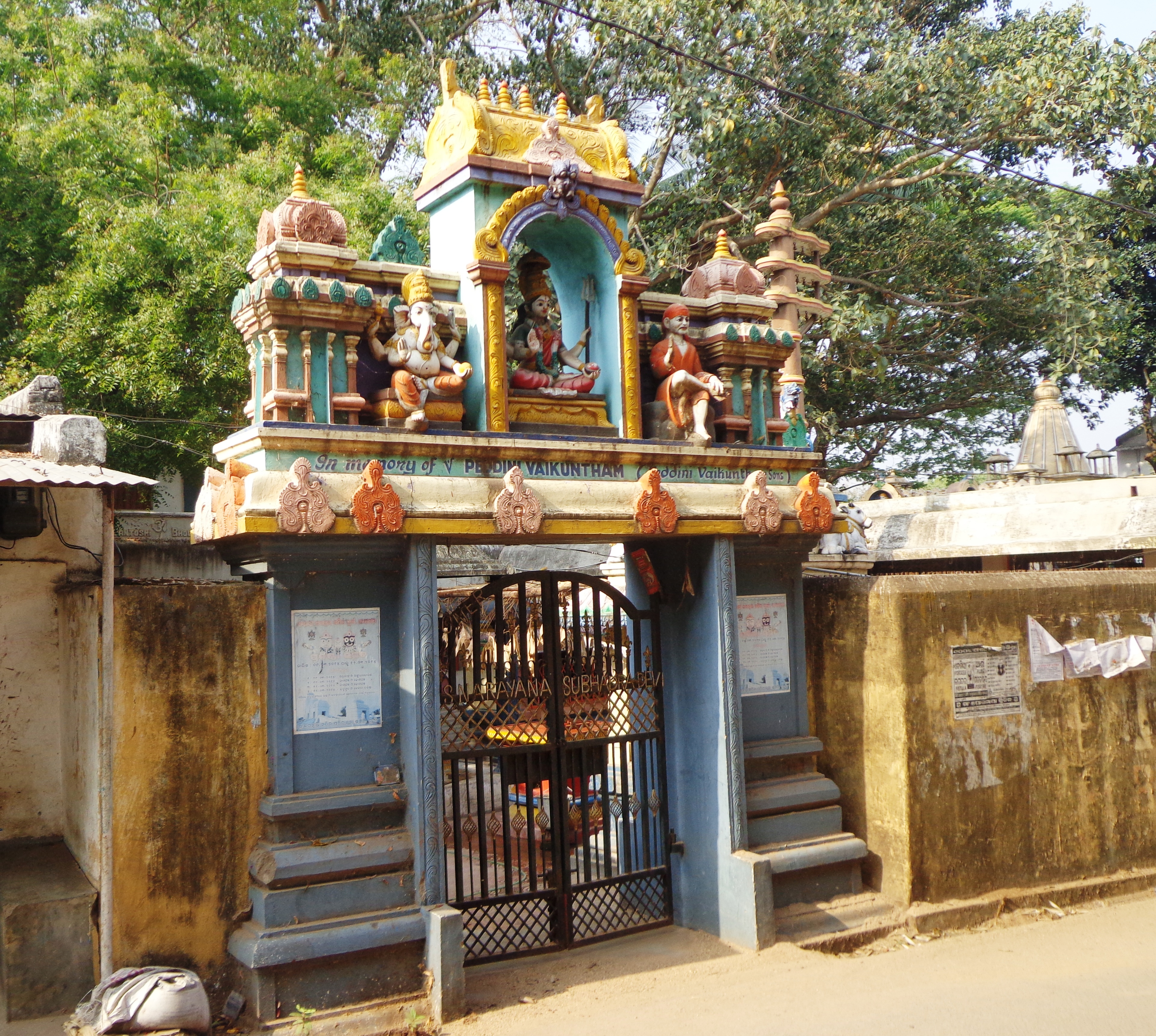
Santoshi Maa Temple, Rayagada

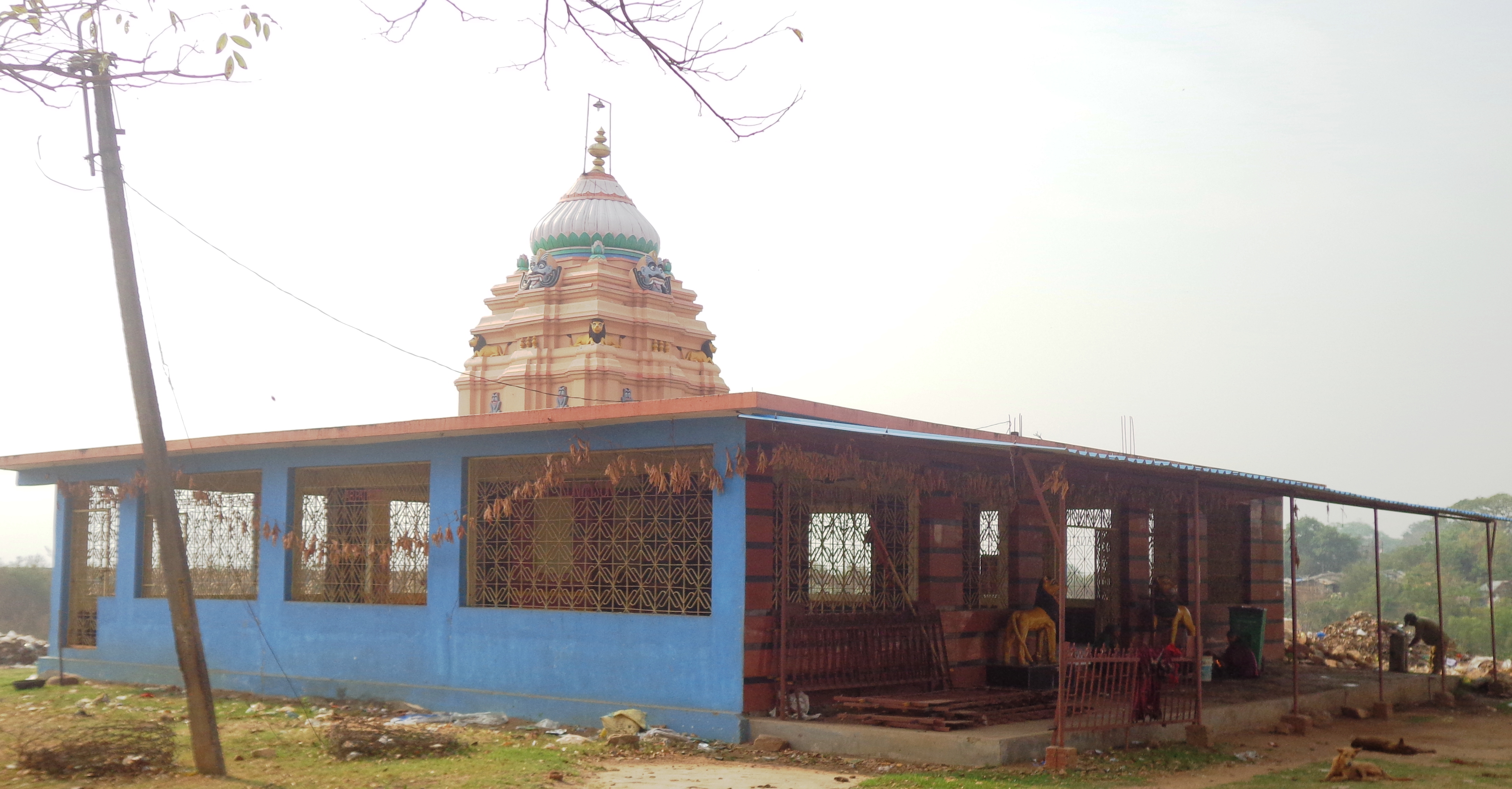
Budra pallama Gramdevati, Rayagada

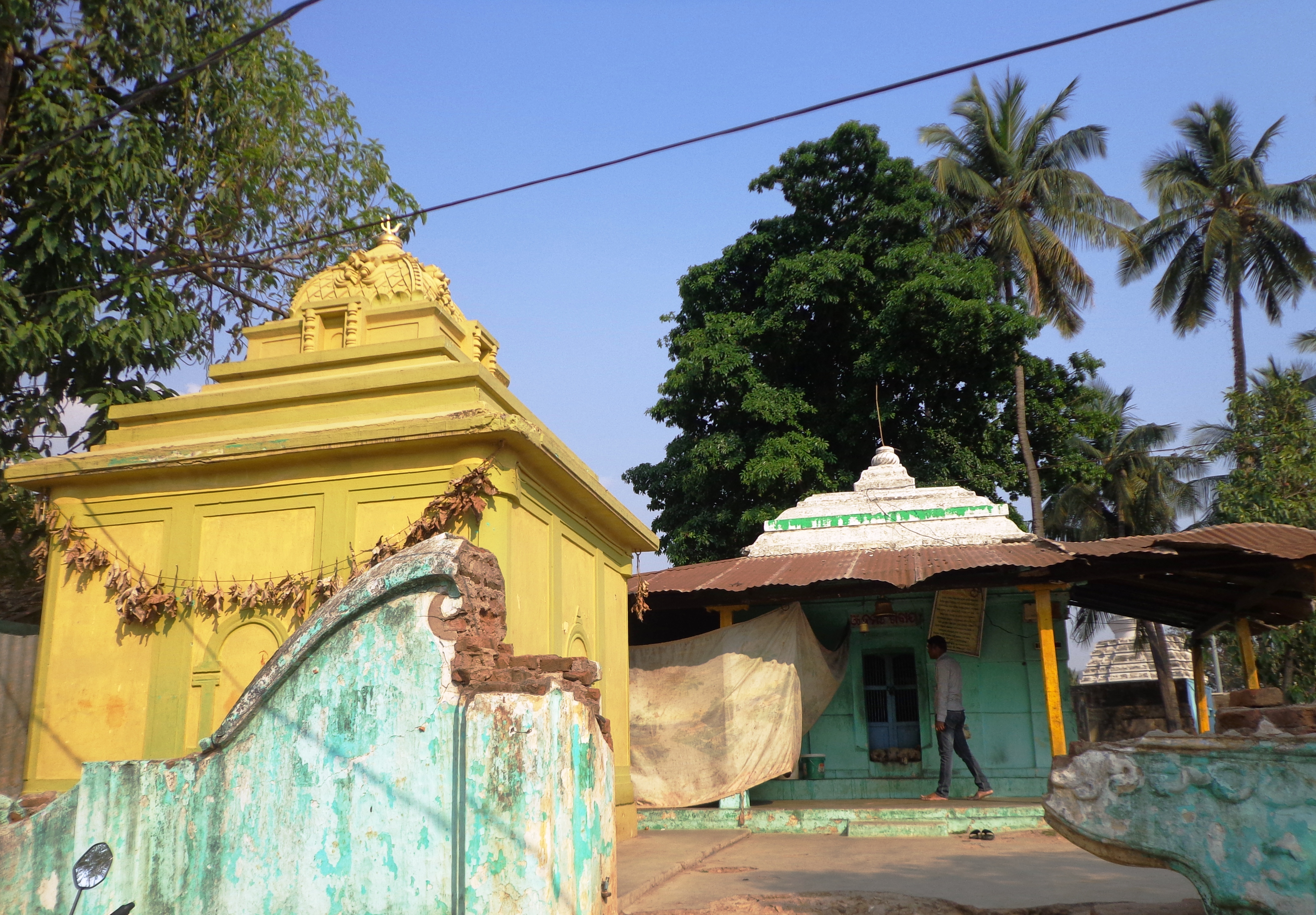
Temples of Lord Shiva & Lord Ganesh at Rayagada

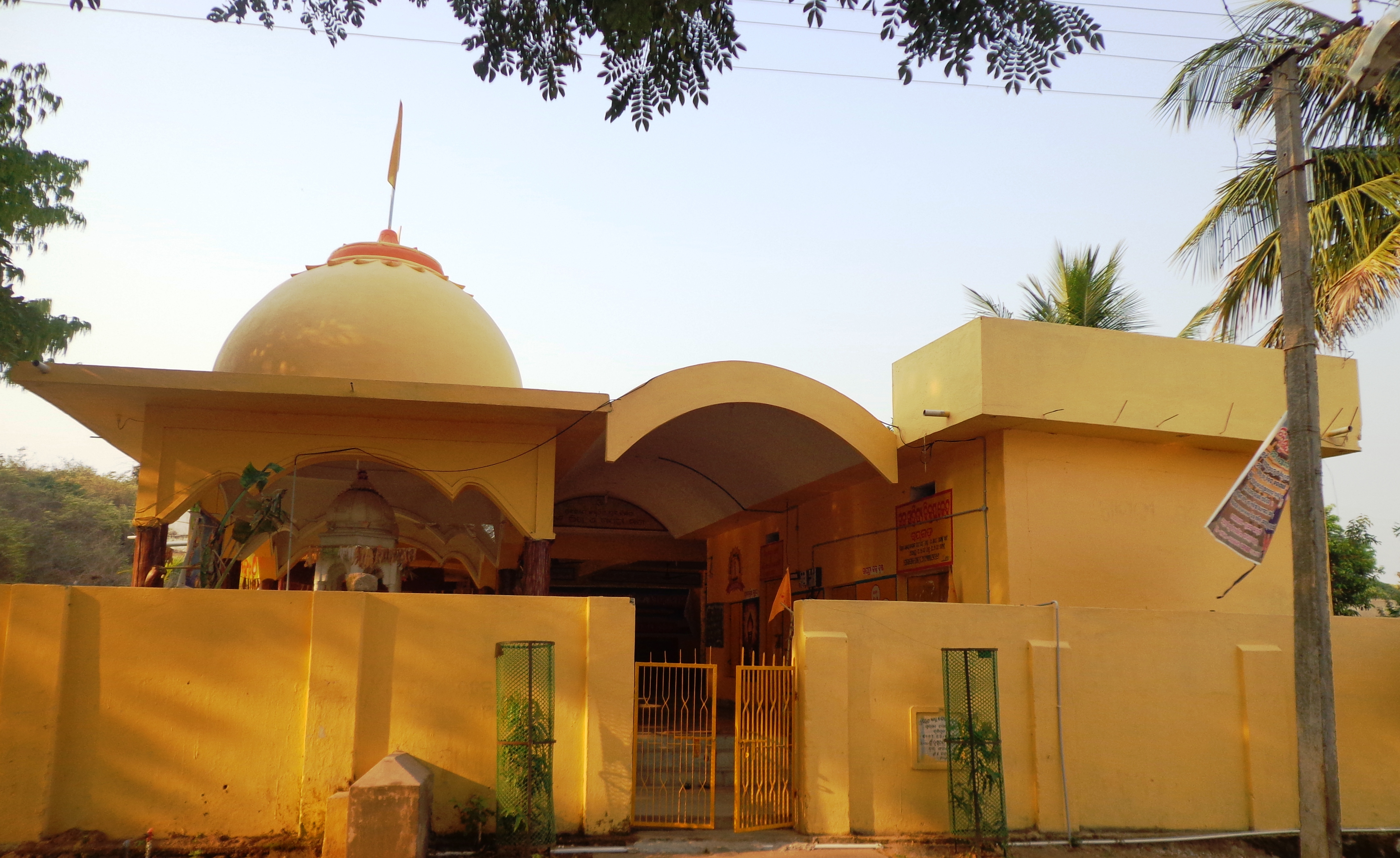
Gayatri Temple at Rayagada

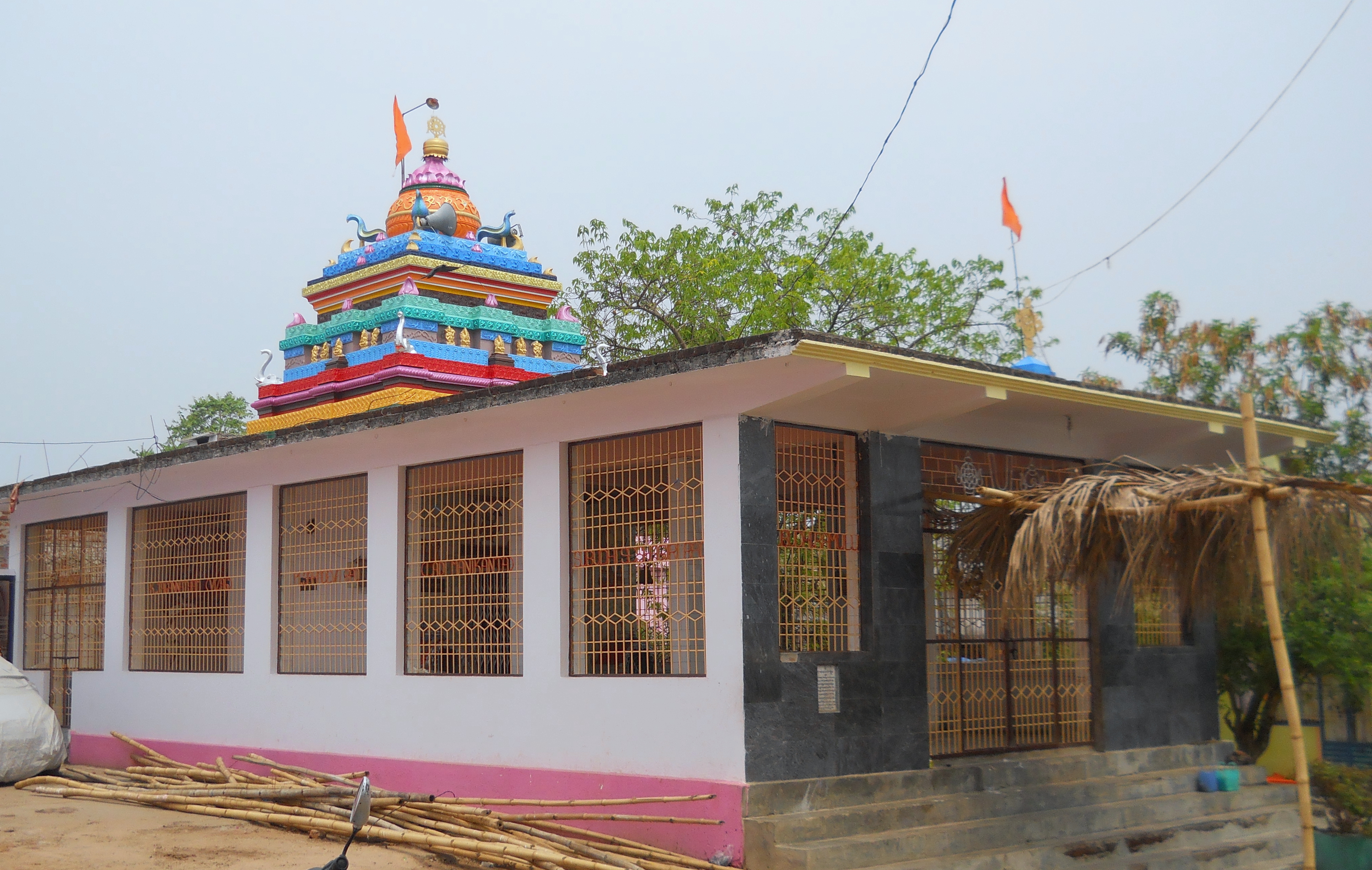
Rama Temple, Gunupur

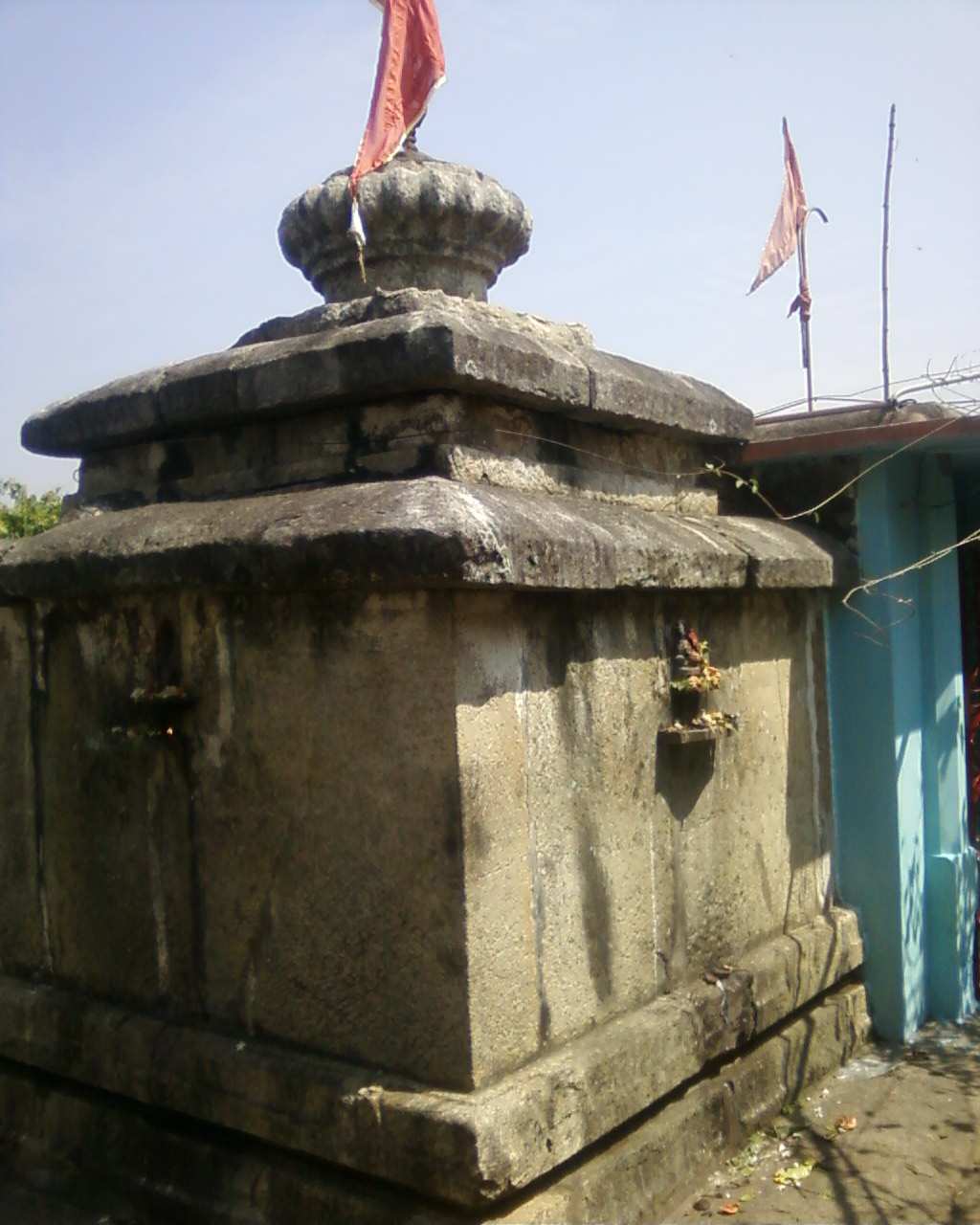
Nilakantheswar temple

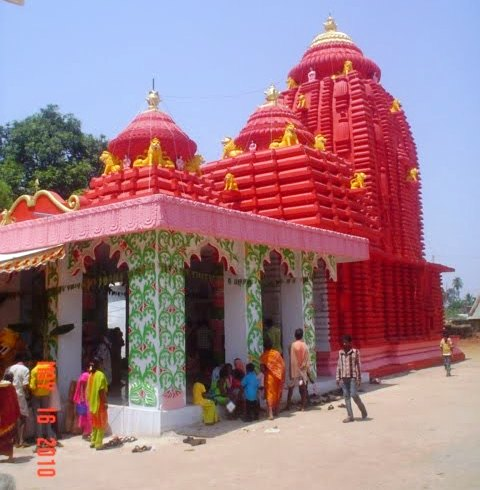
Maa Manikeswari Temple, Kashipur

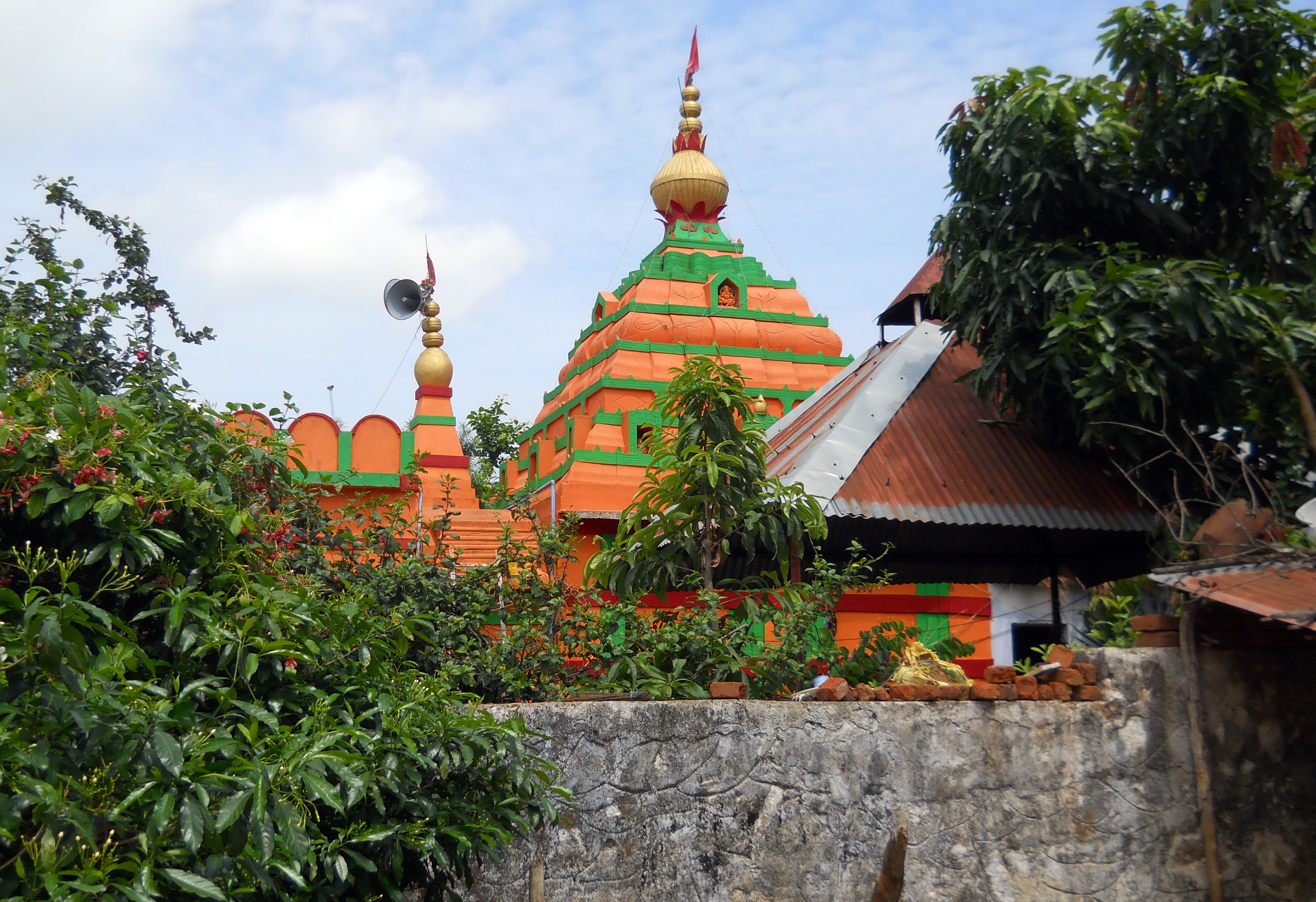
Lord Ganesh Temple, Gunupur

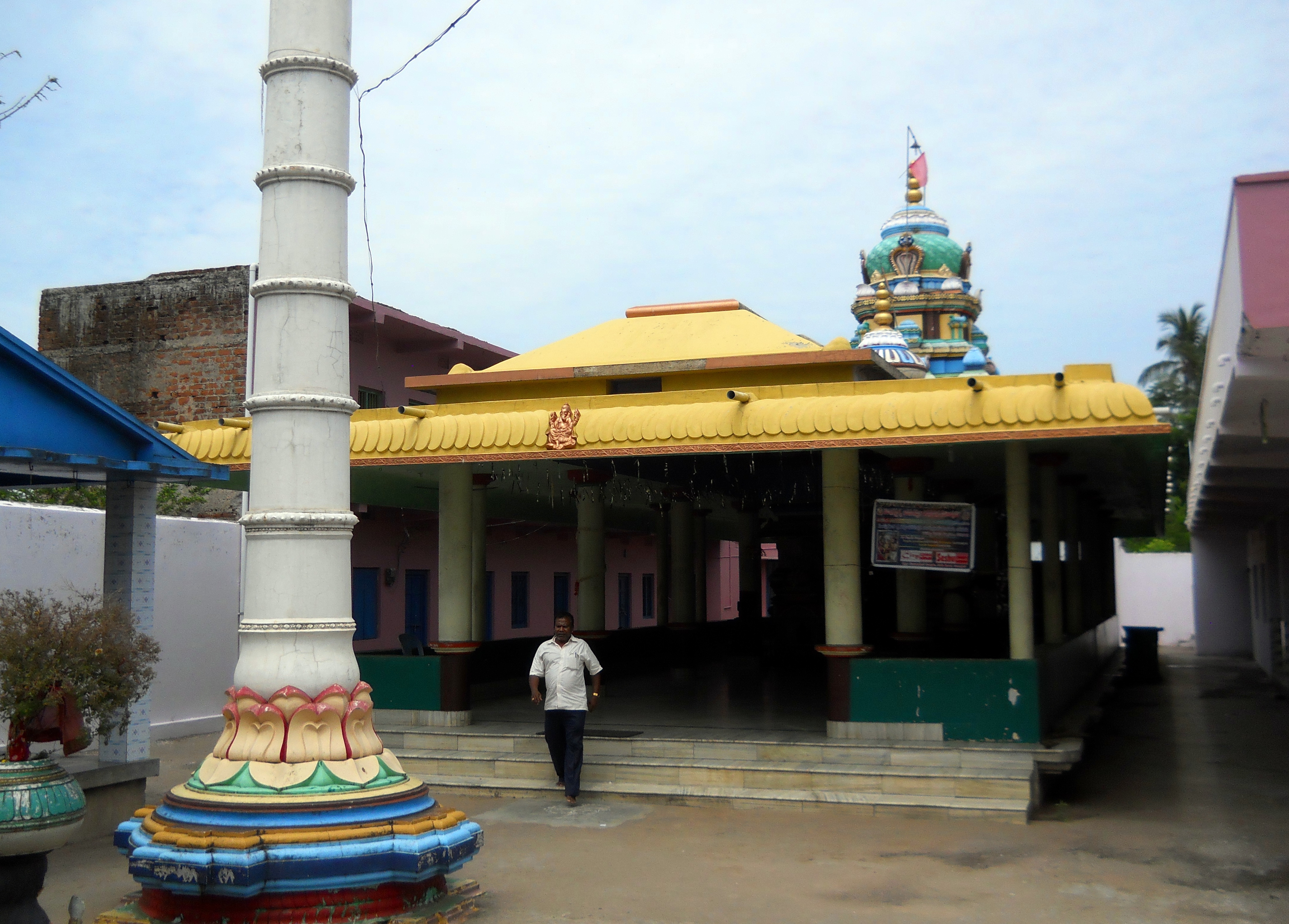
Kanyaka Parameswari Temple, Gunupure

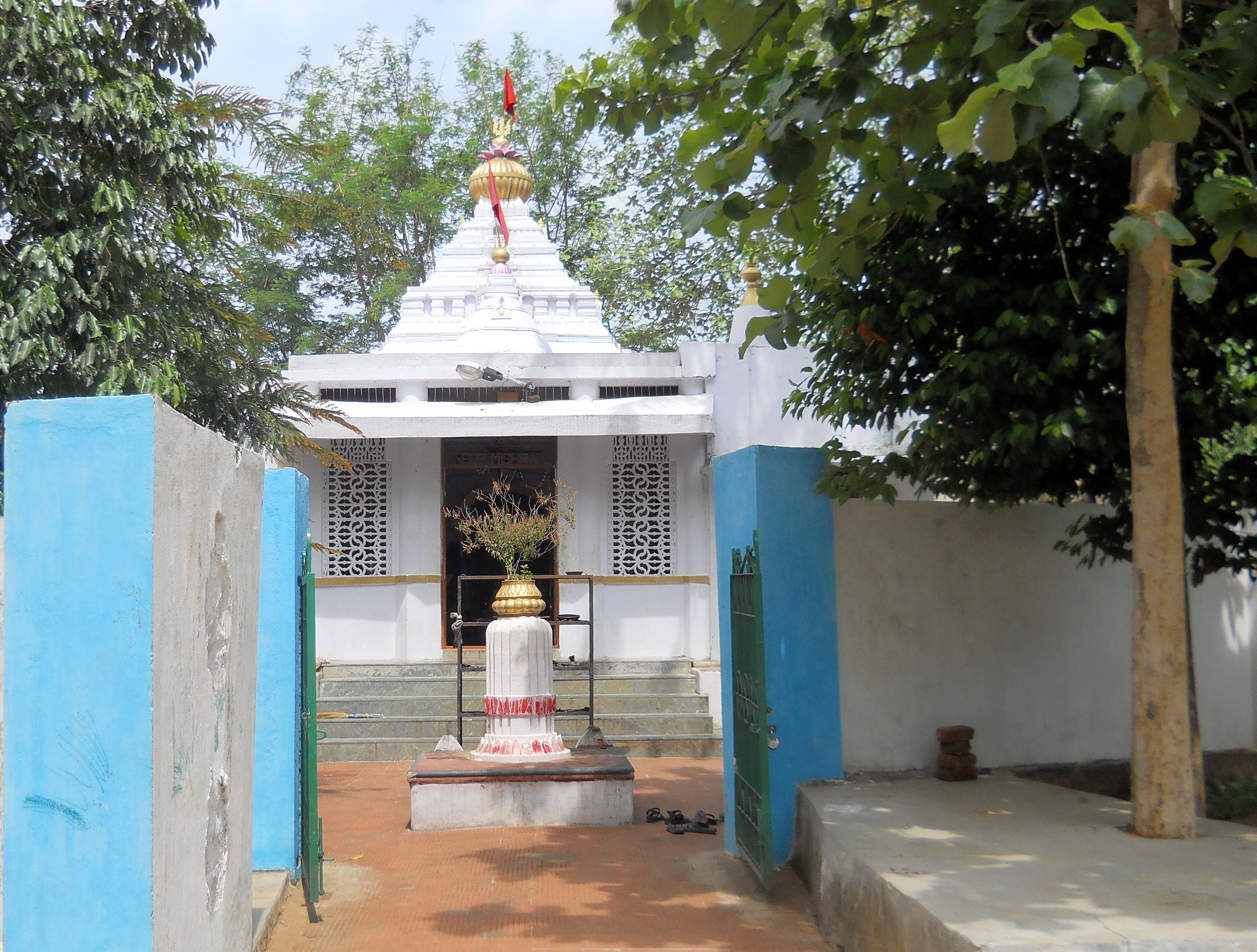
Shiva Temple, Gunupur

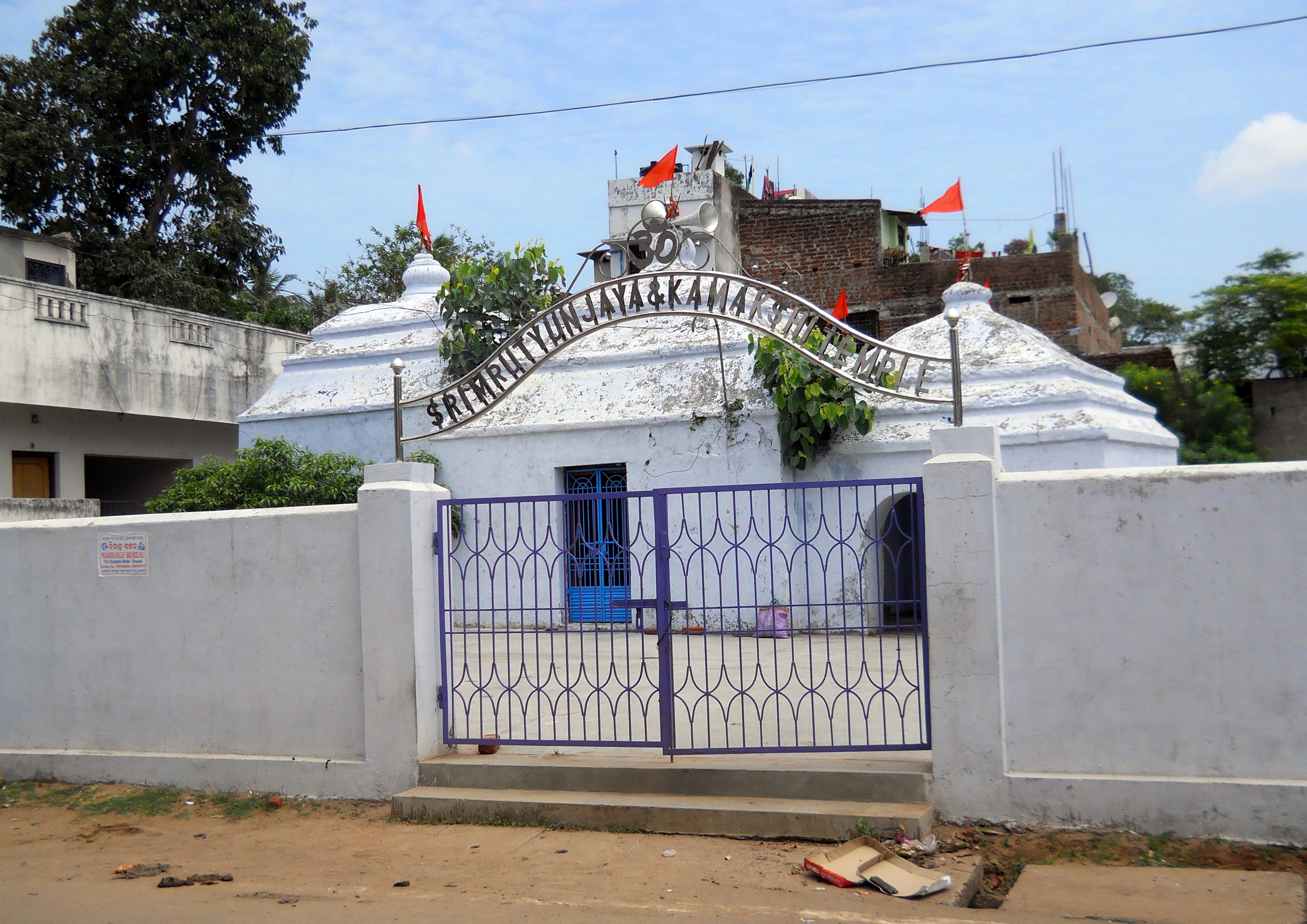
Sri Mrutyunjaya & Kamakshi Temple, Gunupur

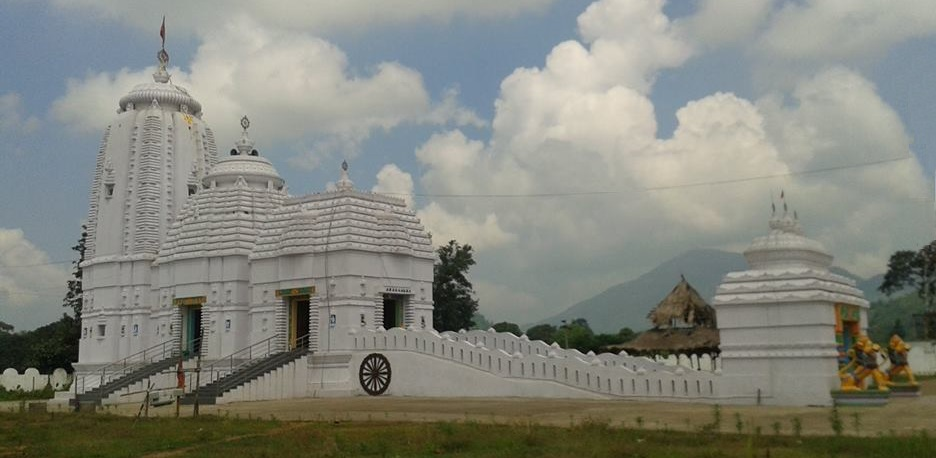
Jagannath Temple of Durgi

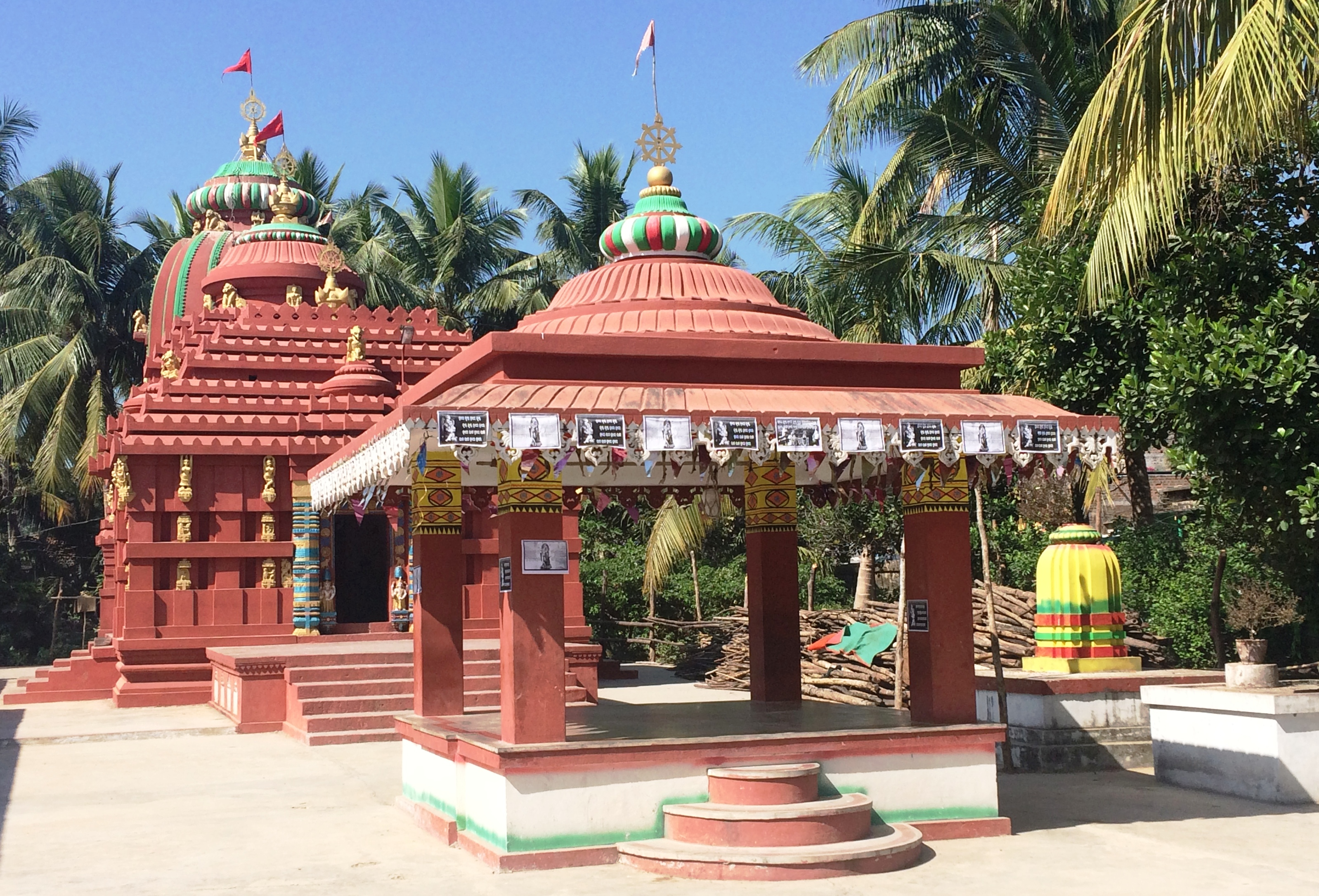
Radhakrushna Temple, Padmapur

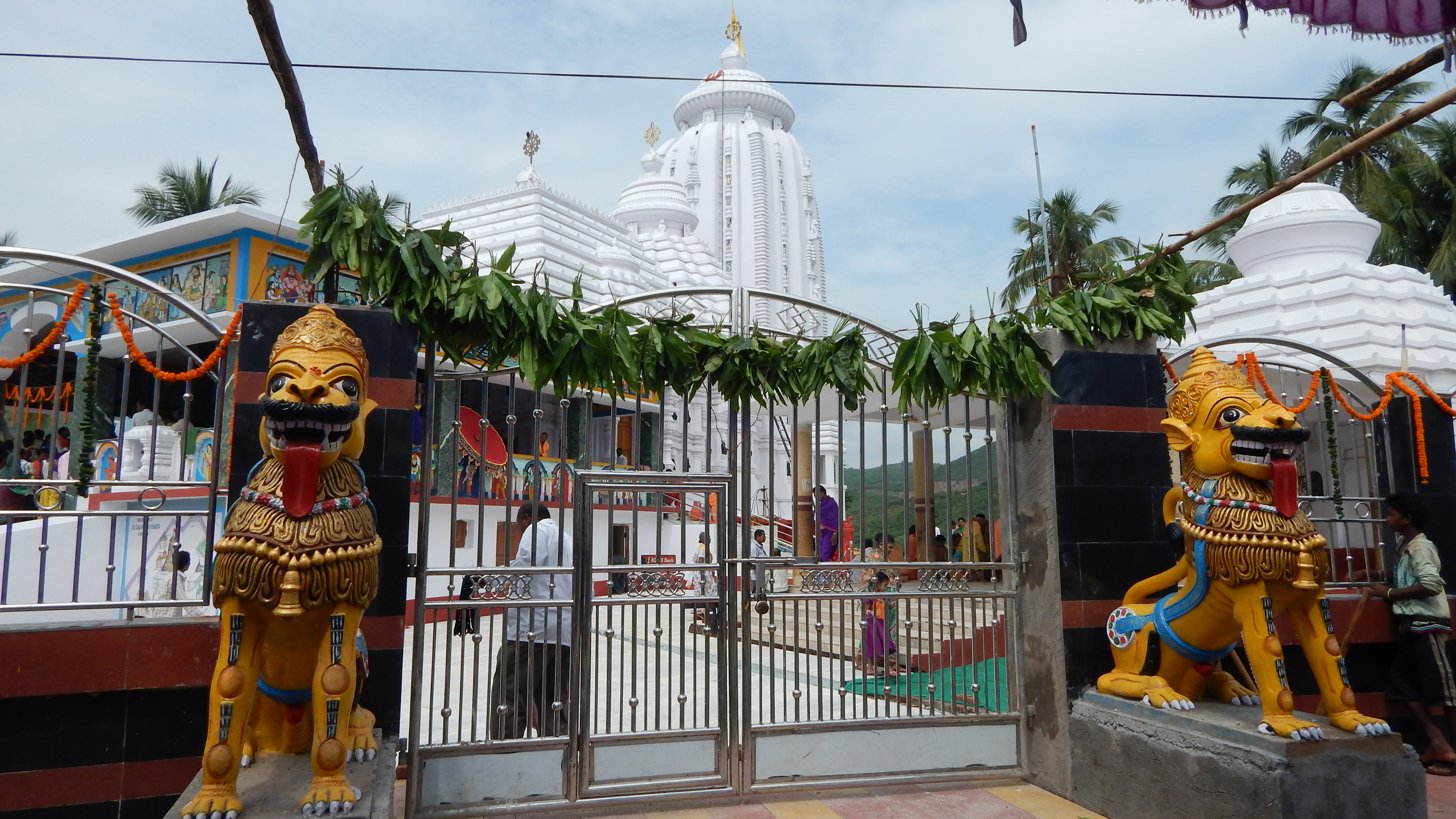
Jagannath Temple at Rayagada

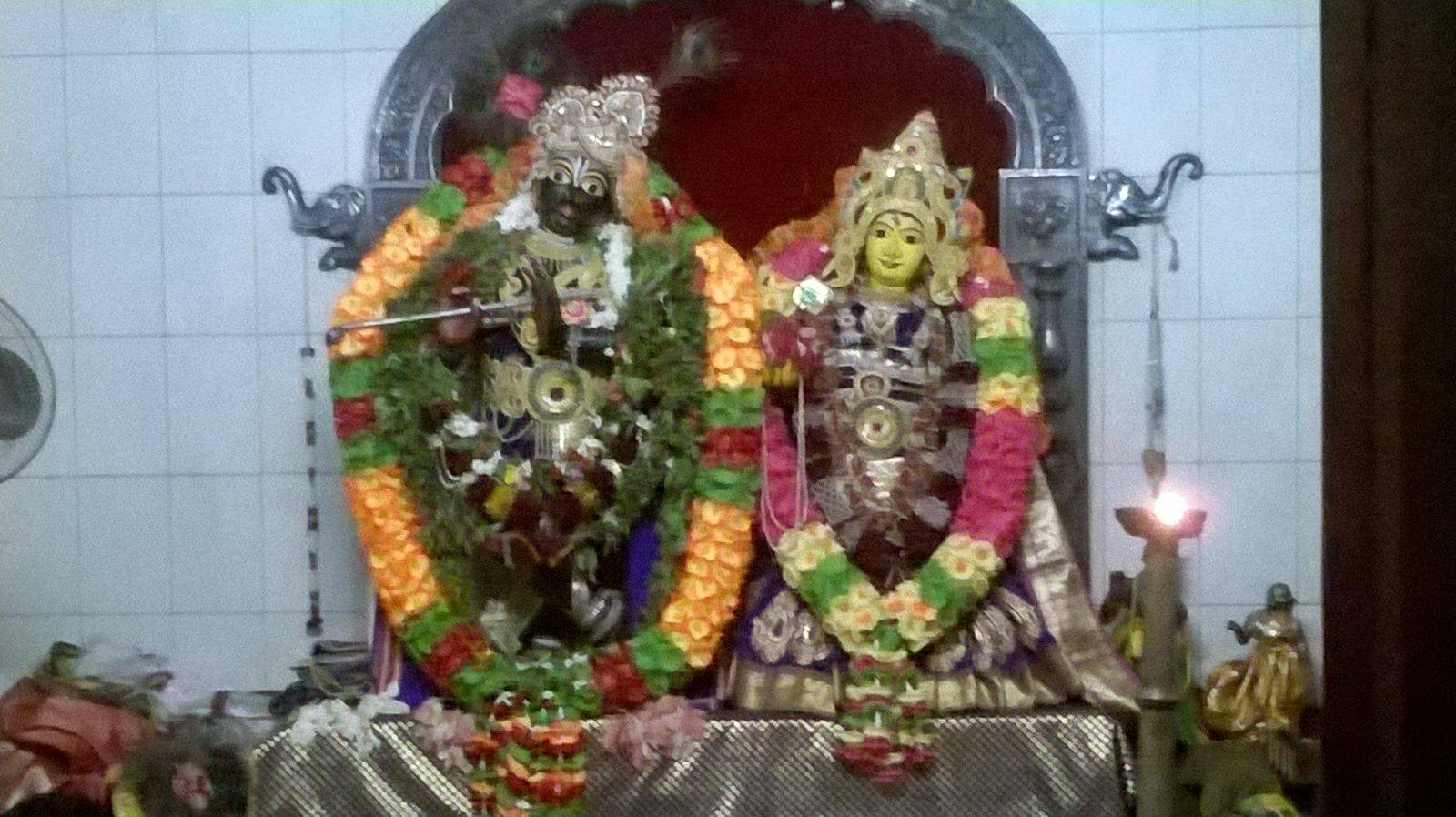
Gopinath Temple, Lihuri, Gunupur

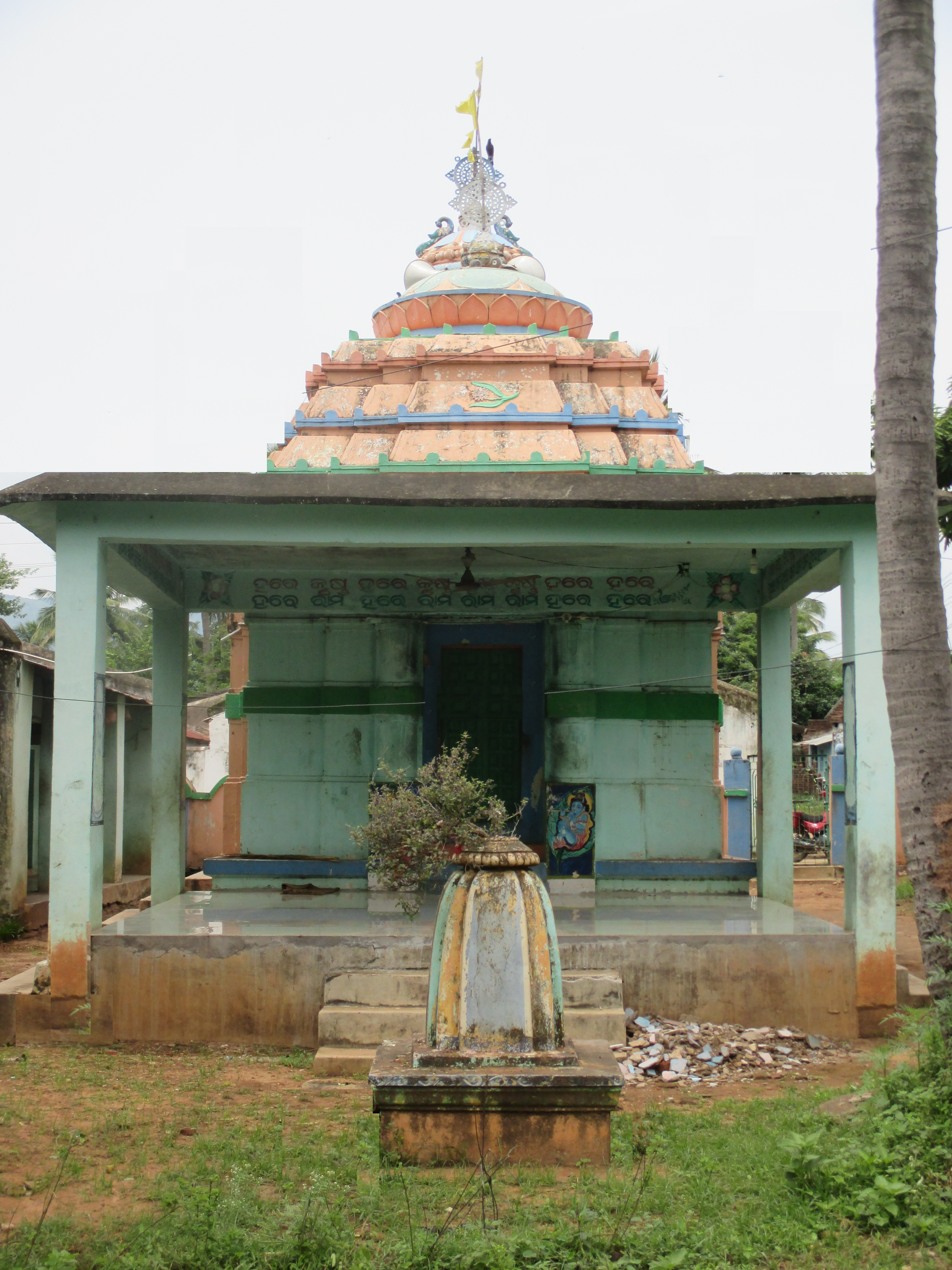
Radha Krishna Temple, Durgi

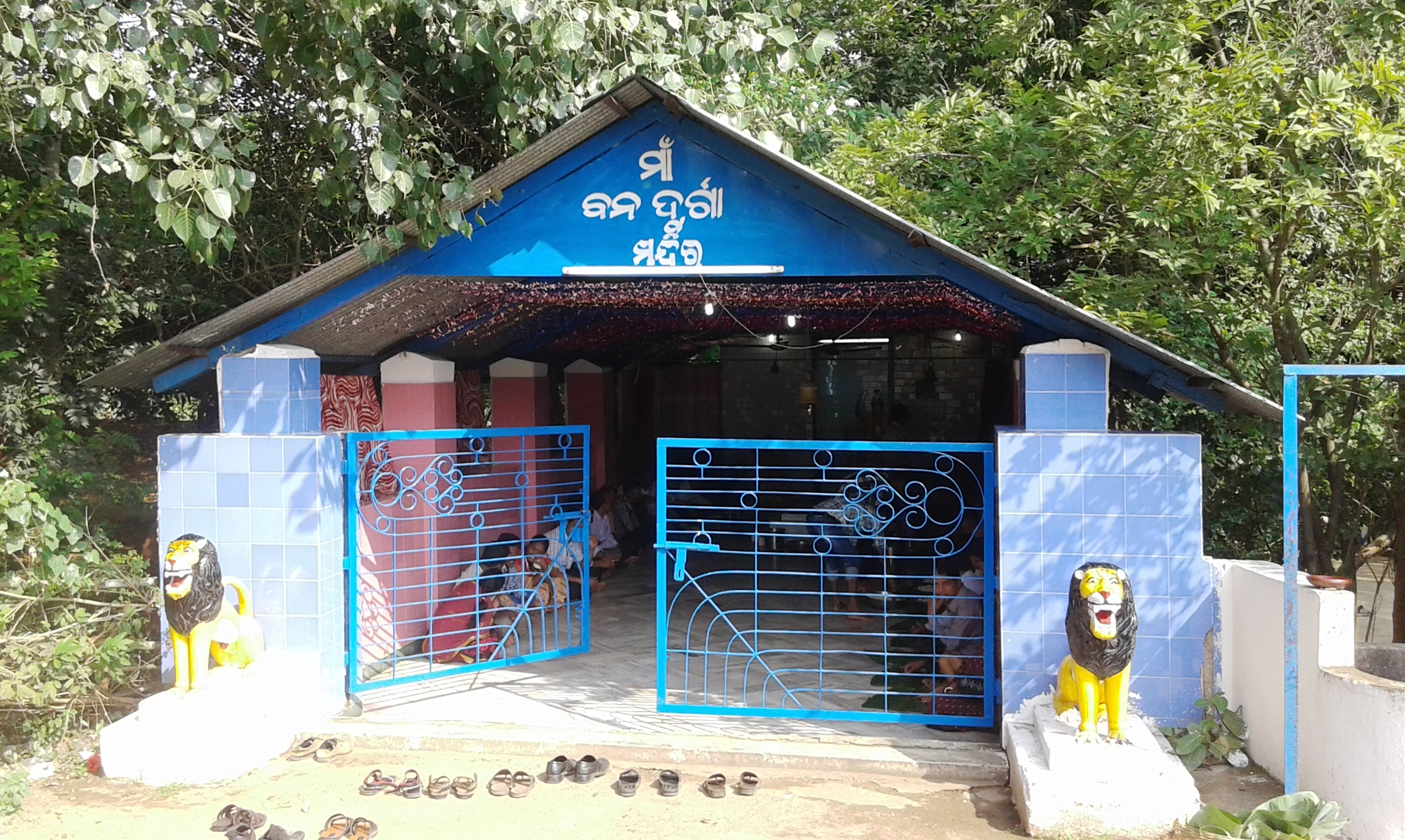
Maa Banadurga Temple, Rayagada

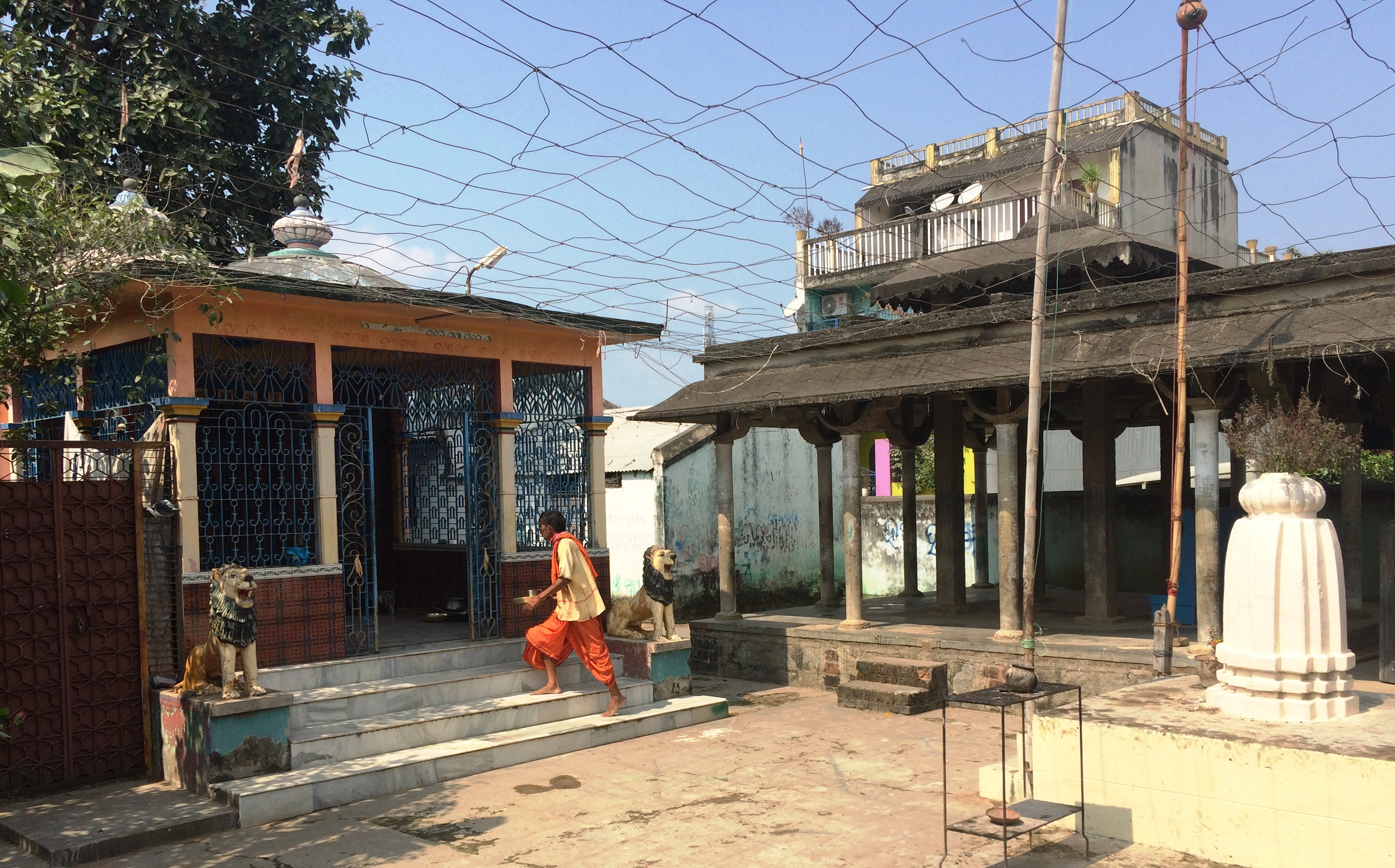
Trinath Temple, Padmapur

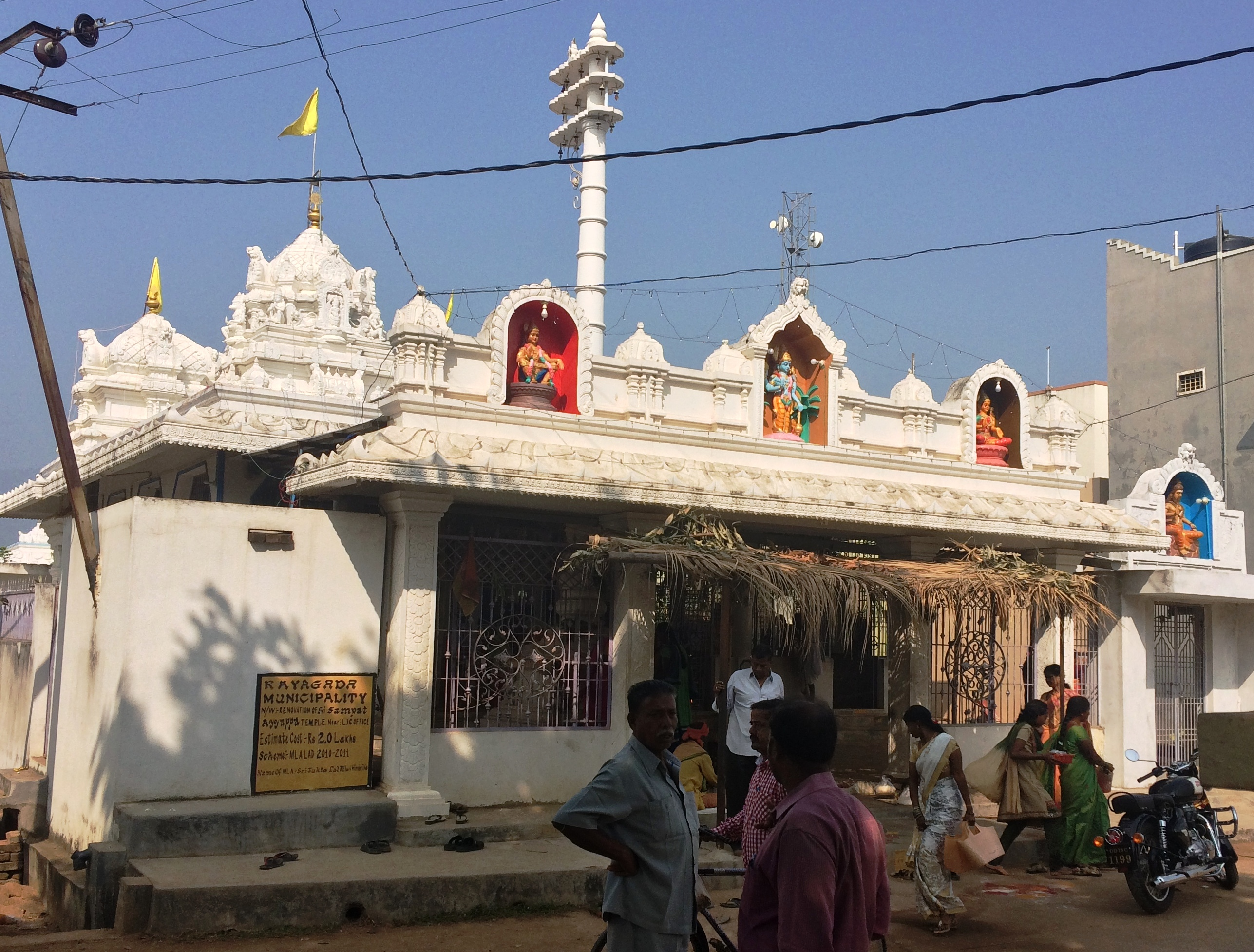
Satya Narayana Swami Temple, Rayagada

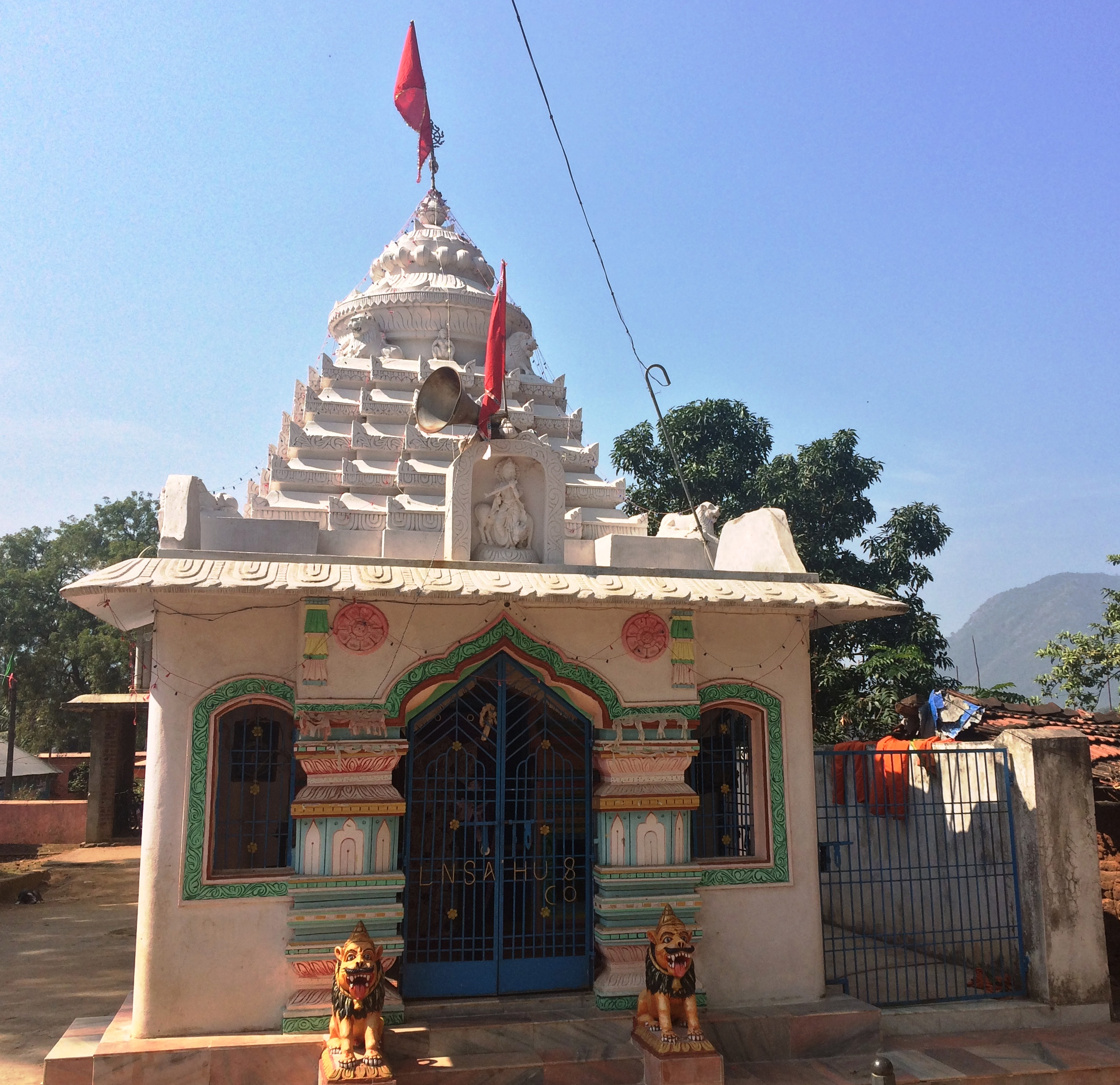
Giri Gobardhan Temple, Rayagada

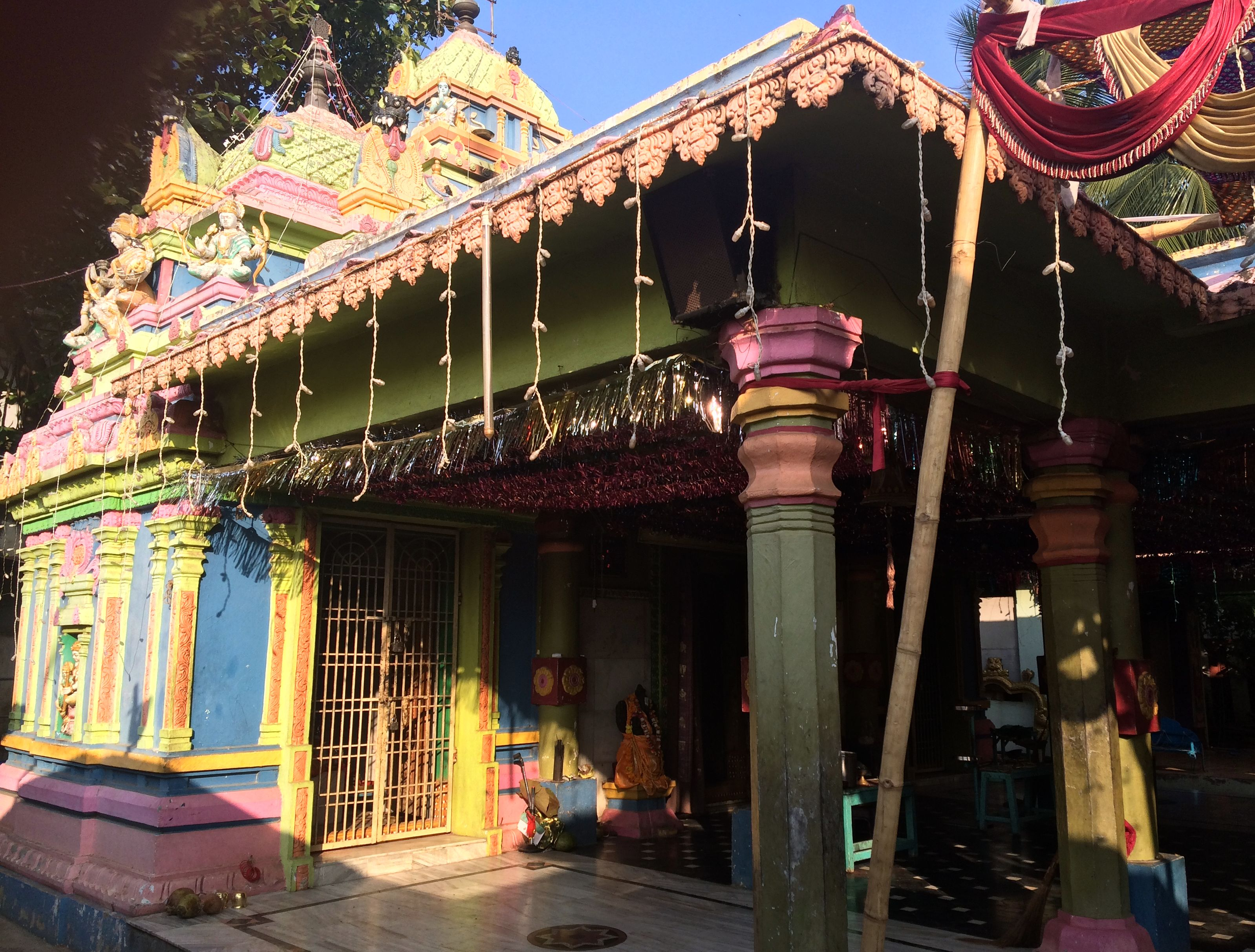
Lord Venketeswara Temple, Rayagada

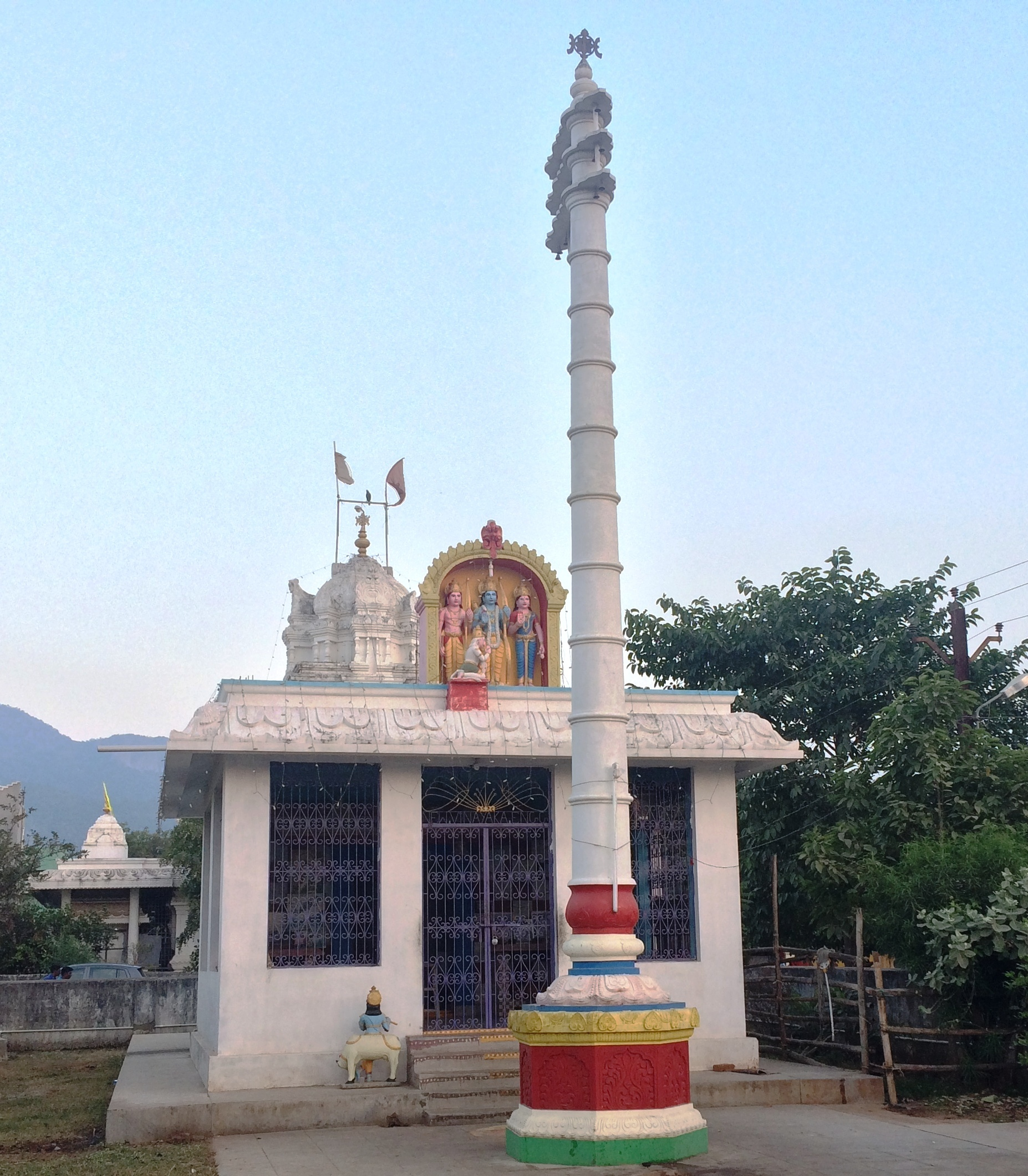
Lord Rama Temple, Rayagada(Kasturi Nagara)

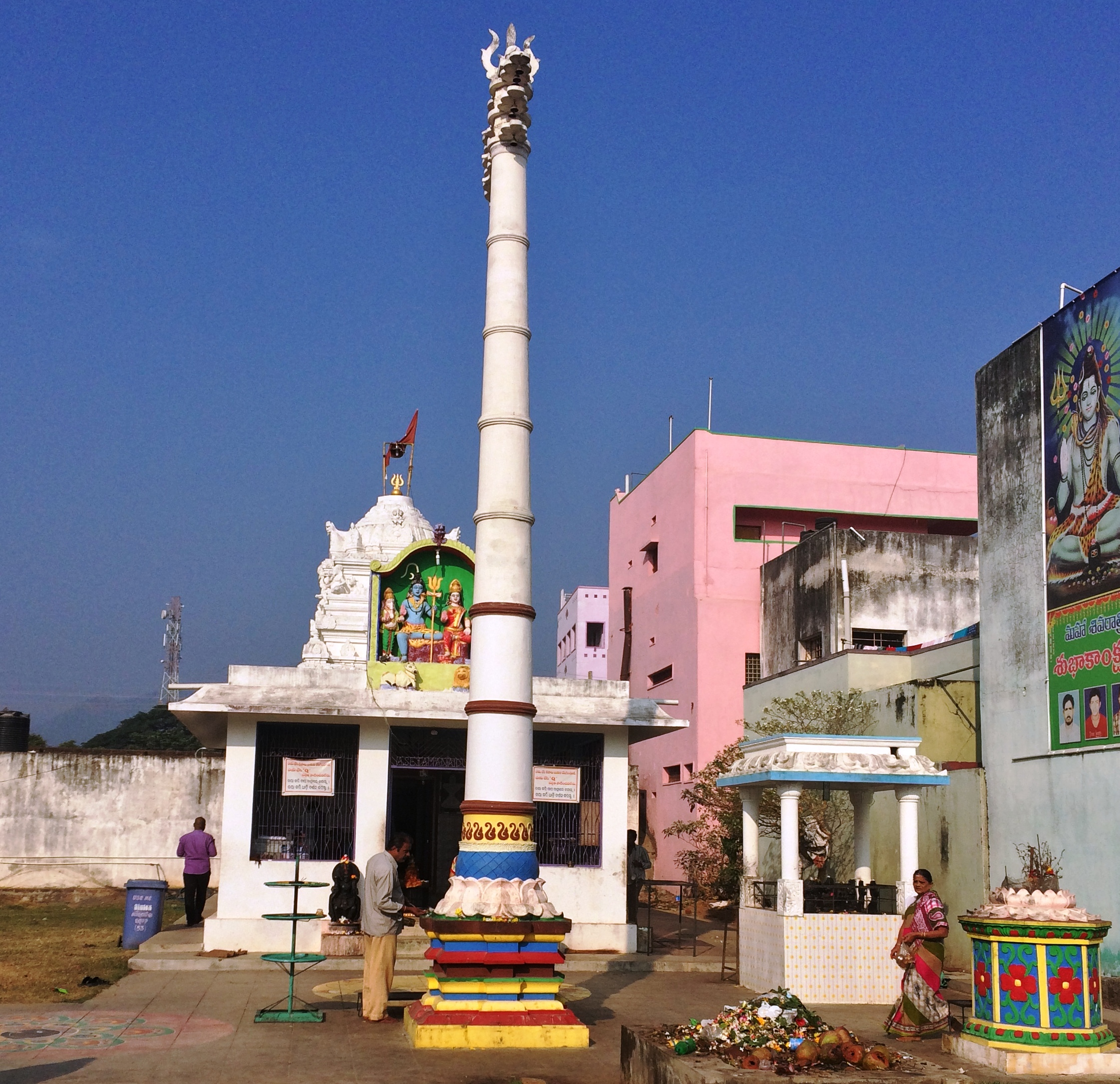
Shiva Temple, Rayagada(Kasturi Nagara)

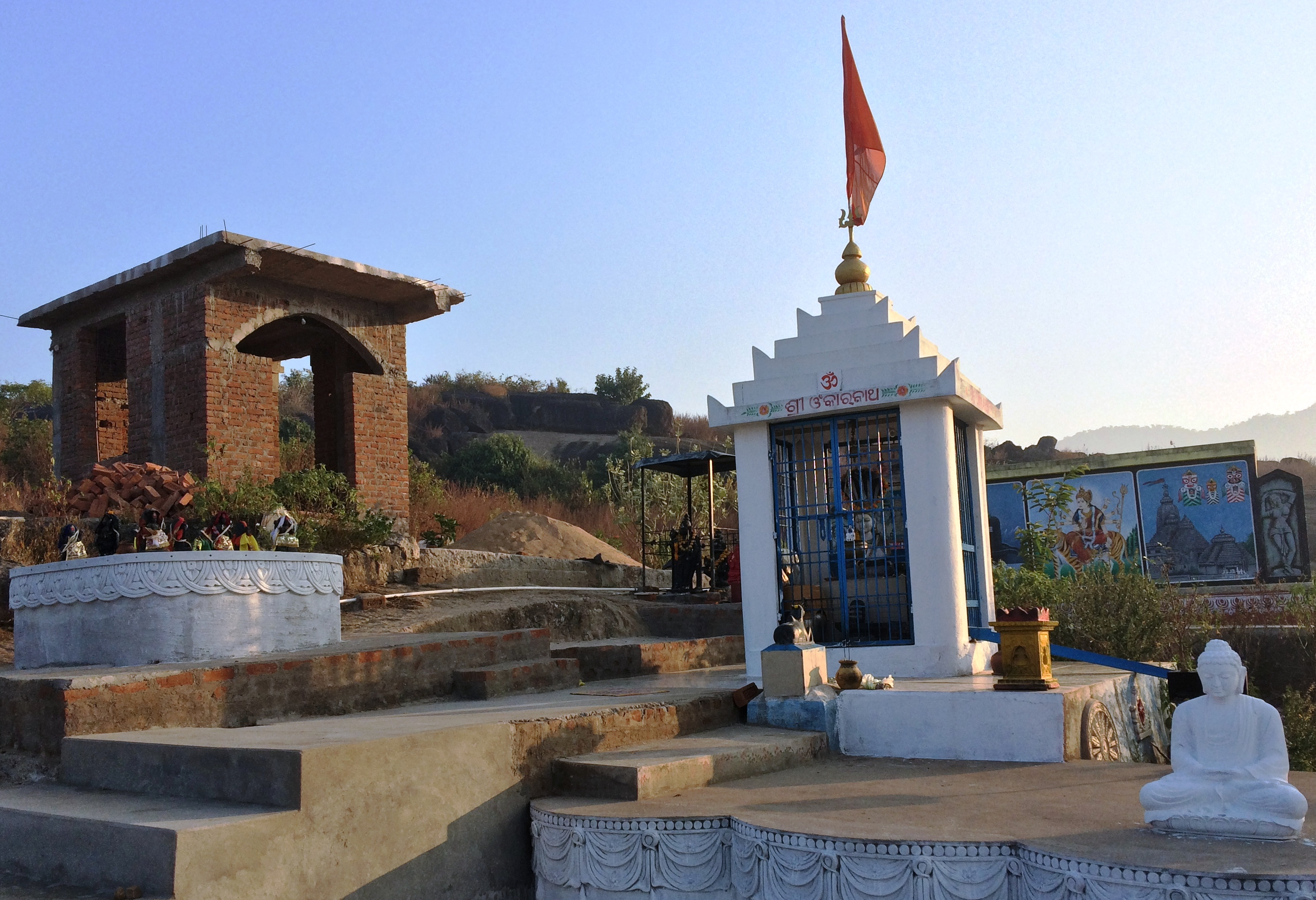
Omkarnath Temple, Rayagada

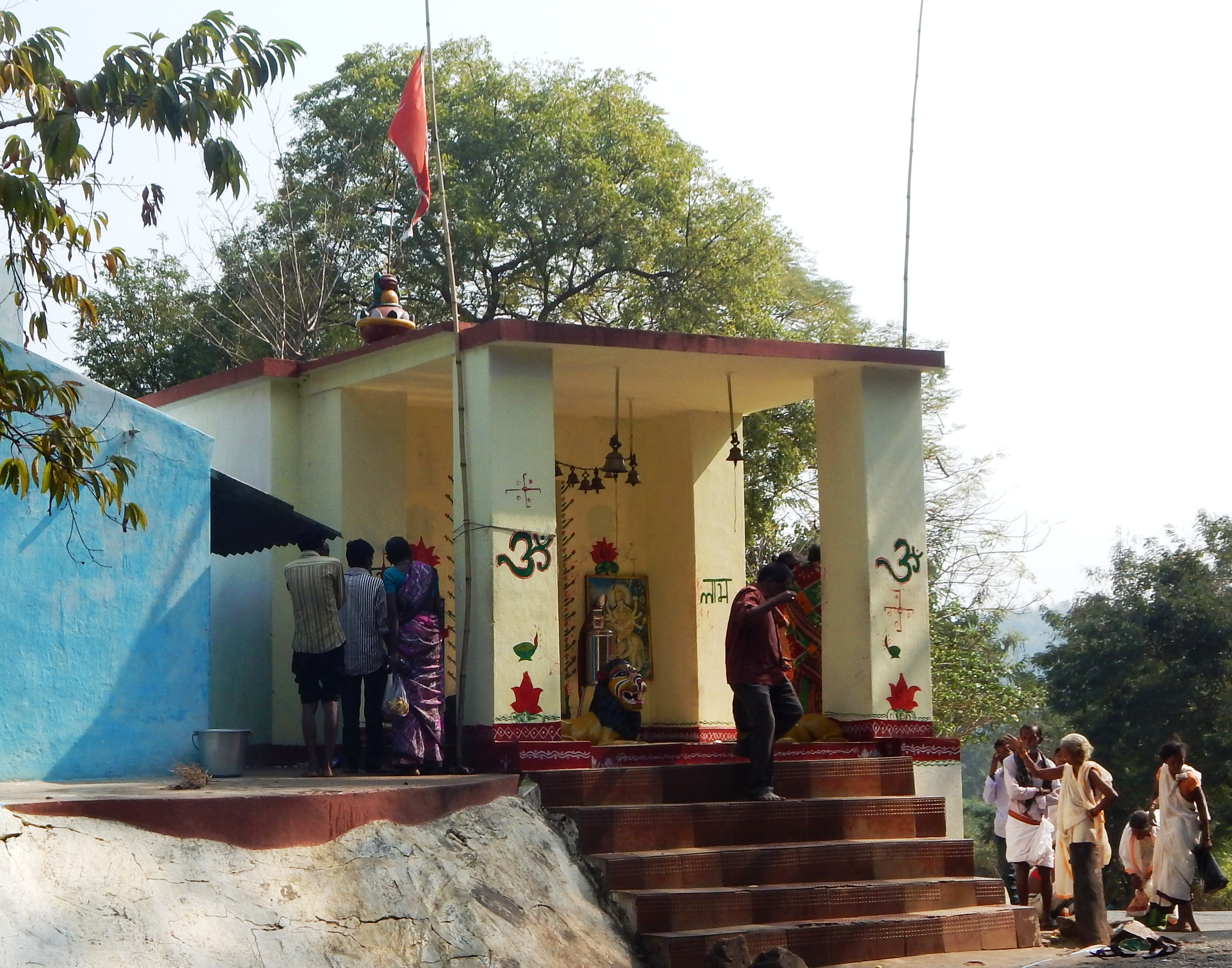
Sankeswari Temple, Sankesh

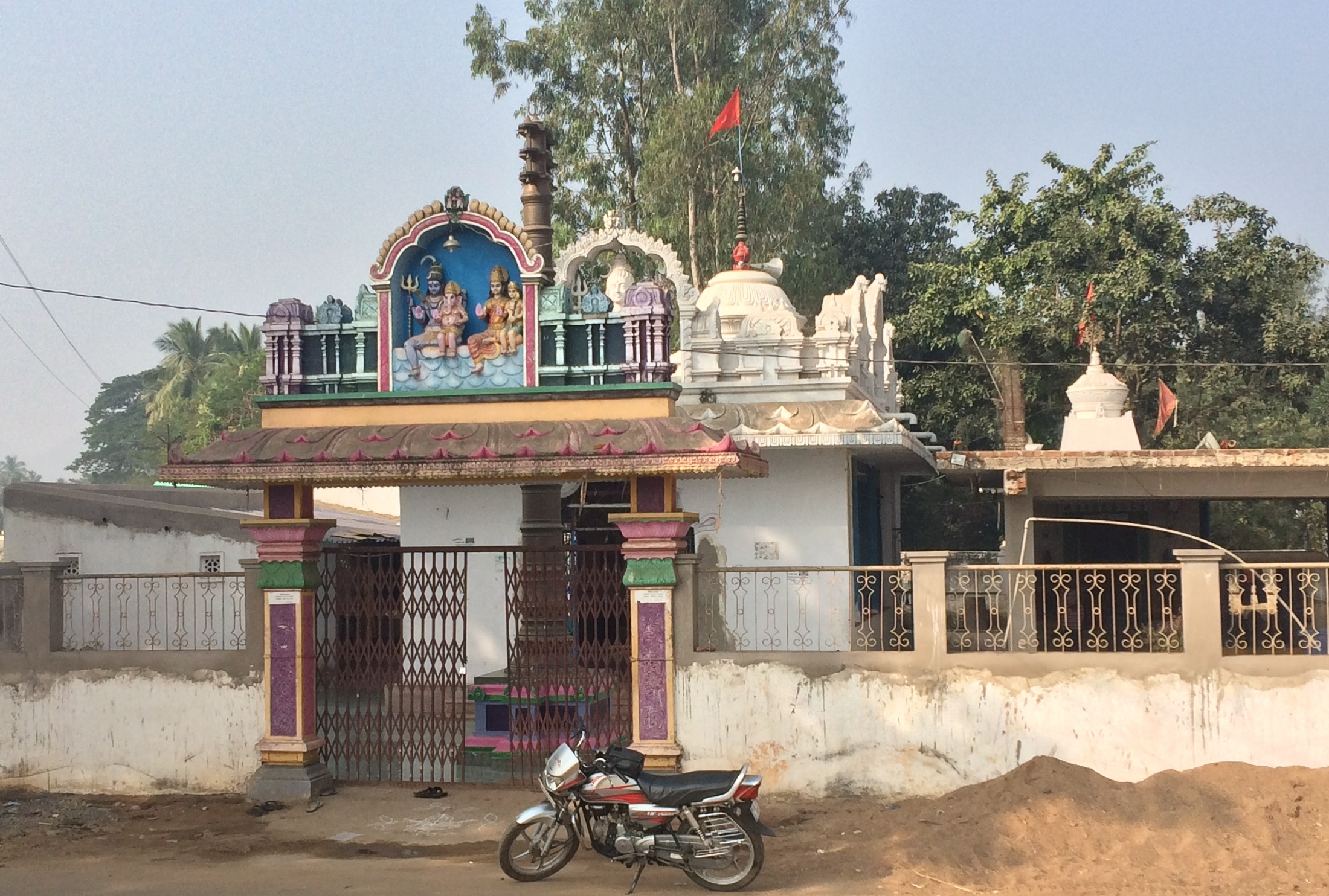
Shiv Temple at Rohita Colony, Rayagada

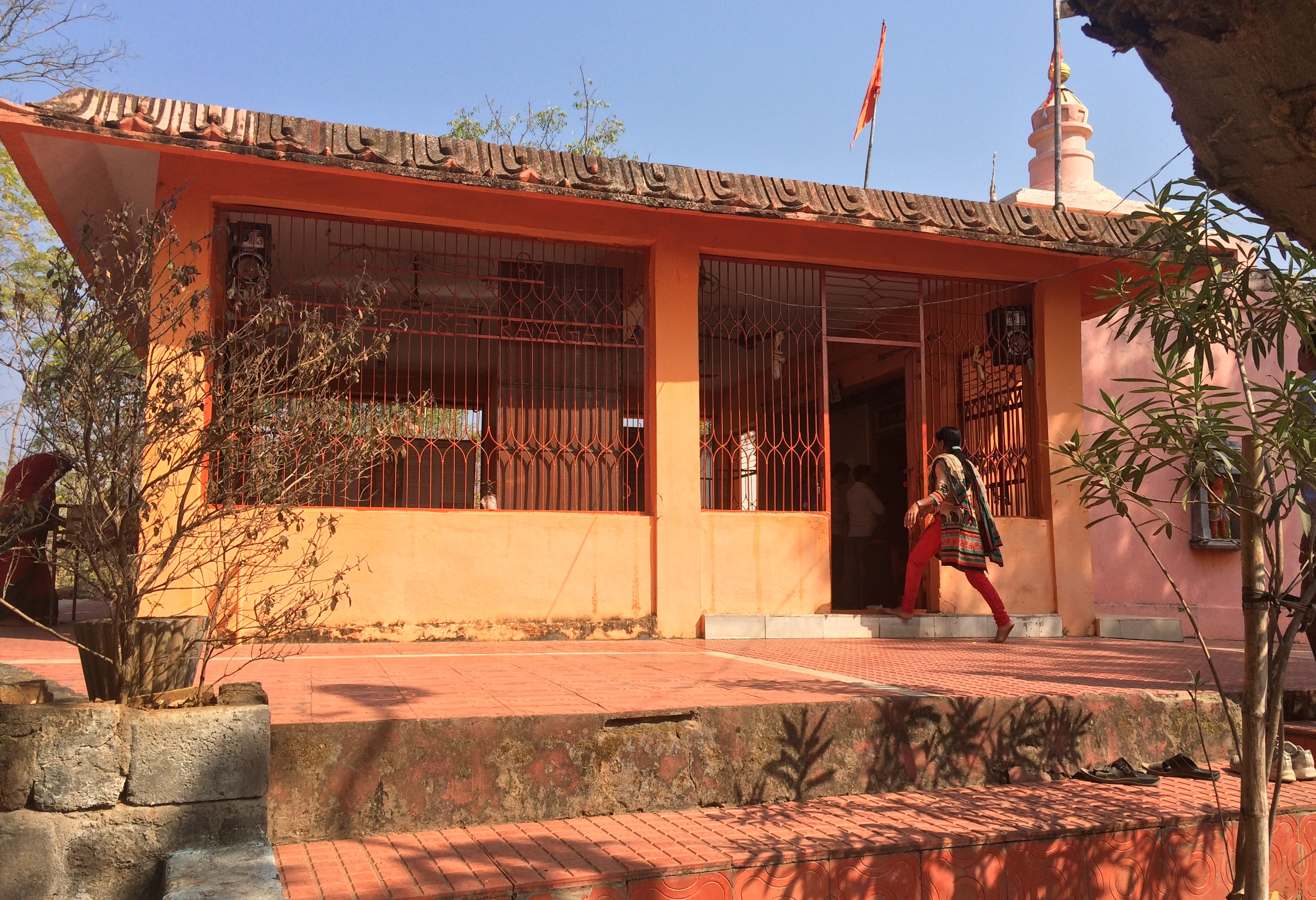
Hanumana Temple, Rayagada

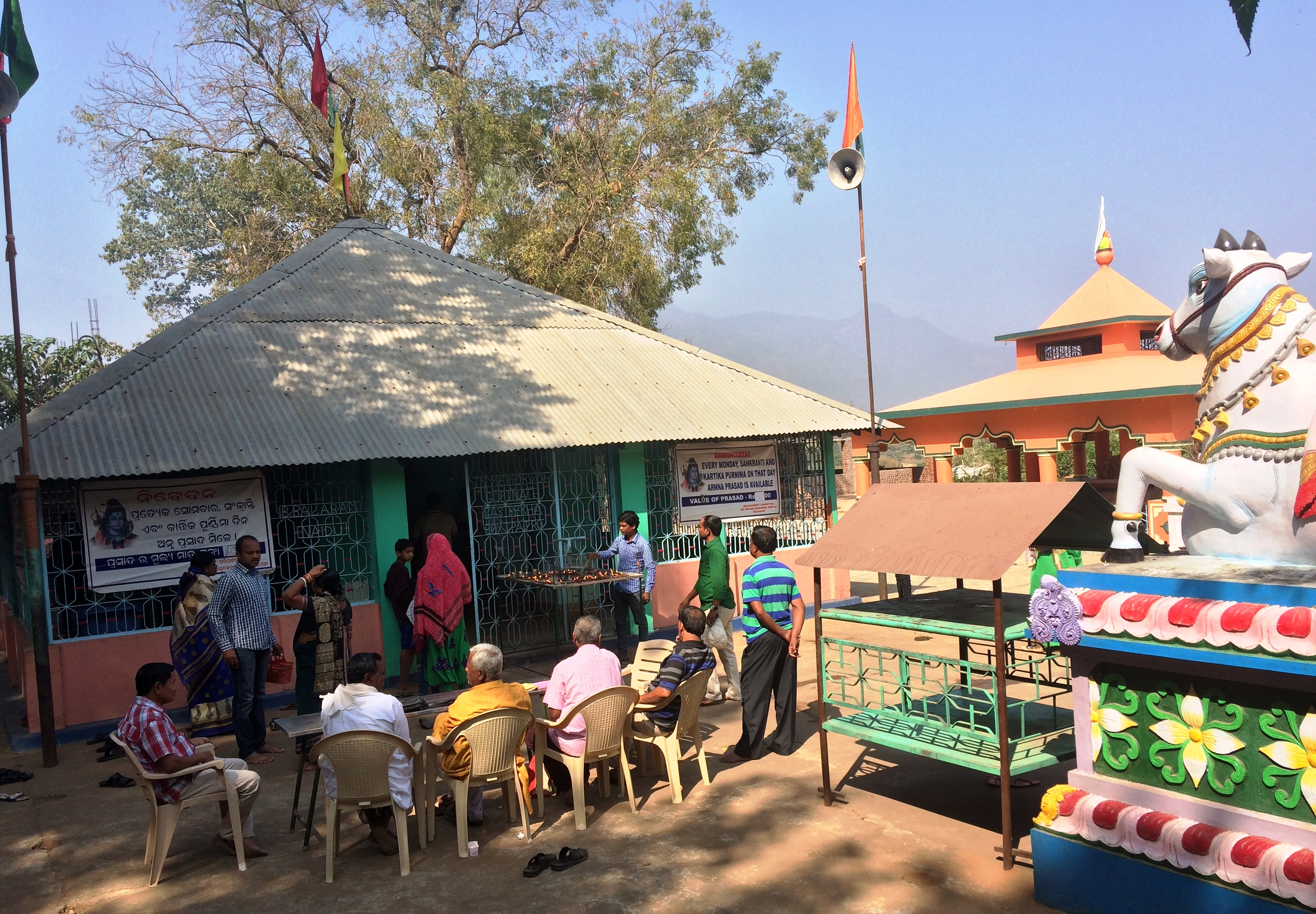
Balunkeswar Temple, Rayagada

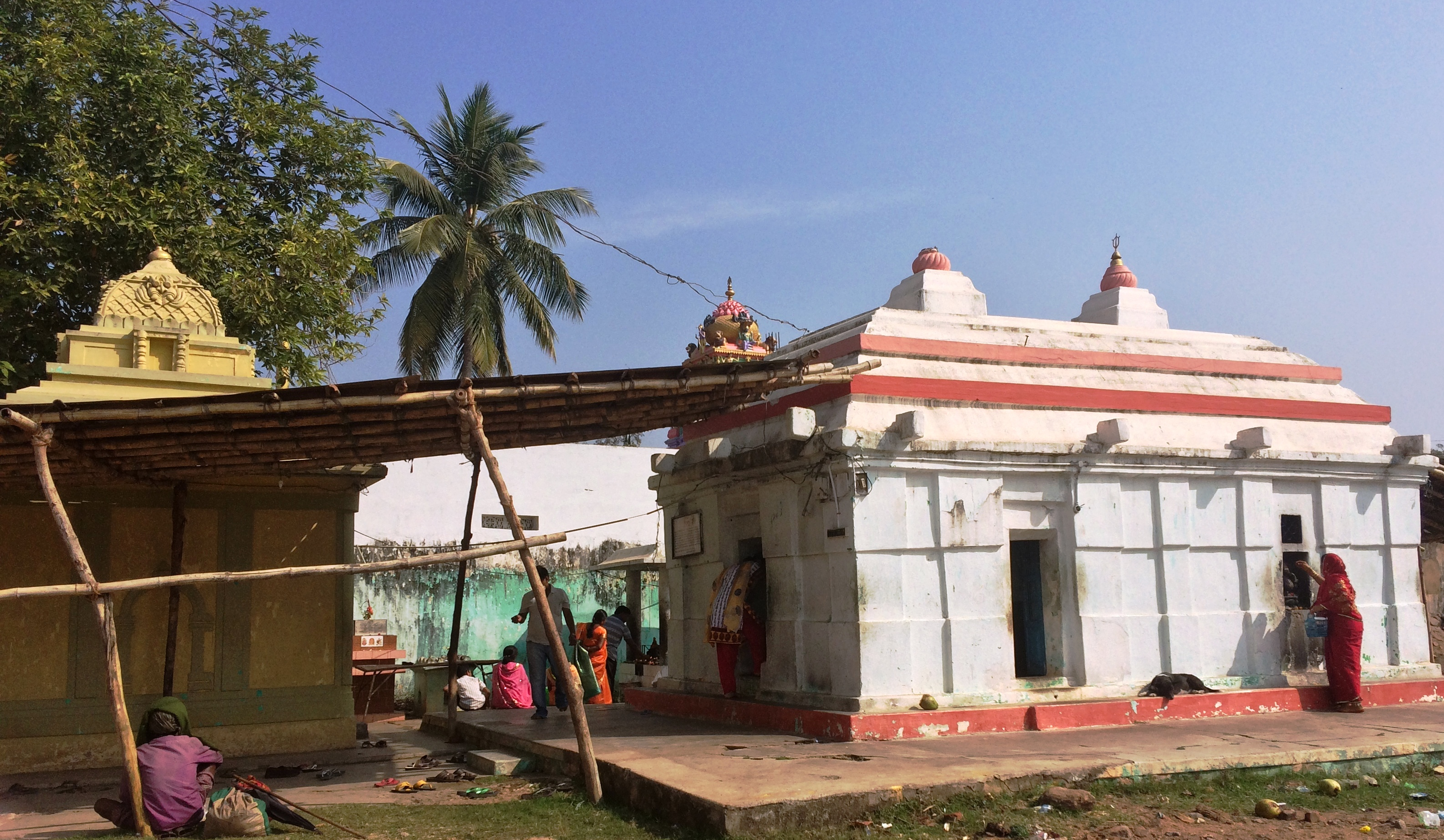
Shiv(Mallikeswar) Temple, near Nadi sahi, Rayagada

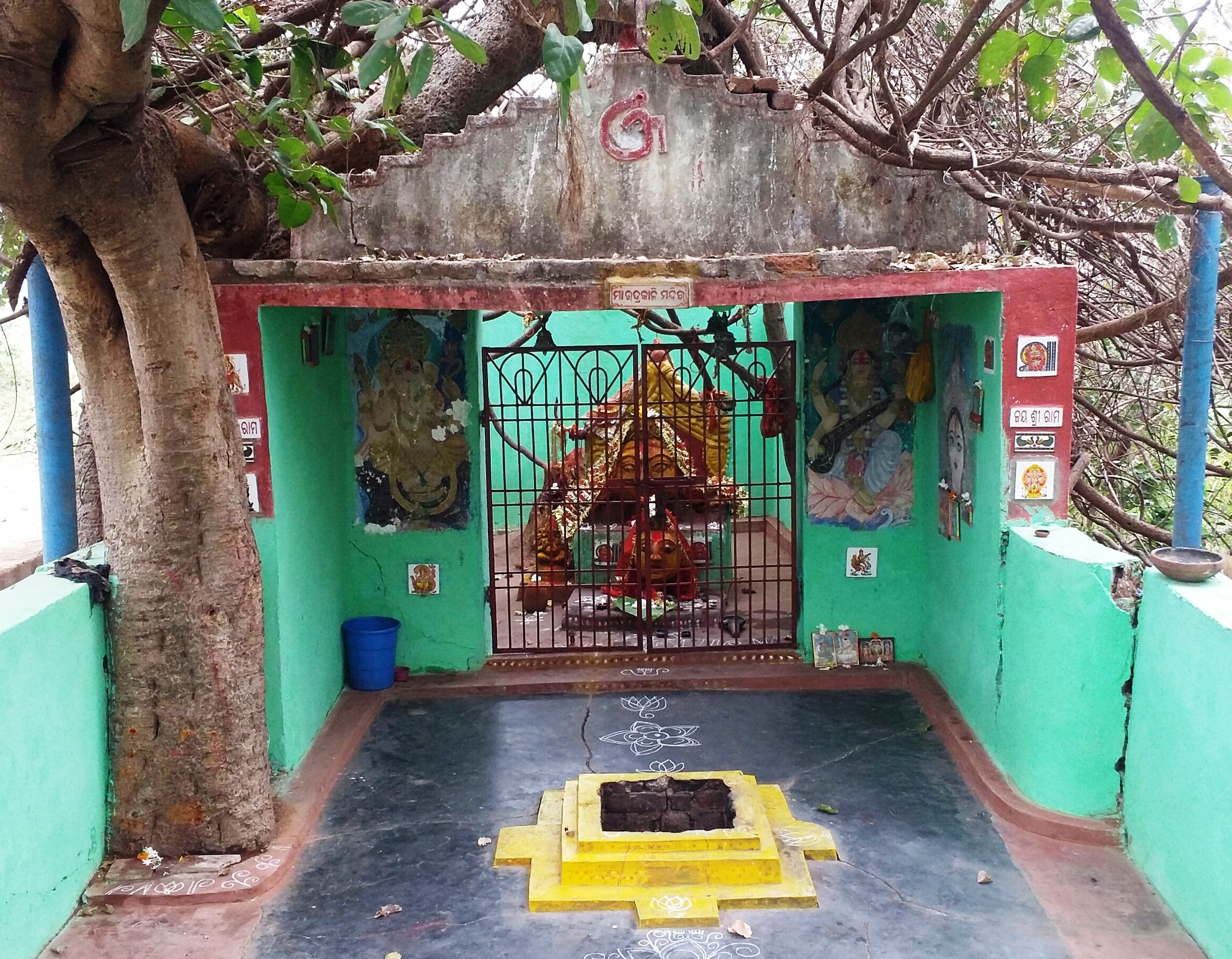
Maa Bhadra Kali Temple, Rayagada

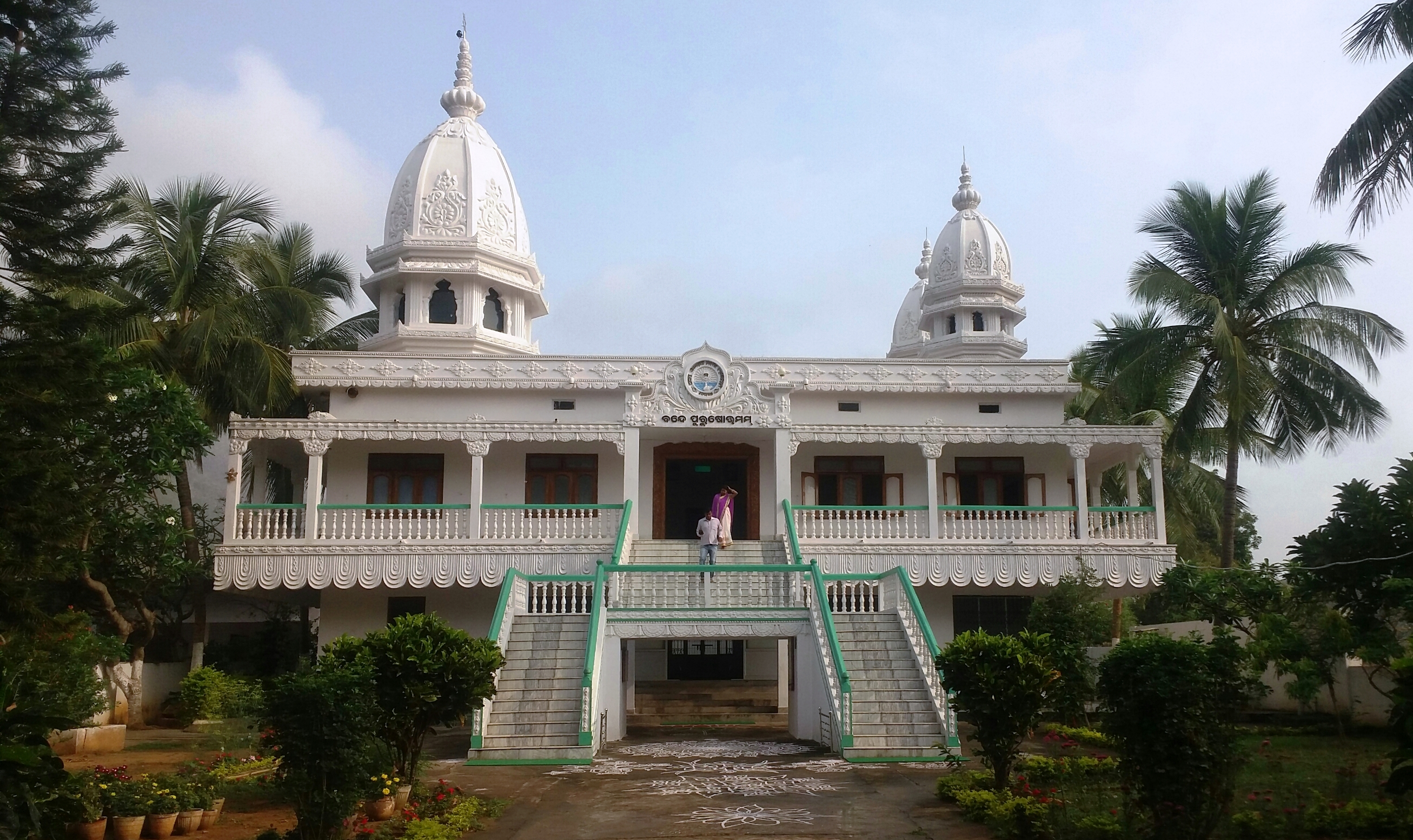
Satsang Vihar, Rayagada

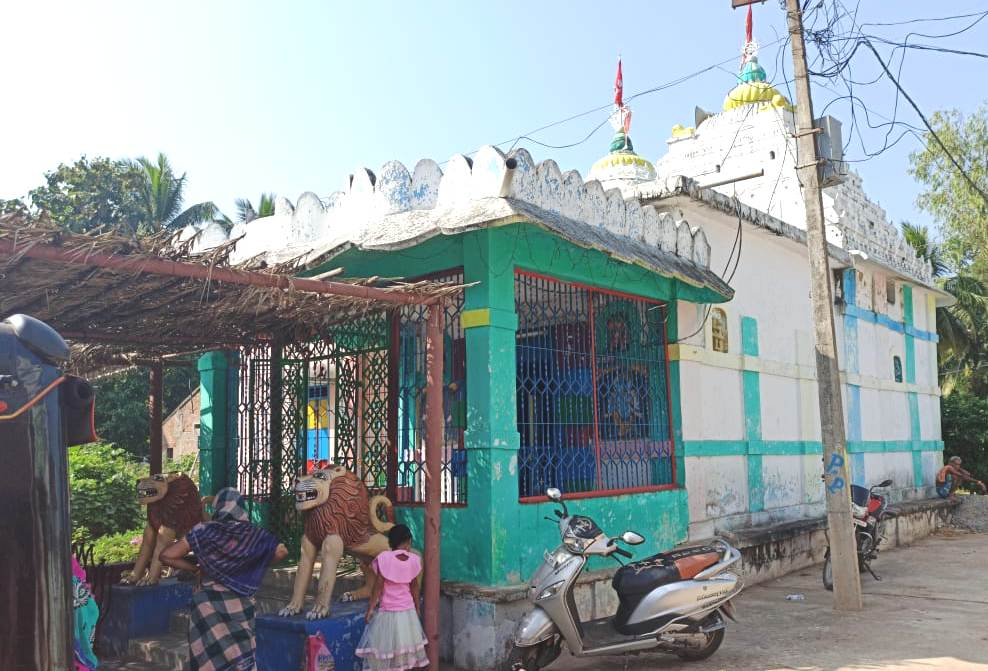
Radhakrishna Temple at Bhaleri near Gunupur

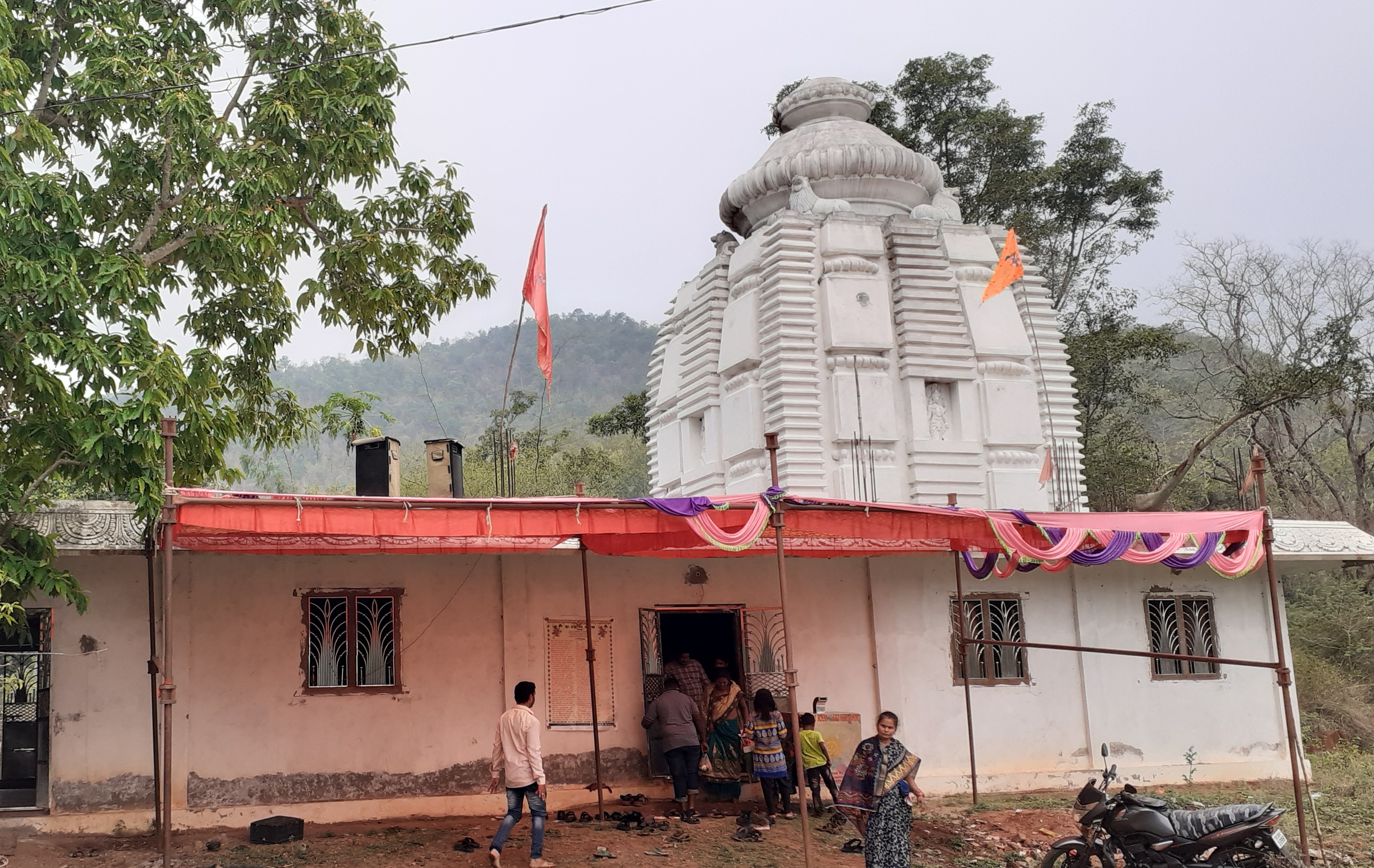
Hanuman Temple at Kailashpur (Rayagada)

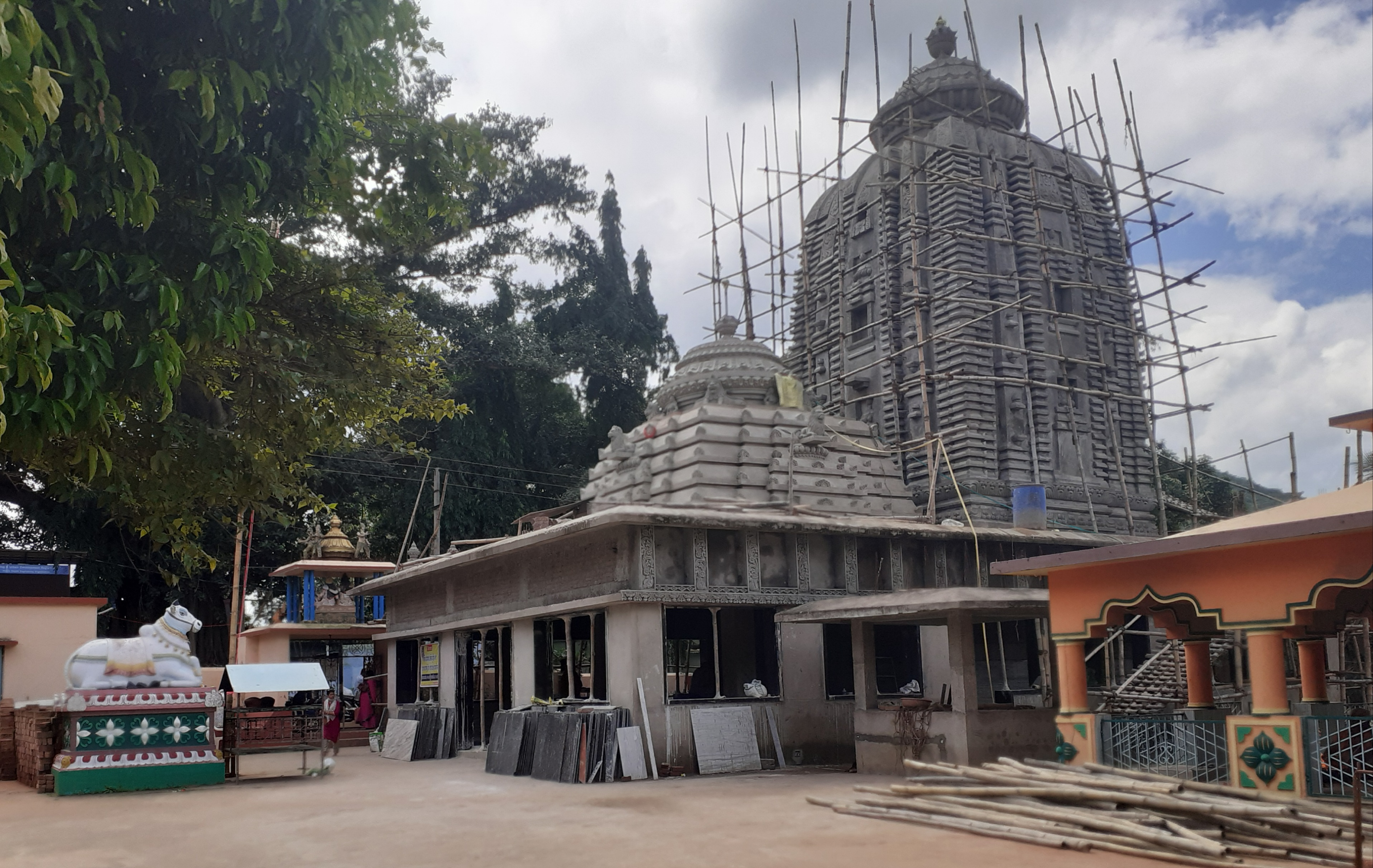
Balunkeswar Shiv Temple, Rayagada

== See also ==
- Lists of Hindu temples
