= Gunupur =

- Town
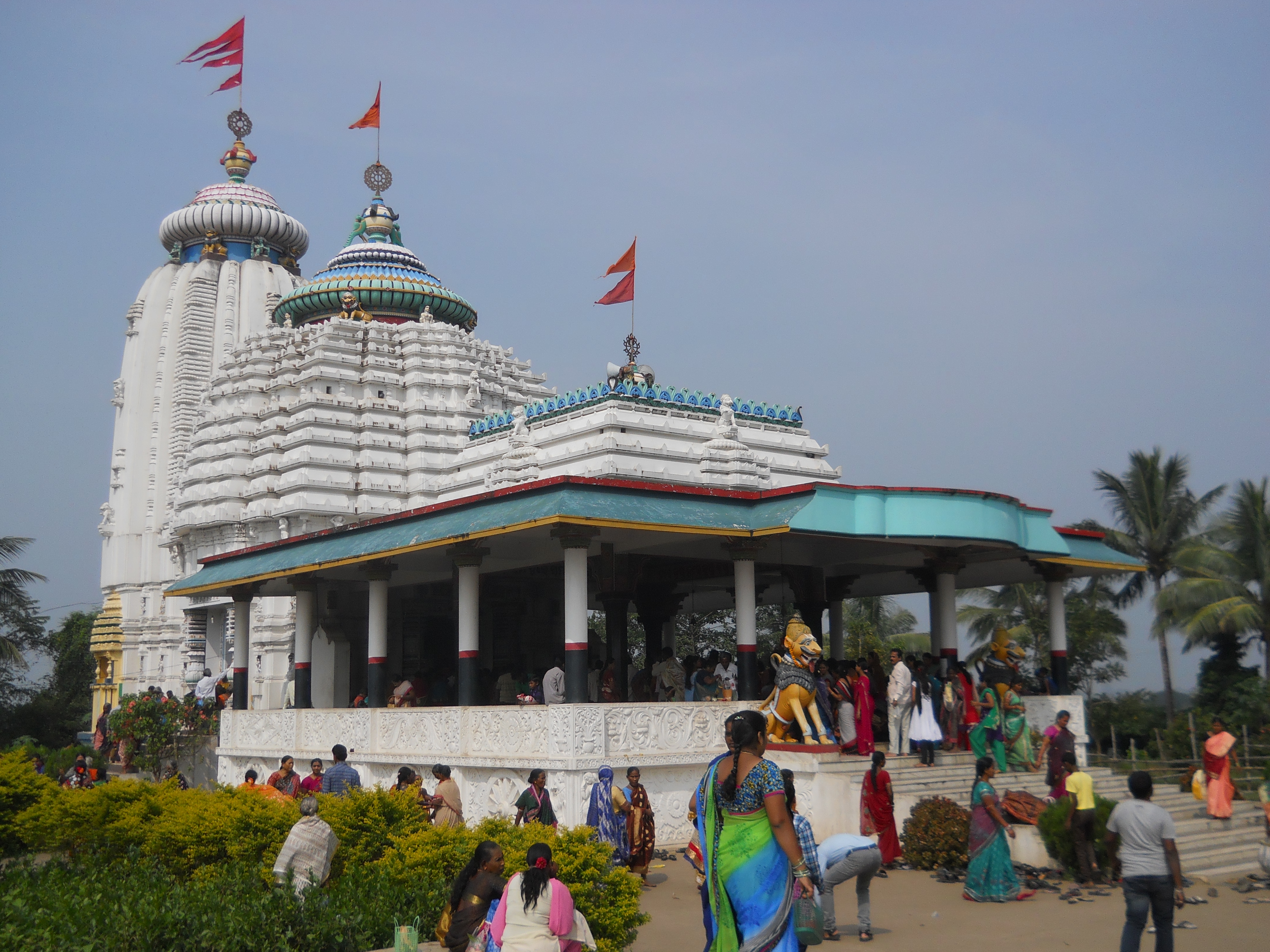
- Jagannath Temple at Gunupur

- Location in Odisha, India Gunupur (India)
- Coordinates: 19.08°N 83.82°E
- Country: India
- State: Odisha
- District: Rayagada

Government
  - Type: Municipality
  - Body: Gunupur Municipal Council
- Elevation: 83 m (272 ft)

Population (2018)
  - Total: 60,000

Language
  - Official: Odia
- Time zone: UTC+5:30 (IST)
- PIN: 765022
- Telephone code: 06857
- Vehicle registration: OR-18, OD-18
- Website: odisha.gov.in, gunupurmunicipality.com

Gunupur is a Municipality and one of the sub-divisional headquarters of Rayagada district in the Indian state of Odisha. It is the second biggest town in Rayagada district.

== History ==
Gunupur was one of the important centers in the erstwhile Jeypore Kingdom that existed from the mid-15th century until the end of the 18th century. Rajah Narasingh Dev was the third son of Maharajah Vikram Dev I (1758–1781 CE) of Jeypore and was appointed as the ruler of Gunupur and Gudari region. Whereas, his elder brother Maharajah Ramchandra Dev II ascended the royal seat of Jeypore in 1781. Another brother called Rajah Jagganath Dev became the king of Nabarangpur. Rajah Narasingh Dev ruled for a few years and was succeeded by his only son Rajah Krishna Dev who died in a few years with no progeny. Hence, Gunupur-Gudari were remerged to Jeypore kingdom. It was then ruled by the Maharajahs of Jeypore under British Administration. The state of Odisha was formed on 1 April 1936 with Koraput as one of the six districts and Gunupur came under Koraput district as a sub-division.

On 2 October 1992, Gunupur and Rayagada sub-division were carved out of the erstwhile Koraput district and formed a new district as Rayagada.

== Demography ==
As of 2011 India census, Gunupur has a population of 62,870. Males constitute 50% of the population and females 50%. Gunupur has an average literacy rate of 80.4%, higher than the national average of 74.4%: male literacy is 85.56% and female literacy is 70.40%. In Gunupur, 11% of the population is under 6 years of age.

== Geography and Climate ==
Gunupur is located at 19.08°N 83.82°E. It has an average elevation of 83 metres (272 ft). It is located in the lap of the Eastern Ghat and on the banks of river Bansadhara. It has a mixed climate of mountains and Coastal Plain. Its outer region is completely covered by forests and Hills. Earthquake zones of India places Gunupur inside seismic zone II on a scale ranging from I to V in order of increasing susceptibility to earthquakes.

Climate data for Gunupur
Month	Jan	Feb	Mar	Apr	May	Jun	Jul	Aug	Sep	Oct	Nov	Dec	Year
Record high °C (°F)	38.5 (101.3)	33.2 (91.8)	39.9 (103.8)	38.4 (101.1)	40.5 (104.9)	40.5 (104.9)	39.9 (103.8)	37.2 (99.0)	37.5 (99.5)	36 (97)	34.6 (94.3)	32 (90)	40.5 (104.9)
Mean daily maximum °C (°F)	27.8 (82.0)	29.3 (84.7)	30.9 (87.6)	31.8 (89.2)	33 (91)	32.3 (90.1)	31.2 (88.2)	31.3 (88.3)	31.3 (88.3)	31 (88)	29.8 (85.6)	28.2 (82.8)	33 (91)
Mean daily minimum °C (°F)	20.5 (68.9)	22.2 (72.0)	24.5 (76.1)	26.2 (79.2)	27.4 (81.3)	27.2 (81.0)	26.2 (79.2)	25.9 (78.6)	25.8 (78.4)	25 (77)	23.1 (73.6)	20.8 (69.4)	20.8 (69.4)
Record low °C (°F)	13.6 (56.5)	14 (57)	20 (68)	21 (70)	16.4 (61.5)	20 (68)	21.4 (70.5)	21 (70)	16.4 (61.5)	15.6 (60.1)	14.9 (58.8)	10.6 (51.1)	10.6 (51.1)
Average precipitation mm (inches)	12.4 (0.49)	31.7 (1.25)	18.6 (0.73)	18.8 (0.74)	99.8 (3.93)	124.7 (4.91)	133.2 (5.24)	154.1 (6.07)	219 (8.6)	202.4 (7.97)	99.3 (3.91)	10.9 (0.43)	1,124.9 (44.27)
Average relative humidity (%)	60	61	63	66	66	74	83	85	83	76	66	60	70
Source: Gunupur Weather

== Governance ==
Courts

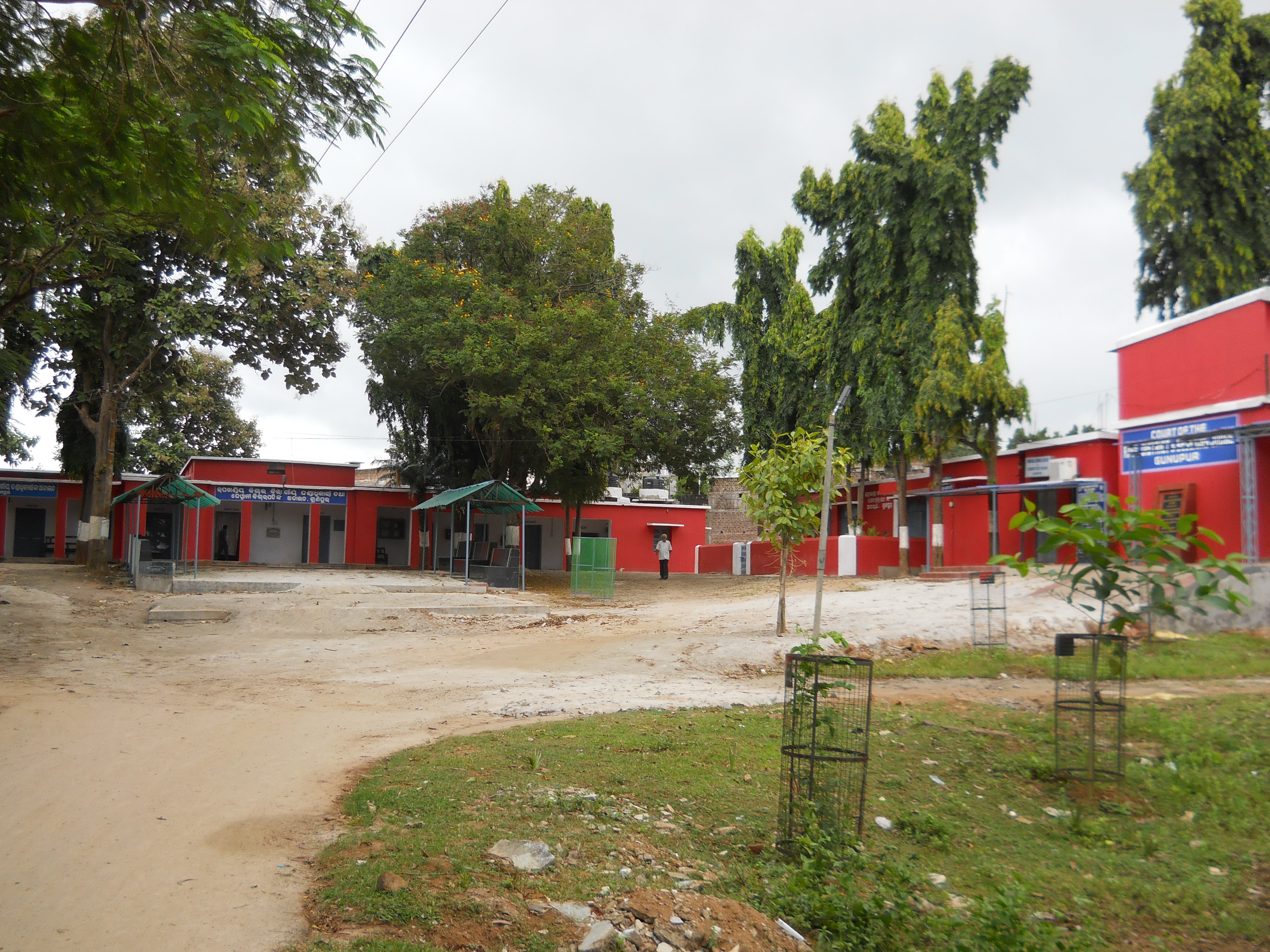
Court Campus, Gunupur

There are several Judicial courts at Gunupur under the control of District Court Rayagada. The Court of Senior Civil Judge-cum-Asst. Sessions Judge, the court of Sub-Divisional Judicial Magistrate, the Court of Judicial Magistrate First Class and other revenue courts like the Court of Sub Divisional Executive Magistrate cum Sub Collector and the Court of Tahasildar are situated here. As per the demand of the Bar Association, Gunupur and the litigant public, the Court of Additional District & Sessions Judge at Gunupur started functioning from 20 September 2014.

Politics

Current MLA from Gunupur Assembly Constituency is Sri Satyajeet Gomango of Congress, who won the seat in State elections of 2024. Previous MLAs from this seat include Raghunath Gomango & Rammurthy Mutika who won the seat in 2019 (BJD), Ram Murty Gamango who won this seat in 2000 as BJP candidate and as a JD candidate in 1990, Akshaya Kumar Gomango of INC in 1995, and Bhagirathi Gomango who won this seat as INC candidate in 1985 and 1977 and as INC(I) candidate in 1980.

Gunupur is part of Koraput (Lok Sabha constituency).

== Transport ==
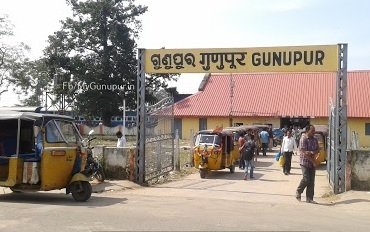
Gunupur Station

Gunupur is connected to other parts of Odisha by state highway SH17(Gunupur-Digapahandi-Berhampur) and SH04(Paralakhemundi-Gunupur-Rayagada-Koraput). It is also well connected with major cities of Andhra Pradesh. Odisha State Road Transport Corporation, Andhra Pradesh State Road Transport Corporation, and Private buses run frequently between Gunupur to other parts of Odisha and Andhra Pradesh. Gunupur is connected by the 90 km long Naupada-Gunupur branch railway line to Naupada railway junction on the Khurda Road-Visakhapatnam section of the Howrah-Chennai route. The nearest airport is the Alluri Sitarama Raju International Airport at a distance of 200 km towards the south. The other nearest airport is the Bhubaneswar Airport, which is about 360 km.

== Tourism ==
Gunupur and its vicinity have of many charms, is a thrill to the searching eyes. It has the facilities to serve as a base for visiting the nearby place of interest.

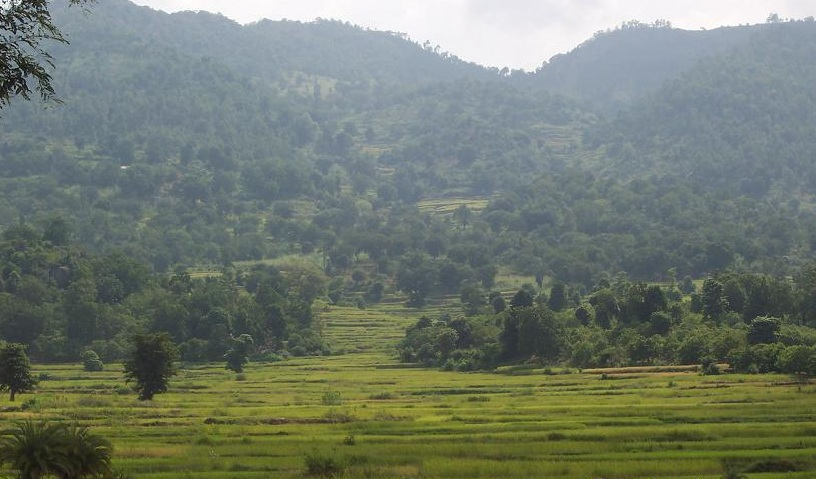
Landscape, Puttasing Valley, Gunupur

- Minajhola is only 70 km from Gunupur. It is a beauty spot of nature, has a siva temple at the confluence of three rivers. It is situated in the heart of dense forest, rich in wildlife. Sivaratri is a popular festival of this place. Though there is no good all-weather road yet, the place is worth visiting. Regular bus service is available from Rayagada and Gunupur up to Gudari. The rest 25 km road is Jeepable.
- Padmapur houses the shrine of Manikeswari Siva. It is identified to be the seat of Dharmakirti, the Buddhist-Logician-philosopher. It is a 7th-century temple. In one of the temple something is written in some strange language (Pali) and the temple is built using only seven stones. It is 20 km from Gunupur.
- Chatikona is located about 60 km from Gunupur surrounded by a series of valleys and wooded hills of varying colours and the place is a center of pilgrimage for the temple of Mahadev. It offers picnickers gorgeous view of the waterfall. The Siva temple is the focus of hectic activities on Siva Ratri. The Dongaria Kondha of Chatikona represent the primitive section of the tribe.
- Maa Markama Temple is located at Bissam Cuttack, 70 km from Gunupur. The temple got a new look and surrounded by lush green forest. Many people visit from near and far especially on Tuesdays. The town college has also been named after Goddess Markama.
- Majhighariani Temple is located at Rayagada. This temple is famous in Southern Division of Odisha and Andhra Pradesh. Most of the devotees come from Madhya Pradesh Chhatishgarh, Andhra Pradesh including undivided Koraput District. During Sunday, Wednesday and Friday a large number of devotees come to worship the Maa MajhiGhariani. The temple is known for Chaitra-Parba, i.e., March–April of every year.

== Education ==
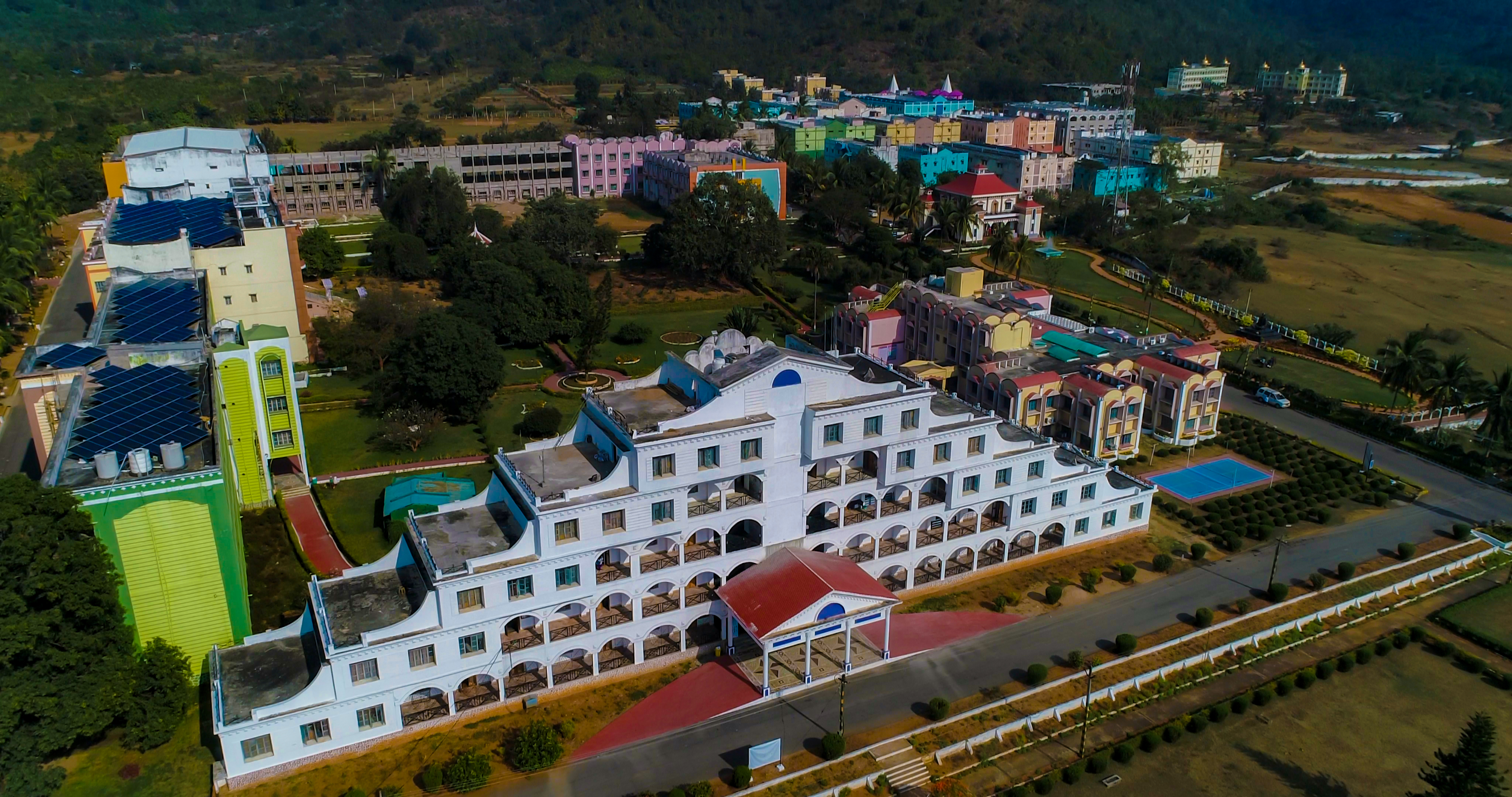
GIET University

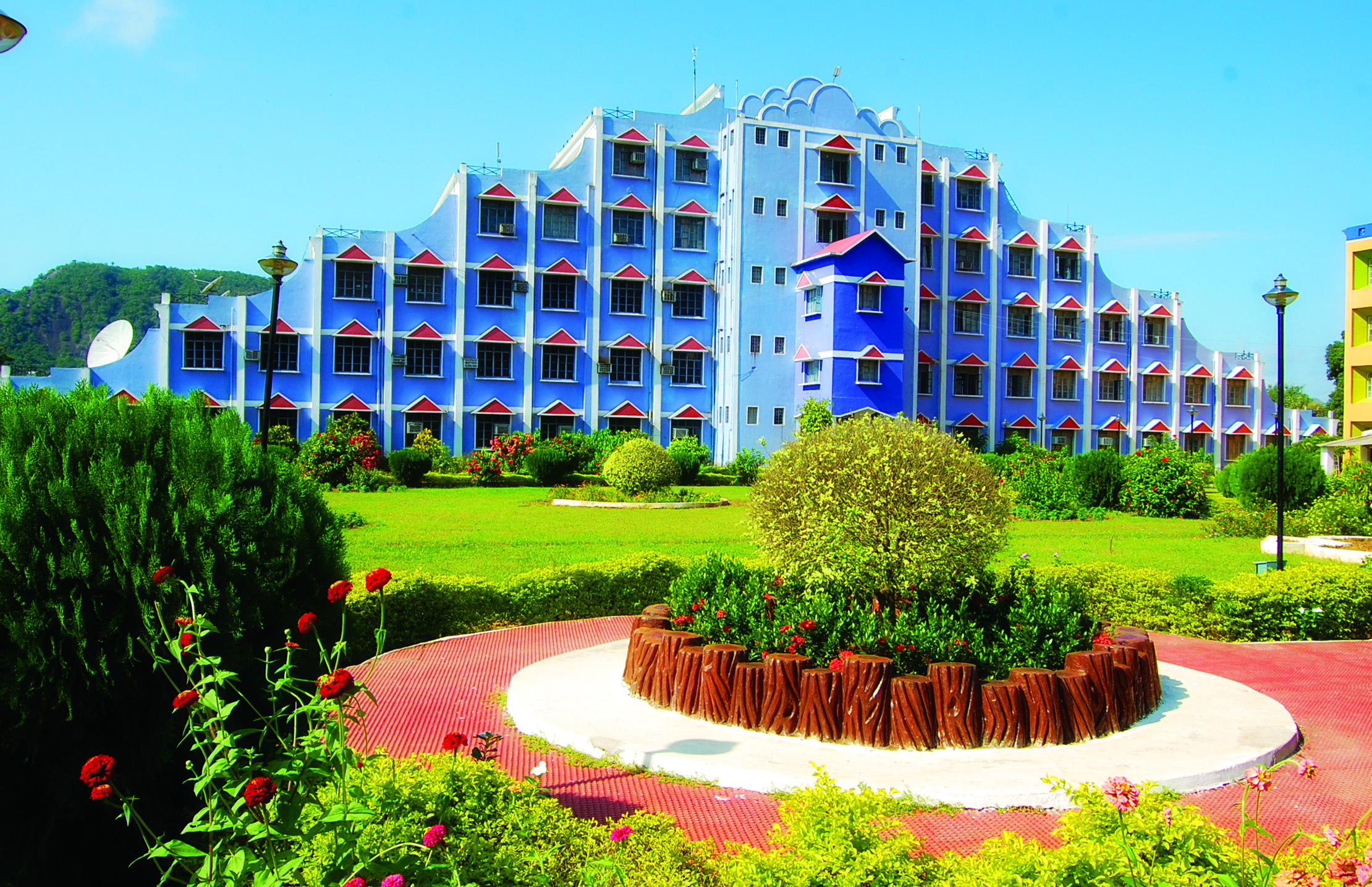
Department of Computational Sciences

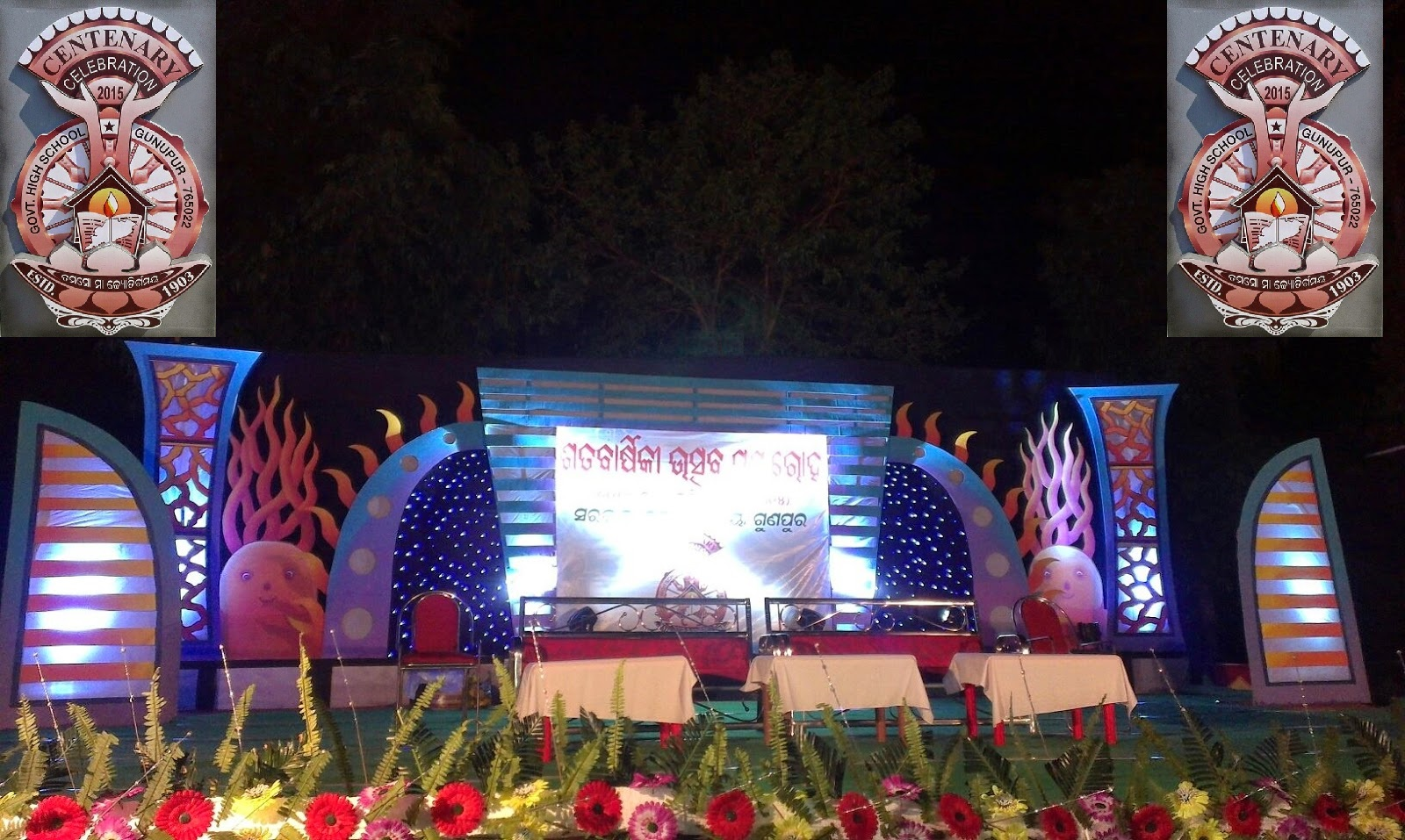
Gunupur Government Boy's High School Centennial Celebration

Gunupur, despite being predominantly inhabited by tribal communities, has been deeply committed to education for a long time, resulting in a literacy rate that surpasses the national average. The region's commitment to education is evident in the establishment of its first high school in 1903, prior to India's independence, and its first degree college in 1972. Today, Gunupur is a hub of excellent educational institutions, including the renowned GIET University, Gunupur, which offers education in engineering, management, agriculture, and basic sciences to students from all parts of India and overseas. Additionally, the region is home to the Maharshi Gurukul residential college for students pursuing science streams and the Gayatri College of Science, which was founded in 2017. The Gandhi Public School, which is affiliated with CBSE, is also an esteemed educational institution in Gunupur.
