= Kumudabali =

- village
- Location in Odisha, India Kumudabali (India)
- Coordinates: 19°28′00″N 83°27′00″E
- Country: India
- State: Odisha
- District: Rayagada

Government
  - Type: Democratic
- Elevation: 335 m (1,099 ft)

Languages
  - Official: Oriya
- Time zone: UTC+5:30 (IST)
- PIN: 765020
- Vehicle registration: OD
- Website: odisha.gov.in

Kumudabali is a village of Rayagada district in the state of Odisha, India.

== Geography ==
Kumudabali is situated about 253 km from the state headquarters i.e. Bhubaneswar and 86 km from the district headquarters Rayagada. Kumudabali is situated at lat.19° 50′N and lon. 83° 27′E. The nearest villages are Ambodala, Muniguda and Dangasorada.

== Demography ==
As of 2011 census, the population of Kumudaballi is 1763 out of which male population is 877 and female population is 886.

== Tourist attraction ==
The temple of Shiva (Balunkeswara) is at the confluence of the rivers Vamsadhara and Sakatnala.
