= Gudari =

Gudari may refer to:

- Gudari, Phulbani, a place near Phulbani, Kandhamal, Orissa
- Gudari, Rayagada, a town in Rayagada District, Orissa, India
- Euzko Gudarostea, an army commanded by Basque Autonomous Community (gudari being the Basque word for soldier/warrior)
