= Bhaliapadar =

- Village
- Interactive map of Bhaliapadar
- Coordinates: 19.472597°N 83.452516°E
- Country: India
- State: Odisha
- District: Rayagada
- Block: Muniguda

Population (2011)
  - Total: 322
- Time zone: UTC+5:30 (IST)
- Vehicle registration: OD

Bhaliapadar (Village ID 424927) is a small village under Muniguda Block in the Rayagada district, Odisha India.

Bhaliapadar is rich with natural greenery, hills and tribal groups. According to the 2011 census it has a population of 322 living in 284 households.

Bhaliapadar is accessible by road from Muniguda (5 km). Nearest railway station and bus station at Muniguda is accessible from Bhubaneshwar, Visakhapatnam, Kolkata (Calcutta), Delhi, Chennai (Madras), Hyderabad, Tirupati and Bangalore. The nearest airport is at Visakhapatnam.
