= Minajhola =

- village
- Location in Odisha, India Minajhola (India)
- Coordinates: 19°31′00″N 83°44′30″E
- Country: India
- State: Odisha
- District: Rayagada
- Elevation: 248 m (814 ft)

Population (2011)
  - Total: 371

Languages
  - Official: Oriya
- Time zone: UTC+5:30 (IST)
- Postal code: 765029
- Vehicle registration: OD-18
- Website: odisha.gov.in

Minajhola is located near Gudari in the Rayagada district, in the Indian state of Odisha. It is famous for the Shiva temple, one of the tourist attractions of the district. The main place of attraction is a shiva temple at the confluence of three rivers i.e. Vamsadhara, Chauladhua and Phalaphalia. Situated at the heart of the dense forest, It is one of the identified Tourist Centres (scenic spot) of odisha. Minajhola is famous for its Shiva temple, People from far and near visit the shrine during the festival of Shivaratri

== Geography ==
Minajhola is located at 19°31′00″N 83°44′30″E. It is 134 km away from the district headquarters Rayagada. The nearest railway station is Rayagada.Total population of Minajhola is 371 out of which male population is 182 and female population is 189.
