= Devagiri Hill =

Devagiri hill
- Location within Odisha

Highest point
- Elevation: 394 ft (120 m)
- Coordinates: 18°53′46″N 84°07′15″E

Geography
- Location: Rayagada district, Odisha, India
- Parent range: Devagiri hills

Climbing
- Easiest route: Drive

Devagiri hill rises to a height of 120.2 meters (394 ft) and is 50 km (31 mi) from Rayagada, Odisha, India. Unlike other hills, the top of the hill is a rectangular platform. The 476 steps with which one can reach the top are another unique feature of the hill. At the top of the hill, there are perennial poles of water called Ganga, Yamuna, Saraswati, Bhargavi and Indradyumna Lake.

== Nearby attractions ==
The hill is considered sacred due to presence of Panchamukhi (five faced) Shiva Linga and Asta Linga (Eight Lingas) on the top of the hill. There is a cave in the hill looking like two jaws. There is one still undeciphered inscription which speaks of the antiquity of the place. A Shiva Lingam is enshrined at the meeting of the two jaws. Regular bus services are available from Rayagada to K. Singpur and the sacred hill is close to K. Singpur.
