= Rayagada Autonomous College, Rayagada =

College in Odisha, India

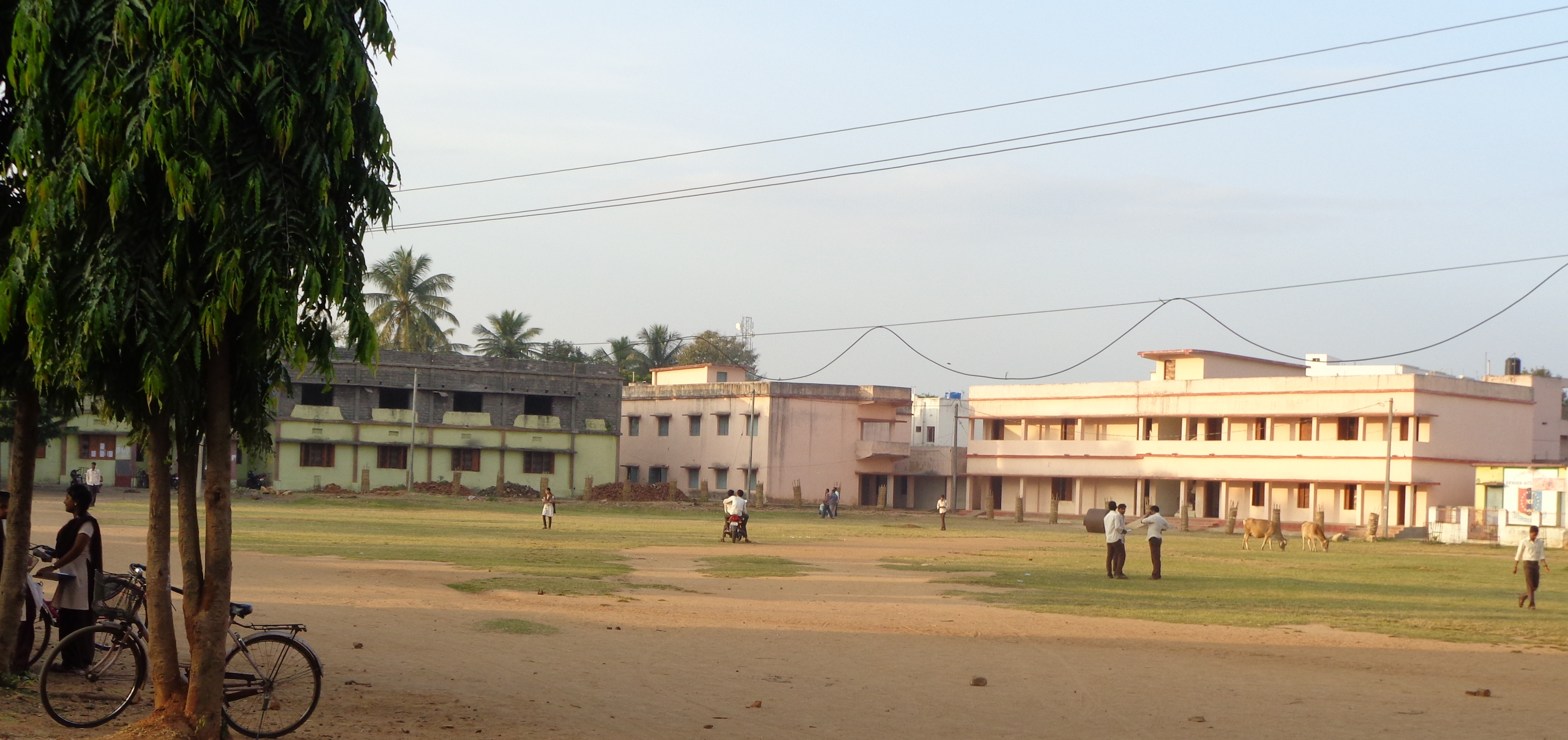
- Motto in English: TRUTH -- PURITY -- BEAUTY
- Type: Education Institute
- Established: 04.07.1966
- Affiliations: Vikram Dev University
- Principal: smt.V.R.Ratna sri
- Location: Rayagada, Odisha, India
- Campus: Urban, spread over 04.00 acres (0.0162 km^{2}) to the eastern-Center of the town.

Rayagada Autonomous College, Rayagada is a nongovernment aided college which is affiliated to the Vikram Dev University at Jeypore and Council of Higher Secondary Education, Odisha, India under the UGC scheme. It is situated in the town of Rayagada; the district headquarters of Rayagada district.

Established in the year 1966, it is one of the oldest private colleges of Orissa. Sri P. K. Mishra, was the first principal of the college. The College has attained Autonomous Status in the year 2007 and certified at ‘B’ level by the NAAC in 2006. The college offers plus 2 course as well as degree course in Arts, science and Commerce stream. A language laboratory is to be set up in the college as decided by the Government of Odisha.

The college is under the administrative control of:

1. The Department of Higher Education, Govt of Odisha, Bhubaneswar.
2. The Governing Body, Vikram Dev University at Jeypore, Koraput District.
3. The Governing Body, Rayagada Autonomous College, Rayagada.

== History ==
The Rayagada Autonomous College was established at Rayagada with its formal inauguration by Sadasiba Mishra, the then Vice-Chancellor, Utkal University on 4 July 1966.

The college was affiliated to Utkal University till the inception of Berhampur University and then was affiliated to Vikram Dev University from 1st June 2023 upon its takeover of jurisdiction of colleges over Rayagada district alongwith nearby Koraput, Nabarangpur and Malkangiri districts.

in 2007 the college attained autonomous status conferred upon it by the University Grants Commission. The college was accredited at Grade ‘B’ to the National Assessment And Accreditation Council (NAAC) in 2006.

=== Academic Milestones ===
Sessions	Courses Opened	Stream
1966-67	Pre-University	Arts
1967-68	Pre-University	Commerce
1968-69	Ist Yr.Degree	Arts
1969-70	2nd year degree	Arts
1971-72	2nd year degree	2nd year degree
1971-72	Pre-University	Science
1972-73	1st yr. Degree	Science
1974-75	Honours in Political Science B.Sc. with C.B.Z	
1976-77	B.Sc. with P.C.M.	
1977-78	Honours in English Honours in History	
1978-79	Honours in Commerce Honours in Oriya	
1979-80	Honours in Chemistry	
1981-82	Honours in Physics	
1982-83	Honours in Botany	
1984-85	Honours in Zoology	
1990-91	Honours in Mathematics	
2006-07	Conferment of Autonomy, NAAC – Accreditation	
2007-08	Honours in Hindi and Telugu	
2018-19	Honours in IT, JMC, Geography, Sociology, IRPM & Education	

== Departments ==
=== Botany ===
Year of opening of the Department: 1971-72 A brief history: The Department of Botany in Rayagada Autonomous College was opened in Academic Session 1971-72 with teaching facility in Pre University (P.U) Degree Classes in Science Started from the Academic Session 1972-73.

- Honours Course in Botany was opened in the Academic Session 1982-83.

==== Chemistry ====
Year of opening of the Department: 1971-72 A brief history: The Department of Chemistry in Rayagada Autonomous College was opened in Academic Session 1971-72 with teaching facility in Pre University (P.U) Degree Classes in Science Started from the Academic Session 1972-73.

- Honours Course in Chemistry was opened in the Academic Session 1979-80.

==== Commerce ====
Year of opening of the Department: 1967-68 A brief history: The Department of Commerce in Rayagada Autonomous College was opened in Academic Session 1967-68 with teaching facility in Pre University (P.U) Commerce & Commerce Degree Classes opened in Academic Session 1968-69.

- Honours Course in Commerce was opened in the Academic Session 1978-79.

==== Economics ====
Year of opening of the Department: 1966-67 A brief history: The Department of Economics in Rayagada Autonomous College was opened in Academic Session 1966-67 with teaching facility in Pre University (P.U) Degree Classes in Arts Started from the Academic Session 1968-69.

- Honours Course in Economics was opened in the Academic Session 1971-72...

==== English ====
Year of opening of the Department: 1966-67 A brief history: Arts Started from the Academic Session 1968-69.

- Honours Course in English was opened in the Academic Session 1977-78.

==== Hindi ====
Year of opening of the Department: 1982-83 A brief history: The Department of Hindi in Rayagada Autonomous College was opened in Academic Session 1982-83 with teaching facility in Pre-Degree (I.A) Degree Classes in Arts Started from the Academic Session 1984-85.

- Honours Course in Hindi was opened in the Academic Session 2007-08.

==== History ====
Year of opening of the Department: 1966-67 A brief history: The Department of History in Rayagada Autonomous College was opened in Academic Session 1966-67 with teaching facility in Pre-University (P.U) Degree Classes in Arts Started from the Academic Session 1968-69.

- Honours Course in History was opened in the Academic Session 1977-78.

==== Information Technology ====
Year of opening of the Department: 2018-19 A brief history: The Department of Information Technology in Rayagada Autonomous College was opened in Academic Session 2005-06 with teaching facility in Pre Degree Classes in Arts & Commerce.

==== Journalism & Mass Communication ====
The Department of Journalism & Mass Communication imparts teaching facilities for Bachelor of Arts. The department was opened in the Academic Session 2018-19. The department follows the CBCS syllabus as prescribed by Govt. of Odisha. The degree programme of JMC is based on various disciplines of media like print media as well as electronic media. The Department has been organizing departmental seminars from time to time.

==== Mathematics ====
Year of opening of the Department: 1971-72 A brief history: The Department of Mathematics in Rayagada Autonomous College was opened in Academic Session 1971-72 Honours Course in Mathematics was opened in the Academic Session 1990-91.

==== Odia ====
Year of opening of the Department: 1966-67 A brief history: The Department of Oriya in Rayagada Autonomous College was opened in Academic Session 1966-67 with teaching facility in Pre University (P.U) Degree Classes in Arts Started from the Academic Session 1968-69.

- Honours Course in Oriya was opened in the Academic Session 1978-79.

==== Physics ====
Established in the academic year 1971-72 the Department of Physics stimulates its students to enjoy the subject and aims to impart them knowledge for day-to-day implications of Physics in the society. It is now one of the best well-equipped departments for undergraduate studies in Rayagada Autonomous College. The department adopted Choice Based Credit System (CBCS) from 2015. From then it is also offering Generic Elective (GE) Physics to undergraduate students with Honours other than Physics. Master of Science program was opened in the academic year 2018-19. At present there are six regular teaching faculties, two demonstrators, one laboratory assistant and two lab attendants in the department.

Apart from the traditional method of chalk-and-talk teaching, the department uses modern ICT enabled methods of teaching using LCD projector.

==== Political Science ====
Year of opening of the Department: 1966-67 A brief history: The Department of Political Science in Rayagada Autonomous College was opened in Academic Session 1966-67 with teaching facility in Pre University (P.U) Degree Classes in Arts Started from the Academic Session 1968-69.

- Honours Course in Political Science was opened in the Academic Session 1974-75.

==== Telugu ====
Year of opening of the Department: 1966-67 A brief history: The Department of Telugu in Rayagada Autonomous College was opened in Academic Session 1966-67 with teaching facility in Pre University (P.U) Degree Classes in Arts Started from the Academic Session 1968-69.

- Honours Course in Economics was opened in the Academic Session 2007-08.

==== Zoology ====
Year of opening of the Department: 1971-72 A brief history: The Department of Zoology in Rayagada Autonomous College was opened in Academic Session 1971-72 with teaching facility in Pre University (P.U) Science Degree Classes.

- Honours Course in Zoology was opened in the Academic Session 1984-85.

== Activities ==
=== National Service Scheme (N.S.S) ===
A unit of NSS is functioning in the College

==== The National Cadets Corps (N.C.C) ====
The NCC Army wing (Boys) with strength of 75 cadets was instituted in the college in the year 1972. The army wing (girls) was commissioned in 2011. The training period for the cadets in the NCC spans over for three years, in order to be eligible for ‘B’ certificate examination, cadets are required to attend the mandatory ATC/CATC in the second year of their being in NCC. The Cadets shall attend a similar camp in the third year of their services which renders them eligible for ‘C’ certificate examination.

=== Youth Red Cross (Y.R.C) ===
As a wing of the Indian Youth Red Cross Society,( Odisha State Branch) the Youth Red Cross started in the college in 1993.

== Facilities ==
=== College Hostels ===
There are three Hostels of the college: two boys hostels and one girls hostel. . The Girls Hostel is present within the college premises. The selection for admission to hostel is made strictly on merit and good conduct after admission into the college.

=== RAYCOS ===
- A Co-operative store has been functioning since 1976, it is registered under the Orissa Co-operative Societies Act. The store is also popularly known as RAYCOS.
