= Tapan Misra =

Indian scientist

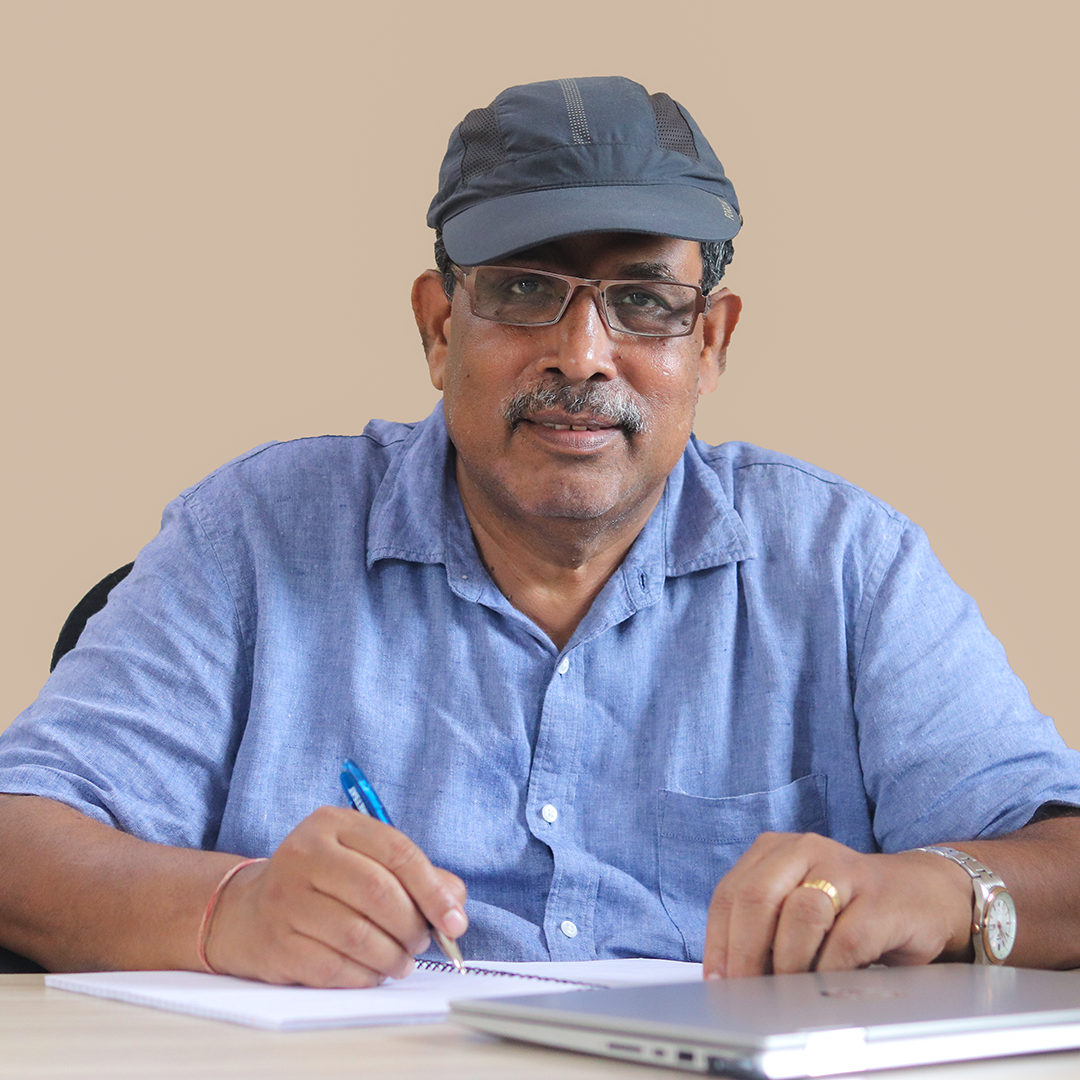

Director, Space Applications Centre, Indian Space Research Organisation
- In office February 2015 – July 2018
- Preceded by: A. S. Kiran Kumar
- Succeeded by: D. K. Das

Director, Physical Research Laboratory, Indian Space Research Organisation
- In office June 2016 – February 2017
- Preceded by: Utpal Sarkar
- Succeeded by: Anil Bhardwaj

Personal details
- Born: 20 January 1961 (age 65) Rayagada, Odisha, India
- Education: Jadavpur University (Electronics and Telecommunication Engineering)
- Website: sisirradar.com

Tapan Misra (born 20 January 1961) is an Indian scientist who has been the Director of Space Applications Centre and Physical Research Laboratory in ISRO. He later became Senior Advisor to the Chairman, ISRO.

In 2022, Misra founded a space-tech startup called Sisir Radar, which manufactures Synthetic Aperture Radars (SAR), a technology that he pioneered in ISRO, for drones and satellites. Sisir Radar will make synthetic aperture radars (SAR) that can be fixed on drones for imaging smaller land areas.

== Early life ==
Tapan Misra was born in 1961 in Rayagada, Odisha to father Sidheshwar Misra and mother Kamala Misra. He had qualified the IIT Joint Entrance examination with an all India rank of 85 in 1980 but opted to study at the Jadavpur University. He secured the First rank in West Bengal JEE in 1980. He was awarded J C Bose National Science Talent Search Scholarship (JBNSTS) in 1981. He graduated in Electronics and Telecommunication Engineering in 1984 from Jadavpur University, Kolkata.

== Career ==
He started his career as a digital hardware engineer and involved in Microwave Remote Sensing payloads in SAC. He managed system engineering of Multi-frequency Scanning Microwave Radiometer (MSMR) payload for IRS-P4 during 1995–1999.

He is widely known for design and development of C-band Synthetic Aperture Radar (SAR) of the RISAT-1. He steered the development of RISAT-2 series of high resolution X-band SAR system. He wrote an algorithm for real-time processing of SAR data during his stint as a guest scientist in the German Aerospace Agency in 1990. He led the development of high resolution C-band airborne DMSAR, airborne L&S band SAR and highly miniaturised X-band SAR for Airborne and UAV Applications.He was also associated with development of the multi-frequency scanning microwave radiometer instrument of Oceansat-1 and Scanning Scatterometer of Oceansat-2. He conceptualised and led development of highly miniaturised Dual Frequency (L and S band) SAR (DFSAR) for Chandrayaan 2 orbiter. He served as the deputy director of microwave remote sensing area of Space Applications Centre (SAC) before being appointed as the Director in February 2015. Tapan Misra demitted the office of the Director of SAC and was appointed a Senior Adviser to K. Sivan, Chairman of ISRO in July 2018.

He also headed the Office of Innovations Management, ISRO, Bangalore. For a brief period he had additional charge of Director, Physical Research Laboratory, Ahmedabad from June 2016 to February 2017. He superannuated from ISRO in January 2021.

In January 2021, Misra revealed through a Facebook post that he was poisoned with arsenic trioxide on 23 May 2017, in a promotional interview at ISRO headquarters in Bengaluru. He was treated in AIIMS and Zydus Cadila hospital. The case is under investigation by Indian Security agencies. He also said that he had survived two poisoning attempts in three years.

He leads a startup company SISIR Radar based in Kolkata, specializing in developing miniaturized SAR systems and other varieties of ground radars.

== Recognition ==
He received Vikram Sarabhai Research Award in 2004 and ISRO Merit award in 2008 for his contribution of development of SAR technology. He was elected as Fellow of Indian National Academy of Engineering in 2007. He was elected Corresponding Member of International Academy of Astronautics in 2008. He is also elected Fellow of IETE and ISRS. He was awarded DSc (Hon.) in 2016 and Distinguished Alumnus award in 2017 by his alma mater, Jadavpur University. He chaired CGMS 2018 (Coordination Group for Meteorological Satellites) in Bangalore, represented India as Principal to CEOS (Committee on Earth Observation Satellites) in Paris in 2017 and participated as team member of Indo-US Strategic Dialogue on Space Cooperation in Washington DC in 2016 and 2018. He also taught at IIT Kharagpur and IIT Jodhpur as adjunct professor. He holds seven granted patents. He has five copyrights and more than fifty five papers to his credit.
