= Jagannath Temple, Rayagada =

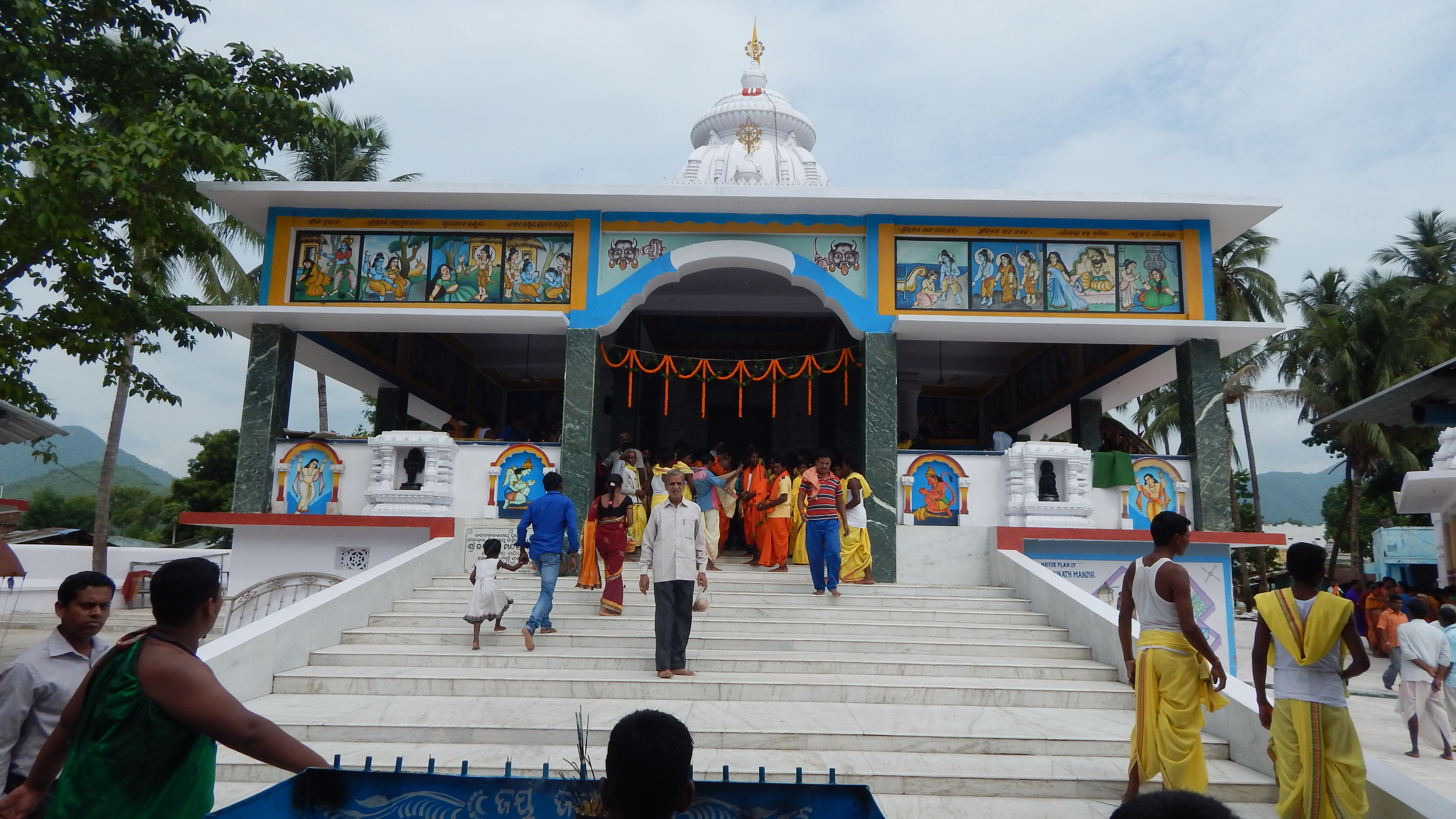
- Jagannath Temple, Rayagada

- Location in Odisha

Religion
- Affiliation: Hinduism
- Deity: Jagannath
- Festival: Rath yatra

Location
- Location: Rayagada
- State: Odisha
- Country: India
- Coordinates: 19°9′36.121″N 83°24′28.044″E

Architecture
- Type: Kalinga Architecture

Specifications
- Temple: 7
- Elevation: 219 m (719 ft)

Website
- Official website

Jagannath Temple, Rayagada, (known as Sradhha Shrikhetra) stands at the southern side of the town Rayagada. The temple was originally built more than 50 years back.

== History ==
Lord Jagannath, Balabhadra and Subhadra are the main deities in the temple. The present structure of the temple, with a new look, has been built in 2007. The Gajapati Raja of Puri honoured the inaugural function of the new Temple on June 20, 2007. Rath yatra is the main festival of the deities.

The temple is at a distance of 110 kilometres (68 mi) from Sabara Shreekhetra Koraput.

== Gallery ==
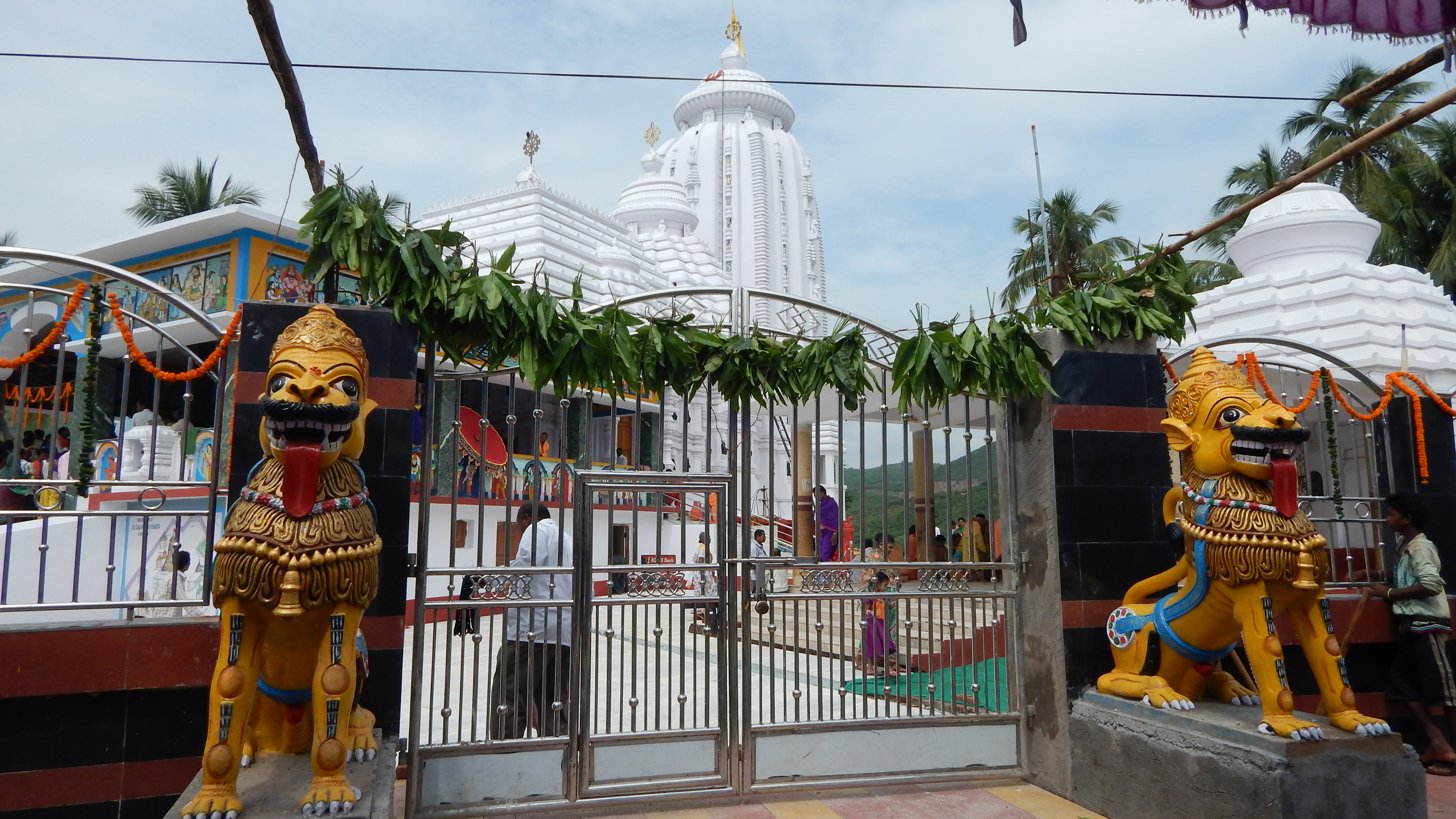
Main entrance

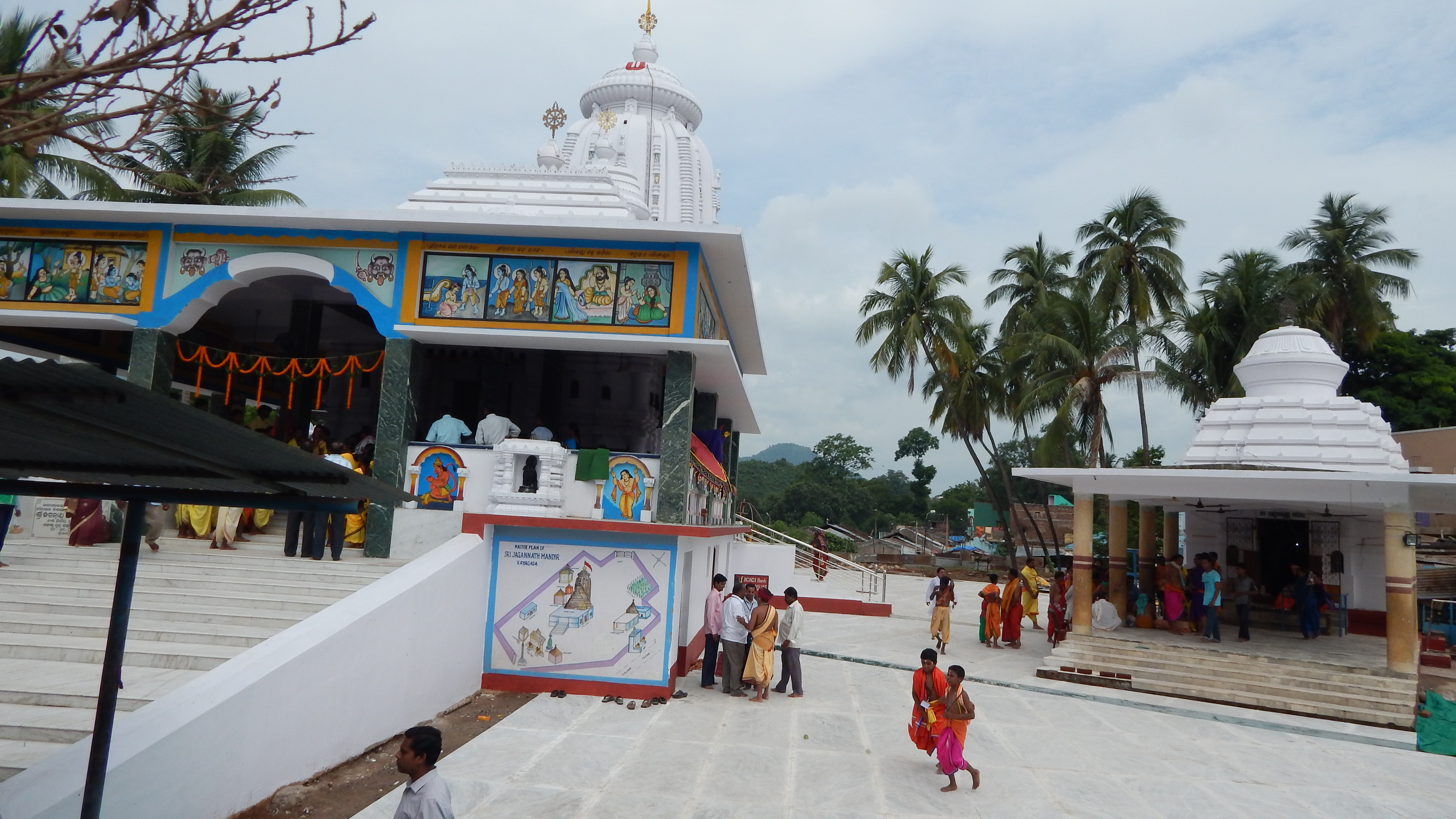
Left view of the temple

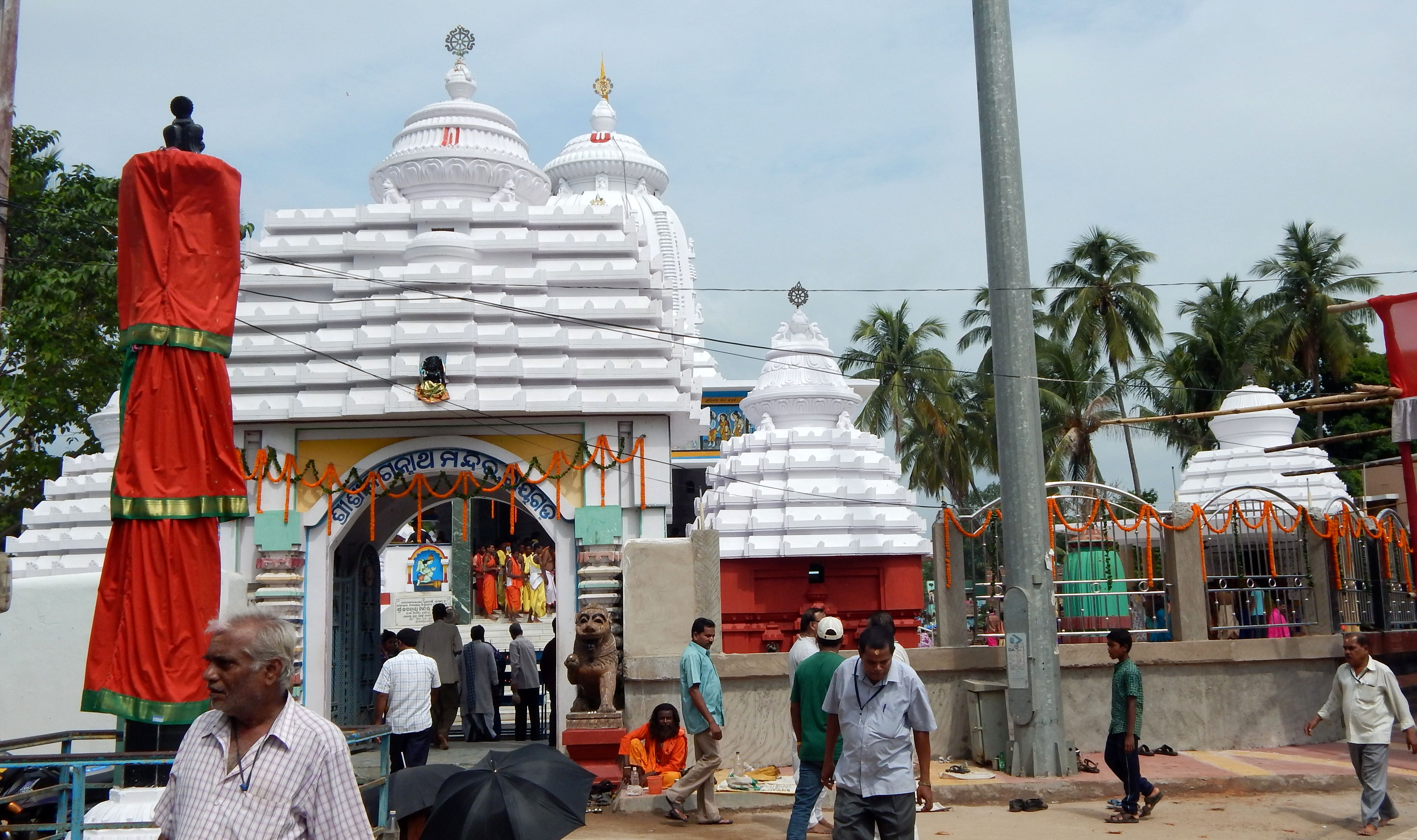
Main temple entrance

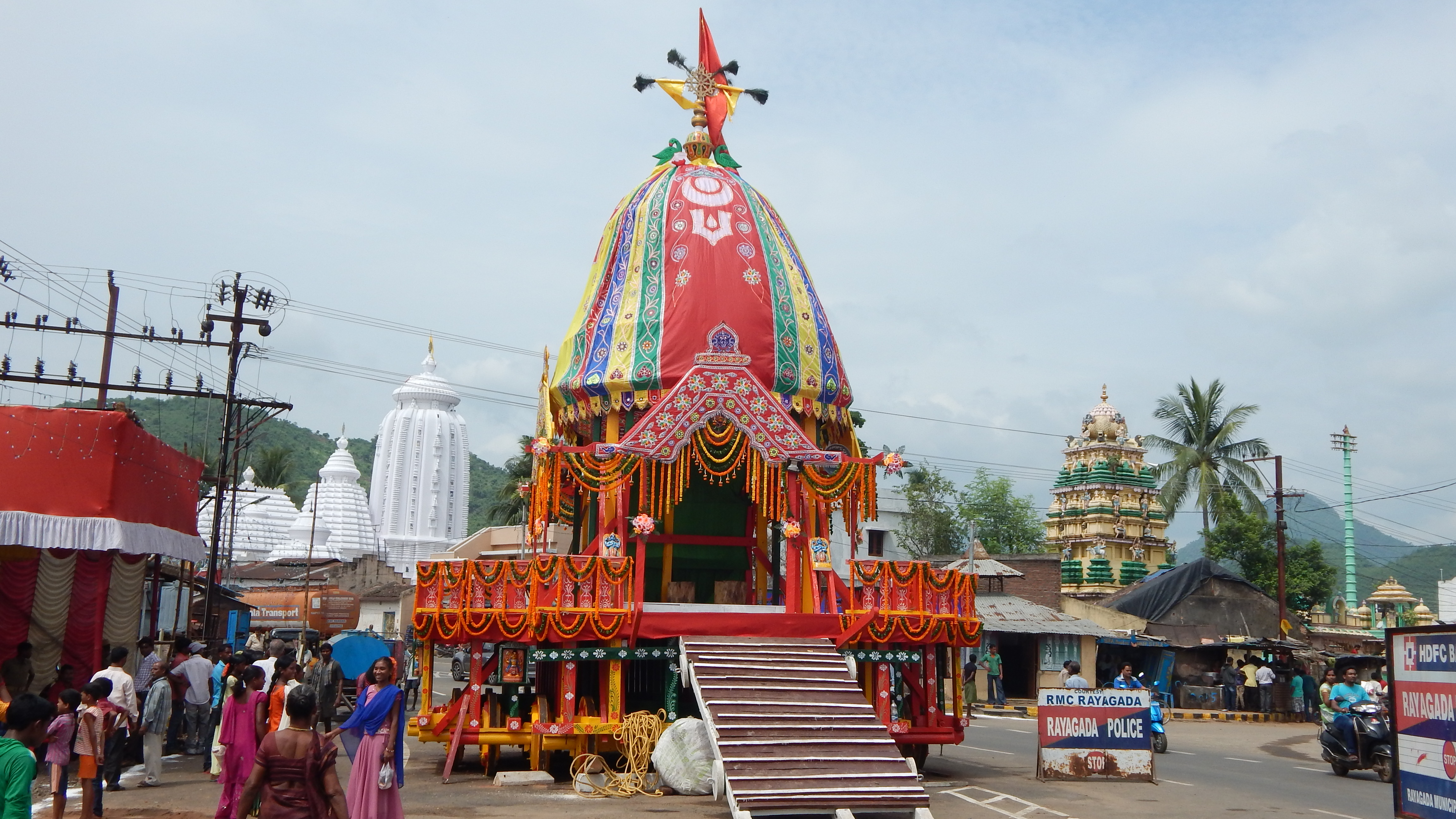
Car ready for Car Festival at Rayagada

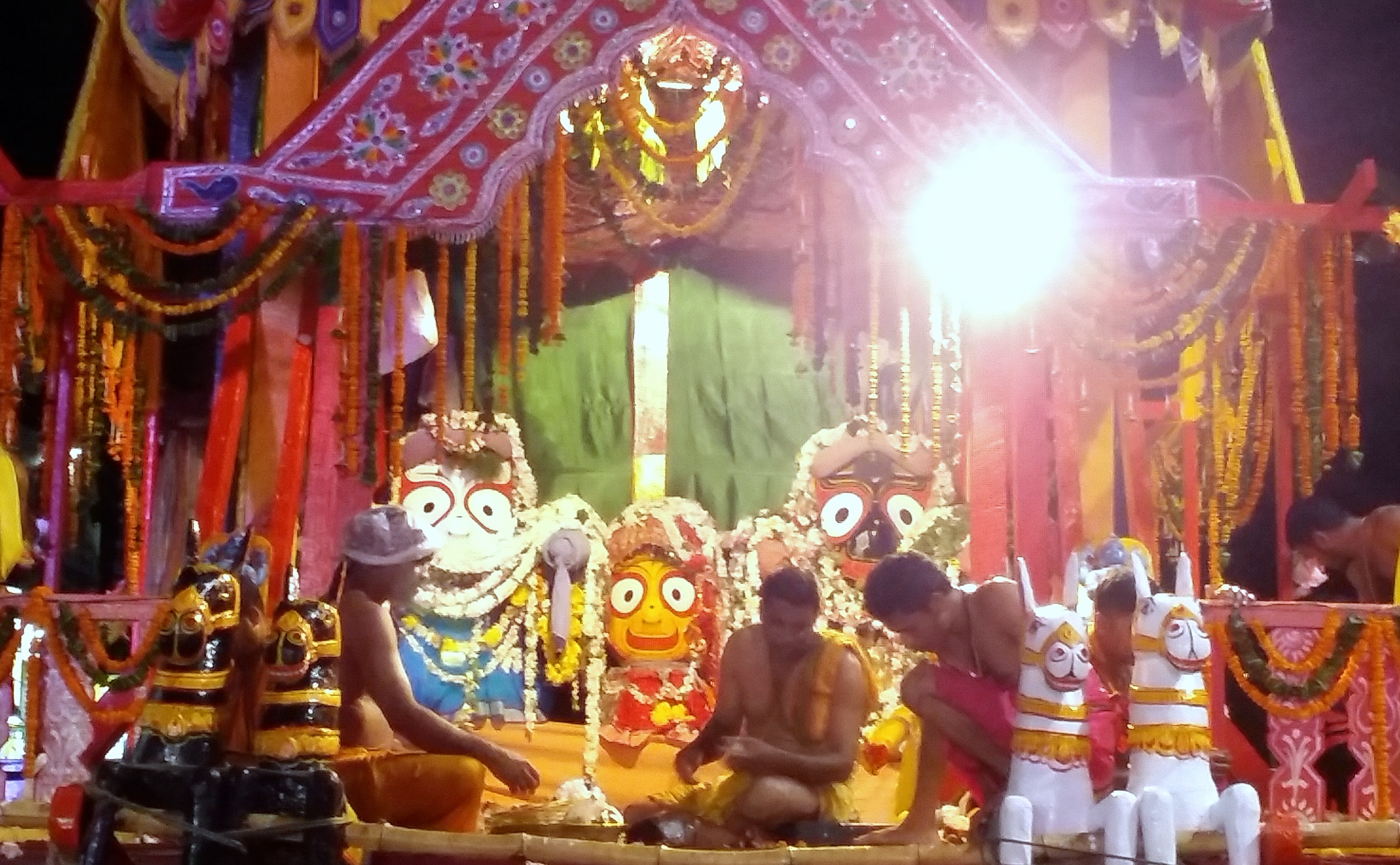
Jagannath, Balabhadra and Subhadra in the Chariot

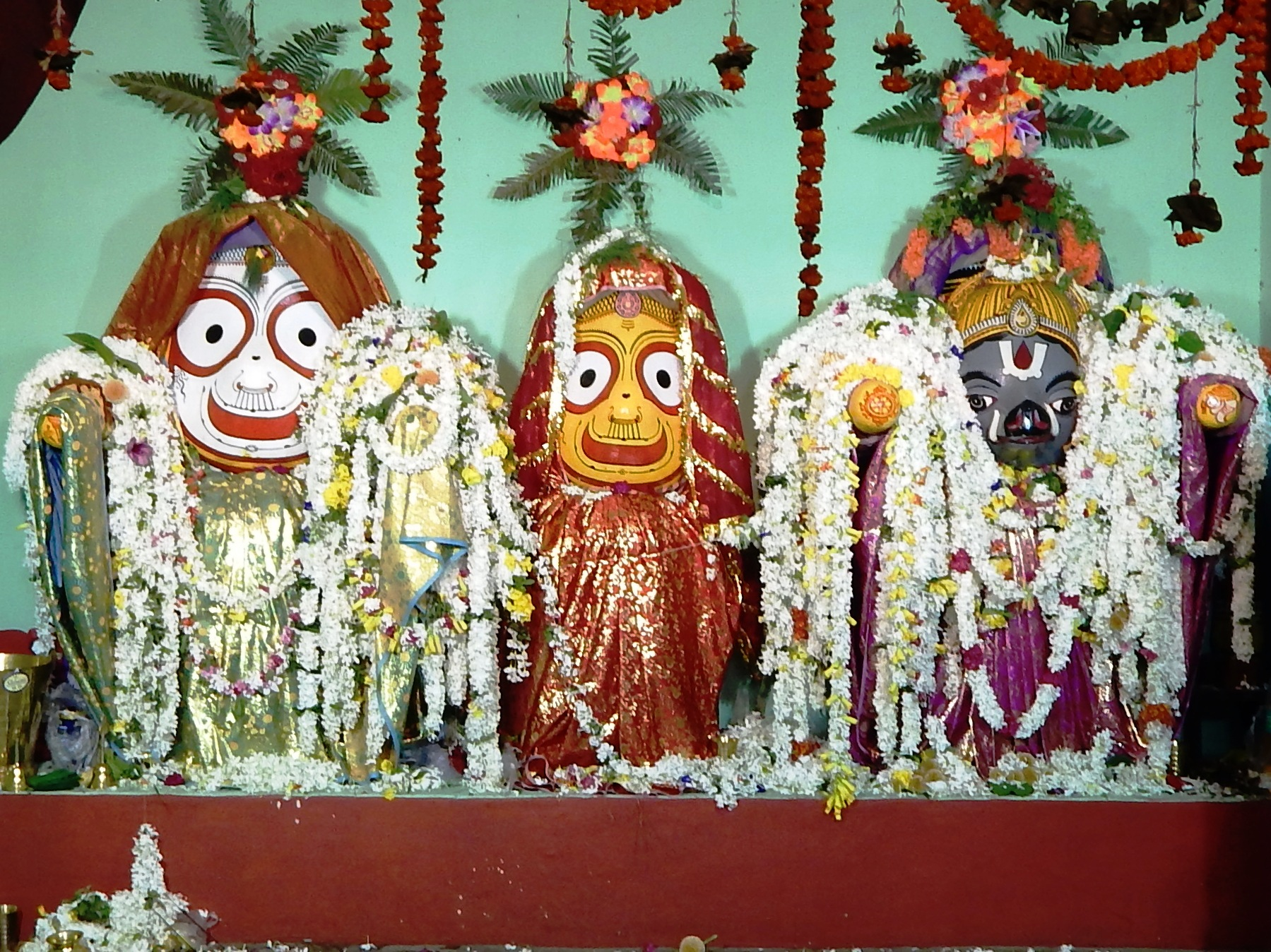
Jagannath in Baraha Avatar in Mausima Temple

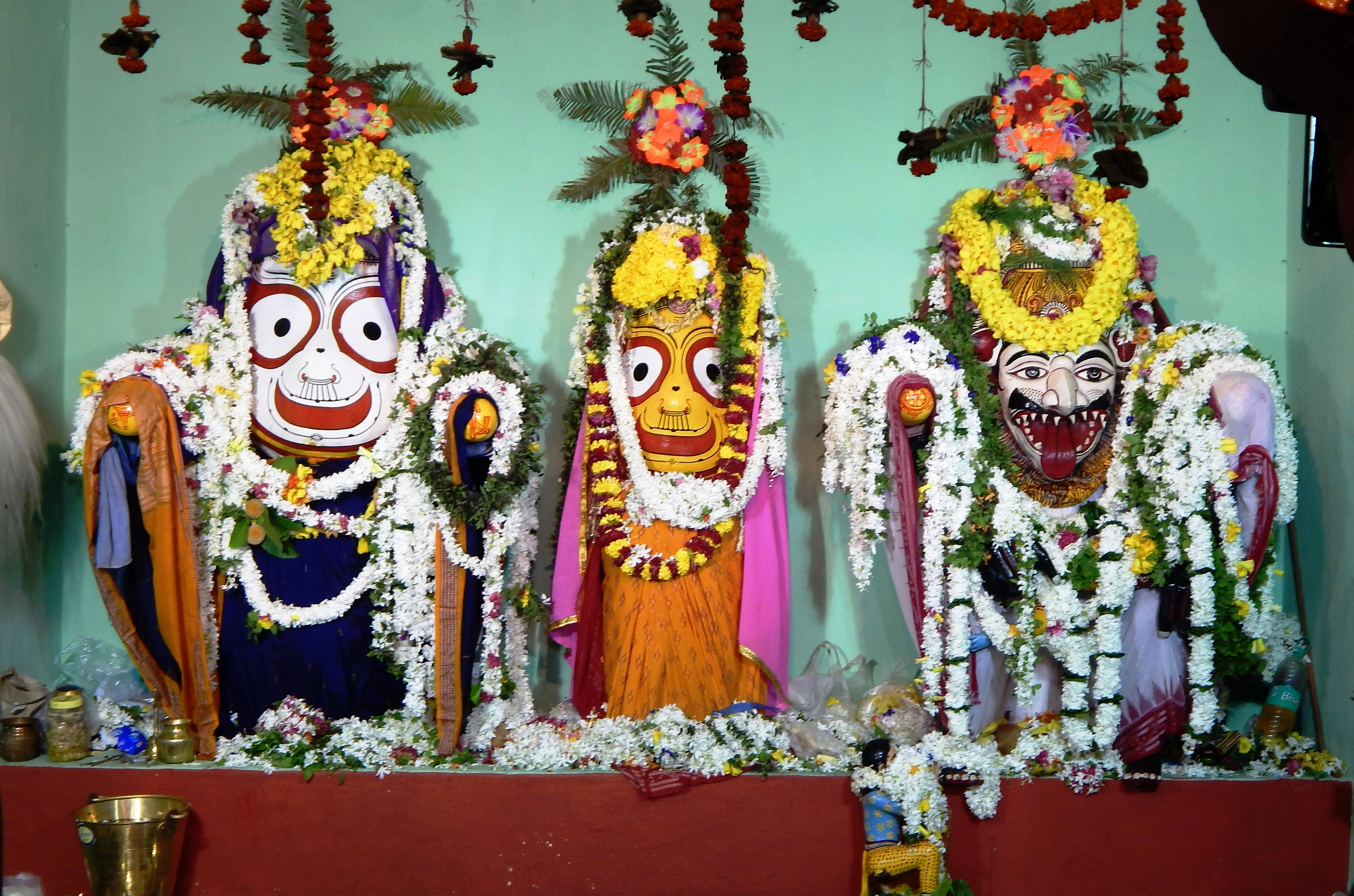
Jagannath in Nrusingha Avatar in Mausima Temple

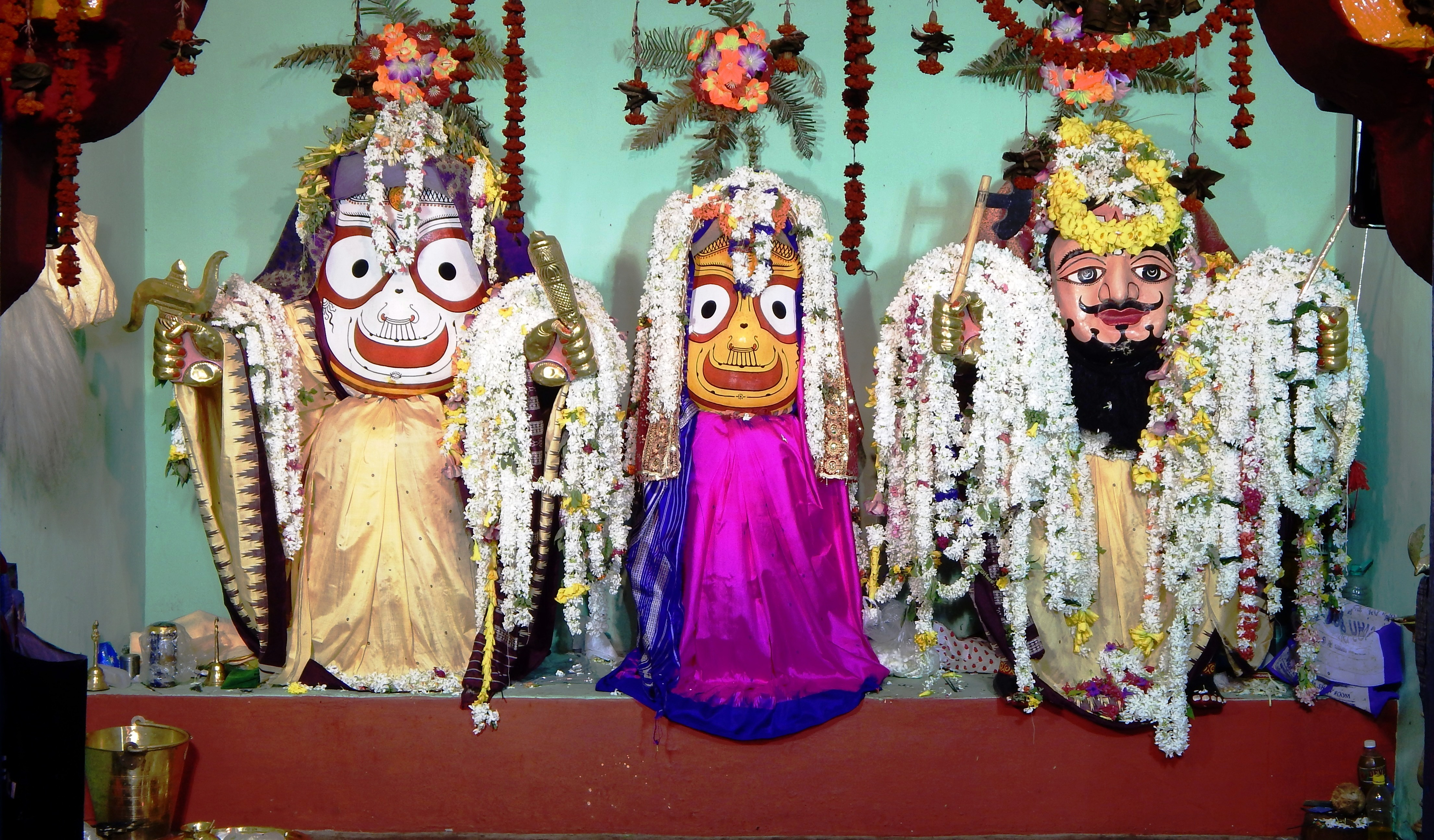
Jagannath in Parashuram Avatar in Mausimaa temple, Rayagada

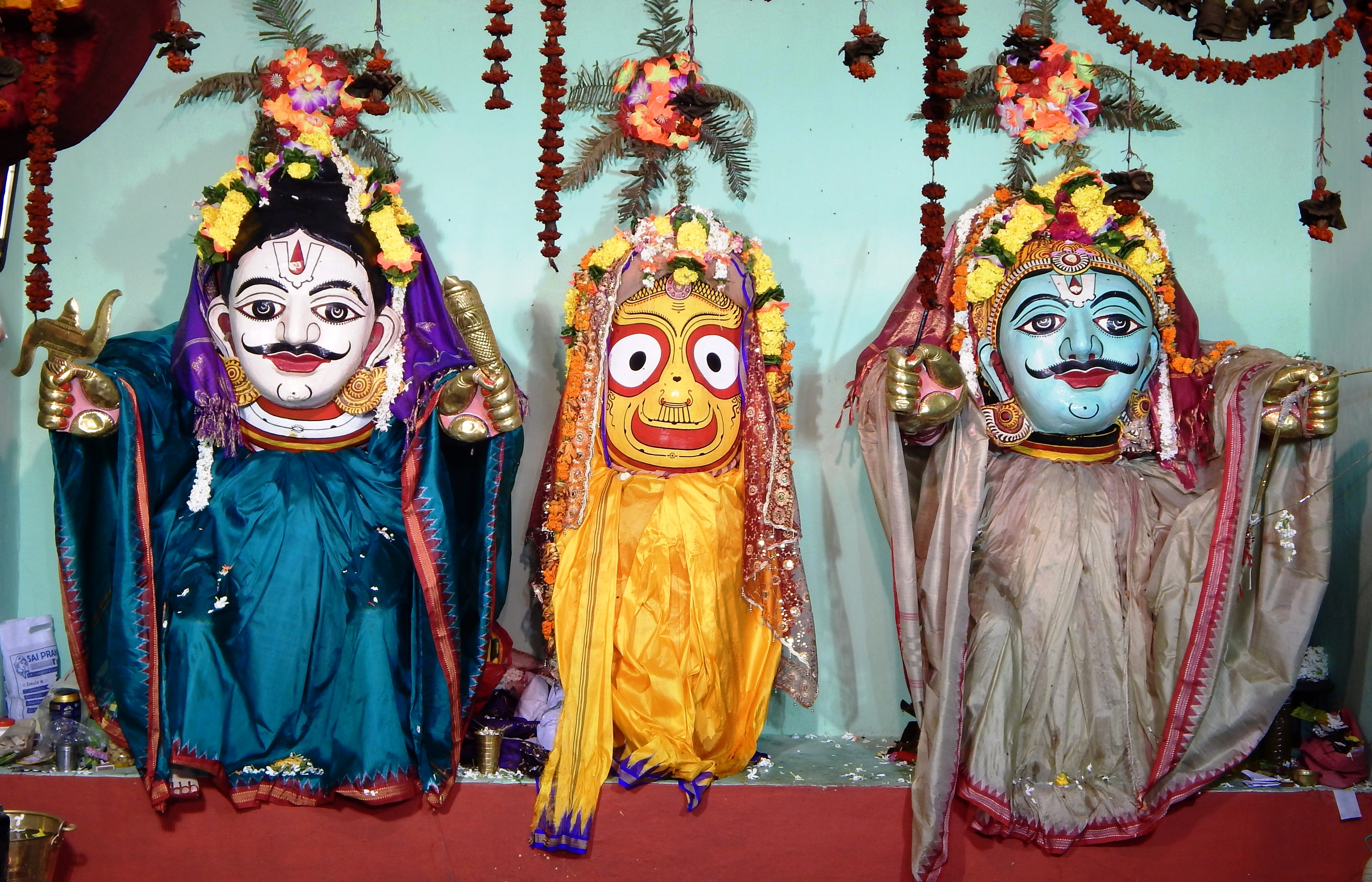
Jgannath in Rama Balaram Avatar

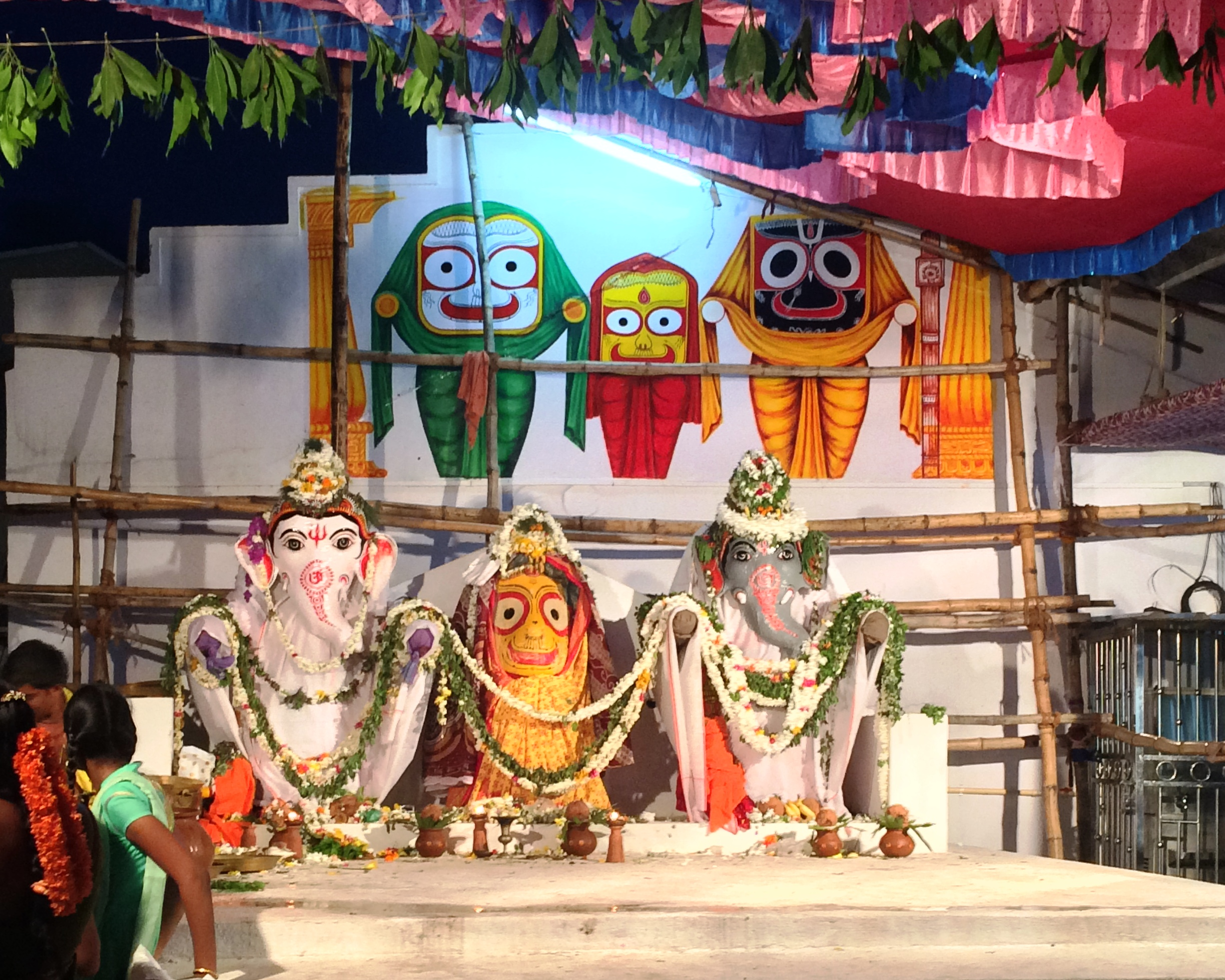
Devasnana Purnima of Lord Jagannath at Rayagada

== See also ==
- List of Jagannath Temples outside Puri
