= Hanging Bridge at Chekaguda, Rayagada =

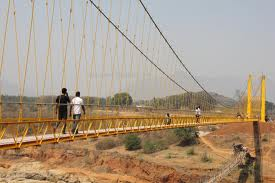
- Hanging (Jhula) Bridge at Chekaguda, Rayagada
- Coordinates: 19.1671096°N 83.4307276°E
- Carries: pedestrians, bicycles, motorbikes
- Crosses: Nagavali River
- Locale: Chekaguda village, Rayagada, Odisha, India

Characteristics
- Design: simple suspension bridge
- Material: Rope
- Total length: 151 metres (495 ft)
- Height: 30.48 metres (100.0 ft)
- Load limit: 8 pedestrians
- Clearance below: 33 metres (108 ft)

History
- Designer: Girish Bhardwaj
- Constructed by: Bharat Grama Sethu Pratisthan
- Construction start: Nov 2011
- Construction end: Mar 2012
- Construction cost: ₹15 million (US$160,000)
- Opened: 2012 (current bridge)

Location
- Interactive map of Hanging Bridge at Chekaguda, Rayagada

Hanging Bridge at Chekaguda is Odisha's second hanging bridge near Rayagada in Orissa, India over the Nagavali River. The bridge links the town of Rayagada to the villages of Mariguda, Chakaguda etc. The bridge is mainly a medium of communication as well as a tourist attraction. The bridge is open all the year round (subject to weather) and people may cross it without a fee.

== History ==
Designed by Karnataka-based 'Bharat Grama Sethu Pratisthana' Chief Girish Bhardwaj, the project was entrusted to Odisha Police Housing Corporation by the District Administration. The estimated cost of the bridge is ₹1.5 Crore under the Integrated Action Plan (IAP) for the Maoist-prone areas. Villagers of eight Panchayats had been making a detour via Kolnara, 25 km from the area to reach the nearby town Rayagada. Three years back the villagers, with the help of SHG made a bamboo bridge to solve the problem of communication. They would now need to travel just 5 km to reach Rayagada.

== Features ==
It spans 151 metres (495 ft) and is 30.48 metres (100.0 ft) above the rocks below. The area is attractive with natural beauty. The only other bridge is at Dhabaleswar. There is no precedent of this kind of a bridge being constructed by the District Administration in Orissa. The project was taken up in December 2011 and the skilled workers worked overtime to complete it in a record time of just 3 months.

== Geography ==
Getting to the place is not difficult. Nearest airport is at Visakhapatnam (Andhra Pradesh). It is located at Lat 19° 10′ 02″ N and Lon. 83° 25′ 58″ E.
