= Rayagada district =

- District of Odisha
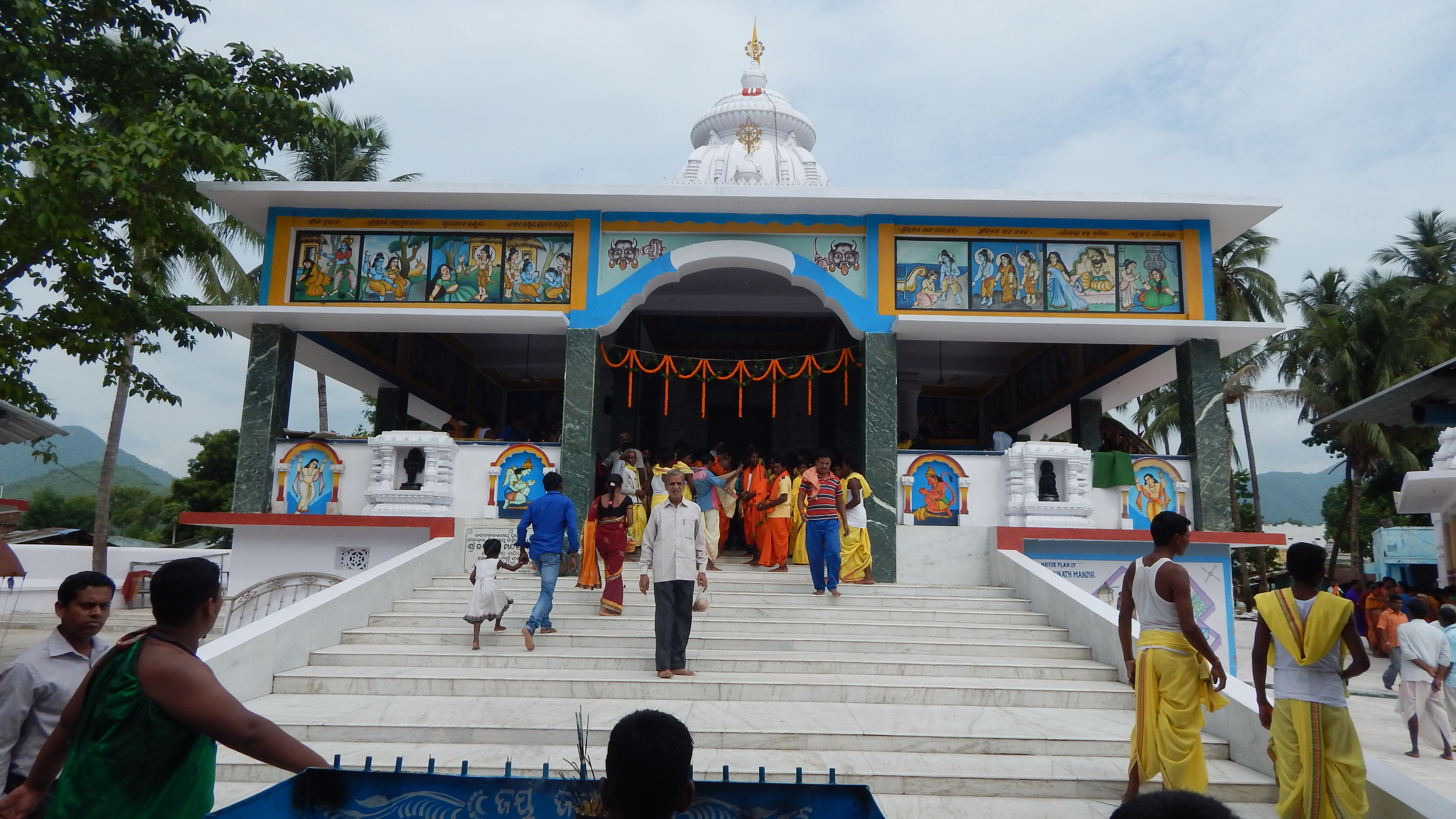
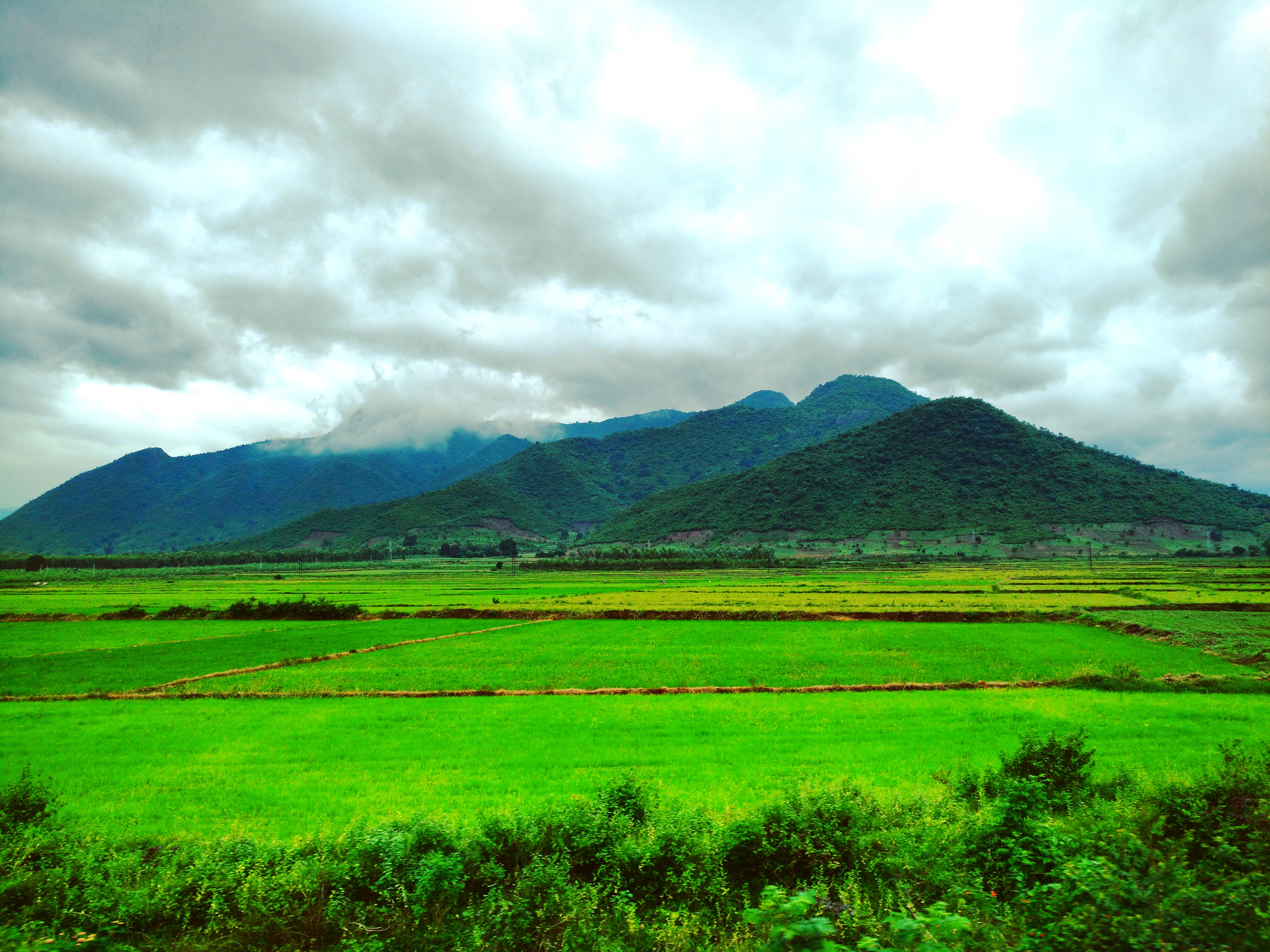
- Top: Jagannath Temple at Rayagada; Bottom: Hills near Gunupur

- Location in Odisha
- Coordinates: 19.166°N 83.416°E
- Country: India
- State: Odisha
- Established: 2 October 1992
- Headquarters: Rayagada

Government
  - Collector & District Magistrate: Ashutosh Kulkarni, IAS
  - Superintendent of Police: Swathy S Kumar, IPS
  - MLA: Kadraka Appala Swamy

Area
  - Total: 7,584.7 km^{2} (2,928.5 sq mi)

Population (2011)
  - Total: 967,911
  - Density: 116/km^{2} (300/sq mi)

Languages
  - Official: Odia, English
  - Local: Kui, Sora, Kuvi
- Time zone: UTC+5:30 (IST)
- PIN: 765 xxx
- Vehicle registration: OD-18
- Sex ratio: 0.972 ♂/♀
- Literacy: 49.76%
- Lok Sabha constituency: Koraput(ST)
- Vidhan Sabha constituency: 138 Gunupur(ST); 139 Bissam Cuttack(ST); 140 Rayagada (ST)
- Municipality: Rayagada; Gunupur
- Notified Area Council (NAC): Gudari NAC
- Website: rayagada.odisha.gov.in

Rayagada district is a district in the southern Odisha state in India. Rayagada became a separate district in October 1992. The district headquarters is Rayagada. Its population consists mainly of tribes, primarily the Khonds and the Soras. In addition to Odia, Kui and Sora are spoken by the district's indigenous population. It was founded by Biswanatha Deba Gajapati of the Surjyabansha dynasty of Jeypore.

== About ==
Rayagada is a District in the southern part of Odisha, India. The district came into existence on 2nd Oct,1992.

It is known as the most famous region of the state, because of its longest human history. The region has been a centre of attraction because of its historical records, which are evident from copper plates, rock inscriptions, and the different coins that have been found.

The district is well connected by the three main ways of transportation, Roadways, Airways and Railways making if accessible to the citizens from all around India.

- Airways- Nearest Airport is at Visakhapatnam, Andhra Pradesh
- Railways- Well connected from the other parts of India like Delhi, Gujarat, Kolkata, Hyderabad etc.
- Roadways- Convenient Road transport options available through the NH-43 Highway

Rayagada covers an area of 7,584.7 square kilometres (2,928.5 sq mi), and is divided into eleven blocks. Agriculture is the chief source of income, and paddy, wheat, ragi, green and black gram, groundnut, sweet potato and maize are the district's major crops.

== Administrative setup ==
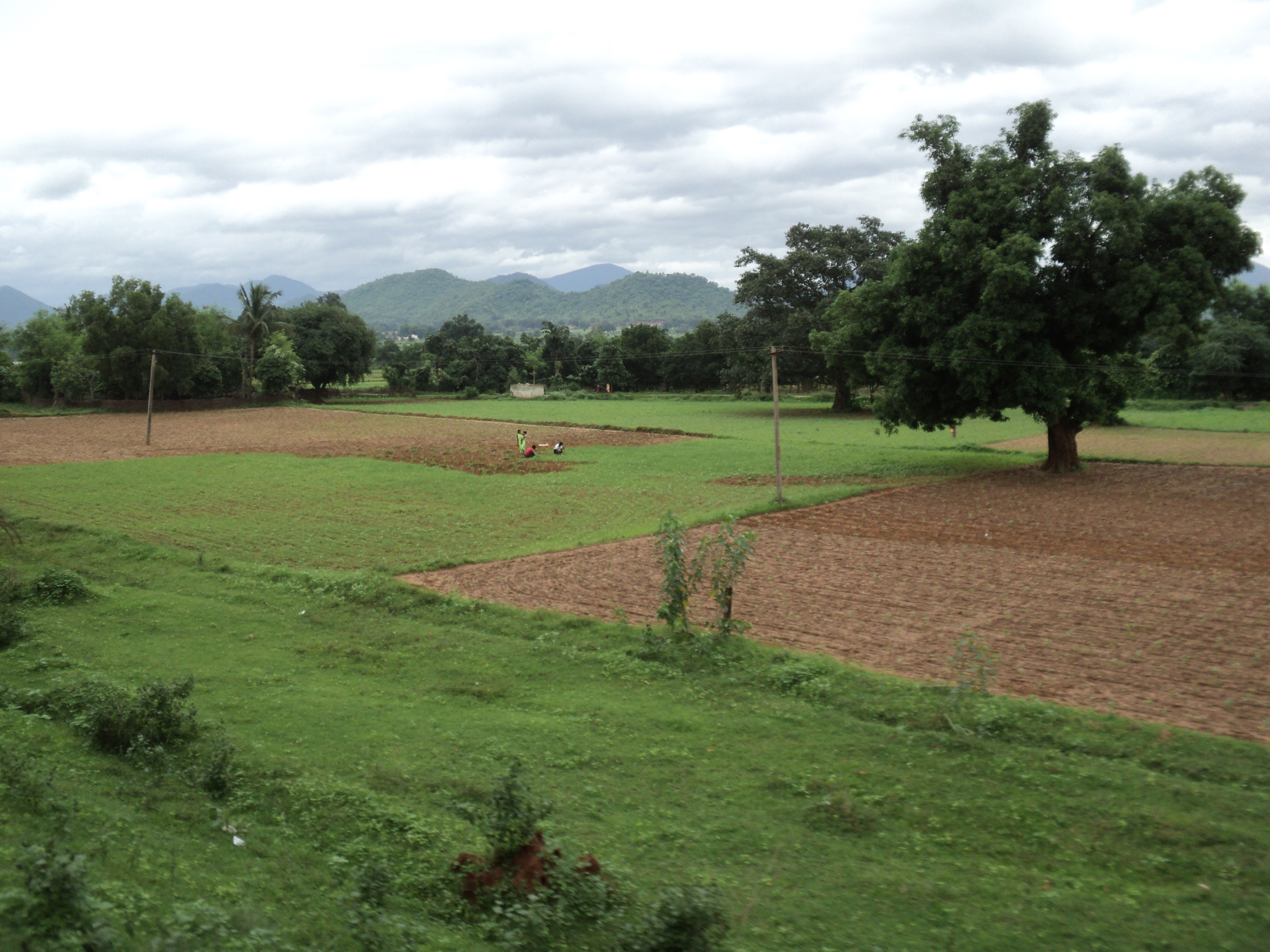
Outskirts of Sambalpur Rayagada Railway line

The 11 Blocks and Tahasils in Rayagada district under two administrative Sub-Divisions are listed in the following table.

11 Blocks and Tahasils
#	Rayagada Sub-Division	Gunupur Sub-Division
1	Rayagada	Gunupur
2	Kashipur	Gudari
3	Kalyansingpur	Padmapur
4	Kolnara	Ramanaguda
5		Bissam Cuttack
6		Muniguda
7		Chandrapur

There are 17 Police Stations under the three Police Sub-Divisions in Rayagada district. They are listed in the following table.

17 Police Stations
#	Rayagada Police Sub-Division	Gunupur Police Sub-Division	Bissam Cuttack Police Sub-Division
1	Rayagada P.S.	Gunupur P.S.	Bissam Cuttack P.S.
2	Seskhal P.S.	Gudari P.S.	Muniguda P.S.
3	Tikiri P.S.	Padmapur P.S.	Ambadola P.S.
4	Doraguda P.S.	Puttasing P.S.	Chandrapur P.S.
5	Andirakanch P.S.		
6	Kashipur P.S.		
7	Chandili P.S., Jaykaypur		
8	Kalyansingpur P.S.		
9	Energy P.S., Rayagada		

== History ==
In the third century BC, during the reign of Ashoka, Odisha was part of the Kalinga empire. The hilly track between the Vamshadhara and Nagavali Rivers was known for its spices. The Rastriks were defeated by Kharvela, the emperor of Kalinga, during the battle of Chawpagada.

Vishwanath Dev Gajapati (1527 - 1571 CE), the suryavanshi king of Nandapur (later Jeypore) established his capital on the bank of Nagavali and named it Rayagada or Rai-gadh. Under his rule the place flourished economically which proved beneficial to the vast kingdom that stretched from the confines of Jharkhand and West Bengal to River Godavari in south. During his reign he fought a war with Quli Qutb Mulk, the first Qutb Shahi Sultan of Golconda and successfully stopped his advance towards his kingdom. However, he had to surrender the rich fertile land located in the middle of Godavari-Krishna Delta to execute a peace treaty which made Godavari the border of the two kingdoms. Rayagada remained under the Kingdom of Jeypore until the dissolution act of 1947.

During the British Raj, Rayagada was under the then-newly demoted Jeypore Samasthanam and was part of Koraput district; it was carved from the district on 2 October 1992 as part of Odisha's district-expansion plan.

== Economy ==
The district is reportedly rich in bauxite and silicon. In 2006, the Ministry of Panchayati Raj named Rayagada one of the country's 250 most backward districts (out of a total of 640). It is one of the 19 districts in Odisha receiving aid from the Backward Regions Grant Fund (BRGF).

== Constituencies ==
The district has three Odisha Legislative Assembly (Vidhan sabha) constituencies.

No.	Constituency	Reservation	Blocks	Member	Party
138	Gunupur	ST	Gunupur, Gudari (NAC), Gunupur, Gudari, Ramanaguda, Padampur	Satyajeet Gomango	BJD
139	Bissam Cuttack	ST	Bissam Cuttack, Muniguda, Chandrapur	Nilamadhaba Hikaka	BJD
140	Rayagada	ST	Rayagada, Kashipur, Kolnara, Kalyansinghpur	Appala swamy Kadraka	Indian National Congress

Rayagada district is part of the Koraput Lok Sabha constituency.

== Rail transport ==
Rayagada railway station has direct service to Kolkata, Hyderabad, Bhubaneswar, Raipur, Bengaluru, Ahmedabad, Mumbai, Jamshedpur, Jodhpur and New Delhi. Gunupur is also an important railway station; via Parlakhemundi, it is connected to Naupada on the main east-coast railway line from Kolkata to Chennai by a 90-kilometre (56 mi) 1,676 mm (5 ft 6 in) broad-gauge line which was converted from 762 mm (2 ft 6 in) narrow gauge in 2011. The 40-kilometre (25 mi) narrow-gauge line (the Paralakhemedi Light Railway, or PLR) was established by Gajpatirajas of Paralakhemundi, the former raja of Paralakhemedi, to connect his capital with Naupada. The government authorized construction in 1898, and the line was opened to traffic two years later at a cost of ₹700,000.

The East Coast Railway began in 1893 with construction of the 96-kilometre (60 mi) Cuttack-Khurda Road-Puri line, and its subsequent 1,280-kilometre (800 mi) link along the East Coast to Vijayawada (the junction of Southern Maratha Railway and Nizam's Guaranteed State Railway) was opened for traffic between 1893 and 1896. The railway brought service to Naupada in 1894.

Due to a policy change by the British government, the Bengal Nagpur Railway took over East Coast Railway's northern section from Vizianagaram to Cuttack, including the Puri branch line, by 23 January 1902. The PLR was also taken over by the Bengal Nagpur Railway that year. In its first few years, the PLR had incurred losses; after 1910 it began making a profit, which increased after 1924–25. This motivated the raja to extend the line to Gunupur in two phases in 1929 and 1931. There were now ten stations between Naupada and Gunupur: Tekkali, Paddasan, Temburu, Ganguvada, Patapatnam, Paralakhemedi, Kashinagar, Lihuri, Bansidhara and Palasingi. The standard PLR locomotive was a 20-ton 0-6-4 tank engine with 27-inch-diameter (69 cm) coupled wheels and a 4.75-ton axle load.

Management of the BNR was taken over by the government of India in October 1944. On 14 April 1952, when Indian Railways was regrouped, it became part of the Eastern Railway. The merger was short-lived, however, and on 1 August 1955 it was merged with the new South Eastern Railway. A set of four postage stamps was released during the 1987 BNR centennial, one stamp featuring the PL 691 locomotive.

The foundation stone was laid for the Naupada-Gunupur gauge conversion at Naupada on 27 September 2002. On 1 April 2003, PLR became a part of the East Coast Railway. The line was closed for gauge conversion on 9 June 2004. Although the 290-kilometre (180 mi) Khurda-Bolangir broad-gauge line was approved in 1995, only about half the work has been completed.

== Demographics ==
Historical population
Year	Pop.	±%
1901	186,480	—
1911	224,190	+20.2%
1921	217,200	−3.1%
1931	256,152	+17.9%
1941	303,663	+18.5%
1951	341,241	+12.4%
1961	403,471	+18.2%
1971	511,333	+26.7%
1981	608,751	+19.1%
1991	713,984	+17.3%
2001	831,109	+16.4%
2011	967,911	+16.5%
Source: Census of India

Religions in Rayagada district (2011)
Religion	Percent
Hinduism	90.34%
Christianity	8.77%
Islam	0.48%
Other or not stated	0.41%

Rayagada district had a population of 967,911 in the 2011 Census of India, roughly equal to that of Fiji or the US state of Montana. The district ranked 454th of India's 640 districts, and had a population density of 136 inhabitants per square kilometre (350/sq mi). Its population growth rate from 2001 to2011 was 15.74 percent. Rayagada has a sex ratio of 1,048 females to 1,000 males, and a literacy rate of 50.88 percent. 15.18% of the population lives in urban areas. Scheduled Castes and Scheduled Tribes make up 14.41% and 55.99% of the population respectively.

Languages of Rayagada district (2011)
1. Odia (41.6%)
2. Kui (33.4%)
3. Telugu (10.4%)
4. Sora (8.37%)
5. Kuvi (3.27%)
6. Others (2.93%)

At the time of the 2011 Census of India, 41.64% of the population in the district spoke Odia, 33.36% Kui, 10.43% Telugu, 8.37% Sora, 3.27% Kuvi and 0.66% Hindi as their first language.

The district's tribal population is 57.52 percent of the total. Its 11 blocks have been covered by a tribal sub-plan, with three micro-projects in operation for pre-literate indigenous tribal communities. Rayagada's topography helps the tribal communities maintain their cultural identity; 4,785.36 square kilometres (1,847.64 sq mi) is forested, 777.27 square kilometres (300.11 sq mi) of which is reserved forest. Its predominant tribes are the Khonds and the Soras.

== Points of interest ==
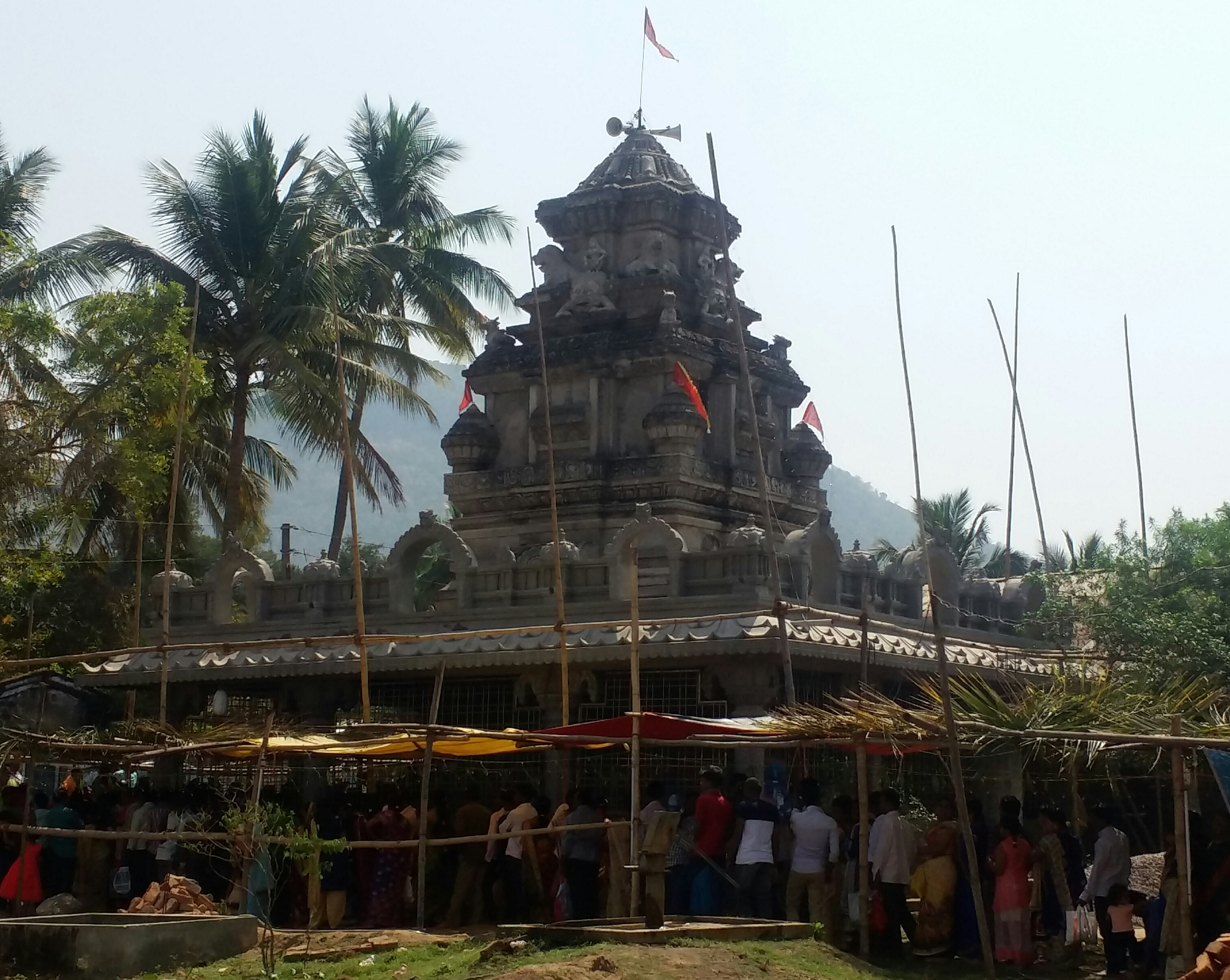
Bhimashankara temple in Bhimapura

- Majhighariani Temple in Rayagada
- Jagannath Temple, at the market on the south side of Rayagada, is near Majhighariani Temple.
- Laxminarayan temple was built by Indian Metals and Ferro Alloys in Therubali.
- Paikapada, near Therubali, is known for its Pataleshwar Shiva temple.
- Chatikona, a small village 48 kilometres (30 mi) from Rayagada, is known for its Shiva temple and waterfalls.
- Maa Markama Temple at Bissamcuttack is the only shrine (Shakta pithas) of Devi Maa Markama and Maa karkama in the Indian state of Odisha and known for its history and also mentioned in Saraladas's Chandi Purana.
- Minajhola, a village near Gudari, is known for its Shiva temple at the confluence of three rivers: the Vamsadhara, the Chauladhua and the Phalaphalia.
- The Devagiri hill, 50 kilometres (31 mi) from Rayagada, near Kalyan Singhpur, is 120 metres (390 ft) and has 476 steps.
- Kumudabali, a small village, is known for its Balunkeswar Shiva temple on the Vamsadhara River. The nearest railway station is in Muniguda, 60 kilometres (37 mi) from Rayagada.
- Padmapur, 90 kilometres (56 mi) from Rayagada, is known for the Nilakantheswar Temple. According to historian Satyanarayana Rajguru, the temple housed the 6th- or 7th-century Buddhist philosopher Dharmakirti.
- The Hanging Bridge at Chekaguda, over the Nagavali River, is Odisha's second simple suspension bridge.
- The Bhimasankar temple in Bhimpur, 100 kilometres (62 mi) from Rayagada and 30 kilometres (19 mi) from Gunupur, is one of India's 12 Jyotirlingas.
- The three-day Chaiti Festival, from 27 to 29 December in Rayagada, celebrates tribal art and culture.
- Parsali, a habitat of Dangariya Kandha, a PVTG tribe. One has to take a diversion from Chatikona, before Bissam Cuttack. For serene and picturesque greenery Niyamagiri Hills.

== Education ==
Govind Chandra Dev (Zilla) High School, founded in 1938, is one of the district's oldest high schools. Government Girls' High School, in Rayagada, was founded in 1964. A primary school was founded at the Thakkar Bapa Ashram in 1958 for tribal students. The Jawahar Navodaya Vidyalaya of Rayagada and Kendriya Vidyalaya Rayagada are two central government boarding school in Rayagada. There are many Odisha Adarsha Vidyalaya (OAV) and welfare high schools and a EMRS strengthening district's eduacation system.

Rayagada Autonomous College, Model Degree College, Rayagada and Gunupur College, Gunupur are the main degree colleges in the district. The Utkal Gourav Madhusudan Institute of Technology is an engineering school. The Gandhi Institute of Engineering and Technology is in Gunupur. College of Nursing www.chbmck.org affiliated with Berhampur University, managed by the Christian Hospital, Bissam Cuttack offers B.Sc. Nursing program.

== Notable people ==
1. Ritesh Agarwal - Indian billionaire entrepreneur
2. Purnachandra Bidika - Indian powerlifter (born 1957)
3. Harish Chandra Buxipatra - former Odisha State Cabinet Minister and Indian politician
4. Giridhar Gamang - Indian politician and former Chief Minister of Odisha
5. Mangei Gomango - Tribal activist, linguist and inventor of the Saura Sorang Sompeng Script
6. Magai Majhi - Indian Kho Kho player
7. Tapan Misra - Indian Scientist at ISRO
8. Raghunath Panigrahi - Odissi music Guru, musical artist
9. Nagbhushan Patnaik - Communist Revolutionary and Indian politician
10. N. Bhaskar Rao - Indian politician and industrialist
11. Saptagiri Sankar Ulaka - Indian tribal leader and Member of Lok Sabha
12. Rama Yedavalli - American engineering professor
