= Paikapada, Rayagada =

Pataleswar shiva temple at Paikapada
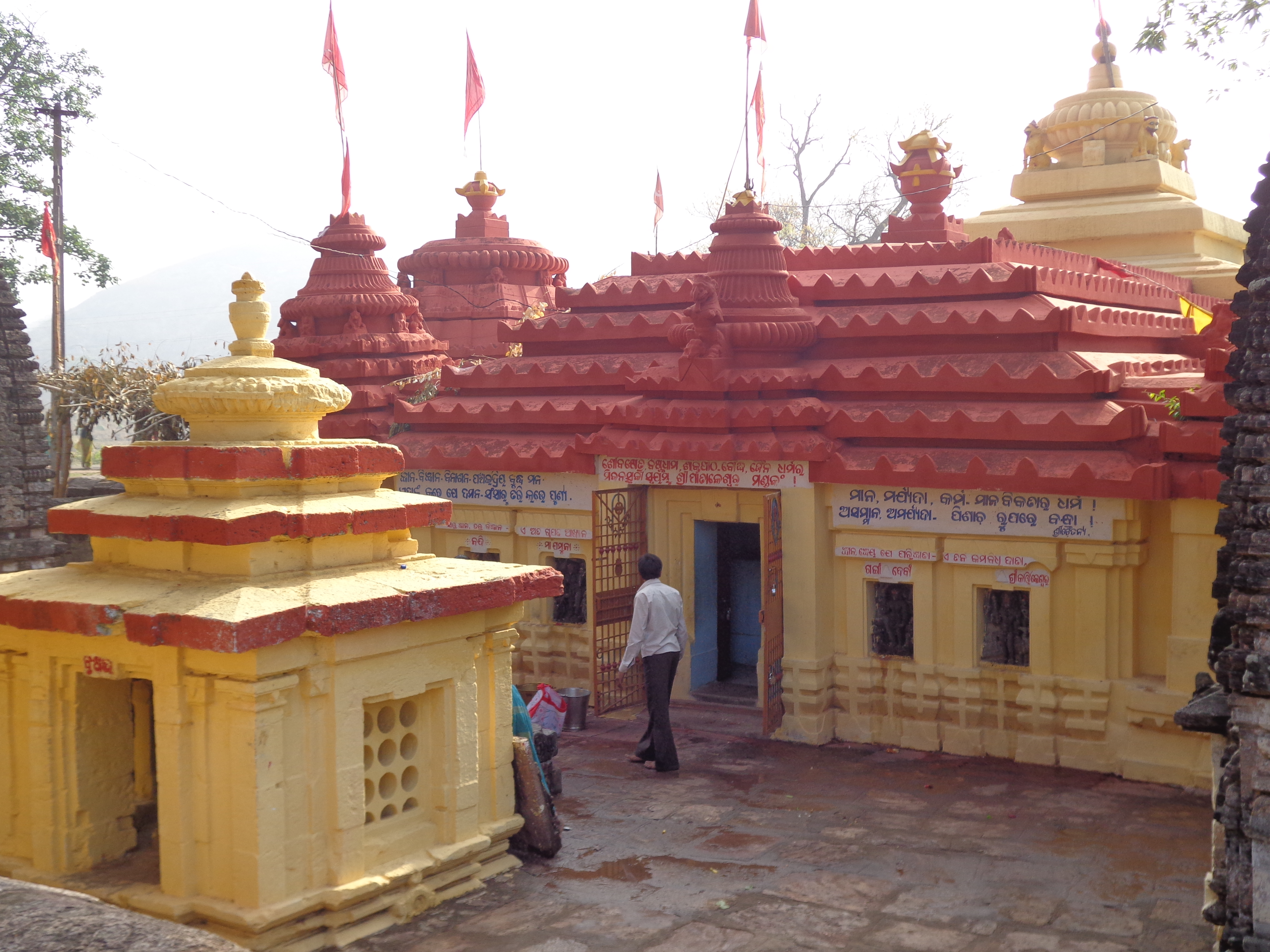

- Location in Odisha

Religion
- Affiliation: Hinduism
- District: Rayagada district
- Deity: Lord Pataleswar
- Festival: Shivaratri

Location
- Location: Paikapada
- State: Odisha
- Country: India
- Coordinates: 19°19′43″N 84°55′18″E

Architecture
- Completed: 9th century A.D.

Paikapada is located near Therubali in the Rayagada district, in the Indian state of Odisha. It is most famous for the Pataleshwar Shiva temple, one of the tourist attractions of the district. It was built by Danaranva Deva of Eastern Ganga Dynasty of Mukhalinga Kataka near Paralakhemundi.

== Geography ==
Paikapada is located at 19°19′43″N 84°55′18″E

== History ==
Paikpada is famous for its Pataleshwar Shiva temple, which dates back to the 9th century. It is believed that there are 99,99,999 Shiva lingams (only one less than one crore) in and around the shrine. Lord Jagannath, Maa Dakhineswari Kalika, and Chamunda are the most common deities worshiped here. People from far and near visit the shrine during the festival of Shivaratri and Rathyatra.

A rock inscription in Brahmi script found at the Pataleswar temple commemorates the Eastern Ganga dynasty and the Suryavansha dynasty kings in Rayagada.
