= Chaiti Festival, Rayagada =

Annual festival in Odisha, India

"Chaiti" Rayagada Mahotsav
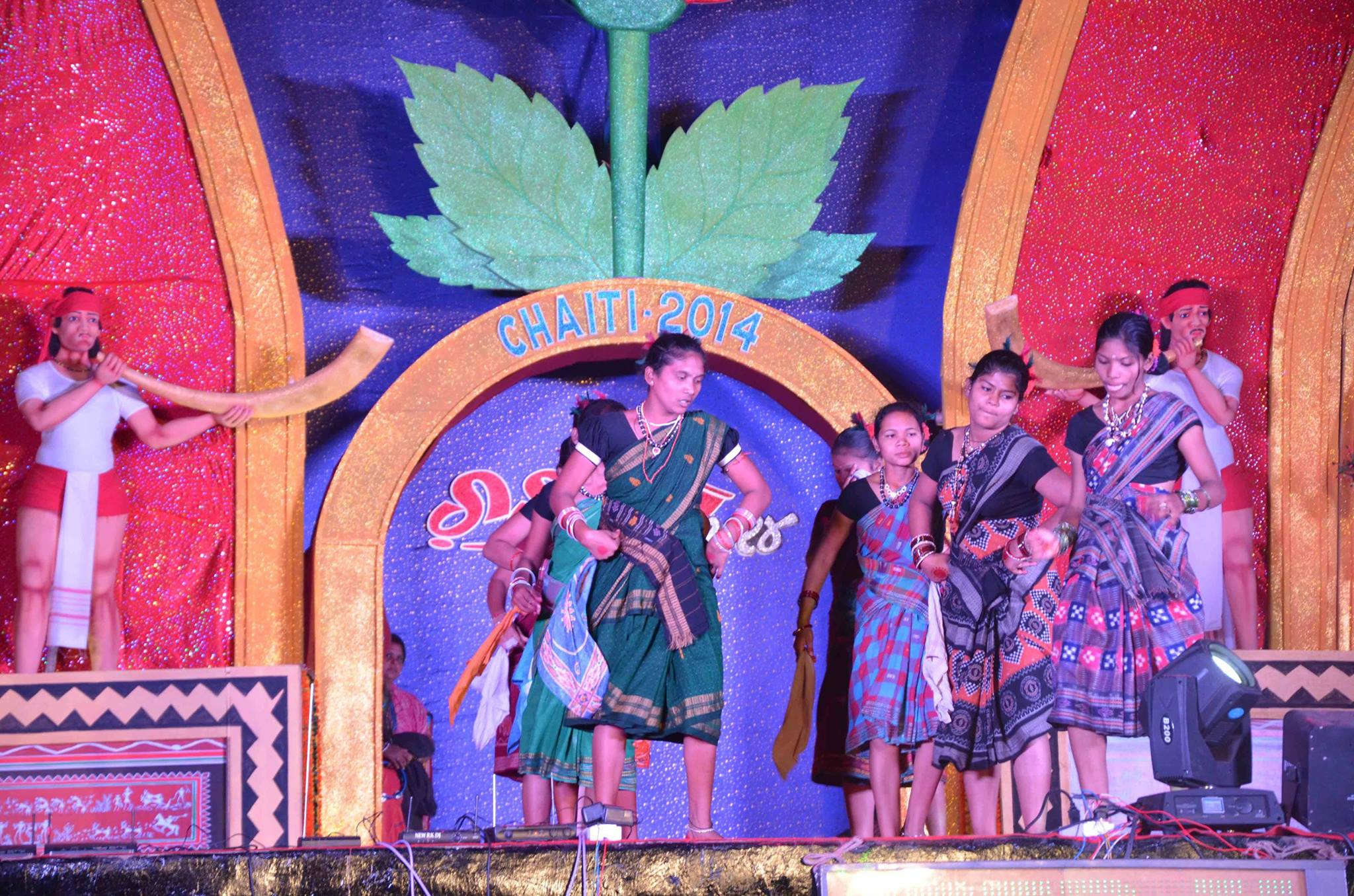
- Chaiti-2014
- Type: Oriya
- Celebrations: Cultural Programmes
- Begins: 27 December
- Ends: 29 December
- Frequency: annual

"Chaiti Festival" or "Rayagada Mahotsav" is the official annual mass cultural festival of Rayagada district, India. It is one among the major tourist attractions in the district.

== History ==
The festival started in 2005 in the district to give a boost to tribal culture. The cultural fest is observed in the Block levels and Sub divisional levels in addition to the district level. The first Chaiti Festival was organised as a mass festival by the then District Magistrate Dr. Pramod Kumar Meherda. Since then Chaiti festival has been organised every year. But for some reason it was discontinued during 2008. In 2009, Shri K.G.Mahapatra, the then Collector of the district revived the tradition.

== Observance ==
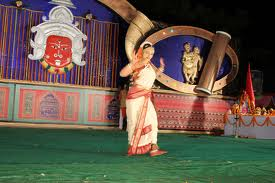
Chaiti Festival Rayagada

The festival is observed during the last three days of the year at the GCD High School ground by the District Council of Culture (DCC), Rayagada. The extravaganza showcasing the best of tribal art & culture of the district, with more than 500 artists across the country, is the main attraction in the festival. Very often the festival is followed by the Pallishree Mela of Orissa Rural Development & Marketing Society (ORMAS).
