= Bhimashankar Jyotirlinga (Dakinyam), Bhimpur =

Bhimashankar Jyortilinga (Dakinyam) temple, Bhimpur
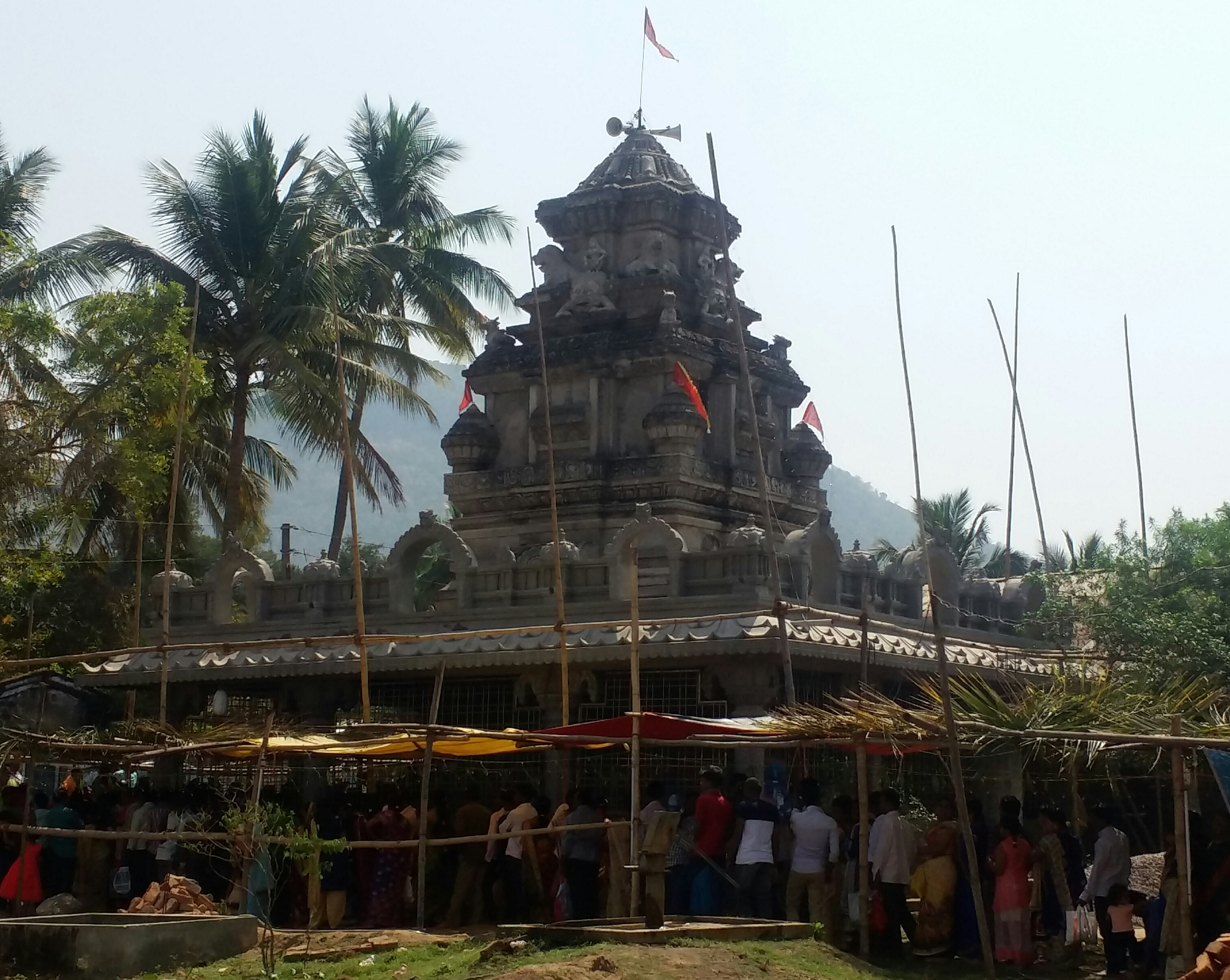
- Bhimashankar Jyortilinga (Dakinyam) temple, Bhimpur

- Location within Odisha

Religion
- Affiliation: Hinduism
- District: Rayagada district
- Deity: Shiva
- Festival: Shivratri

Location
- State: Odisha
- Country: India
- Interactive map of Bhimashankar Jyortilinga (Dakinyam) temple, Bhimpur
- Coordinates: 19°09′32.75″N 83°55′04.07″E

Architecture
- Elevation: 91 m (299 ft)

Website
- https://www.bhimashankar-jyotirlinga.in

Bhimashankar Jyotirlinga (Dakinyam), Bhimpur, is a Hindu temple situated in the western part of the holy Mahendragiri mountains on the Mahendratanaya River in the Indian state of Odisha. It is debated to be the Dakini area and the Jyotirlingam found there is believed to be one among the 12 Jyotirlingams.

== History ==
According to Linga Purana written by Vedavyasa and as translated by Babaji Baishnaba Chrana Das in Odia, one of the 12 jyotirlingams is in Dakinye Bhima shankara. As described in Mahabharata and as believed by many historians, Dakini is between the western part of Mahendragiri River to Godavari River. It is believed that in the Dvadasha jyotirlinga strotram of Shankaracharya the words "Dakinyam Bhimasankara" refers to the Dakini area.

The specialty of the Jyotirlingam is the quadrangular Shakti around the Linga decorated by a Upavita as per the purana. This place came into light after it was excavated in the year 1974. The nearby Machha Diian (Jumping fish)Odia: ମାଛଡିଆଁ waterfall in Mahendra tanaya river attract devotees as well as tourists throughout the year.

== Geography ==
Bhimashankar Jyotirlinga temple is about 30 kilometres (19 mi) from Gunupur and at a distance of 100 kilometres (62 mi) from the district headquarter Rayagada and located near the sangam of Mahendratanaya river and Vamsadhara.
