= Muniguda =

- Town
- Location in Odisha, India
- State: Odisha

Government
  - Type: Democratic
- Elevation: 355 m (1,165 ft)

Population
  - Total: 66,000

Languages
  - Official: Odia
- Time zone: UTC+5:30 (IST)
- PIN: 765020
- Telephone code: 91-6863
- Vehicle registration: OD
- Website: www.muniguda.com

Muniguda, located 60 km from Rayagada, is a town in the Rayagada district in the Indian state of Odisha.

The population of Muniguda is approximately 66,000 as per Census India report 2011.

== Major industries ==
Vedanta Alumina Ltd. is the recent major industrial project near Muniguda catering to all the developments in commercial domain.
