= Gudari, Rayagada =

Gudari
- Town
- Location in Odisha, India Gudari (India)
- Coordinates: 19.35°N 83.78°E
- Country: India
- State: Odisha
- District: Rayagada

Government
  - Type: N.A.C.
  - Body: Gudari Notified Area Council
- Elevation: 125 m (410 ft)

Population (2021)
  - Total: 16,708

Languages
  - Official: Odia
- Time zone: UTC+5:30 (IST)
- Postal code: 765026
- Vehicle registration: OD 18
- Website: odisha.gov.in

Gudari is a town and a Notified Area Council (N.A.C.) in Rayagada district in the Indian state of Odisha. Gudari got the Status of N.A.C in 1972.It is the 3rd biggest town in Rayagada District followed by Rayagada and Gunupur in 1st and 2nd .As of Latest India census,[3] Gudari has a population of 16,708

Gudari is the parent Village for around 100 of its small villages around it such as Bainaguda, siriguda, MKrai, Baliguda etc. Shri Minajhola is the nearest Tourist place near Gudari which attracts thousands of devotees during Shivratri. This Town had contributed and still giving birth to many Chartered Accountants, doctors, lawyers, engineers, MBAs, MCAs, Diploma holders, Teachers etc..

== Geography ==
Gudari is located at 19.35°N 83.78°E. It has an average elevation of 125 metres (410 feet).

Gudari is a town and a Notified Area Council (NAC) in Rayagada district in the Indian state of Odisha. This town is known for its natural beauty, and is surrounded by rivers, trees, waterfalls and hills. Gudari is connected with the outer world throughout the year. This place is known for Maa Manikeswari temple, Jagannath Temple and various religious places. One of the best places where a conglomeration of Oriya and Telugu culture is found.

A science college is there for intermediate and Science Degree college for Graduation. The Vamsadhara River flows through the town of Gudari. A number of temples such as Lord Shiva, Kanak Durga, Kanika Parameswai, lord Venketeswar, Bhandar Gharani, Lord Krishna, lord Jagannath in the town shows the tradition and belief towards God and a bless for the people of Gudari.

== Demographics ==
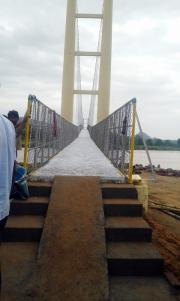
Gudari Hanging Bridge

As of Latest India census, Gudari had a population of 16,708. It consists of 14 Panchayats around the town. Males constitute 50% of the population and females 50%. Gudari has an average literacy rate of 60%, higher than the national average of 59.5%: male literacy is 70%, and female literacy is 51%. In Gudari, 12% of the population is under 6 years of age. Agriculture, state government services and business plays as major source of income for the people of Gudari
