= Rayagada =

- Town
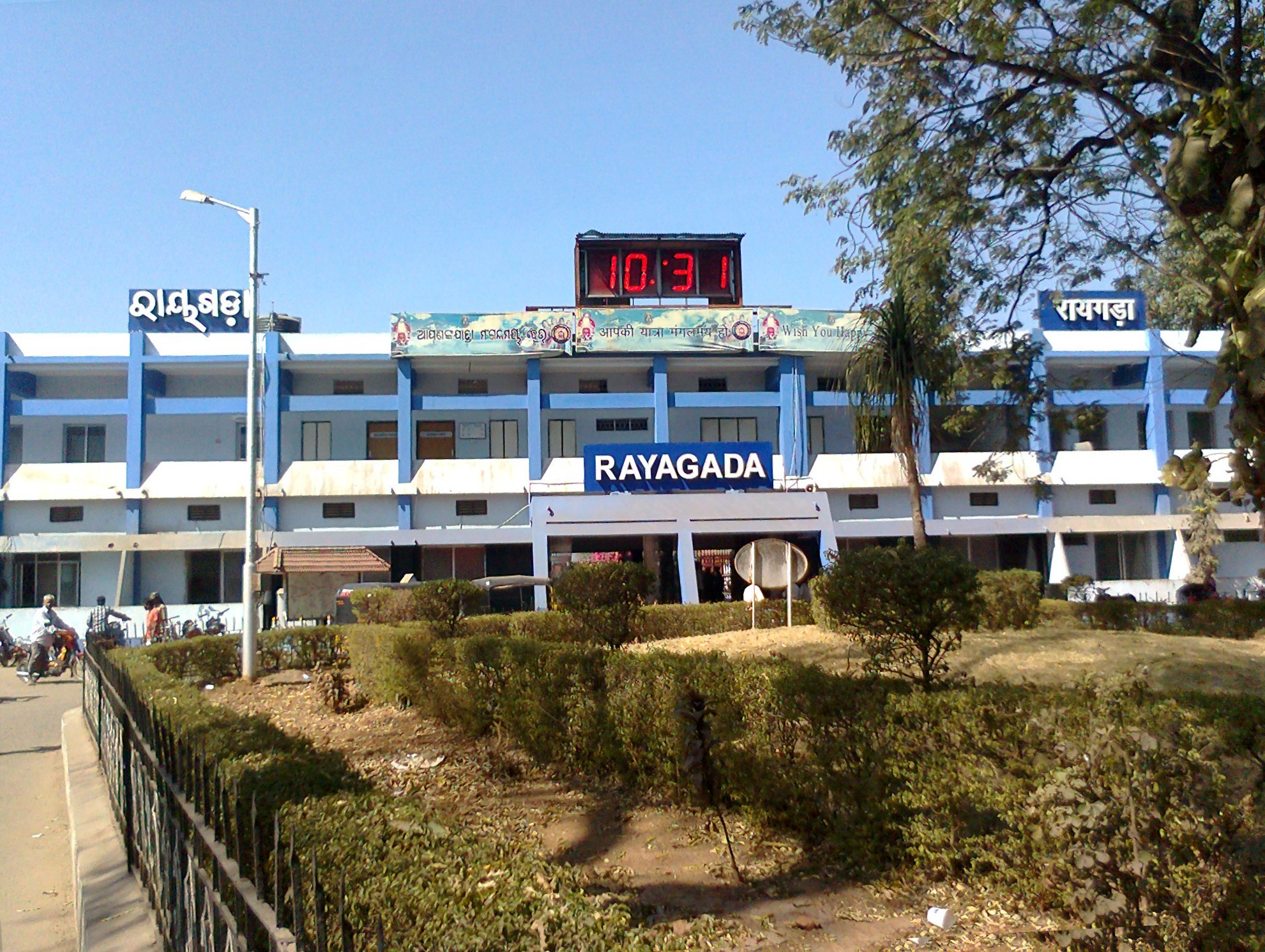
- Rayagada Railway Station

- Location in Odisha, India Rayagada (India)
- Coordinates: 19.17°N 83.42°E
- Country: India
- State: Odisha
- District: Rayagada
- Established: 1545
- Founder: Vishwanath Dev Gajapati

Government
  - Type: Municipality
  - Body: Rayagada Municipality
  - Member of Legislative Assembly: Kadraka Appala Swamy, INC
- Elevation: 207 m (679 ft)

Population (2011)
  - Total: 71,208

Languages
  - Official: Odia
- Time zone: UTC+5:30 (IST)
- PIN: 765001
- Telephone code: 06856
- Vehicle registration: OD-18
- Website: https://rayagada.odisha.gov.in

Rayagada is a municipality in Rayagada district in the Indian state of Odisha. It is the administrative headquarters of Rayagada district.

== History ==
The city of Rayagada was founded by King Vishwanath Dev Gajapati (1527-1531 CE) of the Suryavansh dynasty of Nandapur Kingdom. It served as the capital of an extensive dominion that stretched from the confines of Bengal to Telangana in the south and was a great center of trade and commerce in the coastal regions of the country. There was also a fort constructed by the king and a row of shrines built along the river Nagavali including the temple of Majhighariani Temple who was considered the guardian deity of the place. Until 1947, the city was in the domains of the Jeypore Maharajahs.

== Demographics ==
As of 2001 India census, Rayagada had a population of 57,732. Males constitute 51% of the population and females 49%. In Rayagada, 12% of the population is under 6 years of age. The population of Rayagada town as per 2011 census is 71,208 out of which male population is 36,036 and female population is 35,172.Rayagada has an average literacy rate of 64%, lower than the national average of 74.4%: male literacy is 72%, and female literacy is 56%

== Notable people ==
- Purnachandra Bidika, a gold medalist in Asian Power lifting Championship
- Varun Sandesh, an actor in Tollywood films
- Ritesh Agarwal, the current CEO and the founder of Oyo rooms

== Politics ==
The current MLA from Rayagada (ST) assembly constituency is Kadraka Appala Swamy(INC). Previous MLAs from Rayagada (ST) Assembly Constituency include Makaranda Muduli, an independent candidate, who won the seat in State elections in 2019 and Lalbihari Himirika of BJD who won this seat in 2000. After serving as deputy speaker of Odisha assembly, he was serving as a cabinet minister for SC and ST development minister.

Rayagada is part of Koraput (Lok Sabha constituency). Shri Jayram Pangi (Biju Janta Dal) won the general election 2009 defeating Dr. Giridhar Gomango (INC) who represented this constituency 9 times. Jhina Hikaka who won in 2014 elections. Current MP is Shri Saptagiri Sankar Ulaka from INC.

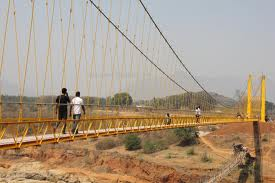
Hanging (Jhula) Bridge at Chakagudda, Rayagada

Currently N. Bhaskar Rao has been elected to Rajya Sabha from Rayagada.

== Education ==
- Divine Public School
- Maharshi Vidya Mandir
