= Bissam Cuttack =

Bissam Cuttack Bishamakataka
- Town
- Location in Odisha, India Bissam Cuttack (India)
- Coordinates: 19.52°N 83.52°E
- Country: India
- State: Odisha
- District: Rayagada

Government
  - Body: Bissam Cuttack N.A.C.
- Elevation: 342 m (1,122 ft)

Population (2011)
  - Total: 7,408

Languages
  - Official: Odia, English
- Time zone: UTC+5:30 (IST)
- Postal code: 765019
- Vehicle registration: OD
- Website: odisha.gov.in

Bissam Cuttack is a town and Notified Area Council in the Rayagada district of Odisha, India.

== Geography ==
Bissam Cuttack is located at 19.52°N 83.52°E. It has an average elevation of 342 m (1,122 ft). Bissam Cuttack is surrounded by the Niyamgiri Hills. Small canals like Markama Nala, Mundabandha Nala, Gate Nala and Rata Tikiri Nala surround the village in four directions.

== History ==
During the rule of Gangavansis (8th and 9th centuries) it was under the feudatory chief of Kalinga-Utkal empire Dadarnav Dev of Gudari katak. One stone scripture of 12th century, collected by heritage enthusiast and researcher Shri Sriranga Nayak of Bissam Cuttack, supports the statement. As per the research work done by Satyanarayana Rajguru, of Ganjam district and the then assistant of Kalinga Historical Research society, King Paramardin Dev (who was the ruler of the then Kalinga-Utkal) established a new sub-capital as well as a fort at Bissam Cuttack for better administration of the western- Utkal i.e. Phulbani and Kalahandi area. When the area was attacked frequently by the rulers of Chedi dynasty, he shifted the sub-capital to Gudari Katak from Bissam Cuttack. In the early part of 17th century Bissamcuttack estate or kingdom was founded by Mallu Mohanty of Karana caste who had migrated from Paralakhemundi, he won the confidence of the local Khonds who in turn elected him as their ruler, his royal status further strengthened and he started extracting feudal tax payments from his subjects, he also maintained a large military force of armed soldiers numbering over 1 thousand men. Descendants of Mohanty were the last estate holders of this “little kingdom” in the south west of Odisha. According to Anthropologist Schnepel, Rulers of Jeypore Estate had entered into a friendly alliance with the rulers of Bissamcuttack estate out of anxiety due to the growing influence of Mohanty’s reign in Bissamcuttack, succeeding rulers of Bissamcuttack estate were powerful local supporters of Jeypore estate and provided 800 soldiers/Paikas to Jeypore as a mark of support, however succeeding Raja of Bissamcuttack estate was rebellious and had refused to render military service to the kingdom out of defiance during the British rule which also resulted in a legal dispute between the Raja of Jeypore and Raja of Bissamcuttack estate. The next ruler of Bissamcuttack estate declared his estate an independent kingdom under the influence of his Brahman minister thus further escalating the conflict between the two kingdoms. These descendants of Mohanty were honoured as Thatraja/Rulers of Bissamcuttack kingdom.

== Demographics ==
As of 2001 India census, Bissam Cuttack had a population of 7407. Males constitute 50% of the population and females 50%. Bissam Cuttack has an average literacy rate of 67%, higher than the national average of 59.5%; with male literacy of 76% and female literacy of 58%. 11% of the population is under 6 years of age. The latest census report 2011 available in the Government of India website shows that the total population of the village is 7408 out of which male population is 3723 and the female population is 3685.Maa Markama is the prime Goddess of Bissam Cuttack.

Maa Markama Temple situated at the end of the village happens to be the only temple dedicated to the Goddess Markama in Odisha. The temple of 'Karkama' is situated beside the Temple of Maa Markama. There is a beautiful spring at Chatikona and Siva Temple beside it. Maa Markama College and Maa Markama degree college is the only college here. This college has NCC and NSS units. New Life English medium school, Navodaya School, Govt. High School, Saraswati Vidya Mandir are the educational institutes available. The Secondary training school now renamed as the District Institute of Educational Training, Rayagada at Bissam Cuttack is a well-known teacher training school in Odisha. Students from every nook and corner come to get training here each year. Bissam Cuttack also has a College of Nursing running B.Sc. Nursing course, GNM and ANM courses in the Christian Hospital Campus.

There is a JMFC court, Senior Civil Judge Court, Additional District Judge Court, a jail, and a fire station. Bissam Cuttack has a Government CHC and a Christian mission hospital known as Christian Hospital Bissamcuttack, which is a 200-bed hospital with various specialties such as Obstetrics and Gynecology, Surgery, Medicine, Pediatrics, Dental and Ophthalmology. Rath Yatra of Lord Jagannath is very famous. Ganesh Puja, Gajalaxmi Puja and Diwali are grandly celebrated. A personal museum cum library (in the name of Adikanda Sangrahalaya) with a good number of unpublished writings and some antique objects relating to the history of Bissam Cuttack, owned by Sri Sriranga Nayak (retd. Hindi teacher of Bissam Cuttack), is the first of its kind in Rayagada district. It has become a unique asset for research scholars in the country and abroad for their research work in the field of history as well as language.

== Temples of divinity ==
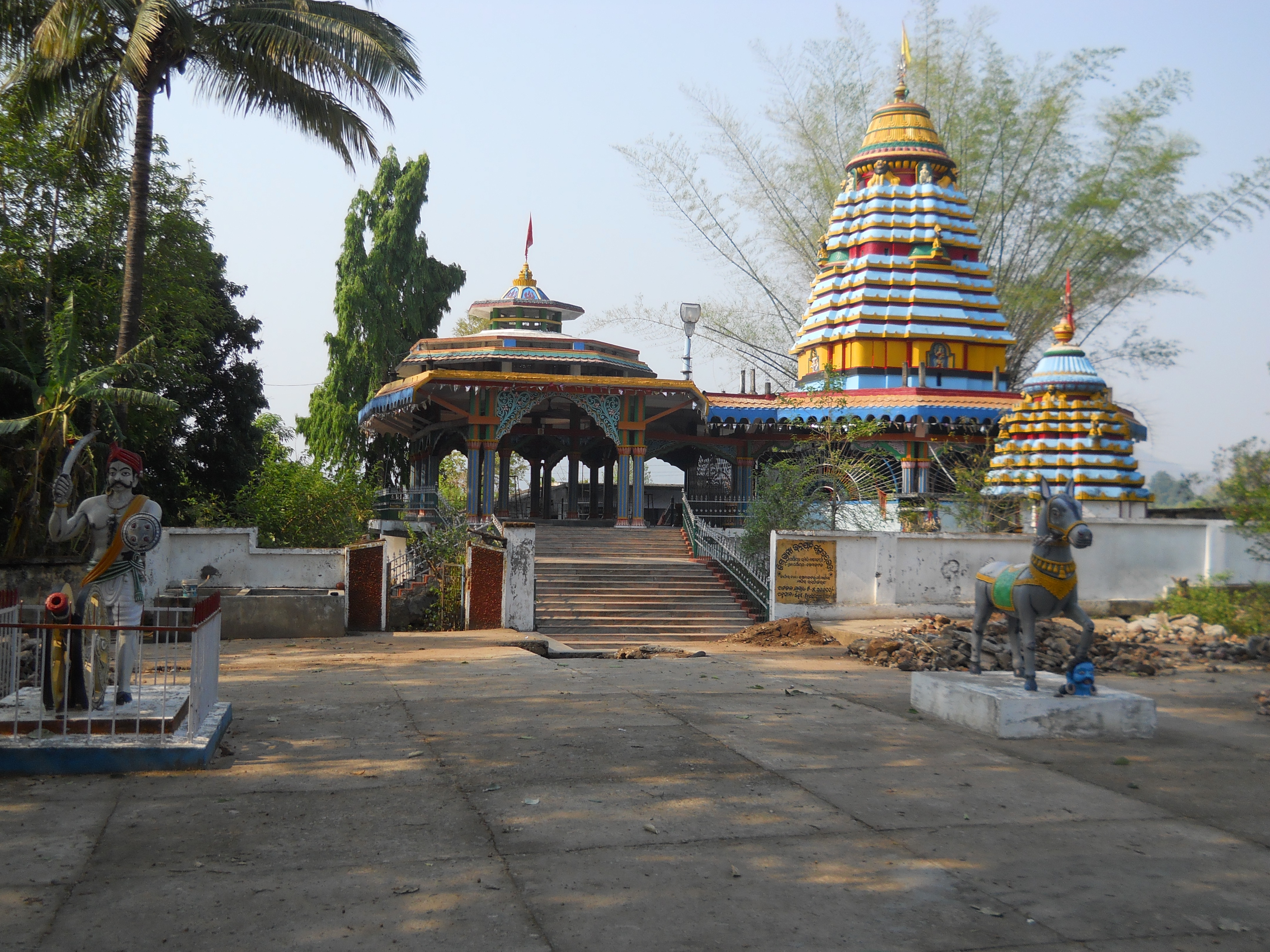
Maa Markama Temple in a new look at Bissam Cuttack

It is one of the identified Tourist Centres (scenic spot) of Odisha. A great number of temples enhance the cultural beauty of the town.

- The temple of Lord Jagannath by the main road
- The Maa Markama Temple by the main road. Bissamcuttack is well known in the state of Odisha as the only abode of Goddess Markama and Karkama
- The temple of Maa Karkama beside the temple of Maa Markama
- The temple of Grama devati by the main road
- The temple of Lord Shiva near the temple of Jagannath
- Another temple of Lord Shiva near Sishu Mandir
- The temple of Radhakanta by the main road
- The temple of Lord Hanuman near the Diet, Rayagada
- The temple of Gayatri near the temple of Jagannath,
- The Lord Rama temple beside the Rayagada-Bissamcuttack Road
- The Mahima temple of Bhimabhoi in front of Rama mandir,
- The temple of Lord Shiva near Chatikona, about 7 km away from Bissamcuttack
- The temple of Niyama Raja near Mundabandha Canal
- The temple of Sai Baba near the temple of Lord Jagannath
- The Lord Jagannath temple newly built in Durgi-odisha

== Politics ==
Current MLA from Bissam-Cuttack (ST) Assembly Constituency is Nilamadhab hikaka(won by: 29186 votes) of indian national congress, who won the seat in State elections of 2024 for the first time. Previous MLAs from this seat include urlaka who won this seat in 2019 through BJD.

Bissam-Cuttack is part of Koraput (Lok Sabha constituency).

== Notable people ==
- Ritesh Agarwal

== See also ==
- Hatamuniguda
