= Durgi =

Durgi may refer to:

- Durgi, Guntur district, India
- Durgi, Palnadu district, India
- Durgi, Rayagada district, India
- Durgi (film)
- Durgi (speech style) of sabras in Israel
