= Martin Uherek =

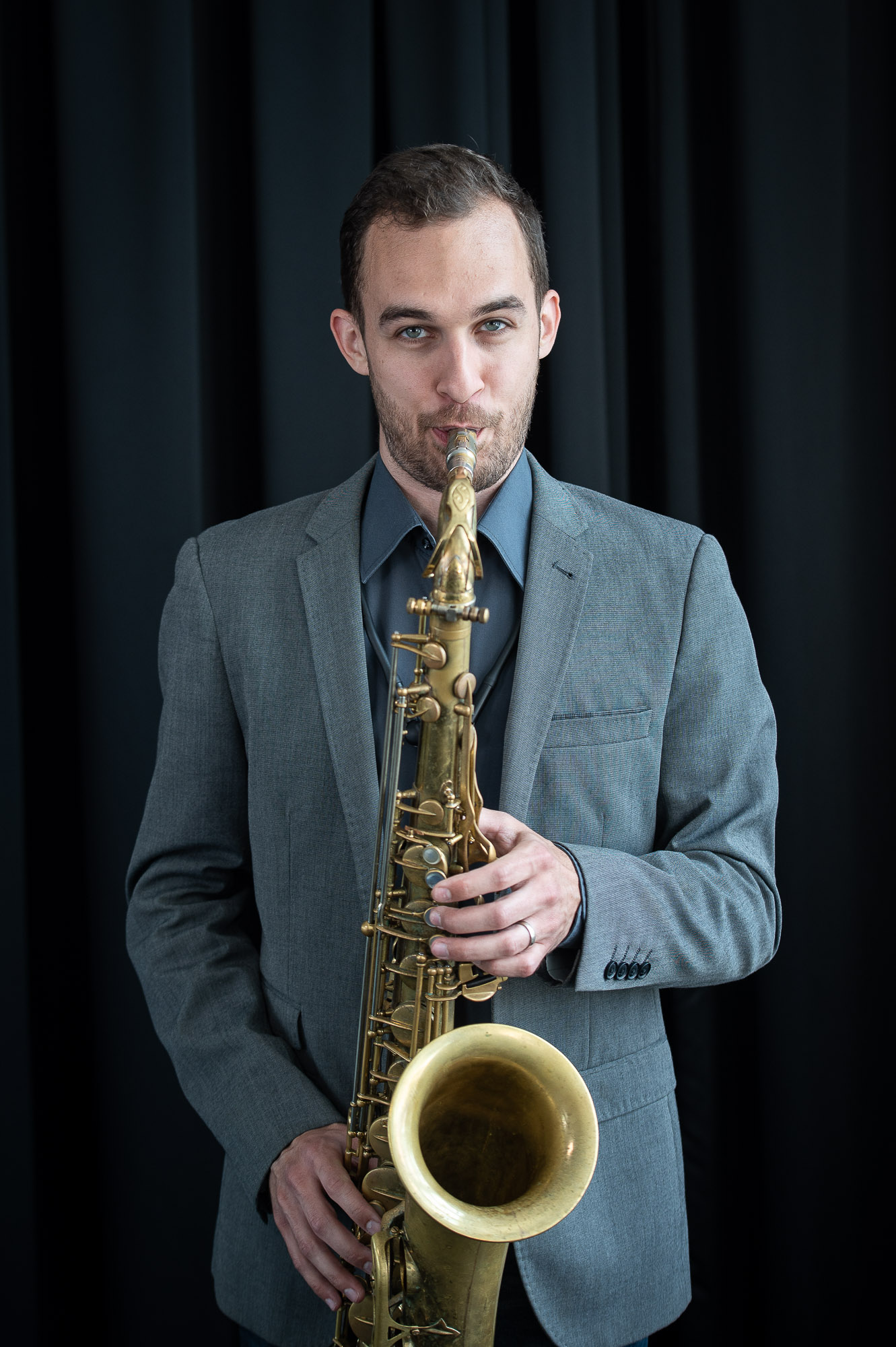
- Slovak jazz saxophonist Martin Uherek, 2023

Background information
- Born: Martin Uherek; September 22, 1987; Banská Bystrica, Slovakia
- Genres: Jazz, Bebop, Hard bop, swing, mainstream jazz, modern jazz
- Occupations: Saxophonist, Composer, Educator
- Instruments: Tenor saxophone, Soprano saxophone
- Years active: 2006–present
- Labels: Hudobný fond, Príbehy jazzu s.r.o.
- Website: martinuherek.com

Martin Uherek (born September 22, 1987) is a Slovak jazz saxophonist, composer, and educator. He is the founder of the educational concert-and-album series Príbehy jazzu (“Stories of Jazz”), active since 2013, and a co-leader with pianist Klaudius Kováč on the duo album Two Boddies (2025). His music is rooted in swing, bebop, and hard bop while drawing on modern jazz approaches.

== Early life and education ==
Uherek studied saxophone at the J. L. Bella Conservatory and the Academy of Arts in Banská Bystrica, including six years of jazz studies with pianist Klaudius Kováč.

== Career ==
=== Martin Uherek Quartet ===
In 2008 Uherek founded the Martin Uherek Quartet, initially with Peter Palaj (guitar), Róbert Ragan Jr. (double bass), and Pavol Blaho (drums). Pianist Jakub Tököly later replaced Palaj, forming the core line-up with bassist Peter Korman and drummer Blaho.

That year the group won 2nd place at the Tarnów International Jazz Contest in Poland, where Uherek also received a soloist award, and was named laureate of the Slovak competition New Faces of Slovak Jazz. In 2012 the quartet appeared at the Budapest Jazz Showcase, and the following year opened the main stage of Bratislava Jazz Days with the project Remembering Monk.

=== Príbehy jazzu (Stories of Jazz) ===
In 2013 Uherek founded the concert series Príbehy jazzu to present jazz history through spoken narration and performance. The project was issued on three albums: Príbehy jazzu (2016), Príbehy jazzu, vol. 2 – Ako vznikal jazz(2018), and Príbehy jazzu, vol. 3 – Začiatky moderného jazzu (2021). The third volume appeared among the public-vote nominees for the 2021 Esprit Jazz Awards.

=== Duo with Klaudius Kováč: Two Boddies ===
In 2025 Uherek and pianist Klaudius Kováč released the duo album Two Boddies on Príbehy jazzu s.r.o. The eleven tracks were recorded without rehearsals as a live dialogue between saxophone and piano.Slovak coverage noted its spontaneous interplay and chemistry, with Andy Middleton praising the duo’s “lifelong dedication to the jazz lineage” and “mature rhythmic feel.”

=== Other projects ===
In 2023 Uherek recorded with the saxophone ensemble Deus Sax Machina on the album Hommage to Arnošt Coufal, a tribute to Czech composer Arnošt Coufal. The project featured eight compositions titled Hommage à Sax Prelude and an additional track, “30 years.” Uherek contributed on tenor and alto saxophones alongside Nikola Bankov, Peter Dobai, and Erik Rothenstein.

== Discography ==
As leader

- Walkin’ My Own Way (Hudobný fond, 2015)
- Príbehy jazzu (PJ Sound Studio, 2016)
- Príbehy jazzu, vol. 2 – Ako vznikal jazz (PJ Sound Studio, 2018)
- Príbehy jazzu, vol. 3 – Začiatky moderného jazzu (PJ Sound Studio, 2021)
- Two Boddies (Príbehy jazzu s.r.o., 2025)

As collaborator

- with Deus Sax Machina: Hommage to Arnošt Coufal (Bebe Rebe, 2023)
- with Peter Korman: Root System (Music Fund Slovakia, 2019)
- with Peter Palaj: News For Peter (Music Fund Slovakia, 2019)
- with Matúš Jakabčic CZ–SK Big Band: Room #555 (JFJ, spol. s r. o. & La Plata Production s.r.o., 2022)
- with Matúš Jakabčic CZ–SK Big Band: A Day Off (LP Studio, 2025)
- with Juraj Bartoš: (N)evergreens II (FABART s.r.o., 2024)
