= Khambesi, Bissam Cuttack =

Khambesi Madhaba Bibhar
- village
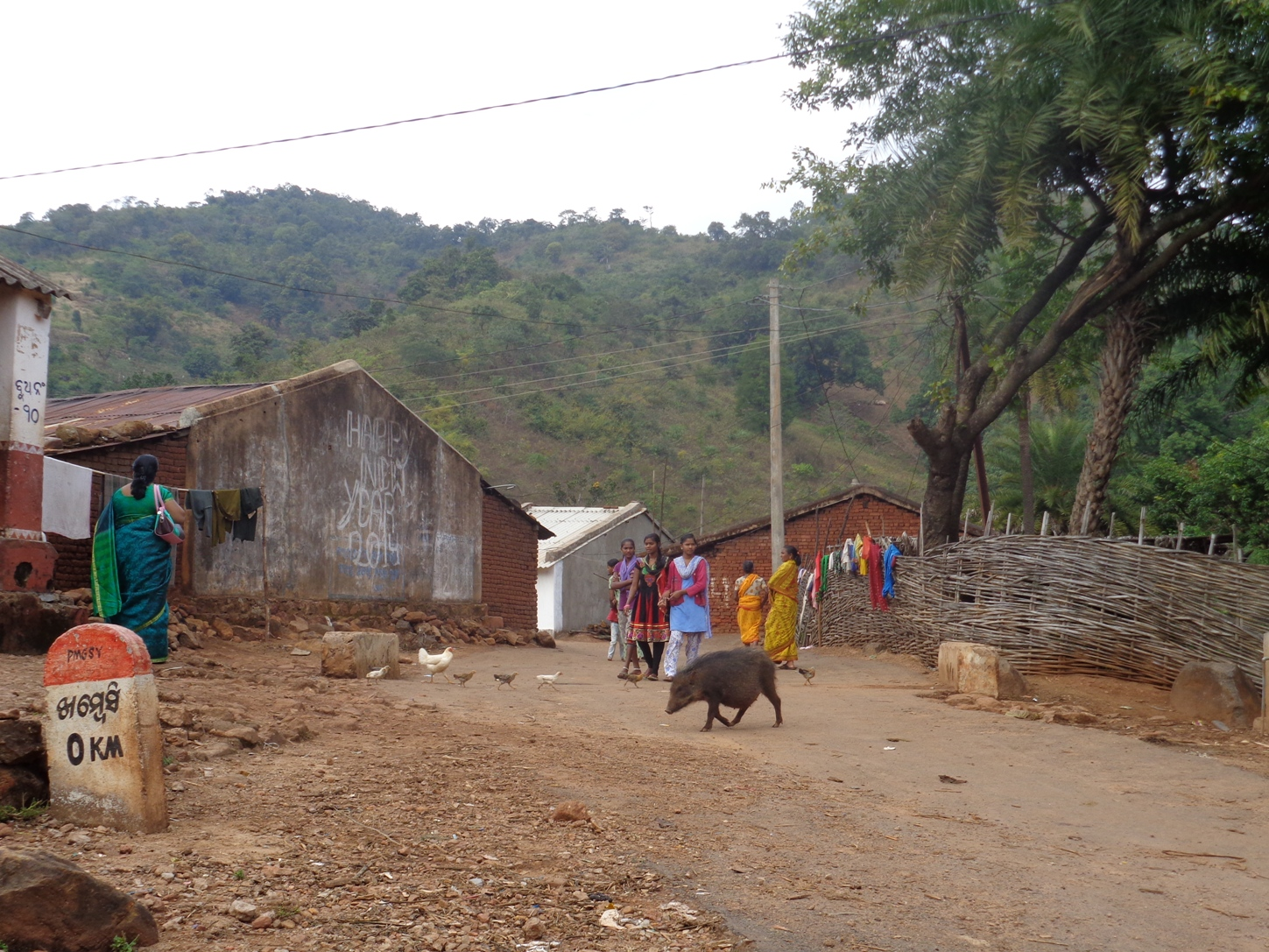
- Khambesi village at higher altitude

- Location in Odisha, India Khambesi (India)
- Coordinates: 19°39′00″N 83°24′00″E
- Country: India
- State: Odisha
- District: Rayagada

Government
  - Type: Democratic

Languages
  - Official: Oriya
- Time zone: UTC+5:30 (IST)
- PIN: 765019
- Vehicle registration: OD
- Website: odisha.gov.in

Khambesi is a small village in Bissam Cuttack Tahasil of Rayagada district in the state of Odisha, India dominated by Dongaria Tribe. The village came to limelight when the villagers through Gram Sabha voted against the joint venture of OMC and Vedant's for mining lease. Sri Jalandhar Pusika, a Dongaria of the village Khambesi is the first Graduate of the Tribe.

== Geography ==
Khambesi is situated about 83 km from the district headquarters i.e. Rayagada and 12 km from the Panchayat headquarters Kurli. Khambesi is situated at Lat.19° 39′N and Lon. 83° 24′E.

== Demography ==
Majority of the population at and nearby Khambesi are primitive tribals known as Dongaria kondha. As per census 2011 available in the "Official website of census india" the population of village is 896 of which 422 are males and 474 are females as per Population Census 2011.

== Tourist attractions ==
The village stands on a highest altitude in Rayagada district and is surrounded by the famous Niyamgiri hills in its four directions. The nearest place of tourist interest in Chatikona.
