= Maa Markama Temple =

Coordinates: 19.502949°N 83.510012°E

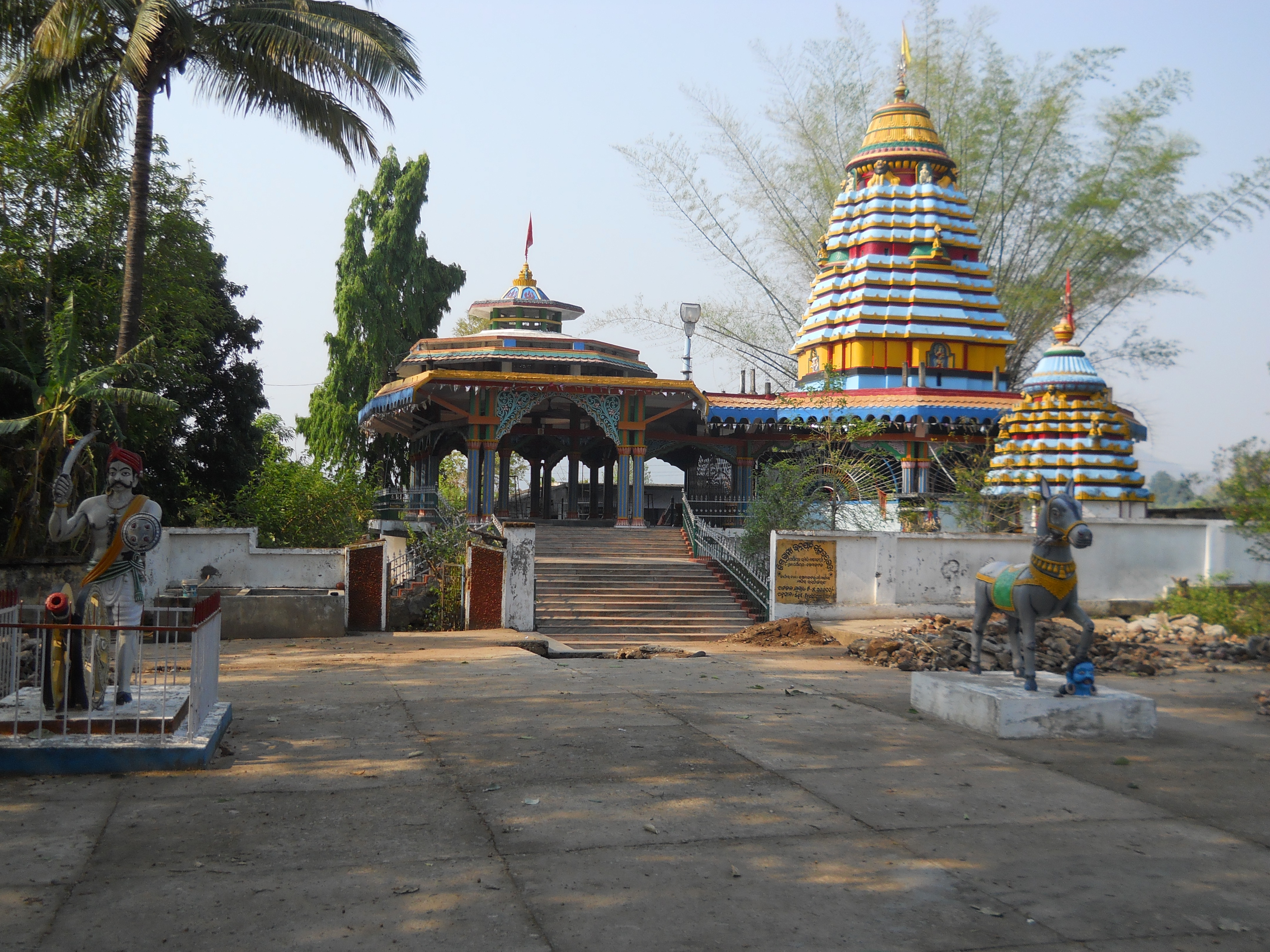
Maa Markama Temple in a new look at Bissam Cuttack

Maa Markama Temple located at Bissam Cuttack village of Rayagada district is a place of tourist interest. It is the only shrine (Shakta pithas) of Devi Maa Markama and Maa Karkama in the Indian state of Odisha. The temple of Maa Karkama (believed to be the sister of Maa Markama) is situated next to the temple of Maa Markama. The legend says that the Devi is being worshiped for centuries. However, the temple was constructed in the recent past. A junior college and a university college in Bissam Cuttack are named after Maa Markama. The temple is one of the places of tourist attractions in the Rayagada district. Dussehra and chaitra Paraba are celebrated every year at the temple. The nearest railhead is Chatikona, which is 7 km (4.34 miles) from Bissam Cuttack.

== History ==
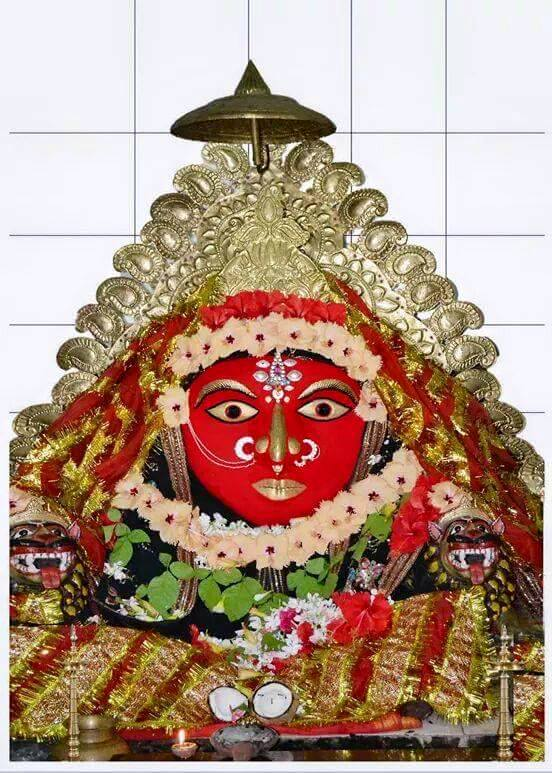
Goddess Markama of Markama Temple, Bissam Cuttack

Francesco Brighenti mentions that Goddess Markama is the tutelary deity of the Thatrajas (Rulers) of Bissam Cuttack estate, Mallu Mohanty of Karana community was the founder of this Kingdom whose descendants held the title of “Thatraja” and ruled the estate. The ritual of human sacrifice was prevalent here and was stopped during British rule. Yet the ritual of buffalo sacrifice continued, which was stopped by the then Regional officer Shri Gadhadhar Mishro(01.07.1953-19.03.1955). The mention of Devi Maa Markama can also be found in the CHANDI PURANA of Sarala Dash and also in BATA ABAKASH of Matta Balarama Dash. The Devi has been mentioned as Utkaleeya (Oriya for "of Odisha") jogini in mythological books. Several legends say that Devi Markama helped the King of Bissam Cuttack during a war by mesmerizing the enemy soldiers.
