= Orissa Mining Corporation v. Ministry of Environment and Forest and Others =

Orissa Mining Corporation v. Ministry of Environment & Forest & Others
- Court: Supreme Court
- Decided: 18 April 2013
- Citation: WP (Civil) No 180 of 2011

Court membership
- Judges sitting: Justice K.S. Radhakrishnan; Justice Aftab Alam; Justice Ranjan Gogoi

Keywords
- Constitution of India

Orissa Mining Corporation v. Ministry of Environment & Forest & Others is a landmark decision by the Supreme Court of India, which declared that Gram Sabha has a role to play in safeguarding the customary and religious rights of the STs and other Traditional Forest Dwellers (TFDs) like Dangaria Kondha etc. under the Forest Rights Act. The Apex Court maintained that the decision lies with the locals.

== Parties ==
Orissa Mining Corporation (OMC), a State of Odisha Undertaking was the Petitioner who approached the Apex Court seeking a Writ of Certiorari to quash the order dated 24.08.2010 passed by the Respondents i.e. Ministry of Environment and Forests (MOEF)and others.

== Bench ==
The case was heard before a three-judge bench of the Supreme Court, composed of Justice K.S. Panicker Radhakrishnan, Justice Aftab Alam (judge) and Justice Ranjan Gogoi. Justice Radhakrishnan had functioned as a Standing Counsel for a number of educational and social organizations and held appointments in the High Courts of Kerala, Jammu and Kashmir and Gujarat before his elevation to the Supreme Court.

== Judgement ==
=== Observations of the Apex Court ===
While disposing of the Writ Petition, the Apex Court, in Para 15 of the Judgement, observed as follows:

"The blatant disregard displayed by the project proponents with regard to rights of the tribals and primitive tribal groups dependant on the area for their livelihood, as they have proceeded to seek clearance is shocking. Primitive Tribal Groups have specifically been provided for in the Forest Rights Act, 2006 and this case should leave no one in doubt that they will enjoy full protection of their rights under the law. The narrow definition of the Project Affected People by the State Government runs contrary to the letter and spirit of the Forest Rights Act, 2006. Simply because they did not live on the hills does not mean that they have no rights there. The Forest Rights Act, 2006 specifically provides for such rights but these were not recognized and were sought to be denied."

=== Findings ===
In its judgment, the Court has directed that the State Government as well as the Ministry of Tribal Affairs, Government of India, would assist the Gram Sabhas for settling of individual as well as community claims. The Court accordingly directed in the concluding parts of the Judgment as follows:

Para. 60. We are, therefore, inclined to give a direction to the State of Orissa to place these issues before the Gram Sabha with notice to the Ministry of Tribal Affairs, Government of India and the Gram Sabha would take a decision on them within three months and communicate the same to the MOEF, through the State Government. On the conclusion of the proceeding before the Gram Sabha determining the claims submitted before it, the MoEF shall take a final decision on the grant of Stage II clearance for the Bauxite Mining Project in the light of the decisions of the Gram Sabha within two months thereafter.

Para. 61. The Alumina Refinery Project is well advised to take steps to correct and rectify the alleged violations by it of the terms of the environmental clearance granted by MoEF. Needless to say that while taking the final decision, the MoEF shall take into consideration any corrective measures that might have been taken by the Alumina Refinery Project for rectifying the alleged violations of the terms of the environmental clearance granted in its favour by the MoEF.

Para. 62. The proceedings of the Gram Sabha shall be attended as an observer by a judicial officer of the rank of the District Judge, nominated by the Chief Justice of the High Court of Orissa who shall sign the minutes of the proceedings, certifying that the proceedings of the Gram Sabha took place independently and completely uninfluenced either by the Project proponents or the Central Government or the State Government.

Para. 63. The Writ Petition is disposed of with the above directions. Communicate this order to the Ministry of Tribal Affairs, Gram Sabhas of Kalahandi and Rayagada Districts of Orissa and the Chief Justice of High Court of Orissa, for further follow up action.

== Implementation ==
In order to implement the directives of the Apex Court, 12 Gram Sabhas were held, seven in the district of Rayagada and five in the district of Kalahandi. In Rayagada district, the Gram Sabhas are slated to be held at villages namely Serajpadhi, Keskapadhi, Batodi, Khambesi, Jorapa, Lamba and Lakhpadar. Similarly, the villages identified for Gram Sabhas in Kalahandi district include Tadijhola, Palbari, Phuldeemer, Jurpa and Kunakada. Sri Sarat Chandra Miashra, District Judge, Rayagada has been nominated supervisor for the Gram Sabhas under Rayagada district and the District Judge of Kalahandi was the observer for other five Gram Sabhas held in Kalahandi district. All the Gram Sabhas voted against the Vedants's mining project. The victory of the Dangarias once more established the unique feature of real Democracy in which such a small tribe has been able to derail a major industrial project.
