= Chatikona =

- Village
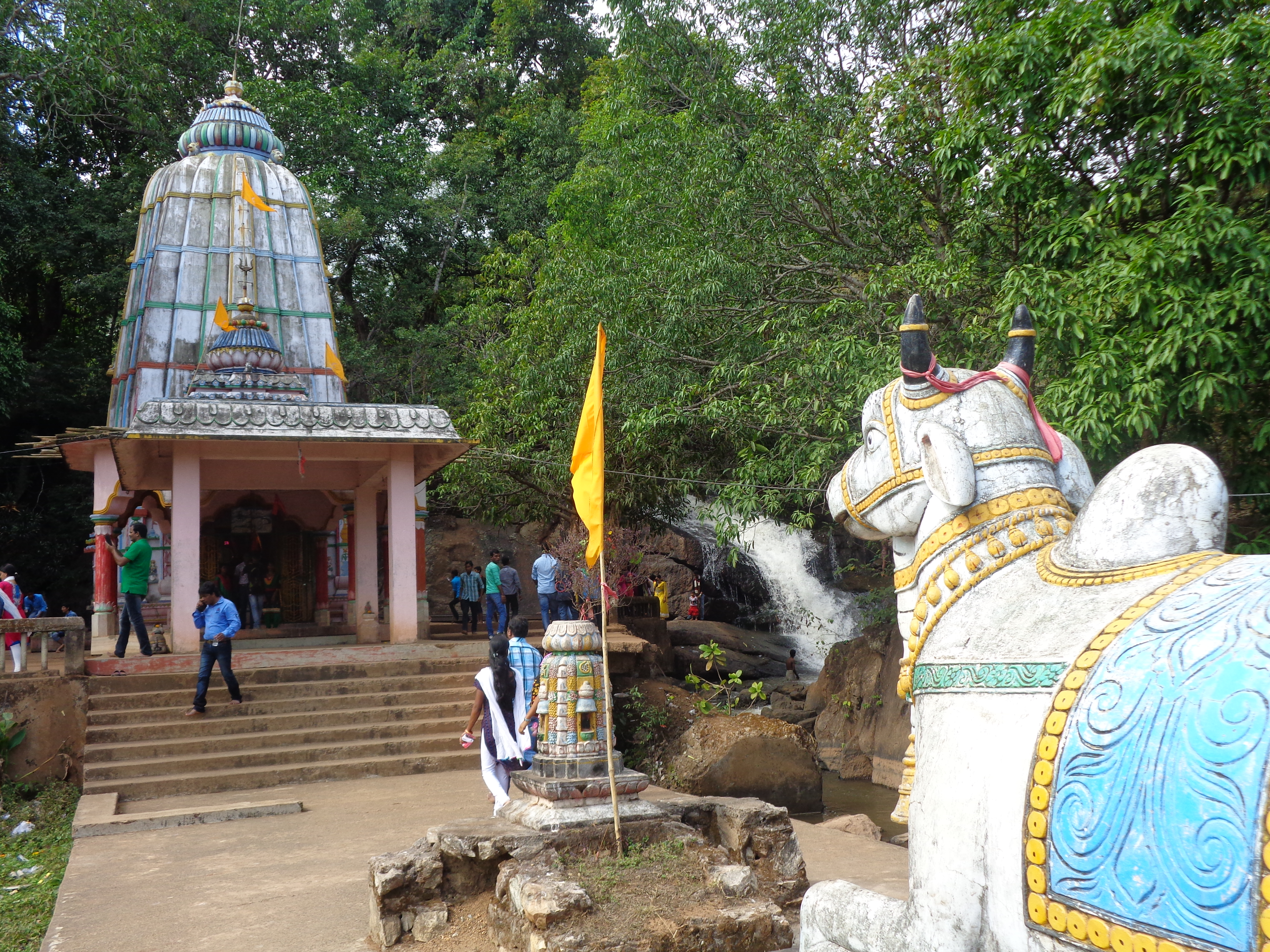
- Shiv Temple & Waterfall at Chatikana

- Location in Odisha, India Chatikona (India)
- Coordinates: 19°28′00″N 83°27′00″E
- Country: India
- State: Odisha
- District: Rayagada

Government
  - Type: Democratic

Languages
  - Official: Odia
- Time zone: UTC+5:30 (IST)
- PIN: 765019
- Vehicle registration: OD
- Website: odisha.gov.in

Chatikona is a small village of Rayagada district in the state of Odisha, India. It is one of the identified Tourist Centres (scenic spot) of Odisha.

== Introduction ==
The village is surrounded by the Niyamgiri hills in its three directions. Every year, on the festival of Maha Shivaratri, people from around Odisha come to visit this place as there is a Shiva (Lord Pataleswar) temple at Chatikona. Beside the temple of Lord Shiva is Chatikona Falls. Numerous waterfalls and streams flow from the hills of Niyamgiri. Bissam Cuttack railway station is, in fact, situated at Chatikona village and hence the village is well connected with railways.

== Geography ==
Chatikona is situated about 48 km from the district headquarters i.e. Rayagada. Chatikona is situated at lat.19° 28′N and lon. 83° 27′E. The nearest villages are Kurli, Khambesi, Kiyapadu and Khajuri.

== Demography ==
Majority of the population at and nearby Chatikona are primitive tribal known as Dongaria kondha. As per census 2011 available in the "Official website of census india" the population of Chatikona is 2183 out of which male population is 1067 and female population is 1116.

== Educational institutions ==
Maa Markama college, Bissamcuttack is the nearest college to Chatikona. Besides, the following educational institutions are situated at Chatikona.

- The Niyamgiri High School
- Govt. M.E.School
- Govt. U.P.School
- Railway U.P.School
- Ambedkar English Medium U.P.
- Nalini Vidya Mandira (Residential school) at Bariguda
- D.K.D.A. Ashrama School
- Saraswati Sishu Mandir

== Tourist attraction ==
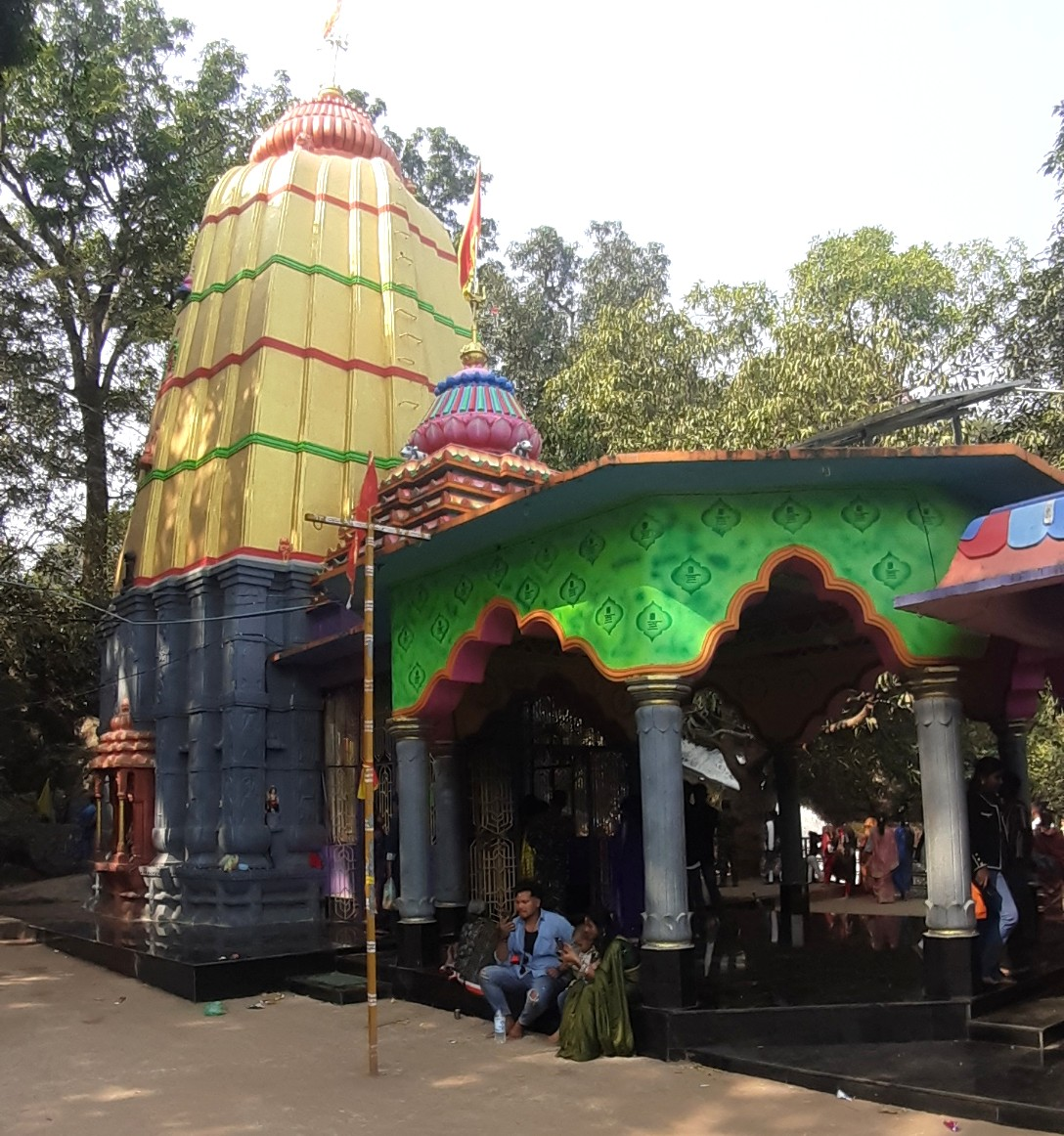
Pataleswar Siva Temple (renovated), Chatikona

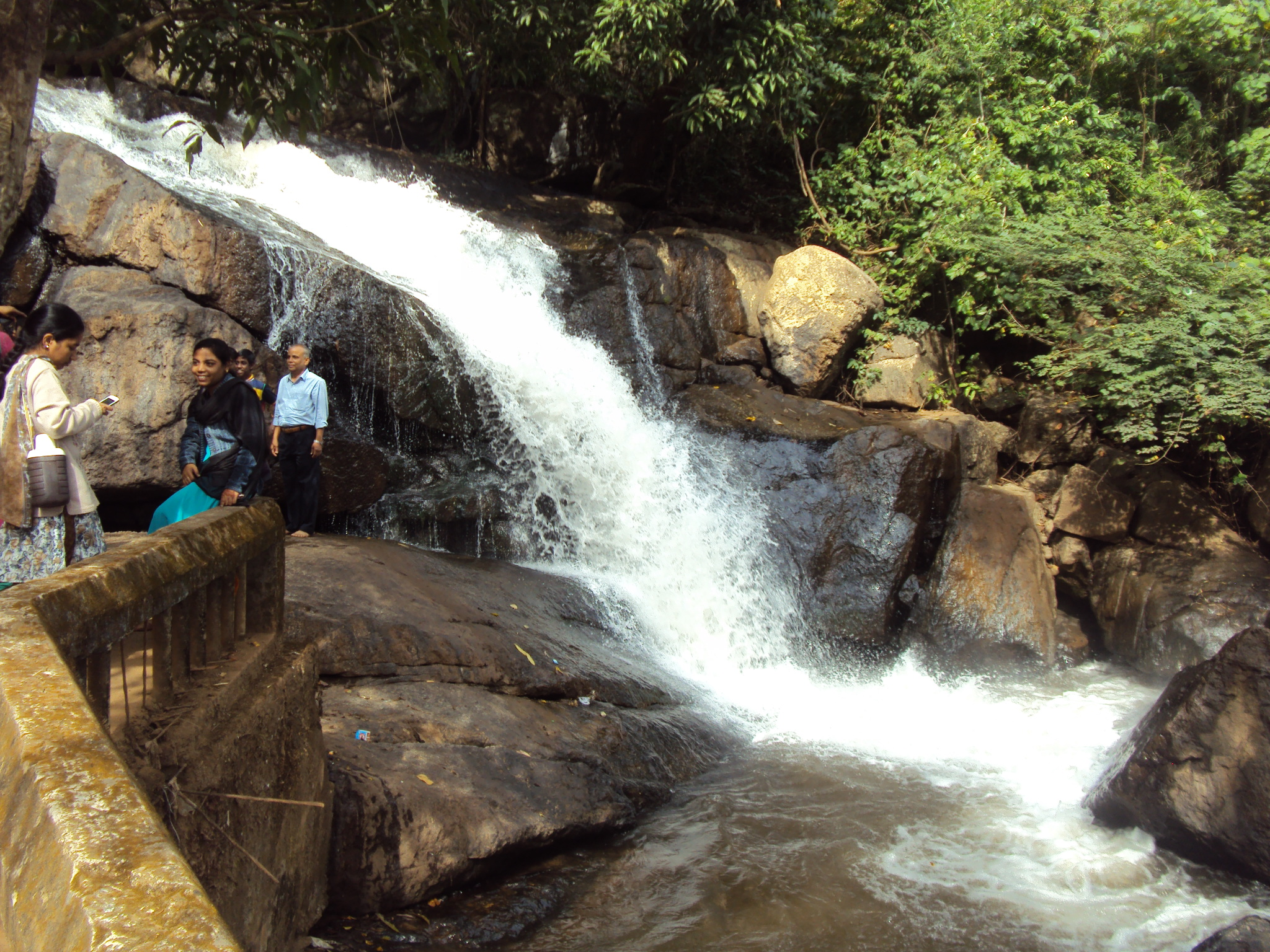
Water fall at Chatikona, Rayagada

The temple of Lord Shiva (Pataleswar) with a waterfall beside it is a picnic spot and a place of tourist attraction of in the Rayagada district. Besides, there is a tribal museum of Dongaria Kondha culture organized by D.K.D.A.CHATIKONA. An Oriya film namely Jianta Bhoota produced in 2011 by Akhaya Kumar Parija and directed by Prasanta Nanda which is based on the lives of Dongaria Kondha of this area won National Film Awards under National Film Award for Best Non-Feature Environment/Conservation/Preservation Film category.

Other tourist attractions in the area include the Maa Markama Temple, Laxminarayana Temple at Therubali and the Shiva temple at Paikapada, Rayagada. The weekly Wednesday market at Chatikona is also notable, where Dongaria Kondha and Desia Kondha villagers from the Niyamagiri area bring their produce to sell.

== See also ==
- List of waterfalls in India (Odisha)
