= Kiyapadu, Rayagada =

Kiyapadu
- Hamlet
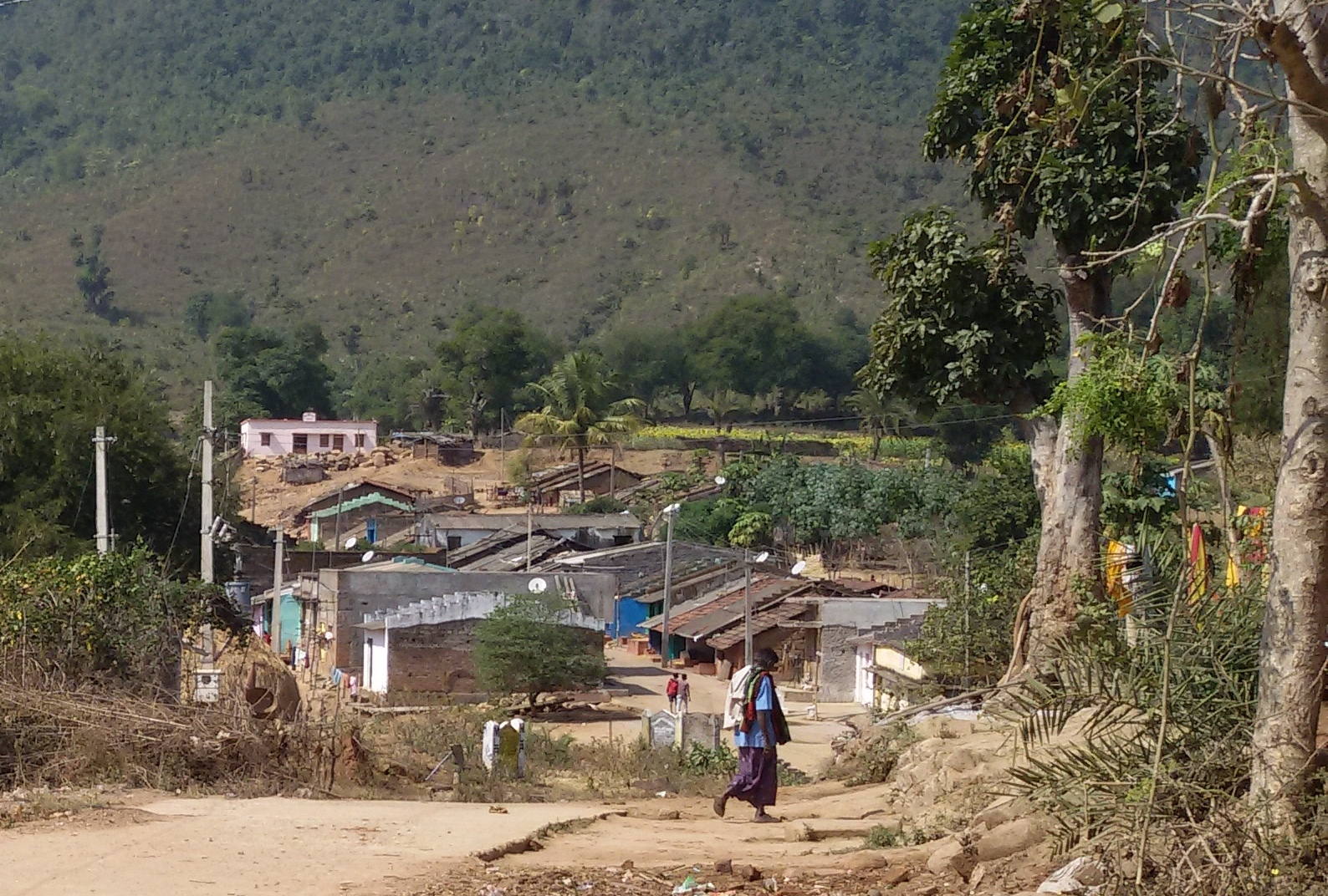
- Kiapadu village in Rayagada district

- Location in Odisha, India Kiyapadu (India)
- Coordinates: 19°35′00″N 83°22′00″E
- Country: India
- State: Odisha
- District: Rayagada

Government
  - Type: Democratic
- Elevation: 229 m (751 ft)

Languages
  - Official: Oriya
- Time zone: UTC+5:30 (IST)
- PIN: 765002
- Telephone code: 06855
- Vehicle registration: OD
- Website: odisha.gov.in

Kiyapadu is a hamlet in Rayagada Tahasil of Gumma Panchayat in the state of Odisha, India dominated by Dongaria Tribe. The village was in lime light when the local people opposed the establishment of the Alumina Refinery by RSB.

== Geography ==
Kiyapadu is situated about 329 km from the district headquarters i.e. Rayagada. Kiyapadu is situated at 19°35′N 83°22′E.

== Demography ==
Majority of the population at and nearby Kiyapadu are primitive tribal. As of 2011 census available in the "Official website of census india" the population of the village was 297, of which 144 were males and 153 were females as per Population Census 2011.

== Tourist attractions ==
The village is surrounded by hillocks. The nearest place of tourist interest is Chatikona.
