= BJD =

BJD may refer to:

- Ball-jointed doll
- Ballyjamesduff, a town in Ireland
- Bangladesh Nationalist Party, a political party of Bangladesh
- Barycentric Julian Date, a time correction in astronomy
- Biju Janata Dal, a political party in India
- Bojong Gede railway station, a railway station in Bogor Regency, Indonesia
- Bovine Johne's Disease or paratuberculosis
- Bratislava Jazz Days, a jazz festival in Slovakia
- Bridget Jones's Diary, a 1996 novel by Helen Fielding
  - Bridget Jones's Diary (film)
- British Journal of Dermatology
