= Hatamuniguda =

- village
- Location in Odisha, India
- Coordinates: 19.59°N 83.50°E
- Country: India
- State: Odisha
- District: Rayagada
- Elevation: 207 m (679 ft)

Languages
  - Official: Odiya, English
- Time zone: UTC+5:30 (IST)
- PIN: 765020
- Telephone code: 06863

Hatamuniguda is an underdeveloped village of Rayagada district, Odisha, India - 765020. The village is 43 km far from its district main city Rayagada. Hatamuniguda is 258 km far from its state main city Bhubaneswar.

== Schools ==
- Ramakrishna Mission School, a CBSE affiliated English Medium School for poor tribal boys of underdeveloped districts of south west Odisha.
- Hatamuniguda G.T.O.U.P. School
- S.R.C.S High school
- Santi sishu Mandir
- Muniguda Arts College
- Bissam Cuttack Science College is the nearest Science College.
