= Bratislava Jazz Days =

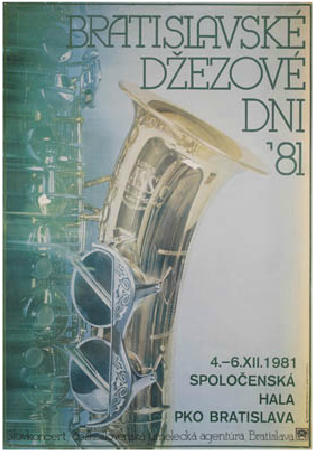
- Bratislava Jazz Days poster from 1981
- Genre: jazz
- Frequency: annually
- Location: Bratislava
- Inaugurated: 1975
- Most recent: 2014
- Patron: Peter Lipa
- Website: www.bjd.sk

Bratislava Jazz Days (BJD) is a festival of modern jazz, taking place in Bratislava (Slovakia), usually at Park kultúry a oddychu (Hall of the Culture and Leisure Park). In 2014, it was its 40th edition.

The festival was founded in 1975 by amateur jazz enthusiasts, most notably Peter Lipa, and later developed into a festival attended by world-class jazz players.

During the first years of existence, only the bands from Czechoslovakia and nearby socialist states (Eastern Bloc) attended the festival. It was in the year 1977, the 3rd edition of BJD, when the festival was attended by musicians from Western Europe - Retuperä band from Finland and Weiden trio from West Germany. In 1979, Bratislava Jazz Days welcomed their first American musician - the trumpeter Lee Harper.

In 1982, first internationally well-known jazz player attend the festival - guitarist and harmonica player Jean "Toots" Thielemans and in 1983 another jazz stars - guitarist Larry Coryell and drummer Jack De Johnette with his band Special Edition. The festival became an assorted exhibition of Czechoslovak and international jazz.

There have been 10 double-LP series of live recordings from the Bratislava Jazz Days festival 1976–1989, recorded by the Czechoslovak Radio Bratislava and released by Opus.
