= Niyamgiri =

Hill range situated in India

Coordinates: 19°35′N 83°24′E

Niyamgiri Hill Range
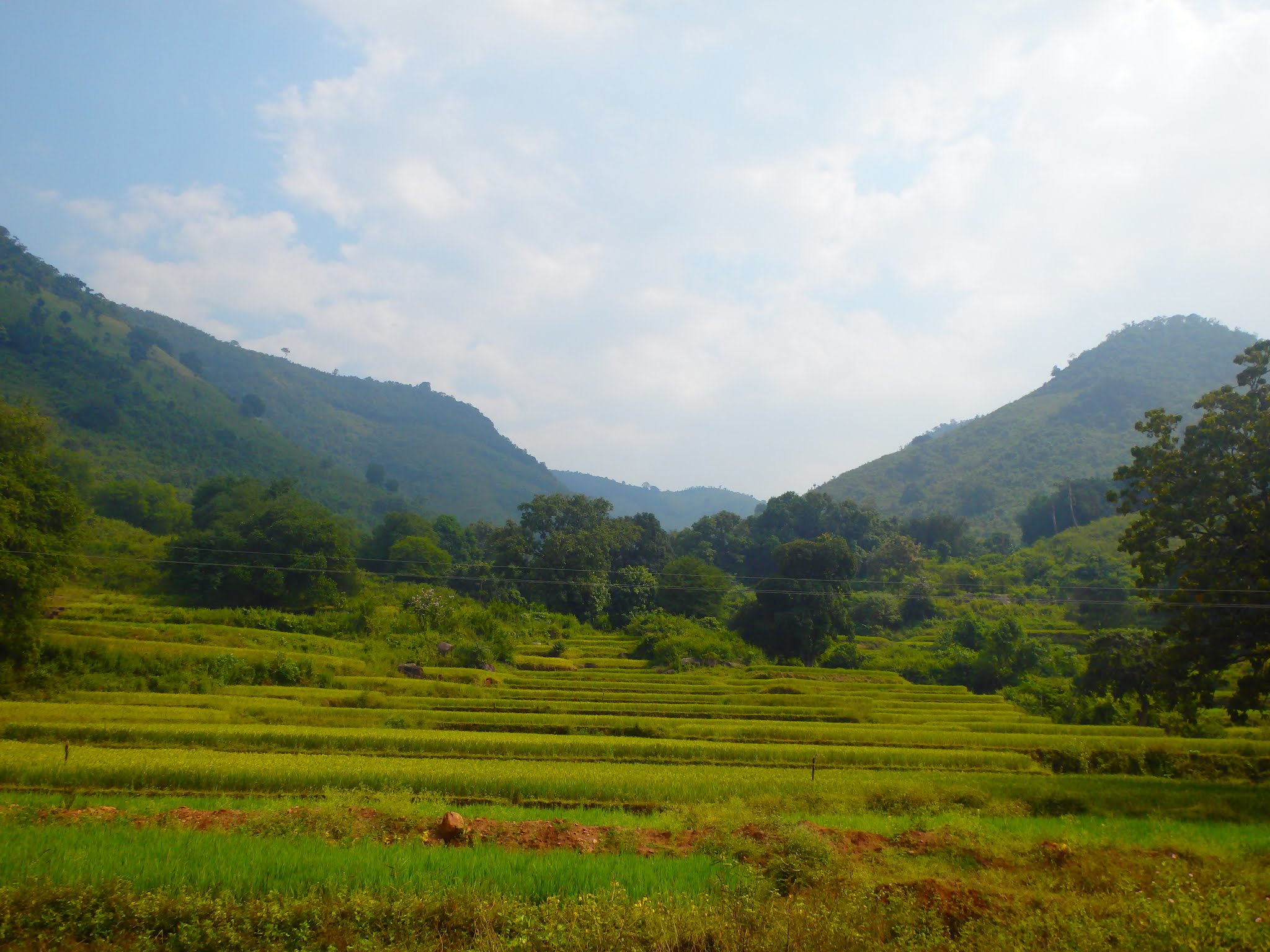
- A glimpse of Niyamgiri Hills

Highest point
- Peak: Central Hill
- Elevation: 1,515 m (4,970 ft)

Geography
- Country: India
- State: Odisha
- Districts: Kalahandi and Rayagada
- Borders on: Bissam Katak, Muniguda, Lanjigarh, Kalyansinghpur

The Niyamgiri is a hill range situated in the districts of Kalahandi and Rayagada in the south-west of Odisha, India. These hills are home to Dongria Kondh indigenous people. The hills have one of India's most pristine forests in the interior. It is bound by Karlapat Wildlife Sanctuary on the north-west side and Kotgarh Wildlife Sanctuary on the north-east end.

The Environment and Forest ministry of Government of India scrapped a forest clearance given to a mining firm, Vedanta Resources, to mine bauxite in the area and the mining project was scrapped. In 2013, the Supreme Court of India asked the tribal people to take the decision, in which BMP was rejected in all village council meetings.

== Timeline of Vedanta mining controversy ==
- 7 June 2003 - Vedanta Resources enters into Memorandum of understanding with Government of Odisha for setting up of 1 MTPA aluminium refinery and Coal-fired power station in Kalahandi district. The Bauxite for refinery was decided to be mined from Niyamgiri mountain.
- March 2004 - Vedanta Limited applies for the Ministry of Environment, Forest and Climate Change clearance.
- September 2004 - Vedanta gets MOEF clearance.
- 21 September 2005 - Central Empowered Committee headed by MK Jiwarajka IFS gives report before Supreme Court of India that the MOEF clearance violates Forest Conservation Act, 1980 and Environment Protection Act, 1986.
- 23 November 2007 - Supreme Court of India denies permission to mine Bauxite from Niyamgiri unless Vedanta Limited meets conditions.
- 8 August 2008 - Supreme Court of India gives Stage - II clearance for mining in Niyamgiri by over ruling CEC reports of 2005 and 2007.
- 2008 - 2009 - Protests by tribals in Bhubaneswar and Kalahandi against mining by Vedanta Resources.
- 2010 - Church of England, Government Pension Fund of Norway and various other prominent investors withdraw their funds from Vedanta.
- 16 August 2010 - A four member expert committee headed by N. C. Saxena submits a report that suggests that mining in Niyamgiri violates Forest Rights Act, 2006 and will jeopardize the existence of Particularly vulnerable tribal groups
- July 2011 - MOEF revokes its license for mining at Niyam Dongar.
- 18 April 2013 - Supreme Court of India orders for an Environmental Referendum among Particularly vulnerable tribal groups in Niyamgiri through Gram panchayat to decide on mining. This is a Landmark verdict called Odisha Mining Corporation vs Ministry of Environment, Forest and Climate Change case in which court upheld principles of Panchayats (Extension to Scheduled Areas) Act, 1996 and Free, prior and informed consent.
- July - August 2013 - More than 112 Palli Sabhas of 12 villages unanimously rejects mining by Vedanta Resources in Niyam Dongar sacred mountain.
- January 2014 - MOEF issues complete ban on mining at Niyamgiri however Aluminium refinery at Lanjigarh was allowed to operate.

== Forest Rights Act controversy ==
The issue of controversy over the VEDANTA mining lease on the upper reaches of the Niyamgiri hills in Orissa was examined by an official committee headed by Dr N C Saxena, formerly Secretary (Planning Commission). Here are some excerpts:

“ The VEDANTA site, the forested slopes of the Niyamgiri hills and the many streams that flow through them, provide the means of living for Dongaria Kondh and Kutia Kondh tribes, classified as ‘Primitive Tribal Groups’ that are eligible for special protection. The Niyamgiri massif is important for its rich biodiversity. It also plays the critical role of linking a whole series of forests and wildlife sanctuaries. The two Kondh communities regard the Niyamgiri hills as sacred and believe that their survival is dependent on the integrity of its ecosystem. The VEDANTA site is amongst the highest points in the hills and it is considered especially important as a sacred site. The proposed mining lease (VEDANTA) area is clearly the Community Forest Resource area as well as the habitat of the two Primitive Tribal Groups and their villages, as defined in the Forest Rights Act. Mining, if permitted, will directly affect almost 20 per cent of the world population of the Dongaria Kondh community. The mining operations will destroy significant tracts of forest lands. Since the Kondh are heavily dependent on forest produce for their livelihood, this forest cover loss will cause a significant decline in their economic well-being.Mining operations of the intensity proposed in this project spread over more than 7 square km would severely disturb this important wildlife habitat and inflict severe ecological damage. Several perennial springs flow from below the top plateau, which is a part of the proposed mining lease site. VEDANTA area is one of the main sources of Vamsadhara river which would make mining on this plateau a hydrological disaster. These Kondh villages have been vested with recognizable community and habitat rights by GoI under section 4(1) of the TFRA, and the procedure laid down in section 6 of the TFRA must be followed by the district authorities. These rights should have been formalized as soon as the Act came into being on 1 January 2008. As per the Preamble of the FR Act, forest dwellers are ‘integral to the very survival and sustainability of the forest ecosystem’. Therefore, in law, forests now include forest dwellers and are not limited to trees and wildlife. Since the MoEF is charged with the responsibility of implementing the Forest Conservation Act, it has to ensure that both forests and forest dwellers are protected. Section 5 of the TFRA has authorized the Gram Sabhas to ensure that their habitat is preserved from any form of destructive practices affecting their cultural and natural heritage. MoEF, as the authority under the Forest Conservation Act, cannot override the statutory authority under the Forest Rights Act, viz. the Gram Sabhas. From the meeting with the senior officers and the Chief Secretary, it was apparent that the district administration has been reluctant to act fairly and firmly under section 6 of the Act to formalize the rights of Kondh over the VEDANTA area, as the state government has already decided to transfer the said land for mining. Despite the reluctance of the district administration and state government, several Gram Sabhas have passed resolutions claiming community and habitat rights over the VEDANTA area and forwarded the same to the SDLC, as provided in section 6(1) of TFRA. From the evidence collected by the Committee, we conclude that the Orissa government is not likely to implement the FR Act in a fair and impartial manner as far as the VEDANTA area is concerned. It has gone to the extent of forwarding false certificates and may do so again in future. The VEDANTA Company has consistently violated the Forest Conservation Act, Forest Rights Act, Environmental Protection Act and the Orrisa Forest Act in active collusion with the state officials. Perhaps the most blatant example of it is their act of illegally enclosing and occupying at least 26.123 ha of Village Forest Lands within its refinery depriving tribal, dalits and other rural poor of their rights.”

== See also ==
- Plachimada Coca-Cola struggle
- The Jengaburu Curse
