= Durgi, Rayagada district =

Durgi
- Panchayat
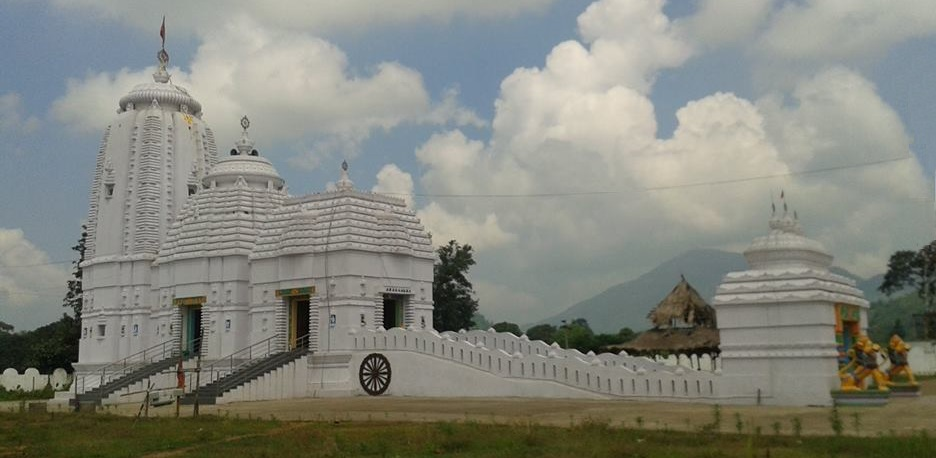
- Jagannath Temple of Durgi

- Location in Odisha, India Durgi (India)
- Coordinates: 19°20′47.06″N 83°36′0.9″E
- Country: India
- State: Odisha
- District: Rayagada
- Elevation: 421 m (1,381 ft)

Population (2011)
  - Total: 1,792

Languages
  - Official: Odia, English
- Time zone: UTC+5:30 (IST)
- Postal Pin Code: 765019
- Telephone Code: 06856
- Vehicle registration: OD 18
- Website: odisha.gov.in

Durgi is a census village & Panchayat headquarters of Bissam Cuttack Block in Rayagada district of Odisha, India. A total of 439 families are residing in this village.

== Geography ==
Durgi is located at 19.34°N 83.60°E. It has an average elevation of 421 m (1,381 ft).The village is surrounded by forests with mostly Sal (Dalbergia Latifolia), Teak (Tectona Grandis) and Mango trees. Forests and hills completely cover its outer region.

== Demographics ==
As of 2011 India census, the total population of the village is 1792, out of which the male population is 858 and the female population is 934. Durgi village has a higher literacy rate compared to Odisha's literacy rate. In 2011, the literacy rate of Durgi village was 75.51% compared to 72.87% of Odisha. In Durgi, Male literacy stands at 81.50% while female literacy rate was 70.18%. The population of children aged 0-6 is 232 which makes up 12.95% of total population of village. Average sex ratio of Durgi village is 1089 which is higher than Odisha state average of 979. The child sex ratio for Durgi as per census is 886, lower than Odisha average of 941. Durgi village has a substantial population of Schedule Caste (SC) constitutes 29.80% while Schedule Tribe (ST) were 15.79% of total population. The major language spoken in this region is Odia. Though Odia is predominantly spoken in Durgi, there is a diverse cultural mix with people speaking in Telugu and Hindi as well. The tribal populated villages around Durgi are using a tribal language called "Kandho".

== Transportation and communication ==
=== Road ===
- Durgi is connected to other parts of Odisha by state highway SH17 (Gunupur-Digapahandi-Berhampur) and SH04 (Paralakhemundi-Gunupur-Rayagada-Koraput). The nearest major town is Gunupur 40 km away and Rayagada which is 51 km away.
- Odisha State Road Transport Corporation, and Private buses run daily between Durgi to other parts of Odisha and Andhra Pradesh. The place is well connected to Bhubaneswar, Cuttack, Berhampur, Rayagada, Koraput, Jeypore, Bhawanipatna, Paralakhemundi, Palasa, Srikakulam, Vijayanagaram, and Visakhapatnam.

=== Railway ===
Durgi is well connected with the nearby railway stations like Gunupur (40;km away), Muniguda (35;km away) and Rayagada (51; km away). Gunupur, which is connected by the 90 km long 5 ft 6 in (1,676 mm) broad gauge railway line to Naupada railway junction on the Howrah-Chennai main line.

Rayagada railway station is an important station from where direct trains are available to Mumbai, Chennai, Kolkata, Hyderabad, Bhubaneswar, Raipur, New Delhi, Bangalore, Ahmedabad, Puri, Visakhapatnam, Vizianagaram and other cities. Rayagada Railway station comes in between Visakhapatnam-Raipur main line. Trains towards Raipur are passing through Muniguda railway station.

=== Air ===
The nearest airport is the Alluri Sitarama Raju International Airport at a distance of 240 km towards the south. The other nearest airports are the Bhubaneswar Airport, which is about 370 km, and Raipur Airport, which is around 340 km.

== Politics ==
As per constitution of India and Panchyati Raaj Act, Durgi village is administrated by Sarpanch (Head of Village) who is elected representative of village. Current MLA from Bissam Cuttack (ST) Assembly Constituency is Sri Jagannath Saraka of BJD, who won the seat in State elections of 2014 for the first time. Durgi comes under the Koraput (Lok Sabha constituency). Sri Saptagiri Urlaka of INS is the present elected MP of the Koraput (ST) Lok Sabha constituency. After independence, Durgi has been playing a prominent role in politics in Rayagada District in general and Bissam Cuttack constituency in particular. Many leaders are emerged from the land of Durgi and contributed significantly in politics. The popular personalities like Sri Trinath Das (Block Chairman, Bissam Cuttack) and Sri Sudhir Das (President of BJD, Rayagada District) do belongs from this place. Chief Ministers like late Biju Patnaik, Navin Patnaik and Giridhar Gomango also visited to this place for their socio-political work.

== Villages ==
The wards/ villages coming under Durgi Panchayat are:- Durgi, Bhaleri, Kundanpadar, Rengabai, Barangpadar, Thambalpadhu, Budhanagar, Kachapai, Kalipadar, Kurankul, Tentili Kalipadar, Mulipada, Dharamguda, Balipadar, Haduguda, Huruguda, Khariguda and IAY Colony.

== Gallery ==
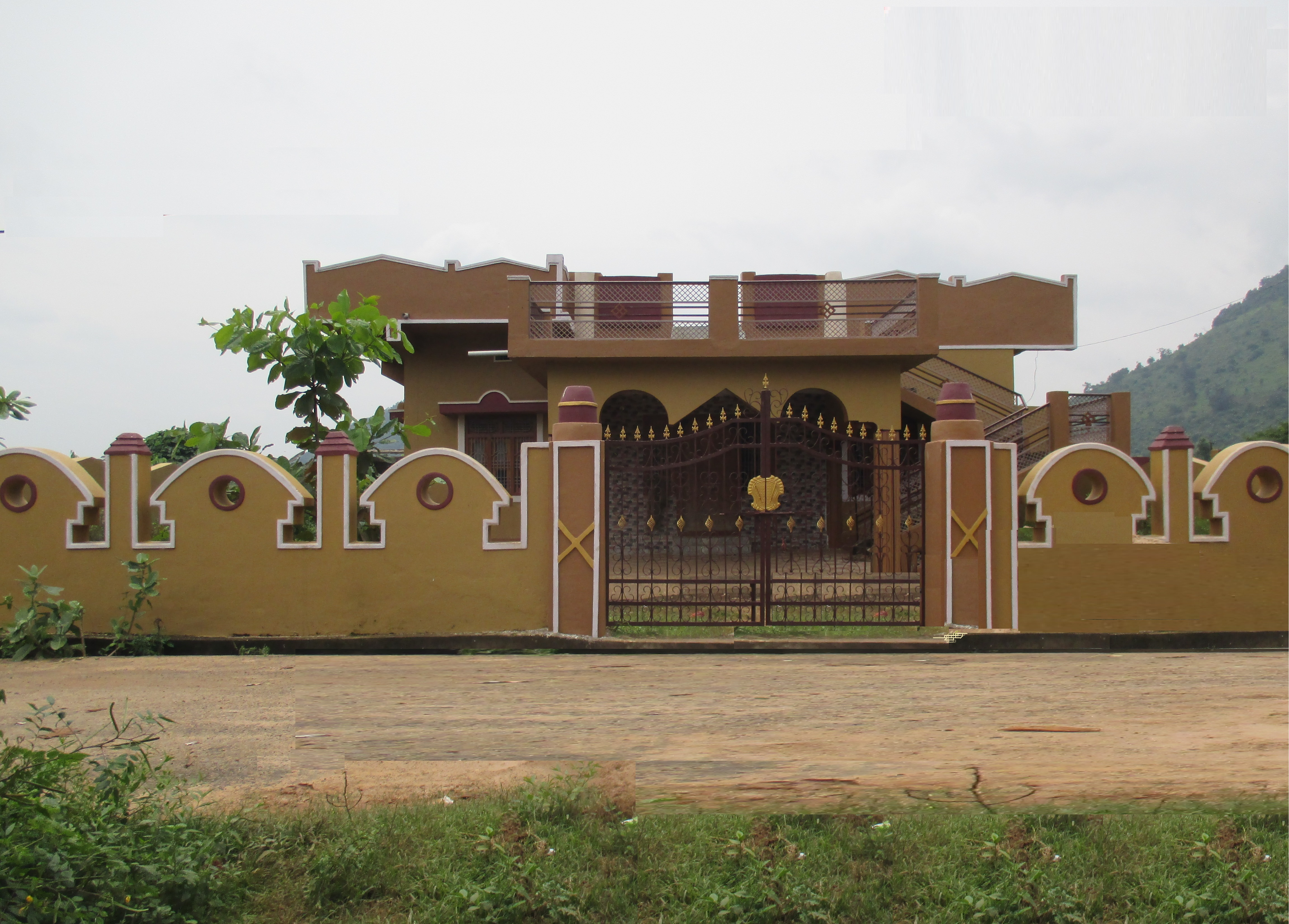
Kalyan Mandap, Durgi

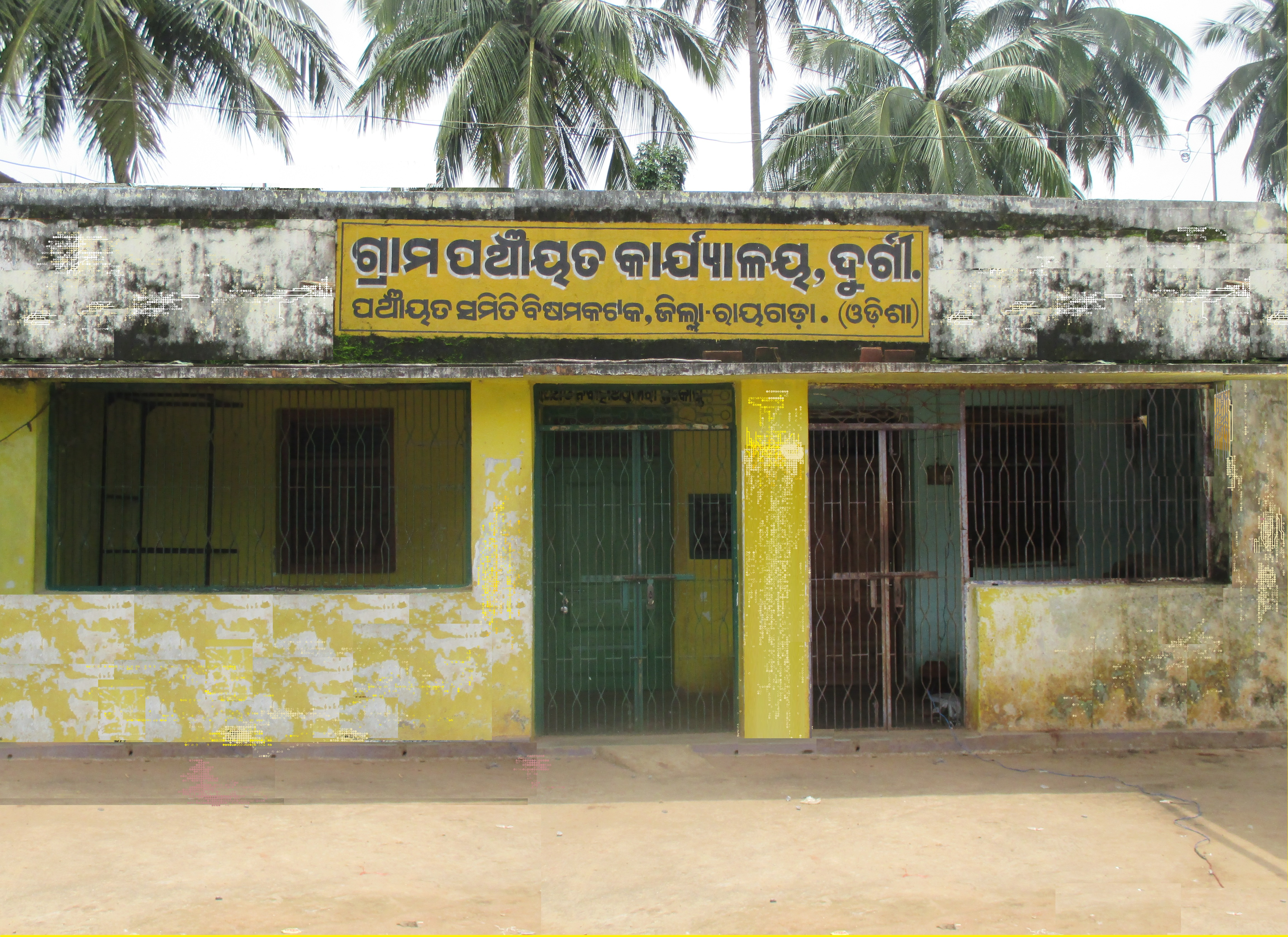
Panchayat Office, Durgi

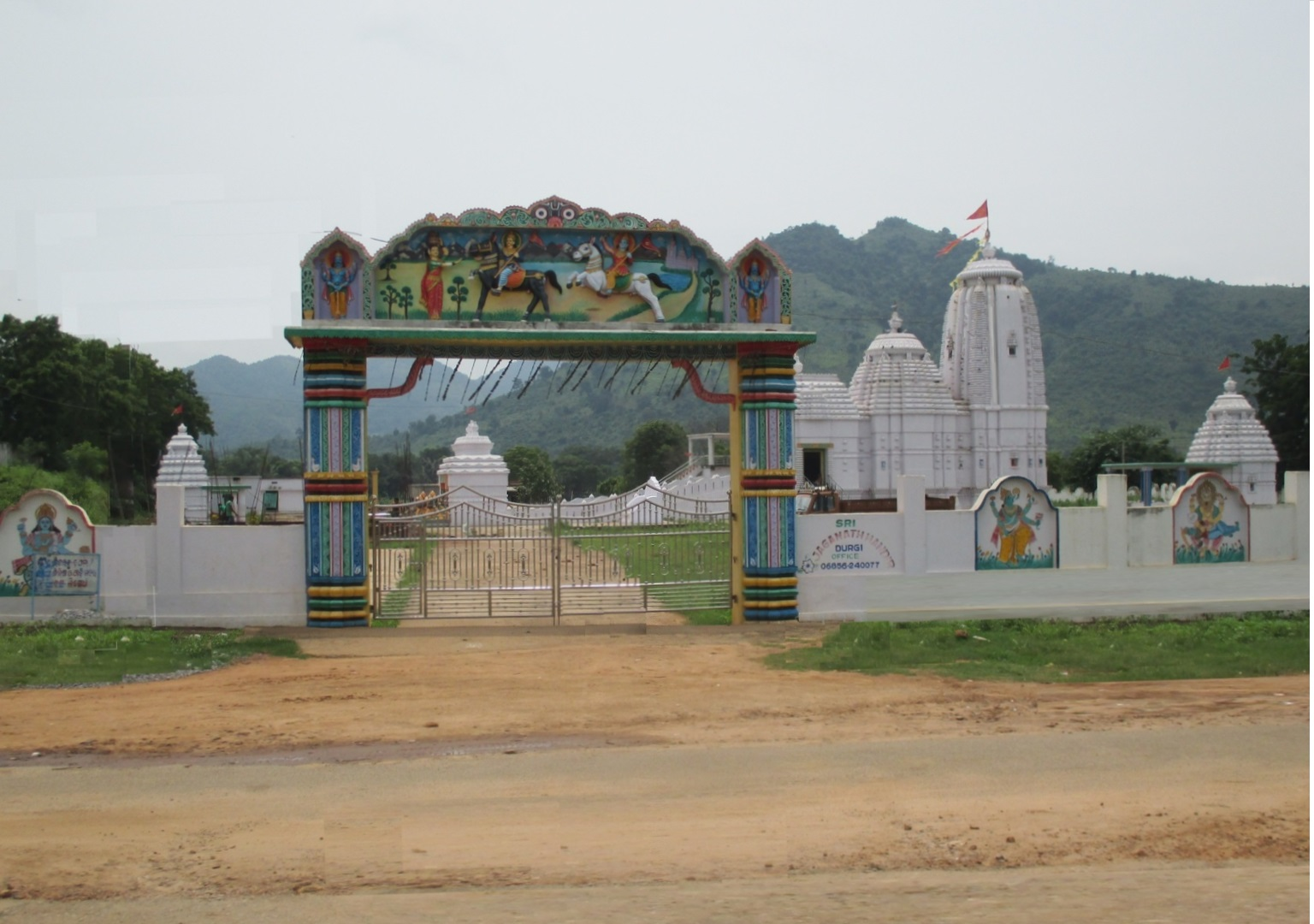
Sri Jagannath Temple

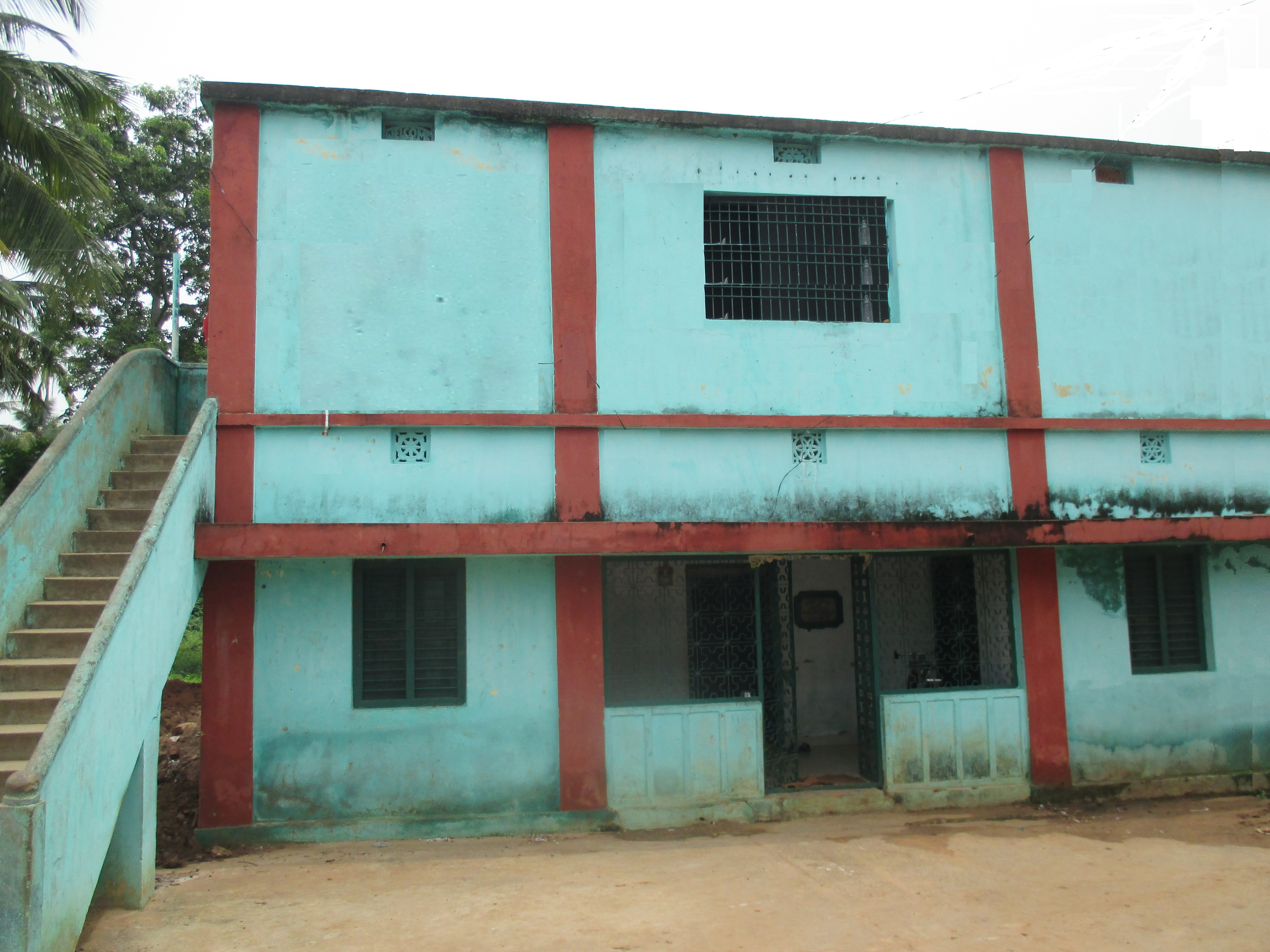
Bijayananda Youth Club

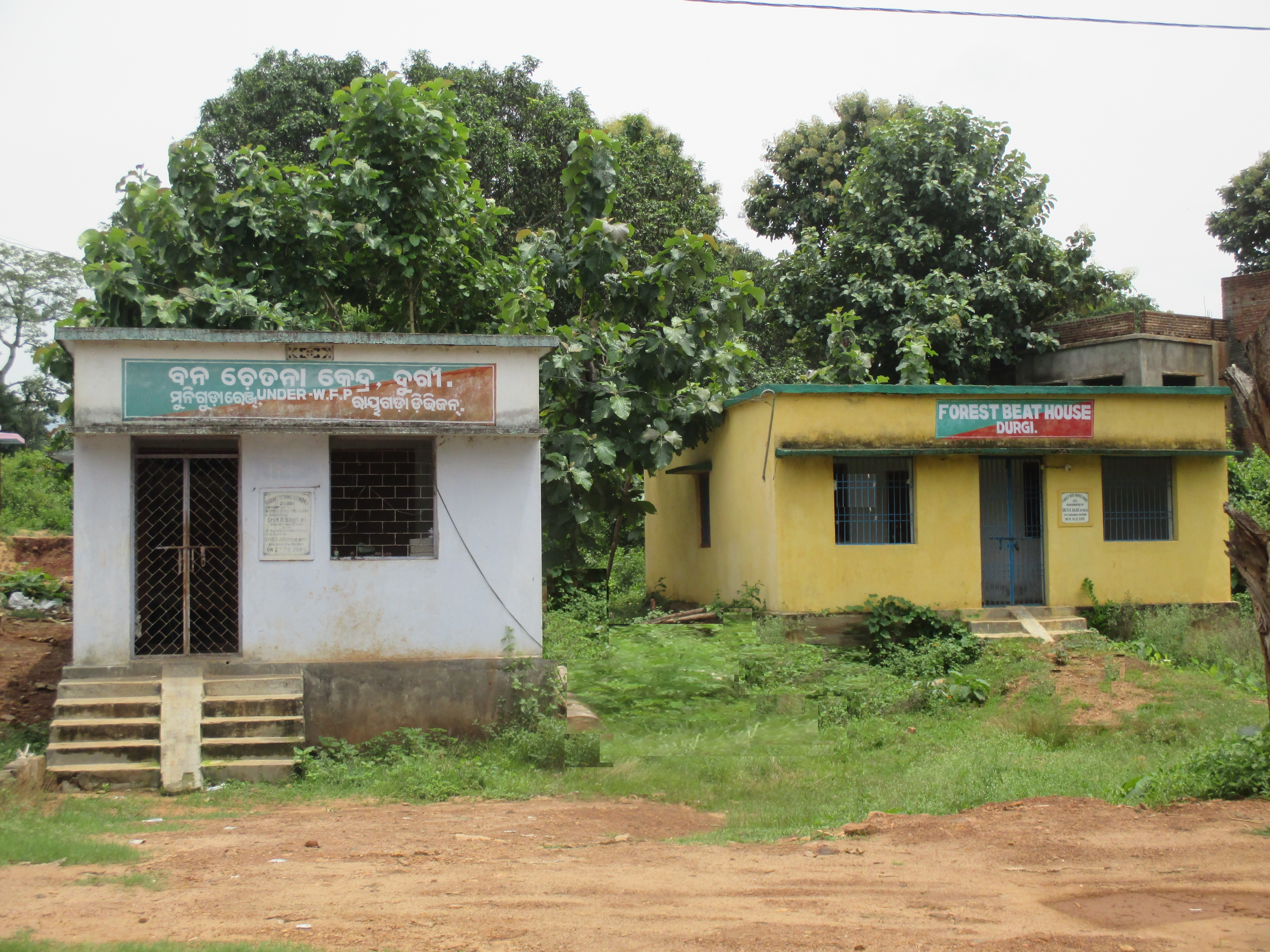
Forest Office

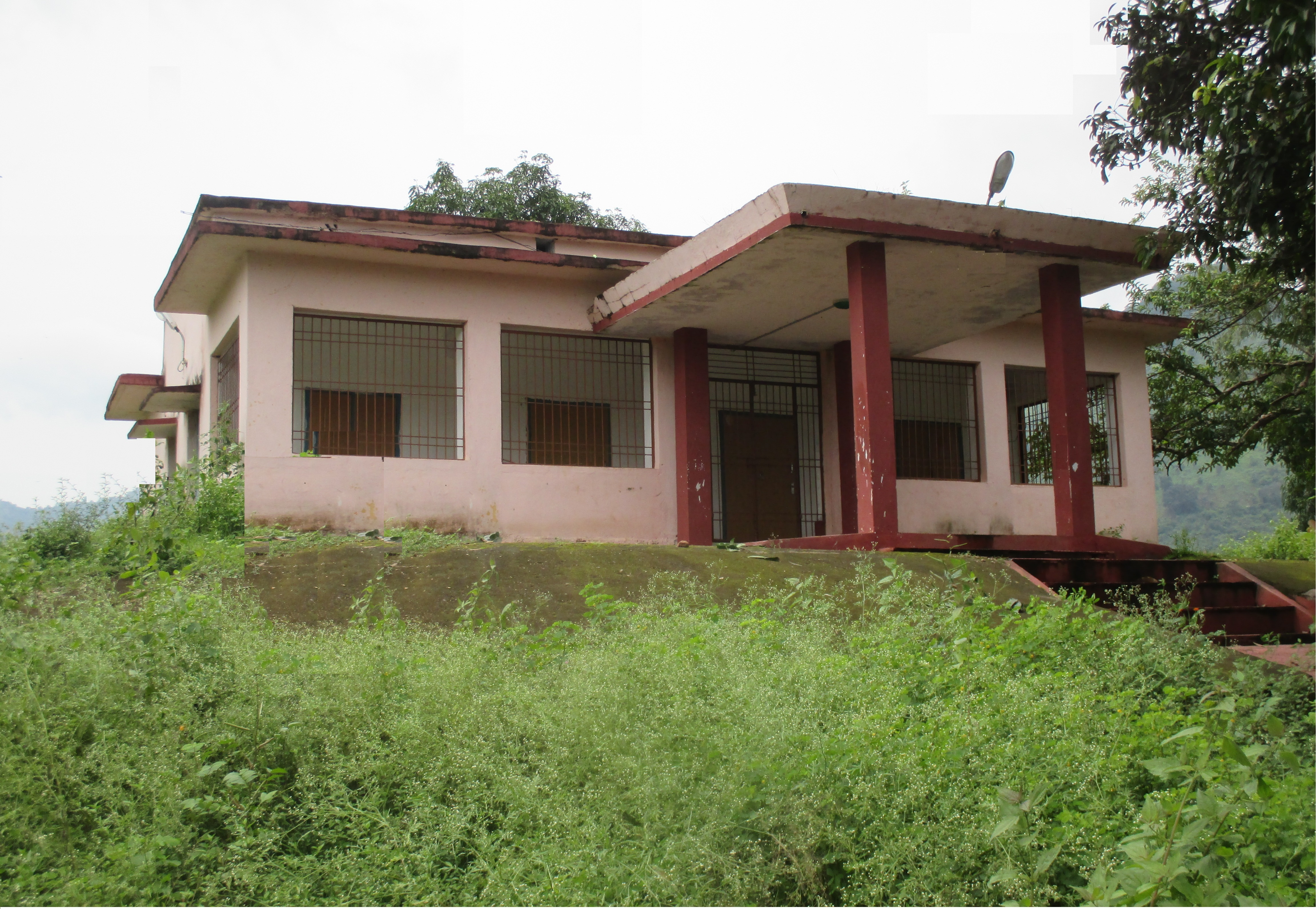
PWD Bungalow, Durgi

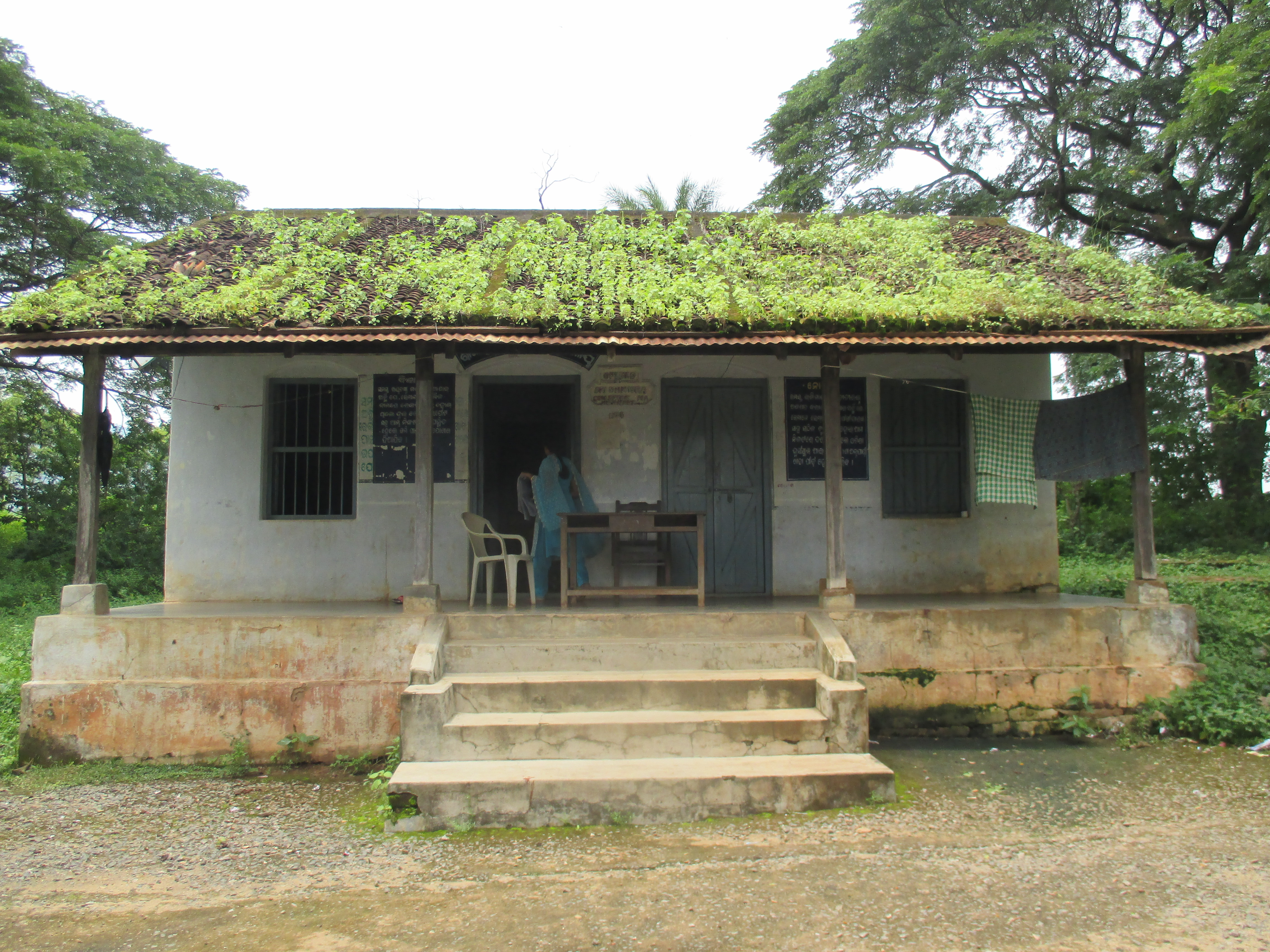
R.A.I Office, Durgi

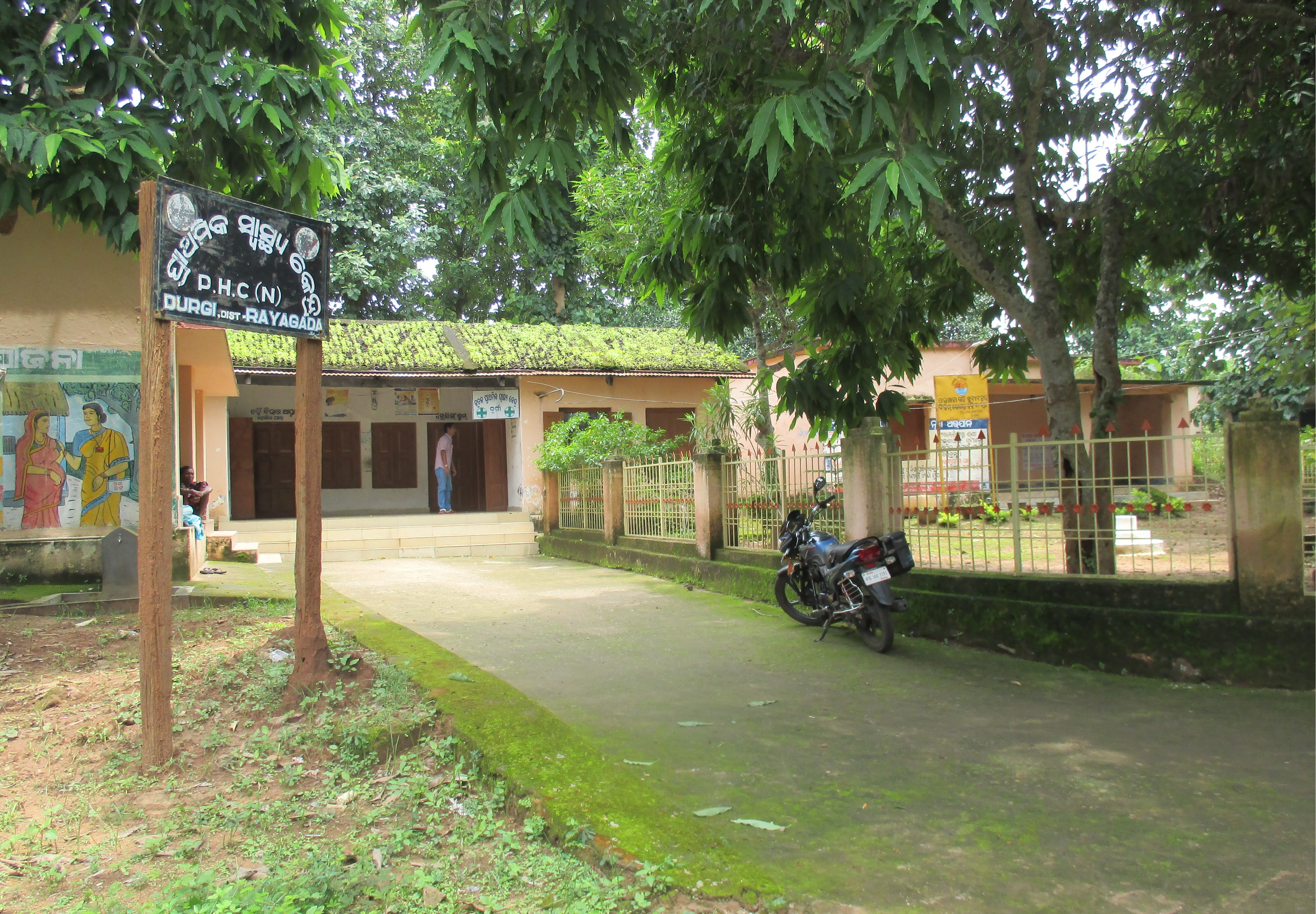
Primary Health Centre, Durgi

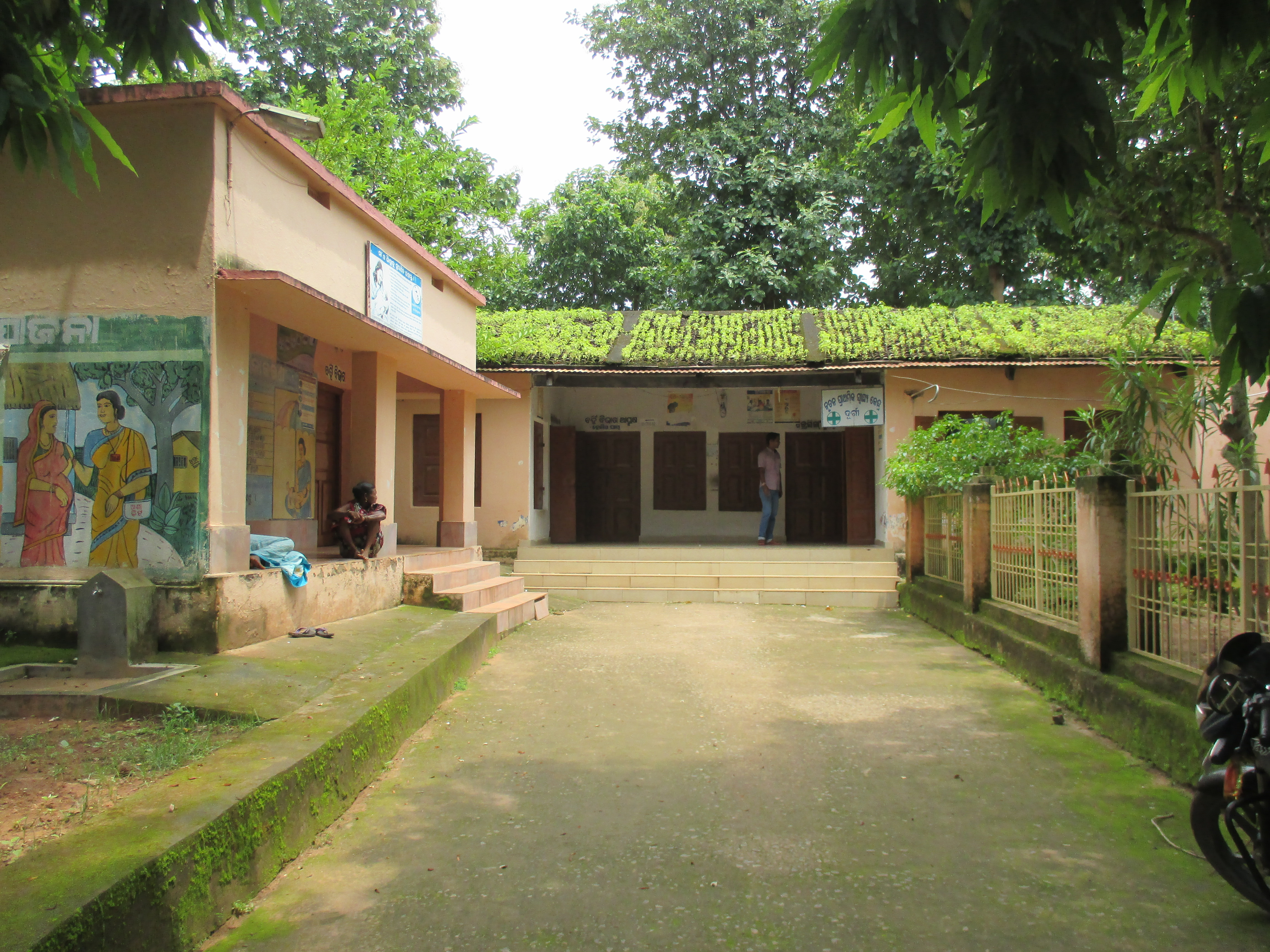
Durgi Hospital

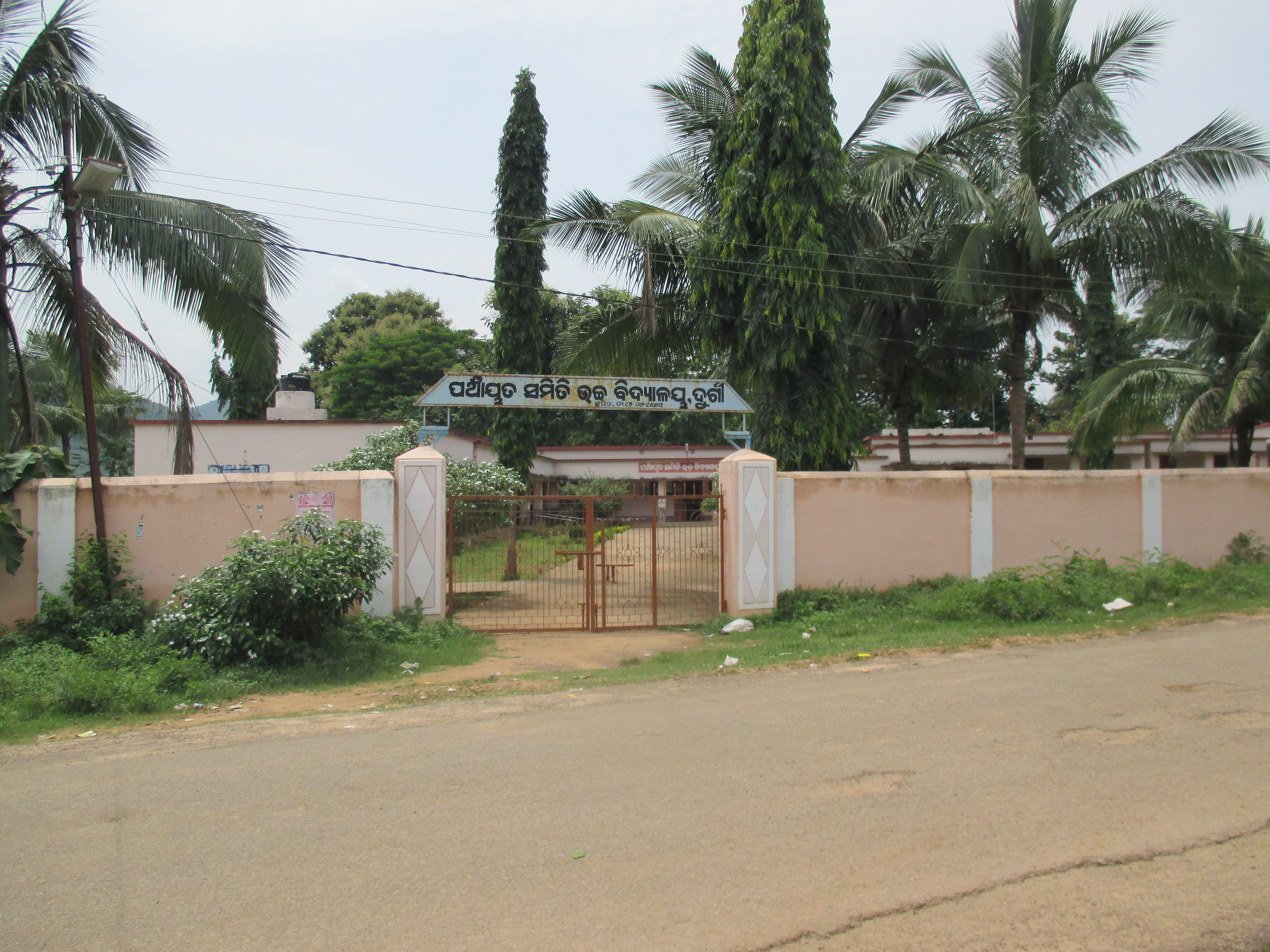
PS High School, Durgi

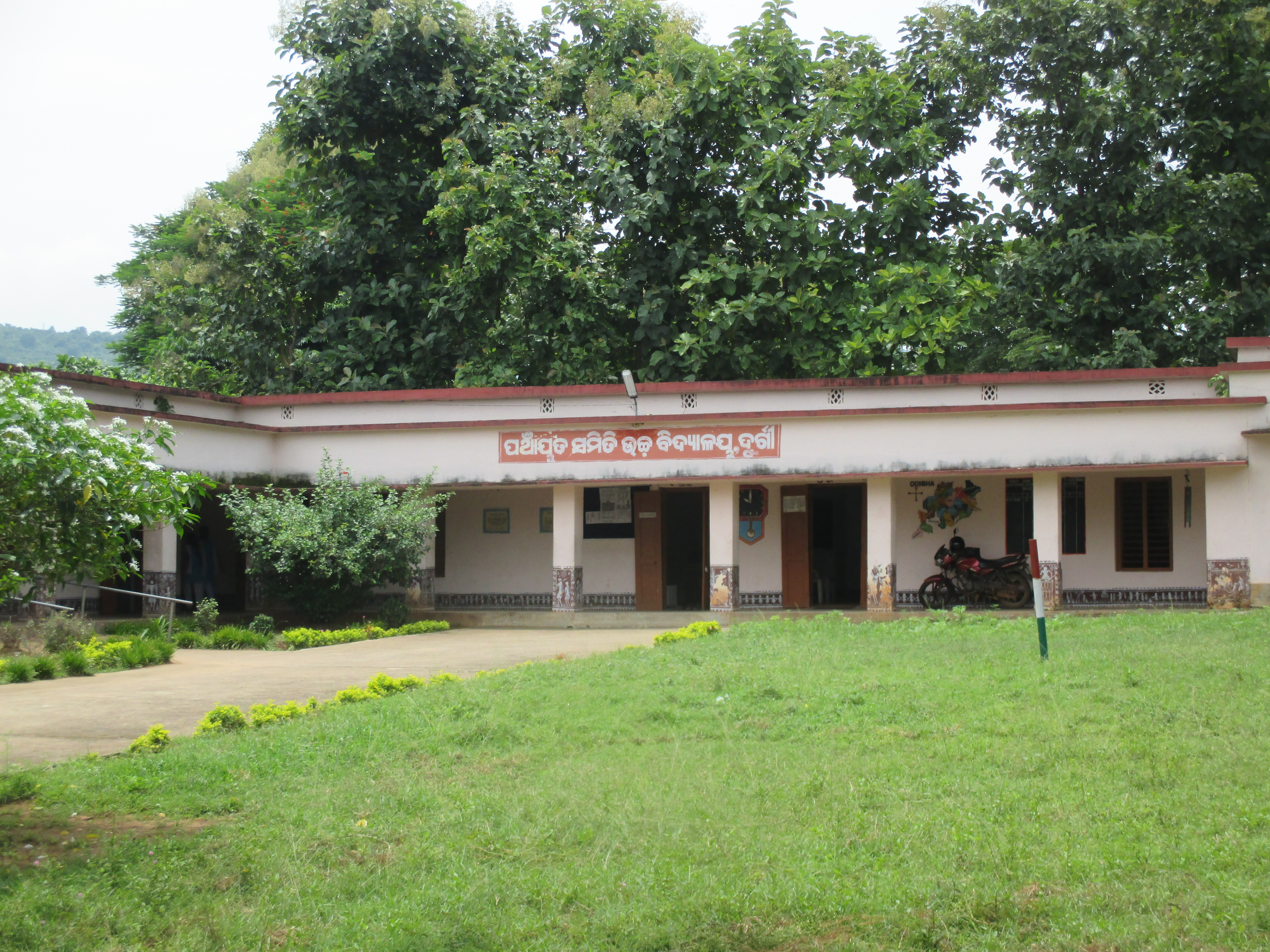
PS High School, Durgi

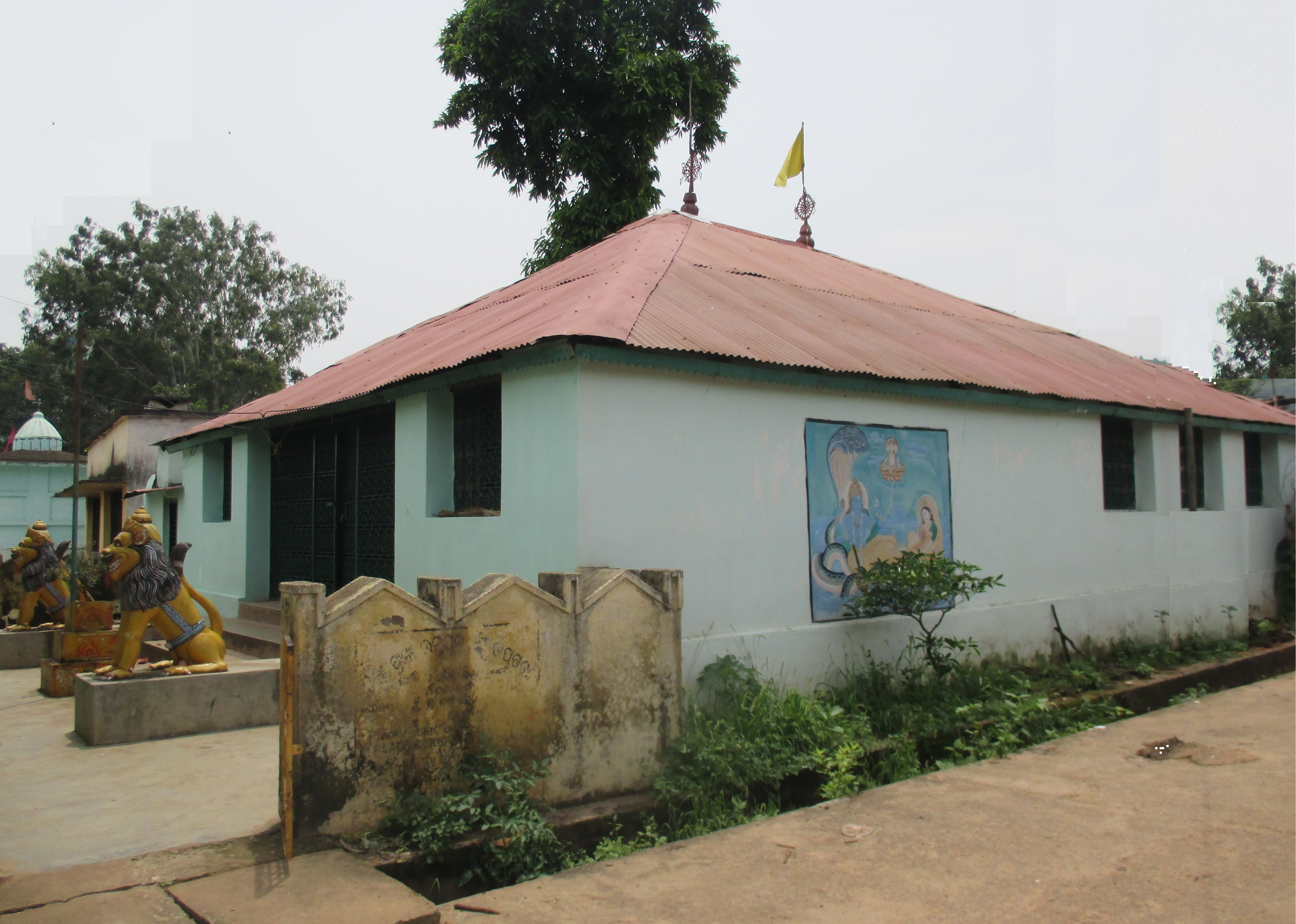
Radhakanta Matho, Durgi

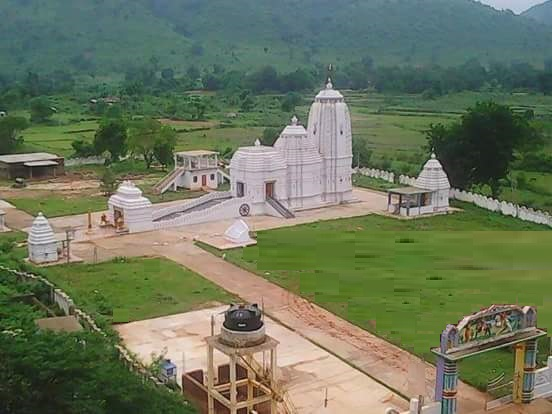
Bird eye view of Durgi Jagannath Temple

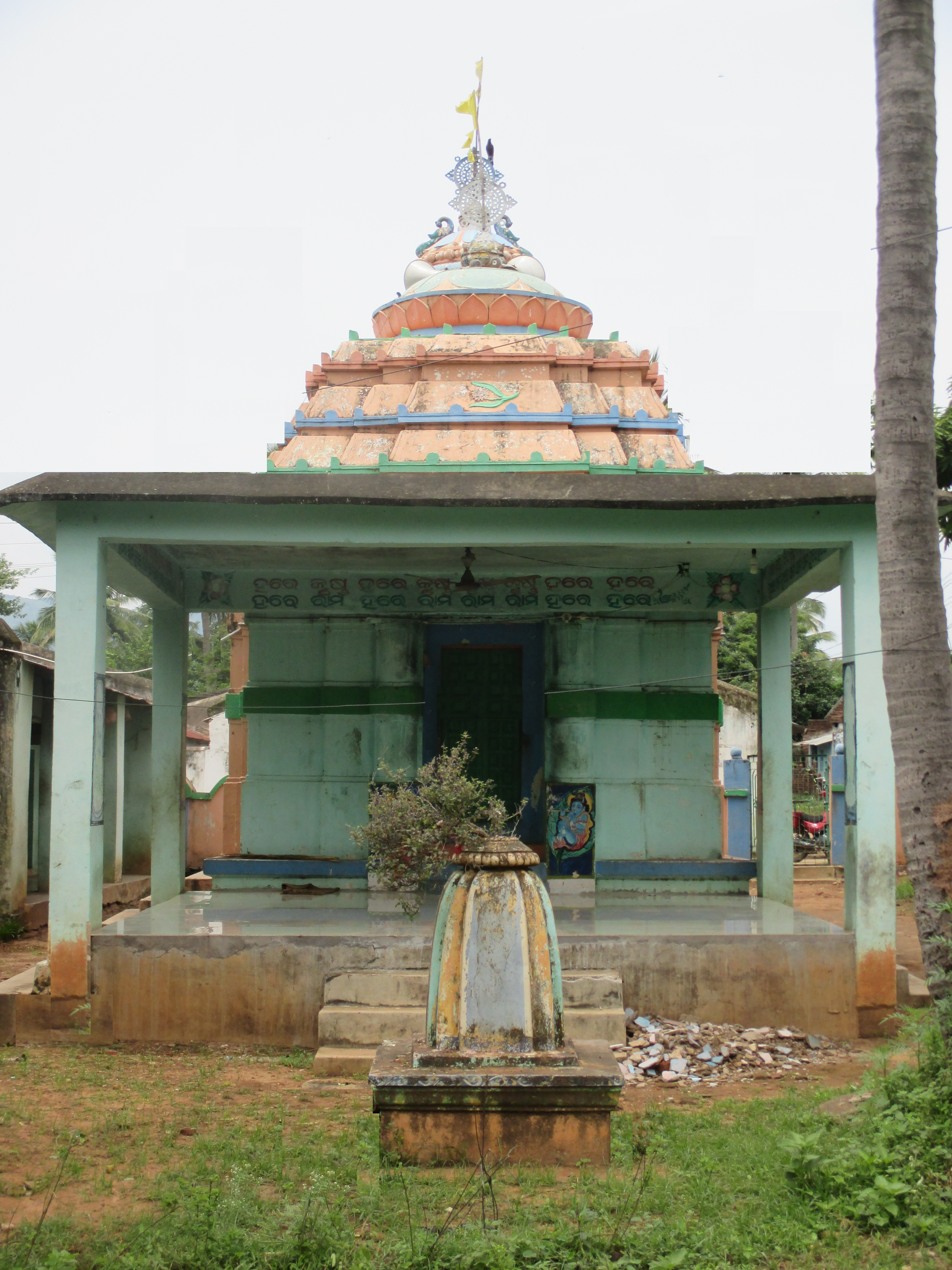
Radha Krishna Temple

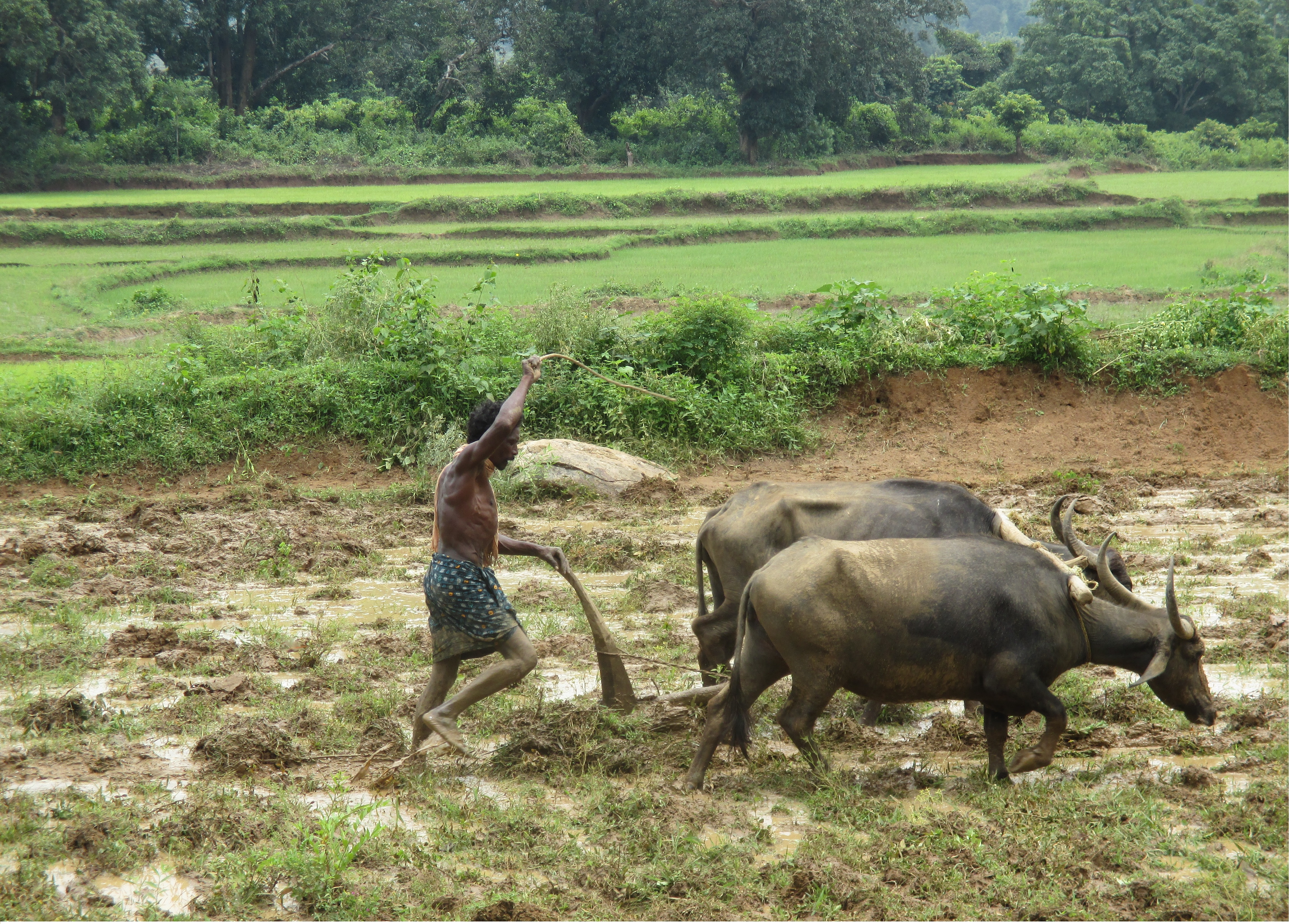
Durgi village view1 in rain season

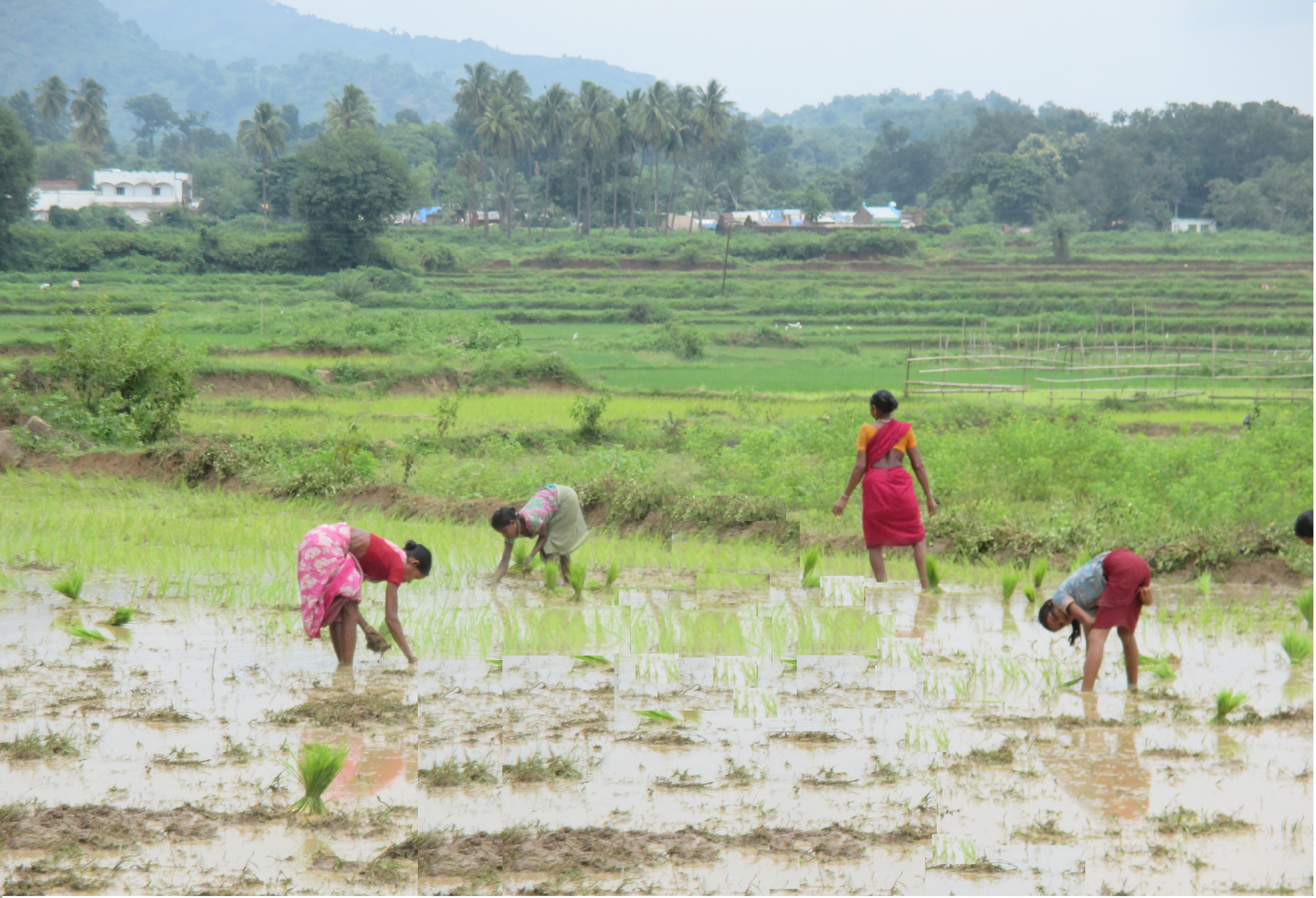
Durgi village view2 in rain season
