= Parikud =

- Rural Island
- Location in Odisha, India
- Coordinates: 19.593313°N 85.318950°E
- Country: India
- State: Odisha
- District: Puri

Government
  - MLA: Upasna Mohapatra (BJP)
  - BDO: Bhaskar Raito, BDO, Krushnaprasad
- Elevation: 1 m (3.3 ft)

Population (2011)
  - Total: 89,371

Languages
  - Official: Odia
- Time zone: UTC+5:30 (IST)
- PIN: 752032
- Website: www.odisha.gov.in

Parikud is an island in Chilika Lake, Odisha, India. The land mass is spread over 97 mouzas (administrative districts) of Krushnaprasad panchayat samiti. It is surrounded by Chilika Lake and the Bay of Bengal on two sides. The settlement Janhikuda is located at the easternmost end of the island and acts as an access point to Puri. The residents of this area primarily work in agriculture and fishing. The current head of the island is Raja Santosh Chandra Deo.

== Geography ==
Parikud is surrounded by the Bay of Bengal to the southeast and Chilika Lake to the northwest.

== History ==
Before 1774, Parikud was controlled by the king (Raja) of Bankad (now Banpur). Because Bankara came under attack from the East India Company, Raja of Bankad Sri Harisevak Mansingh went to Parikud and established his capital Nrusinghgarh at Gurubai.

Raja Bhagirathi Mansingh shifted his capital to Krishnaprasad and erected a royal palace in 1798. British forces could not attack Parikud because the region was covered with Chilika Lake. The king donated a village for Brahmins (sasan), which is known as Bhagirathipur Sasan.

When the British invaded Odisha from the south in 1803, the traitor Fateh Muhammed, a ferry owner from Kandakhai (Malud), met them on the shores of Chilika Lake. He showed them the eastern route, by which they reached Puri undetected. In return, Fateh Muhammed was given freehold of Malud and Parikud, most of which is today called Garh Krishnaprasad.

Parikud is located in Krushnaprasad Garh in the Puri district, Odisha. It was founded by Raja Bhagirathi Mansingh, who was the nephew of Maharaja Harisevak. Banpur was previously known as Bankada garh, which was than ruled by the dynasty of the present kings of Parikud, who were attacked by British with the help of Namak Haraam Jagirdar, who helped the British attack the Banpur fort to kill the king and destroy the Banpur fort palace for helping the anti-British Paiko mutiny. The British captured and destroyed the fort of Banpur and killed most of the male members for the royal family of Banpur (now Parikud family) for helping the first Paiko mutiny with horses, equipment and valuables. Most of the members of the family escaped from Banpur with their children but the king was captured and killed. They walked into Gurubai, which was next to Puri, and built their state in Parikud and shifted to protect it from British. The British again tried to enter Parikud through Satpara but were drowned. The government has recovered swords and guns of the British era from the lake.

In 1798, the 16th King Maharaj Bhagirat Manasingh built a comfortable, modern palace with Italian tiles, Belgian glasses and English marble known as Krushnaprasad palace. King George of Greece became the Honourable Guest of the king of Parikud, which upset the British. Rule of the royal family started without interference over the territory for a long period. The royal state of Parikud extended from Kuhuri to Banpur, Gurubai and Krushna Prasad. The palace is still intact. The Kalijai island is still owned by the royal family of Parikud.

== Demographics ==
As of 2011 Indian census, Krishnapra block had a population of 89,371. Males constitute 51% of the population and females 49%. Parikud has an average literacy rate of 72.24%—compared with the national average of 74.04%—with 78% of males and 65% of females literate.

97 mouzas (revenue villages) of Parikud regions are given below.

- Alanda
- Deulapada
- Sanaanla
- Nalitakudi
- Siandi
- Barunakuda
- Harichandanpur
- Gobardhuli
- Talangiri
- Udayagiri
- Jamuna
- Badaanla
- Ipinga
- Naba
- Gopalpur
- Berhumpur
- Balijagannathpur
- Sipia
- Kumarpur
- Talatala
- Tichhini
- Khalamuhan
- Maladeikuda
- Fatepur
- Ora
- Maensa
- Kamalasingh
- Mardarajpur
- Samantarapur
- Rasidgaon
- Chitrakote
- Uthanikuda
- Kalijaipahad
- Adalabad
- Anua
- Parala
- Baripadar
- Kurupal
- Ramalenka(Sanasahi, badasahi)
- Kandeswar
- Alanda Patana
- Badadanda
- Nalabana
- Siala
- Nolipatana
- Bhabanipur
- Badajhad
- Patanasi
- Nandala
- Pitisal
- Titipa
- Rasakudi
- Budhibar
- Kanheipur
- Nuapada
- Khirisahi
- Jenapur
- Paikerapur
- Balipatapur
- Baliapokhari
- Nuagaon
- Jagirikuda
- Sahabajpur
- Kumpuri
- Anlakuda
- Mithakuan
- Goursi
- Kadakani
- Hunjan
- Chadheya
- Kandaragaon
- Kholaganja
- Morada
- Gurubai
- Gomundia
- Jharakata
- Malakuda
- Brahmandeo
- Fulabari
- Khatiakudi
- Patharaganja
- Nuagaon
- Janhikuda
- Tubuka
- Patharakata
- Arakhakuda
- Patanasi
- Kalada
- Krushnaprasad(Samanta Sahi, Paika Sahi, Dalabehera Sahi)
- Maludakhas
- Gilinasi
- Khatisahi
- Santarapur
- Golapur
- Badakuda
- Bajrakote
- Patapur

== Climate ==
The region is situated in the coastal area with a temperate climate. Rainfall is suitable for agriculture.

== Art and culture ==
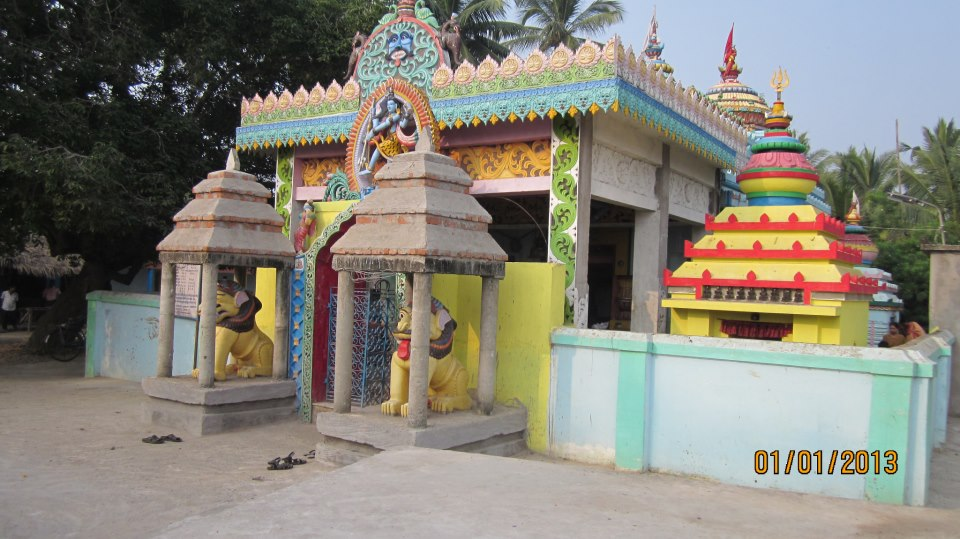
Jagateswar Temple, Naba

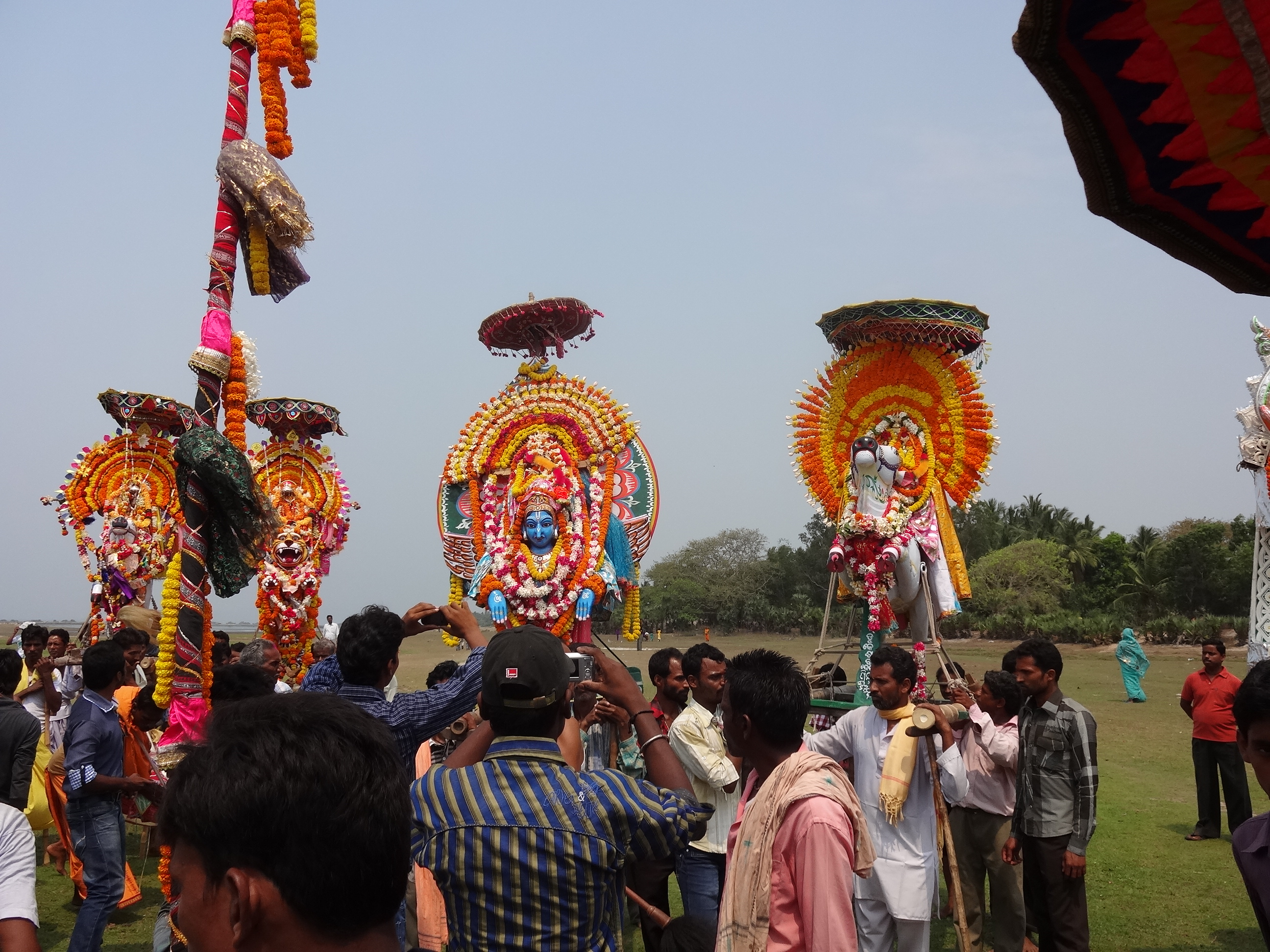
Panchudola Yatra

Famous festivals celebrated in Parikud are:

- Pana Yatra
- Panchudola Yatra
- Dasadola Yatra
- Chandan Yatra
- Raja Parba
- Kartika Purnima
- Dola Purnima
- Makar Sankranti
- Maha Shivaratri
- Durga Puja
- Dussehra
- Diwali

Famous temples in Parikud are:

- Baba Jagateswar Temple - Naba
- Sri Raghunath temple - Anua
- Maa Badajena temple - Anua
- Pandeswar Dev – Titipa
- Kamaleswar Dev – Daulapada
- Sarveswar Dev – Mahisa
- Jhadeswar Dev – Badajharo
- Balingaswar Dev – Golopuru
- Bateswar Dev – Gomundia
- Gopinath Dev – Balisasano
- Guteswar Dev- Nuapada
- Dadhibaban Dev-Gurubai
- Radhakanta Dev- Janhikuda
- Nilakantheswar Dev – Krushnaprasad
- Dadhibaban Dev – Krushnaprasad
- Shree Jagananth Temple – Krushnaprasad
- Baba Gadiswar Dev – Krushnaprasad Garh
- Maa Badadion Devi – Jagirikuda
- Nilakantheswar Dev – Olanda
- Bateswar Dev – Moroda
- Baba Kanakeswar Dev-Siala
- Jagateswar Deva – Siandi
- Maa Kanak Durga Devi –Krushnaprasad
- Maa Charchika Devi – Nuapada
- Baba Akhandaleswar Dev- Patapur/Gopalpur/Ratamati
- Maa Chandidevi-Patapur
- maa barani devi -jenapura
- Raghunath Dev - Talatala
- Radhakrishna Dev - Talatala
- Shree Shyam sundar Dev- Ramalenka
- Shree Shanishchar Dev- Ramalenka
- Baba Dakshineswar - Brahmandeo
- Maa Kalapata- Ramalenka
- Gopinath Dev - Nandala
- Jagannath Temple - Krushnaprasad
- Shree Trilochaneswar Dev Temple - Tichhini
- Maa Malikasuni Devi - Tichhini

== Education ==
Colleges in Parikud:

- Kandakhai College of Science and Arts, Bajrokote
- Rukmunidevi Chilika Mahavidyalaya, Chilika Nuapada
- Women's College, Titipa
- Govt. ITI College, Gopalpur
- Sanasima High School, Ora
- Trilochaneswar Bidyapitha, Tichhini
- Gyanadeep Higher Secondary School, Badajhad, Krushnaprasad

== Health centres ==
There is a primary health center at Chilika Nuapada. There is another health unit near Andhra Bank, Krushnaprasad Garh Branch.

== Politics ==
Parikud comes under Brahmagiri (Sl. No.: 108), a Vidhan Sabha constituency of Puri district, Odisha. In the 2024 election, Bharatiya Janata Party candidate Upasna Mohapatra defeated Biju Janata Dal candidate Umakanta Samantaray.

== Notable residents ==
- Mayadhar Mansingh - Odia poet and writer
- Lalit Mansingh - former Indian diplomat, the Foreign Secretary of India
- Sanjay Kumar Das Burma - former MLA, Brahmagiri
- Lalitendu Bidyadhar Mohapatra - former MLA, Brahmagiri
- Lalatendu Bidyadhar Mohapatra - former MLA, Brahmagiri
- Upasna Mohapatra - MLA, Brahmagiri

== See also ==
- Chilika lake
- Balugaon
- Banapur
