= Shailodbhava dynasty =

6th-8th century Indian dynasty

- c. 6th century CE–c. 8th century CE
- The Shailodbhavas and neighbouring South Asian polities circa 600 CE.
- Capital: Banapur
- Religion: Hinduism
- Government: Monarchy
- Historical era: Classical India
  - Established: c. 6th century CE
  - Disestablished: c. 8th century CE
Preceded by	Succeeded by
Gupta Empire; Gauda Kingdom	Bhauma-Kara dynasty

The Shailodbhava (IAST: Śailodbhava) dynasty ruled parts of eastern India during the 6th-8th centuries. Their core territory was known as Kongoda-mandala, and included parts of the present-day Ganjam, Khordha and Puri districts in the Odisha state. Their capital was located at Kongoda, which is identified with modern Banapur.

The early rulers of the dynasty were feudatories to the Guptas, Vigrahas, the Mudgalas, and Shashanka. The Shailodbhava ruler Madhavaraja II seems to have assumed sovereignty soon after 620 CE. The dynasty declined in the 8th century, and their territory came under the Bhauma-Kara rule.

== Origin ==
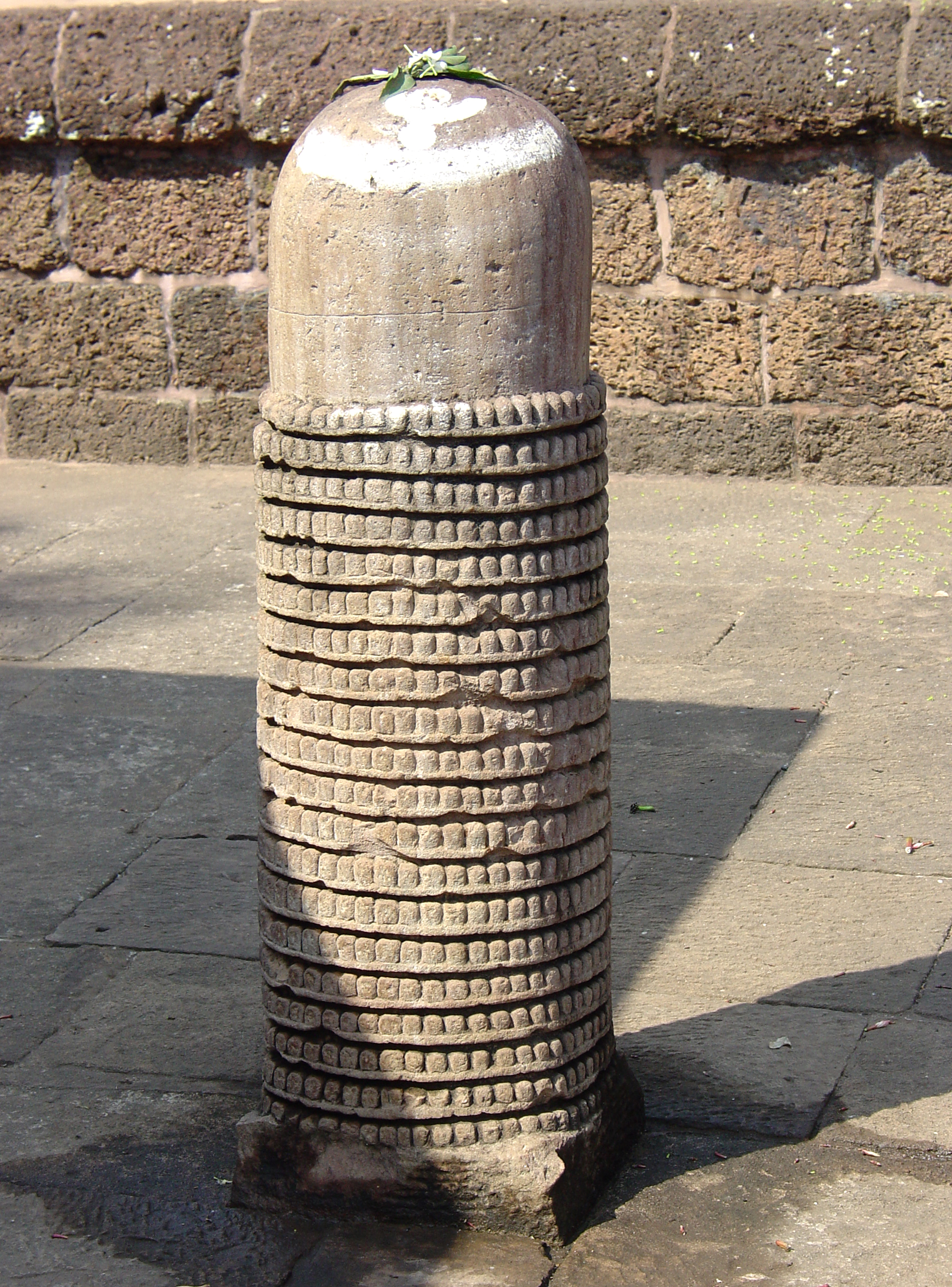
Sahasralinga, a shiva linga at the Parashurameshvara Temple, carved with 1000 miniature representations of itself.

The word "Shailodbhava" literally means "born out of rocks". The Shailodbhava inscriptions narrate the following myth of the dynasty's origin: Pulindasena, a famous man of Kalinga, prayed the god Svayambhu to create a man capable of ruling the earth. The dynasty's founder Shailodbhava emerged from a rock as a result of this prayer. The god is identified as Hara (Shiva) in one inscription.

Associating Pulindasena with the ancient Pulinda tribe, historians such as Upinder Singh believe that this myth reflects the tribal origins of the dynasty. The motif of emerging from a rock may suggest that the dynasty was initially based in a region featuring rocky terrain: the Shailodbhava inscriptions name the Mahendra mountain as the dynasty's kula-giri (tutelary mountain). The mention of Shiva shows that the rulers were Shaivites. Patit Paban Mishra also suggests that the Shailodbhavas were of tribal descent.

== History ==
Much of the information about the dynasty comes from its sixteen copper-plate inscriptions. This information is corroborated by other sources, such as monuments and accounts of foreign travelers.

=== As feudatories ===
Find spots of the Shailodbhava inscriptions

The Shailodbhavas ruled a region centred around present-day Ganjam; this region came to be known as Kongoda-mandala during their reign. Earlier, around 570-71 CE (250 Gupta era), this region was controlled by Dharmaraja of Abhaya family, who ruled as a feudatory of Vigraha, who themselves were viceroy of Guptas. It was later ruled by the semi-independent king Charamparaja. The introductory part of a 620-21 CE inscription of the Shailodbhava ruler Madhavaraja II is similar to that of the 570-71 Sumandala inscription of Dharmaraja of Abhaya family. Historian Snigdha Tripathy theorizes that Dharmaraja of Abhaya family and Charamparaja were members of the family that later came to be known as Shailodbhava. The rulers of this family acknowledged the suzerainty of the Vigraha and Mudgala dynasties, before the Gauda king Shashanka conquered the region.

The Shailodbhava inscriptions name the descendants of the mythical founder Shailodbhava as Aranabhita (alias Ranabhita), Sainyabhita I (alias Madhavaraja I), Yashobhita (alias Ayashobhita), and Madhavavarman (alias Madhavaraja II or Sainyabhita II). A 620-21 CE (300 Gupta era) inscription of Madhavaraja II shows that he was a feudatory of Shashanka. His predecessors Madhavaraja I and Ayashobhita may have been feudatories of Shashanka as well, although this cannot be said with certainty. Historian S. C. Behera attempted to identify Ayashobhita as Charamparaja.

=== As sovereigns ===
The Shailodbhava territory was known as Kongoda-mandala. Historian Snigdha Tripathy theorizes that after conquering present-day Odisha, the Gauda king Shashanka created the Kongoda-mandala province, and appointed Madhavaraja II as his feudatory of the region. This province was centred around the present-day Ganjam, Khordha and Puri districts. Its capital was Kongoda, which was located on the banks of the Salima river according to the dynasty's inscriptions. The town has been identified with modern Banapur, and the river with the modern Salia river.

Madhavaraja II seems to have gained independence soon after 620 CE, as his Khordha inscription does not mention any overlord. It describes him as Sakala-Kalingadhipati (the lord of the entire Kalinga), although there is no evidence to prove that he actually conquered the whole of Kalinga (the contemporary Ganga king Indravarman also claimed to have conquered the whole of Kalinga). Madhavaraja II may have declared independence taking advantage of Shashanka's conflict with the kings Harsha and Bhaskaravarman. It is also possible that he annexed some part of the Ganga territory, although this success must have been temporary. His inscriptions state that he performed the ashvamedha and other sacrifices, presumably to assert his independence.

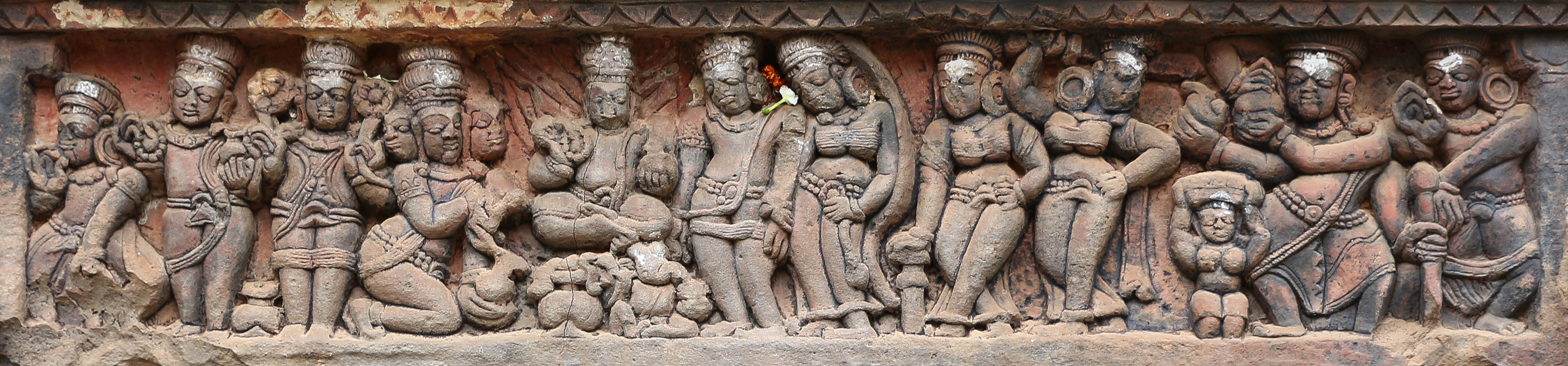
Parashurameshvara Temple sculptures

The inscriptions issued by Madhavaraja II in the later part of reign feature the myth of origin of the Shailodbhava dynasty. In accordance with the contemporary practices, this mythical origin may have been fabricated by a court poet after the dynasty became independent. The introductory part of these inscriptions is in verse form (instead of the prose form featured in the previous inscriptions). The style of the verse is similar to the one that features in the Aihole inscription of Pulakeshin II (Harsha may have invaded the region after Shashanka's death, and Pulakeshin later defeated Harsha).

During the reign of Madhavaraja II, around 638 CE, the Chinese pilgrim Xuanzang visited Kongoda (which he calls Kong-u-T'o). He described it as follows:

Within the limits of this country there are several tens of small towns which border on the mountains and are built contiguous to the sea. The cities themselves are strong and high; the soldiers are brave and daring; they rule by force the neighbouring provinces, so that no one can resist them. This country, bordering on the sea, abounds in many rare and valuable articles. They use cowrie shells and pearls in commercial transactions.

Madhavaraja II was succeeded by his son Madhyamaraja (alias Ayashobhita II), whose inscriptions also credit him with the performance of ashvamedha and other sacrifices. Epigraphic evidence suggests that he ruled for at least 26 years (up to the end of the 7th century), and his reign was peaceful and prosperous.

Madhyamaraja was succeeded by his son Dharmaraja (alias Manabhita). According to Dharmaraja's inscriptions, he defeated his elder brother Madhava (Madhavaraja III) at Phasika to gain the throne. After his defeat, Madhava fled and took asylum with king Tivara, but Dharmaraja killed both Madhava and Tivara. Dharmaraja was a strong ruler, and reigned for at least 30 years. In his Nimina (Nivina) inscription, he assumed the royal titles Paramabhattaraka, Maharajadhiraja, and Parameshvara.

=== Decline ===
The disintegration of the Shailodbhava kingdom seems to have started during the last days of the Dharmaraja's reign. His successor was his son Madhyamaraja II (alias Ayashobhita III), who did not have an heir to succeed him. According to a later inscription issued by Madhyamaraja III, he had a paternal cousin named Allaparaja, presumably a son of Madhavaraja III. The inscription describes Allaparaja's son Tailapanibha as the crown prince (yuvaraja). It is not known if Allaparaja or Tailapanibha ever ascended the throne: they may have died a premature death.

The last known member of the dynasty was Madhyamaraja III, who was probably a son of Tailapanibha. The Shailodbhavas fell into obscurity in the 8th century. Their territory appears to have become part of the Gangas of Shvetaka, who were vassals of the Bhauma-Kara king Unmattakesharin for some time. According to a 786-77 inscription, Ranaka Vishavarnava was appointed as a feudatory of the Kongoda-mandala, which was now a province of the Bhauma-Kara kingdom.

Some writers have attempted to connect the Shailodbhavas with the Shailendra dynasty of South-East Asia, and Shailavansha dynasty which ruled a kingdom in the present-day Balaghat district. However, these hypotheses are not supported by any concrete evidence.

== Religion ==
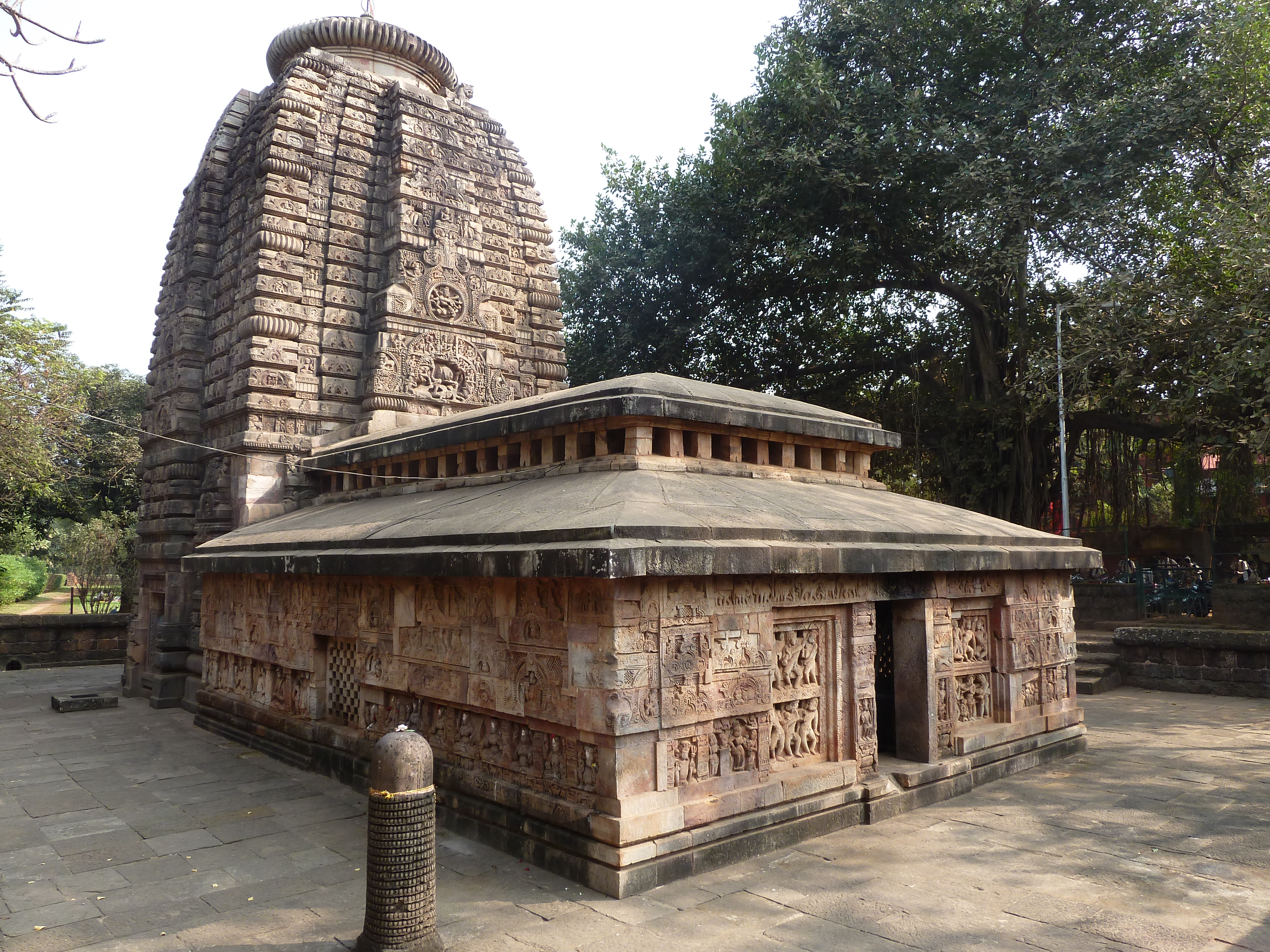
Parashurameshvara Temple

The Shailodbhava rulers followed Shaivism. Their myth of origin attributes the emergence of the dynasty's founder to Shiva. In addition, the Shailodbhava inscriptions begin with an invocation of Shiva, feature the Shaiva bull motif on the seal, and describe the king as parama-maheshvara (devotee of Shiva).

The oldest surviving temple in Bhubaneswar — the Parashurameshvara Shiva Temple — was probably built during the reign of Madhavaraja II.

== List of rulers ==
The Shailodbhava inscriptions provide the following genealogy (titles in italic, names in IAST):

- Shailodbhava (mythical founder)
- Raṇabhīta (alias Araṇabhīta), r. c. 6th century
- Mahārāja Mahāsāmanta Mādhavarāja I (alias Sainyabhīta I or Mādhavavarman I)
- Mahārāja Yaśhobhīta (alias Ayaśobhīta I); identified with Charamparāja by S. C. Behera
- Mahārāja Mahāsāmanta (later Sakala-Kalingadhipati) Mādhavarāja II (alias Mādhavavarman II, Mādhavendra, and Sainyabhīta II), r. c. 620-21 to 670-71
- Madhyamarāja I (alias Ayaśobhīta II), c. 670-71 to end of the 7th century
- Mādhavavarman III (alias Mādhava)
- Paramabhattaraka - Maharajadhiraja - Parameshvara Dharmarāja II (alias Mānabhīta), ruled till c. 726-727
- Madhyamarāja II (alias Ayaśobhīta III and Raṇakṣobha)
- Allaparāja
- Tailapanibha
- Madhyamarāja III

== Inscriptions ==
The following inscriptions of the Shailodbhava dynasty have been discovered:

Find spot	Issuer	Date
Ganjam	Madhavaraja II	Gupta era 300 (620-21 CE)
Khordha	Madhavaraja II	Unknown
Buguda	Madhavavarman II	Unknown
Purusottampur	Madhavavarman II	Regnal Year 13
Puri	Madhavavarman II	Regnal Year 13
Unknown (Now in Cuttack Museum)	Madhavavarman II	Regnal Year 50
Banapur	Madhyamaraja I	Unknown
Parikud	Madhyamaraja I	Regnal Year 26
Ranpur	Dharmaraja	Regnal Year 3
Nimina (Nivina)	Dharmaraja	Regnal Year 9(?)
Banapur	Dharmaraja	Unknown
Puri	Dharmaraja	Regnal Year 12
Chandeswar	Dharmaraja	Regnal Year 18
Unknown (issued at Kondedda)	Dharmaraja	Regnal Year 30
Tekkali	Madhyamaraja III	Unknown
Dharakote	Unknown	Unknown
