= Puri Lok Sabha constituency =

Lok Sabha constituency in Odisha

Coordinates: 19.8°N 85.8°E

Puri OD-17
- Lok Sabha constituency
- Interactive Map Outlining Puri Lok Sabha constituency

Constituency details
- Country: India
- Region: East India
- State: Odisha
- Assembly constituencies: Puri; Brahmagiri; Satyabadi; Pipili; Chilika; Ranpur; Nayagarh
- Established: 1952
- Total electors: 15,89,698 (Note: as on 2024) (Note: as data published by election commission)
- Reservation: None

Member of Parliament
- 18th Lok Sabha
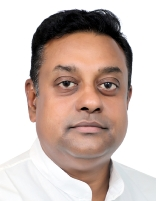
- Incumbent Sambit Patra
- Party: BJP
- Elected year: 2024

Puri Lok Sabha Constituency is one of the 21 Lok Sabha (Parliamentary) Constituencies in Odisha state in Eastern India.

== Assembly Segments ==
Assembly Constituencies which constitute this Parliamentary Constituency, after delimitation of Parliamentary Constituencies and Legislative Assembly Constituencies of 2008 are:

#	Name	District	Member	Party	Leading (in 2024)
107	Puri	Puri	Sunil Kumar Mohanty	BJD	BJP
108	Brahmagiri	Puri	Upasna Mohapatra	BJP	BJP
109	Satyabadi	Puri	Om Prakash Mishra	BJP	BJP
110	Pipili	Puri	Ashrit Pattanayak	BJP	BJP
118	Chilika	Khurda	Prithiviraj Harichandan	BJP	BJP
119	Ranpur	Nayagarh	Surama Padhy	BJP	BJP
122	Nayagarh	Nayagarh	Arun Kumar Sahoo	BJD	BJP

Assembly Constituencies which constituted this Parliamentary Constituency, before delimitation of Parliamentary Constituencies and Legislative Assembly Constituencies of 2008 are: Baliapatana, Pipili, Satyabadi, Puri, Brahmagiri, Chilka and Ranpur.

== Elected members ==
Vote share of winning candidates
2024	52.58%
2019	47.38%
2014	37.25%
2009	33.03%
2004	51.99%
1999	57.98%
1998	51.51%
1996	51.82%
1991	48.69%
1989	59.85%
1984	52.56%
1980	59.87%
1977	62.2%
1971	40.47%

Since its formation in 1952, 18 elections have been held till date.

List of members elected from Puri constituency are

Year	Name	Party
1952	Lokenath Mishra	Indian National Congress
1957	Chintamani Panigrahi	Communist Party of India
1962	Bibudhendra Mishra	Indian National Congress
1967	Rabi Ray	Samyukta Socialist Party
1971	Banamali Patnaik	Indian National Congress
1977	Padmacharan Samantasinhar	Bharatiya Lok Dal
1980	Brajamohan Mohanty	Indian National Congress (I)
1984	Brajamohan Mohanty	Indian National Congress
1989	Nilamani Routray	Janata Dal
1991	Braja Kishore Tripathy	Janata Dal
1996	Pinaki Misra	Indian National Congress
1998	Braja Kishore Tripathy	Biju Janata Dal
1999	Braja Kishore Tripathy	Biju Janata Dal
2004	Braja Kishore Tripathy	Biju Janata Dal
2009	Pinaki Misra	Biju Janata Dal
2014	Pinaki Misra	Biju Janata Dal
2019	Pinaki Misra	Biju Janata Dal
2024	Sambit Patra	Bharatiya Janata Party

== Election results ==
=== 2024 ===
Voting were held on 25th May 2024 in 6th phase of Indian General Election. Counting of votes was on 4th June 2024. In 2024 election, Bharatiya Janata Party candidate Sambit Patra defeated Biju Janata Dal candidate Arup Mohan Patnaik by a margin of 1,04,709 votes.

2024 Indian general election: Puri
Party	Candidate	Votes	%	±%
BJP	Sambit Patra	629,330	52.58	▲6.21
BJD	Arup Mohan Patnaik	5,24,621	43.83	▼3.57
INC	Jay Narayan Patnaik	24,342	2.03	▼1.91
NOTA	None of the above	7,610	0.64	Steady
Majority		104,709	8.75	▲7.72
Turnout		12,01,434	75.58	▲2.86
BJP gain from BJD				

=== 2019 ===
In 2019 election, Biju Janata Dal candidate Pinaki Misra defeated Bharatiya Janata Party candidate Sambit Patra with a margin of 11,714 votes.

2019 Indian general elections: Puri
Party	Candidate	Votes	%	±%
BJD	Pinaki Misra	538,321	47.40	▼2.93
BJP	Sambit Patra	5,26,607	46.37	▲25.61
INC	Satya Prakash Nayak	44,734	3.94	▼21.06
NOTA	None of the above	7,217	0.64	▼0.24
Majority		11,714	1.03	▼24.31
Turnout		11,36,124	72.72	▼1.99
Registered electors		15,62,331		
BJD hold				

=== 2014 ===
In 2014 election, Biju Janata Dal candidate Pinaki Misra defeated Indian National Congress candidate Sucharita Mohanty by a margin of 2,63,361 votes.

2014 Indian general elections: Puri
Party	Candidate	Votes	%	±%
BJD	Pinaki Misra	523,161	50.33	
INC	Sucharita Mohanty	2,59,800	25.00	
BJP	Ashok Sahu	2,15,763	20.76	
NOTA	None of the above	9,150	0.88	−
Majority		2,63,361	25.34	−
Turnout		10,39,487	74.01	
Registered electors		14,04,581		
BJD hold				

=== 2009 ===
In 2009 election, Biju Janata Dal candidate Pinaki Misra defeated Indian National Congress candidate Debendra Nath Mansingh by a margin of 2,11,305 votes.

2009 Indian general elections: Puri
Party	Candidate	Votes	%	±%
BJD	Pinaki Misra	436,961	47.98	
INC	Debendra Nath Mansingh	2,25,656	24.78	
BJP	Braja Kishore Tripathy	2,09,287	22.98	
Majority		2,11,305	23.22	
Turnout		9,10,431	68.83	
BJD hold				
