= Puri Assembly constituency =

Constituency of the Odisha legislative assembly in India

Coordinates: 19.81°N 85.82°E

Puri
- Constituency No. 107 for the Odisha Legislative Assembly
- Puri Assembly constituency in Puri district

Constituency details
- Country: India
- Region: East India
- State: Odisha
- Division: Central Division
- District: Puri
- Lok Sabha constituency: Puri
- Established: 1951
- Total electors: 2,40,287 (Note: as on 2024) (Note: as data published by election commission)
- Reservation: None

Member of Legislative Assembly
- 17th Odisha Legislative Assembly
- Incumbent Sunil Kumar Mohanty
- Party: Biju Janata Dal
- Elected year: 2024

Puri is a Vidhan Sabha constituency of Puri district, Odisha.

This constituency includes Puri, and 15 Gram panchayats (Birapratappur, Balipada, Jamarsuan, Baliput, Raigoroda, Garhmrugasira, Chalisbatia, Malatipatpur, Chandanpur, Sasandamodarpur, Samanga, Gopinathpur, Harekrushnapur, Baliguali and Talajanga) of Puri sadar block and three GPs (Itibhuan, Garhbhingura and Chhaitana) of Gop block.

== Elected members ==
Vote share of winning candidates
2024	45.84%
2019	43.28%
2014	53.44%
2009	51.58%
2004	53.61%
2000	53.65%
1995	33.55%
1991 (bypoll)	49.38%
1990	73.20%
1985	50.89%
1980	50.65%
1977	61.93%

Since its formation in 1951, 18 elections have been held here till date including one bypoll in 1991.

List of members elected from Puri constituency are:

Year	Member	Party
2024	Sunil Kumar Mohanty	Biju Janata Dal
2019	Jayanta Kumar Sarangi	Bharatiya Janata Party
2014	Maheswar Mohanty	Biju Janata Dal
2009	Maheswar Mohanty	Biju Janata Dal
2004	Maheswar Mohanty	Biju Janata Dal
2000	Maheswar Mohanty	Biju Janata Dal
1995	Maheswar Mohanty	Janata Dal
1991 (bypoll) (Note: Resignation of Braja Kishore Tripathy on his election to Lok Sabha)	Uma Ballav Rath	Janata Dal
1990	Braja Kishore Tripathy	Janata Dal
1985	Braja Kishore Tripathy	Janata Party
1980	Gadadhar Mishra	Indian National Congress (I)
1977	Braja Kishore Tripathy	Janata Party
1974	Braja Kishore Tripathy	Indian National Congress
1971	Brajamohan Mohanty	Indian National Congress (R)
1967	Harihar Bahinipati	Praja Socialist Party
1961	Bhagwan Pratihari	Indian National Congress
1957	Harihar Bahinipati	Praja Socialist Party
1951	Fakir Charan Das	Socialist Party

== Election results ==
=== 2024 ===
Voting were held on 25 May 2024 in 3rd phase of Odisha Assembly Election & 6th phase of Indian General Election. Counting of votes is on 4 June 2024. In 2024 election, Biju Janata Dal candidate Sunil Kumar Mohanty defeated Bharatiya Janata Party candidate Jayanta Kumar Sarangi by a margin of 5,178 votes.

2024 Odisha Vidhan Sabha Election, Puri
Party	Candidate	Votes	%	±%
BJD	Sunil Kumar Mohanty	74,709	45.84	▲5.63
BJP	Jayanta Kumar Sarangi	69,531	42.66	▼0.62
INC	Uma Ballav Rath	13,169	8.08	▲6.14
NOTA	None of the above	918	0.56	▼0.26
Majority		5,178	3.16	
Turnout		1,62,982	67.83	
BJD gain from BJP				

=== 2019 ===
In 2019 election, Bharatiya Janata Party candidate Jayanta Kumar Sarangi defeated Biju Janata Dal candidate Maheswar Mohanty by a margin of 4,008 votes.

2019 Vidhan Sabha election, Puri
Party	Candidate	Votes	%	±%
BJP	Jayanta Kumar Sarangi	76,747	43.28	
BJD	Maheswar Mohanty	72,739	40.21	
INC	Auro Prasad Mishra	2,934	1.94	
NOTA	None of the above	1,281	0.82	
Majority		4,008	3.07	
Turnout		1,55,722	63.96	
BJP gain from BJD				

=== 2014 ===
In the 2014 election, Biju Janata Dal candidate Maheswar Mohanty defeated Indian National Congress candidate Uma Ballav Rath by a margin of 34,721 votes.

2014 Odisha Legislative Assembly election: Puri
Party	Candidate	Votes	%	±%
BJD	Maheswar Mohanty	76,760	53.44	▲1.86
INC	Uma Ballav Rath	42,039	29.27	▲23.52
BJP	Krushna Chandra Panda	17,560	12.23	▼28.09
NOTA	None of the above	1,526	1.06	−
Majority		34,721	24.17	
Turnout		1,43,627	64.73	▲7.06
Registered electors		2,21,892		
BJD hold				

=== 2009 ===
In 2009 election, Biju Janata Dal candidate Maheswar Mohanty defeated Bharatiya Janata Party candidate Uma Ballav Rath by a margin of 13,394 votes.

2009 Vidhan Sabha election, Puri
Party	Candidate	Votes	%	±%
BJD	Maheswar Mohanty	61,328	51.58	−
BJP	Uma Ballav Rath	47,934	40.32	−
INC	Uttam Kumar Acharya	4,832	3.75	−
Majority		13,394	11.27 (Note: % of total valid votes)	−
Turnout		1,18,889	57.67	▼2.71
BJD hold				
