= Lokanath Misra =

Indian politician

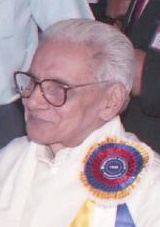

Governor of Assam
- In office 17 March 1991 – 1 September 1997
- Preceded by: Devi Das Thakur
- Succeeded by: Srinivas Kumar Sinha

Governor of Nagaland
- In office 13 April 1992 – 1 October 1993
- Preceded by: M. M. Thomas
- Succeeded by: V. K. Nayyar

Governor of Arunachal Pradesh
- In office 17 March 1991 – 25 March 1991
- Preceded by: Devi Das Thakur
- Succeeded by: Surendranath Dwivedy

Member of the Rajya Sabha
- In office 3 April 1960 – 2 April 1978
- Constituency: Odisha

Personal details
- Born: 21 November 1922 Banapur, Khordha, Bihar-Orissa, British India
- Died: 27 May 2009 (aged 87) Bhubaneswar, Odisha, India
- Party: Janata Party
- Other political affiliations: Swatantra Party
- Spouse: Binapani Misra
- Children: Pinaki Misra; Anuradha Misra

Lokanath Misra (22 November 1921 – 27 May 2009) was an Indian politician. Initially a member of Indian National Congress, he joined Swatantra Party and later Janata Party. He served as a member of the Rajya Sabha from 1960 till 1978.

== Early life ==
He was the Governor of Assam from 1991 to 1997 and held additional charge as Governor of Nagaland from 1992 to 1993.

He was the elder son of poet and notable socialist Godabarish Mishra. His younger brother, Ranganath Misra was the former Chief Justice of India while his son, Pinaki Misra has been a member of the 11th, 15th and 16th Lok Sabha representing Puri constituency. He died on 27 May 2009 at Bhubaneswar.

Government offices
| Preceded by Devi Das Thakur | Governor of Assam; 17 March 1991 – 1 September 1997 | Succeeded by Srinivas Kumar Sinha |
| Preceded by M. M. Thomas | Governor of Nagaland; 13 April 1992 – 1 October 1993 | Succeeded by V. K. Nayyar |
| Preceded by Devi Das Thakur | Governor of Arunachal Pradesh; 17 March 1991 – 25 March 1991 | Succeeded by Surendranath Dwivedy |
