= Satyabadi Assembly constituency =

Constituency of the Odisha legislative assembly in India

Coordinates: 19.95°N 85.82°E

Satyabadi
- Constituency No. 109 for the Odisha Legislative Assembly
- Satyabadi Assembly Constituency in Puri district

Constituency details
- Country: India
- Region: East India
- State: Odisha
- Division: Central Division
- District: Puri
- Lok Sabha constituency: Puri
- Established: 1951
- Total electors: 2,15,326 (Note: as on 2024) (Note: as data published by election commission)
- Reservation: None

Member of Legislative Assembly
- 17th Odisha Legislative Assembly
- Incumbent Om Prakash Mishra
- Party: Bharatiya Janata Party
- Elected year: 2024

Satyabadi is a Vidhan Sabha constituency of Puri district, Odisha.

This constituency includes Satyabadi block and Kanas block.

== Elected members ==
Vote share of winning candidates
2024	53.33%
2019	51.45%
2009	35.56%
2004	42.51%
2000	46.23%
1995	45.39%
1990	50.51%
1985	52.55%
1980	55.68%
1977	46.99%

Since its formation in 1951, 17 elections were held till date.

List of members elected from Satyabadi constituency are:

Year	Member	Party
2024	Om Prakash Mishra	Bharatiya Janata Party
2019	Umakanta Samantaray	Biju Janata Dal
2014	Umakanta Samantaray	Independent politician
2009	Prasad Kumar Harichandan	Indian National Congress
2004	Ramaranjan Baliarsingh	Independent politician
2000	Prasad Kumar Harichandan	Indian National Congress
1995	Prasad Kumar Harichandan	Indian National Congress
1990	Chandramadhab Mishra	Janata Dal
1985	Rabindra Kumar Das	Indian National Congress
1980	Rabindra Kumar Das	Indian National Congress (I)
1977	Chandramadhab Mishra	Janata Party
1974	Gangadhar Mohapatra	Indian National Congress
1971	Chandramadhab Mishra	Independent politician
1967	Gangadhar Mohapatra	Indian National Congress
1961	Rajraj Deb	Swatantra Party
1957	Nilakantha Das	Indian National Congress
1951	Nilakantha Das	Independent politician

== Election results ==
=== 2024 ===
Voting were held on 25 May 2024 in 3rd phase of Odisha Assembly Election & 6th phase of Indian General Election. Counting of votes was on 4 June 2024. In 2024 election, Bharatiya Janata Party candidate Om Prakash Mishra defeated Biju Janata Dal candidate Sanjaya Kumar Dash Barma by a margin of 17,708 votes.

2024 Odisha Vidhan Sabha Election, Satyabadi
Party	Candidate	Votes	%	±%
BJP	Om Prakash Mishra	87,294	53.33	
BJD	Sanjay Kumar Das Burma	69,586	42.52	
Independent	Kamakshya Prasad Pradhan	2,557	1.56	
INC	Manoj Rath	2,199	1.34	
NOTA	None of the above	477	0.29	
Majority		17,708	10.81	
Turnout		1,63,672	76.01	
BJP gain from BJD				

=== 2019 ===
In 2019 election, Biju Janata Dal candidate Umakanta Samantaray defeated Bharatiya Janata Party candidate Om Prakash Mishra by a margin of 17,812 votes.

2019 Odisha Legislative Assembly election: Satyabadi
Party	Candidate	Votes	%	±%
BJD	Umakanta Samantaray	80,537	51.45	
BJP	Om Prakash Mishra	62,725	40.07	
INC	Prasad Kumar Harichandan	11,273	7.20	
NOTA	None of the above	655	0.42	
Majority		17,812	11.38	
Turnout		1,56,528	75.03	
BJD gain from Independent				

=== 2014 ===
In 2014 election, Independent candidate Umakanta Samantaray defeated Biju Janata Dal candidate Ramaranjan Baliarsingh by a margin of 1,532 votes.

2014 Vidhan Sabha Election, Satyabadi
Party	Candidate	Votes	%	±%
Independent	Umakanta Samantaray	48,319	33.52	−
BJD	Ramaranjan Baliarsingh	46,787	32.46	−
INC	Prasad Kumar Harichandan	25,905	17.97	−
Independent	Om Prakash Mishra	15,068	10.45	
BJP	Biswanath Rath	5,550	3.85	−
NOTA	None of the above	683	0.47	−
Majority		1,532	1.06	
Turnout		1,44,132	75.17	
Independent gain from INC				

=== 2009 ===
In 2009 election, Indian National Congress candidate Prasad Kumar Harichandan defeated Biju Janata Dal candidate Umakanta Samantaray by a margin of 8,280 votes.

2009 Vidhan Sabha Election, Satyabadi
Party	Candidate	Votes	%	±%
INC	Prasad Kumar Harichandan	44,862	35.56	▼4.18
BJD	Umakanta Samantaray	36,582	29.00	▲16.88
Independent	Ramaranjan Baliarsingh	31,987	25.35	−
BJP	Krushna Chandra Jagadev	7,914	6.27	−
Majority		8,280	6.56 (Note: % of total valid votes)	−
Turnout		1,26,165	70.96	−
INC gain from Independent		Swing	▼0.6	
