= Ranganath Misra =

21st Chief Justice of India

Hon'ble Chief Justice (Retd.) Ranganath Misra
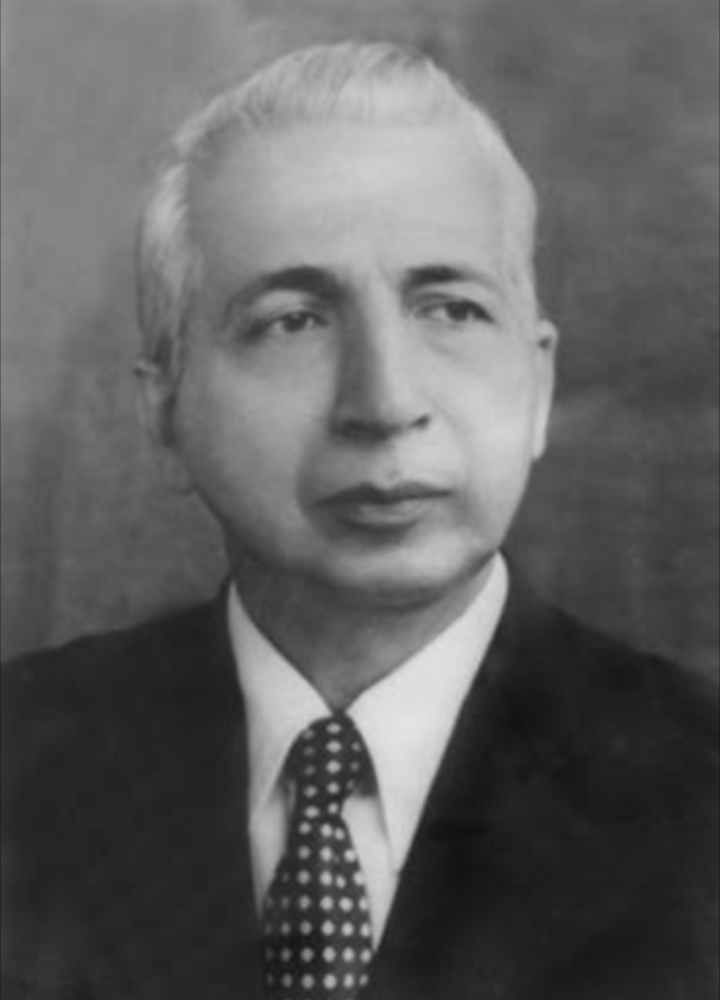

Member of Parliament, Rajya Sabha
- In office 1998–2004
- Constituency: Odisha

1st chairman of National Human Rights Commission of India
- In office 12 October 1993 – 24 November 1996
- Appointed by: S. D. Sharma
- Preceded by: Position established
- Succeeded by: M. N. Venkatachaliah

21st Chief Justice of India
- In office 25 September 1990 – 24 November 1991
- Appointed by: R. Venkataraman
- Preceded by: Sabyasachi Mukharji
- Succeeded by: Kamal Narain Singh

Judge of Supreme Court of India
- In office 15 March 1983 – 25 September 1990
- Nominated by: Y. V. Chandrachud
- Appointed by: Giani Zail Singh

10th Chief Justice of Orissa High Court
- In office 16 January 1981 – 14 March 1983
- Nominated by: Y. V. Chandrachud
- Appointed by: Neelam Sanjiva Reddy
- Preceded by: Sukanta Kishore Ray
- Succeeded by: Dambarudhar Pathak; Prafulla Kishore Mohanty (acting)

Judge of Orissa High Court
- In office 4 July 1969 – 15 January 1981; Acting CJ : 6 November 1980 - 15 January 1981
- Nominated by: M. Hidayatullah
- Appointed by: V. V. Giri (Then Acting President of India)

Personal details
- Born: 25 November 1926 Banapur, Bihar and Orissa Province, British India
- Died: 13 September 2012 (aged 85) Bhubaneswar, Odisha, India
- Party: Indian National Congress
- Relations: Lokanath Misra (brother); Dipak Misra and Pinaki Misra (nephew)
- Parent: Godavaris Mishra
- Education: Ravenshaw College; Allahabad University

Ranganath Misra (25 November 1926 – 13 September 2012) was an Indian jurist, who served as the 21st Chief Justice of India, from 25 September 1990 to 24 November 1991. He was also the first chairman of the National Human Rights Commission of India. He also served as Member of Parliament in Rajya Sabha from the Congress Party between 1998 and 2004. He is the second Supreme Court judge to become a Rajya Sabha member after Baharul Islam who was also elected as Indian National Congress member.

== Background and family ==
Misra was born on 25 November 1926 in Banapur, Odisha into an Utkal Brahmin family. His father, Pandit Godabarish Misra, was an Odia litterateur and congress politician who became education minister of Orissa state in 1941 while India was still under British rule. In this capacity, Godabarish was instrumental in the founding of Utkal University.

Ranganath was the youngest of his parents' three sons. His eldest brother, Lokanath Misra, was a prominent politician belonging to Swatantra Party (led by Rajaji) and later the Janata Party. He served for several terms as a member of the Rajya Sabha (upper house of Indian parliament) and also as governor of Assam and Nagaland. Loknath Misra's son, Pinaki Misra, is a Lok Sabha MP belonging to the Biju Janata Dal. Ranganath's second brother, Raghunath Misra, was a politician belonging to the Congress Party who was elected to the Orissa Legislative Assembly from the Banpur constituency. Raghunath's son, Dipak Misra was the 45th Chief Justice of India; he was in office from 28 August 2017 to 2 October 2018.

Ranganath studied at Banpur High School and P.M. Academy and later at Ravenshaw College and Allahabad University. At a young age, he was married to Sumitra Misra, a woman of his own community and similar background, in a match arranged by their families in the usual Indian way. In 1950, they had a son, Devananda Misra, who became a lawyer and a senior advocate in the Supreme Court and the Orissa High Court. In 2009, Misra and his wife suffered a tremendous personal loss with the death of their son, Devananda Misra, who died aged 59.

== Career ==
On 18 September 1950, Misra got enrolled as advocate of Orissa High Court, Cuttack, where he practiced law until 1969, when he was appointed a Permanent Judge of the Orissa High Court. He served as the acting Chief Justice of the Orissa High Court from 6 November 1980 to 16 January 1981, and on the latter date, he took office as permanent Chief Justice of the Orissa High court. He was appointed Judge of the Supreme Court of India in 1983. He became the Chief Justice of the Supreme Court of India on 25 September 1990 and retired on 24 November 1991.

Over the course of his Supreme Court tenure, Misra authored 314 judgments and sat on 821 benches.

=== 1984 anti-Sikh riot report ===
Ranganath Misra was the sole member of the Justice Ranganath Misra Commission of Inquiry, a commission that headed the investigation of 1984 anti-Sikh riots and gave its report in 1986. Jagjit Singh Aurora, the former General Officer Commanding-in-Chief of the Indian Army and a member of the Citizen's Justice Committee, commented that "The terms of reference of the commission were biased against the victims, the victims were forced to come to the investigation with the burden of proof on them". He indicted 19 workers of the Congress Party who were charged by the People's Union for Civil Liberties of having abetted the riots, but gave clean chit to the Congress Party.

=== National Commission for Religious and Linguistic Minorities ===
The National Commission for Religious and Linguistic Minorities was constituted by the Government of India on 29 October 2004 to examine various issues related to linguistic and religious minorities in India. The commission was chaired by Justice Misra, who also lent it its eponymous name, Ranganath Misra Commission. The commission submitted its report on 21 May 2007, wherein it recommended Scheduled Caste reservation for Dalit converts to Christianity and Islam.

== Retirement and death ==
He served as the Chief Scout of the All India Boy Scouts Association since 1992. He became the first Chairman of the National Human Rights Commission of India in 1993. He was member of Rajya Sabha from 1998 to 2004 from the Congress Party headed by Sonia Gandhi.

After prolonged illness, Ranganath Misra died on 13 September 2012 at a private hospital in Bhubaneswar. He was survived by his wife Sumitra Misra and grandson Anand Misra.

Legal offices
| Preceded by Sabyasachi Mukharji | Chief Justice of India; 1990–1991 | Succeeded by Kamal Narain Singh |

| Preceded by Cheppudira Muthanna Poonacha | Governor of Odisha; 25 June 1982 - 31 August 1982 | Succeeded by Cheppudira Muthanna Poonacha |
