= Godabarish Misra =

Indian writer

Pandit Godabarish Mishra
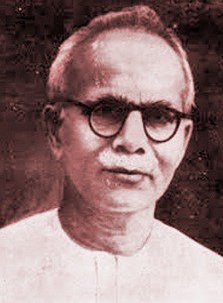
- Born: Godabarish Mishra; 26 October 1886; Srinibaspur Sasan, Banapur, Puri, Odisha, India
- Died: 26 July 1956 (aged 69)
- Education: B.A. in Philosophy, M.A. in Economics
- Alma mater: Ravenshaw College, University of Calcutta
- Known for: Social reformer, Politician, Editor, Columnist, Writer
- Children: Ranganath Mishra, Loknath Mishra, Raghunath Mishra
- Parent(s): Lingaraj Mishra & Apsara Devi
- Awards: Kendra Sahitya Academy Award (1961)

Pandit Godabarish Mishra (26 October 1886 – 26 July 1956) was a poet and notable socialist from Odisha, India. He is known for his contribution to Odia literature.

== Early life ==
Godabarish Mishra was born to Lingaraj Mishra and Apsara Devi in a Brahmin family in Srinibaspur Sasan, near Banapur, Khordha district. His primary education was from the village school and then received his higher education from the Puri District School in 1906 and enrolled in Ravenshaw College. He used to take tuition to cover the college fees. He received his B.A. in philosophy in 1910. He obtained his M.A. in economics from University of Calcutta in 1912.

== Work ==
=== In teaching ===
He was a teacher in the Satyabadi School from 1913 to 1919. Then, he became the headmaster of Chakradharpur High School in the Singhbhum district (Now in Jharkhand) from 1919 to 1921. He was sent there with the aim of preserving the Odia language in the district of Singhbhum by Pandit Gopabandhu Das. After taking part in the non-cooperation movement, he returned to his home village in 1922 and was involved in establishing new schools, small-scale industries, farms and social welfare organizations.

=== The Samaja ===
In 1928 he became the Editor of The Samaja, an Orissa local newspaper, holding that position for approximately two years, after the founder died.

=== In Utkal Samilani ===
He was associated with Utkal Sammilani from 1919 to 1955. He was the President of the Utkal Samilani Special Conference held at Berhampur in 1955. He met Gopabandhu Das by chance while staying in a hostel. He was one of Gopabandhu's "Pancahsakha" (five friends).

=== Social reformer ===
Although he belonged to a conservative Brahmin family, Mishra was a socialist. He was against caste discrimination. He didn't wear his sacred thread and also wore a moustache, which was against the Brahmin caste system.

=== Participation in the Non-cooperation Movement ===
He participated in the non-cooperation movement of 1921. He was the head of Singhbhum DCC and led the campaigns in Chakradharpur and adjacent areas.

== Political life ==
Inspired by Mahatma Gandhi and Pandit Gopabandhu Das, he joined the Congress party and was a member of the Vidhan Sabha (Lower House) of the Odisha Legislative Assembly. He was the member of the district board from 1924 to 1933. He was a member of Odisha Vidhan Sabha from 1937 till his death, with the exception of a five-year break. During this time he did not hold a post in the Orissa congress, due to political differences. When the Orissa ministry of congress was created he was not included in the ministry. He became a Vidhan Sabha member in 1952 as an independent candidate. He served in the Vidhan Sabha as an eminent administrator and member of the opposition party. He left Congress in 1939 and joined the Forward Block. He served as finance and education minister in the ministry of the Maharaja of Parlakhemundi from 1941 to 1944. During his stay as minister in 1943 he played an important role in the establishment of Utkal University, Cuttack High court and various colleges in Puri, Baleshwar and Sambalpur.

== Literary works ==
His work includes many essays, stories, novels, poems, biographies and translations. His poems played a crucial role in creating awareness towards that nation. His dramas Purushottama Deba, Mukunda Deba and autobiographical work Ardha Shatabdi Ra Orissa O Tahin Re Mo Sthana are some of his significant contributions to the Oriya literature. He was also a competent editor. He published magazine Lokamukha from Banapur in 1924. He also used to write for the Eastcoast (An English paper) published by Sashi Bhusan Rath. He was awarded a doctorate in literature from Utkal University. Some of his published works are as below

- Purushottama Deba
- Mukunda Deba
- Ardha Shatabdi Ra Orissa O Tahin Re Mo Sthana
- Godabarisa Parikrama
- Pilanka Kahinki
- Chatani
- Atharasaha satara
- Godabarisa Granthabali
