= Sambit Patra =

Indian politician (born 1974)

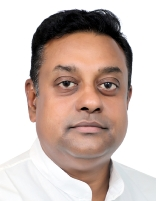
- Official Portrait

Member of Parliament, Lok Sabha
- Incumbent
- Assumed office 4 June 2024
- Preceded by: Pinaki Mishra
- Constituency: Puri

National Spokesperson Bharatiya Janata Party
- Incumbent
- Assumed office 2014

Chairman of India Tourism Development Corporation
- Incumbent
- Assumed office 30 November 2021

Personal details
- Born: 13 December 1974 (age 51) Bokaro, Bihar (now Jharkhand), India
- Party: Bharatiya Janata Party
- Education: Royal College of Surgeons of England, London (MRCS); Srirama Chandra Bhanja Medical College and Hospital, Cuttack (M.S); Veer Surendra Sai Institute of Medical Sciences and Research, Sambalpur (M.B.B.S)
- Occupation: Surgeon; politician

Sambit Patra (born 13 December 1974) is an Indian politician and surgeon who has served as the Member of Parliament from the Puri constituency since 4 June 2024. He has served as the national spokesperson of the Bharatiya Janata Party since 2014 and currently serving as a chairman in tourism department since November 2021. Patra had his first job at Hindu Rao Hospital. He was appointed an independent director of the board of Oil and Natural Gas Corporation Limited (ONGC) in 2017. On 30 November 2021, Patra was appointed Chairman of the India Tourism Development Corporation.

== Early life and education ==
Patra was born on 13 December 1974 in Bokaro Steel City, Jharkhand (then Dhanbad district, Bihar) to an Odia family. His father, Rabindra Nath Patra, was an employee at the Bokaro Steel Plant, and his mother is Bharti Patra. He completed his primary and intermediate schooling at Chinmaya Vidyalaya in Bokaro.

Patra obtained his MBBS degree from the Veer Surendra Sai Institute of Medical Sciences and Research (VSS Medical College) in Burla, Sambalpur, in 1997. He subsequently earned a Master of Surgery (MS) in General Surgery from the Srirama Chandra Bhanja Medical College and Hospital (SCB Medical College) in Cuttack in 2002.

== Political career ==
=== Party leadership and early career ===
Patra began his political career in 2010 when he joined the Bharatiya Janata Party (BJP) as a spokesperson for its Delhi unit. In 2012, he unsuccessfully contested the Delhi municipal corporation election as the BJP candidate from the Kashmiri Gate ward, following which he resigned from his medical career at Hindu Rao Hospital to pursue full-time politics. During the 2014 Indian general election campaign, he gained visibility on national television as a commentator for the party. Following the election of the National Democratic Alliance (NDA) government, Patra was promoted to national spokesperson of the BJP.

=== Public appointments and legislative career ===
In September 2017, the Appointments Committee of the Cabinet appointed Patra as a non-official independent director on the board of the Oil and Natural Gas Corporation (ONGC) for a three-year term. On 30 November 2021, the central government appointed him as the Chairman of the India Tourism Development Corporation (ITDC).

Patra contested the parliamentary seat for the Puri Lok Sabha constituency during the 2019 general election, where he finished as the runner-up, losing to the incumbent Biju Janata Dal (BJD) candidate, Pinaki Misra, by a margin of 11,700 votes (1.03%). In the 2024 general election, he contested the Puri seat again as the BJP candidate and was elected to the Lok Sabha, defeating BJD candidate Arup Mohan Patnaik by a margin of 104,709 votes. Following his entry into Parliament, Lok Sabha Speaker Om Birla nominated Patra as a member of the Press Council of India in May 2025.

=== Appointment as North-East coordinator ===
On 17 August 2026, Patra was appointed the Bharatiya Janata Party's coordinator for the North-East region as part of the party's organisational changes. The appointment was announced by BJP national president Nitin Nabin and took effect immediately.

Before the appointment, Patra served as the BJP's North-East in-charge, overseeing party-related coordination in the region, including political developments in Manipur.

== Legal disputes and media controversies ==
=== ONGC appointment challenge ===
Patra's 2017 appointment to the ONGC board was legally challenged via a public interest litigation (PIL) filed by the non-governmental organisation Energy Watchdog in the Delhi High Court. The petitioners argued that his position as an active political spokesperson violated provisions regarding independent directors under the Companies Act, 2013. In November 2017, the Delhi High Court dismissed the petition, ruling that the allegations were unsubstantiated and stating that political party membership did not inherently disqualify an individual from discharging corporate duties.

=== Social media and communication disputes ===
As a prominent media strategist, Patra's online output has been the subject of several public and legal complaints:

- Doctored video allegations (2020–2021): In February 2020, a police complaint was registered against Patra in Mumbai after he shared an edited video clip of a Congress politician. In November 2021, a Delhi court ordered the registration of an FIR against him for posting a video of Delhi Chief Minister Arvind Kejriwal regarding farm laws, which the court found to be "doctored" and shared with the intent to cause public mischief.
- "Toolkit" investigation (2021): In May 2021, Patra tweeted screenshots of a document he claimed was an opposition "toolkit" designed to malign the government during the COVID-19 pandemic. Twitter labelled the post as "manipulated media," leading to a dispute between the central government and the platform.
- Defamation proceedings (2021): In April 2021, the Chhattisgarh High Court quashed an FIR that had been registered against Patra for his tweets concerning former Prime Ministers Jawaharlal Nehru and Rajiv Gandhi, ruling that the statements, while political in nature, did not legally constitute a public order offence under the Indian Penal Code.

=== Religious remarks ===
In May 2024, during the general election campaign in Puri, Patra attracted criticism after stating in a media interview that "Lord Jagannath is a devotee (bhakt) of Prime Minister Narendra Modi," a reversal of the traditional religious belief that humans are devotees of the deity. The comment drew condemnation from Odisha Chief Minister Naveen Patnaik, who called it an "insult to the Lord". Patra subsequently clarified that it was a "slip of the tongue" caused by the crowded environment and announced he would observe a three-day fast as penance to seek forgiveness.

=== Alleged violation of conduct rules ===
In November 2022, the Aam Aadmi Party (AAP) filed a formal complaint demanding Patra's removal as Chairman of the India Tourism Development Corporation (ITDC). The complaint alleged that Patra's active participation in election campaigning for the BJP in Gujarat while holding a public office violated the Central Civil Services (Conduct) Rules, which restrict political activities by government officials. Patra did not publicly respond to the specific procedural allegations at the time.
