= Ramaranjan Baliarsingh =

Indian politician

Member of the Odisha Legislative Assembly
- In office 2004–2009
- Preceded by: Prasad Kumar Harichandan
- Succeeded by: Prasad Kumar Harichandan
- Constituency: Satyabadi

Personal details
- Born: Odisha, India
- Party: Biju Janata Dal (2024–present); Bharatiya Janata Party (2018–2024); Independent (2004–2009)
- Relations: Barsha Singh Bariha (daughter-in-law)
- Education: M.Com
- Alma mater: Utkal University

Ramaranjan Baliarsingh (also spelled Rama Ranjan Baliarsingh) is an Indian politician from Odisha. He is a former Member of the Legislative Assembly (MLA) who represented the Satyabadi Assembly constituency in the Odisha Legislative Assembly from 2004 to 2009.

== Political career ==
Baliarsingh entered the Odisha Legislative Assembly in 2004, winning the Satyabadi seat as an Independent politician.

He later joined the Biju Janata Dal (BJD) but resigned from the party in January 2018, alleging bureaucratic interference in party affairs. Following his resignation, he joined the Bharatiya Janata Party (BJP) in 2018. However, in May 2024, prior to the general elections, he resigned from the BJP and returned to the BJD.

== Personal life ==
Baliarsingh holds a Master of Commerce (M.Com) degree from Utkal University (1978). His daughter-in-law, Barsha Singh Bariha, is also a politician and serves as the MLA for the Padampur Assembly constituency.
