= Parsurameswara Temple =

Hindu temple of the god Shiva in Bhubaneswar, India

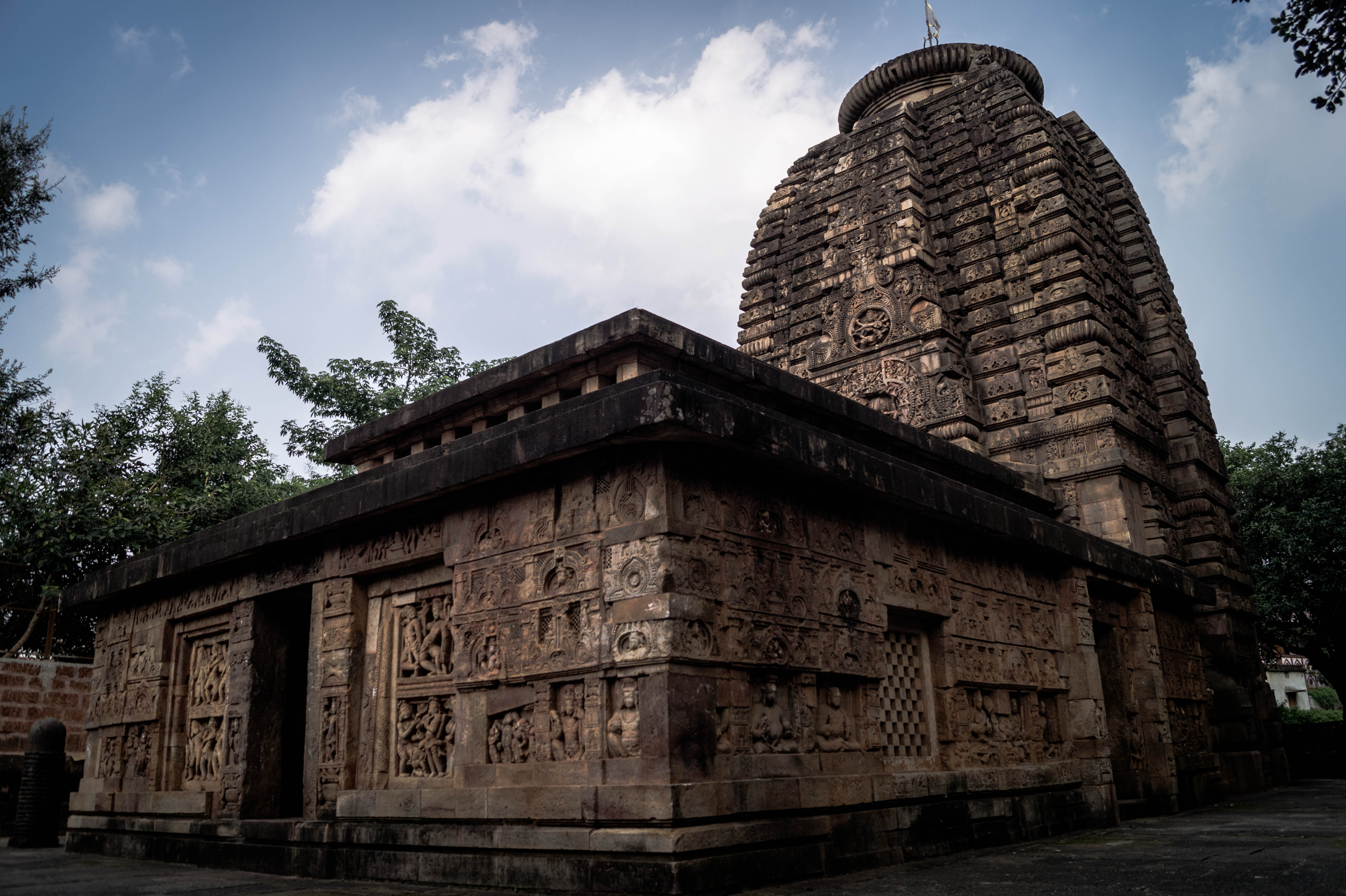
- Image of the temple showing the tower and worship hall in the foreground

- Odisha

Religion
- Affiliation: Hinduism
- Deity: Parsurameswara (Shiva)

Location
- Location: Bhubaneswar
- State: Odisha
- Country: India
- Interactive map of Parsurameswara Temple
- Coordinates: 20°14′35.27″N 85°50′20.57″E

Architecture
- Type: Kalinga Architecture
- Completed: 7th century CE

Parsurameswara Temple (IAST: Paraśurāmeśvara) also spelt Parashurameshvara, is a Hindu temple, located in the East Indian city of Bhubaneswar, the capital of Odisha, India, is considered the best preserved specimen of an early Odia Hindu temple dated to the Shailodbhava period between the 7th and 8th centuries CE. The temple is dedicated to the Hindu god Shiva and is one of the oldest existing temples in the state. It is believed to have been built around 650 CE in Nagara style and has all the main features of the pre-10th century Kalinga Architecture style temples. The temple is one among the Parashurameshvara group of temples.

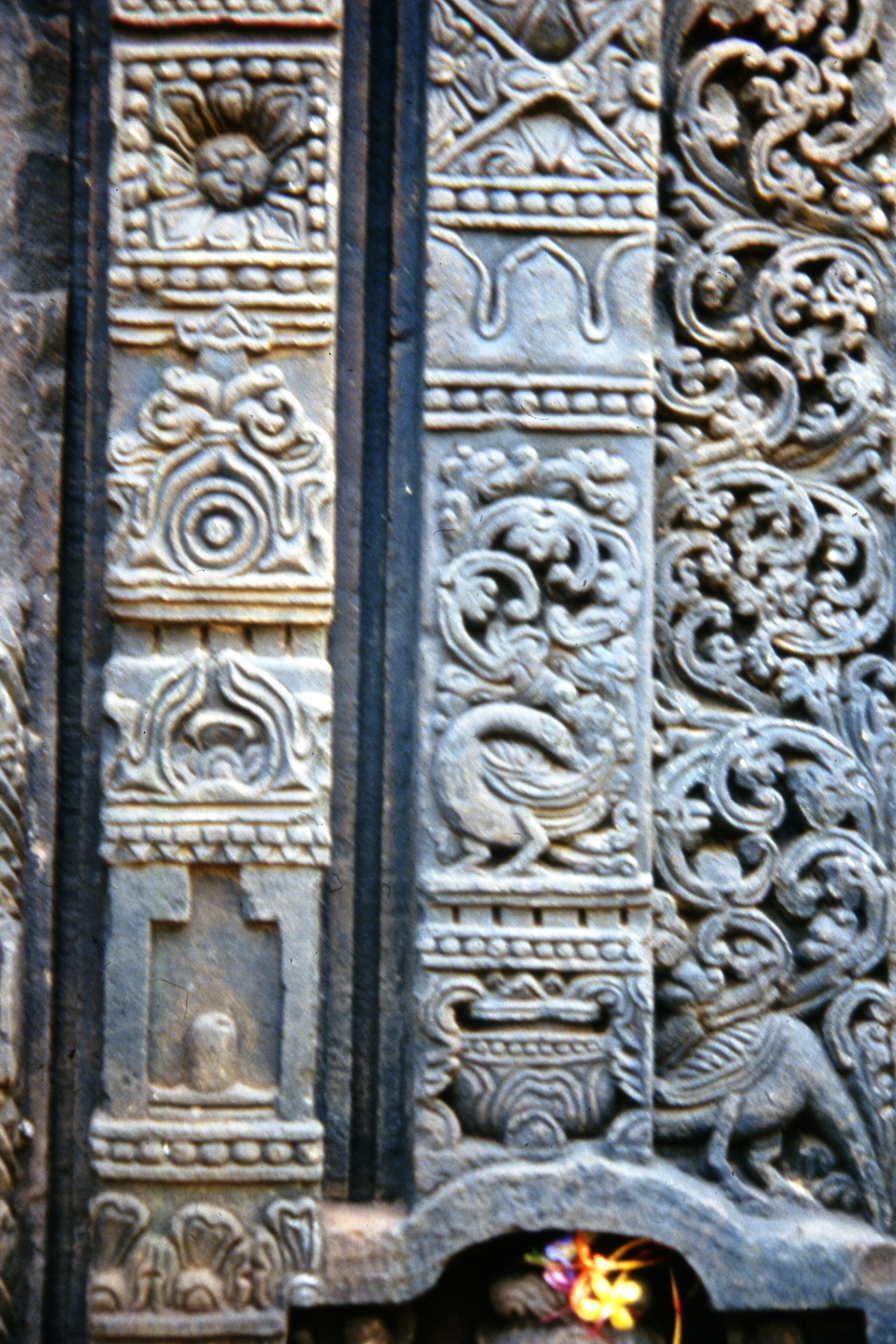
Decorations outside the temple consisting of engravings of divine geese (hamsa) as well as flowers, at the lower part it can be appreciated the symbol of the Purna-Kalasha and on the left the image of a Lingam that represents Shiva.

Parashurameshvara Temple has a vimana, the sanctum, and a bada, the curvilinear spire over its roof, rising to a height of 40.25 ft (12.27 m). It is the first temple to have an additional structure called jagamohana, compared to the earlier temples that had only the vimana. Though the temple is dedicated to Shiva, it contains sculpted images of Shakta deities, which are otherwise normally part of Shakta temples. The temple is the first in Bhubaneswar to contain depictions of Saptamatrikas, namely, Chamunda, Varahi, Indrani, Vaishnavi, Kaumari, Shivani and Brahmi. The temple is maintained and administered by the Archaeological Survey of India (ASI) as a ticketed monument. Parashurashtami is the major festival celebrated in the temple during June–July every year. The temple is one of the most prominent tourist attractions in the state of Odisha.

== History ==
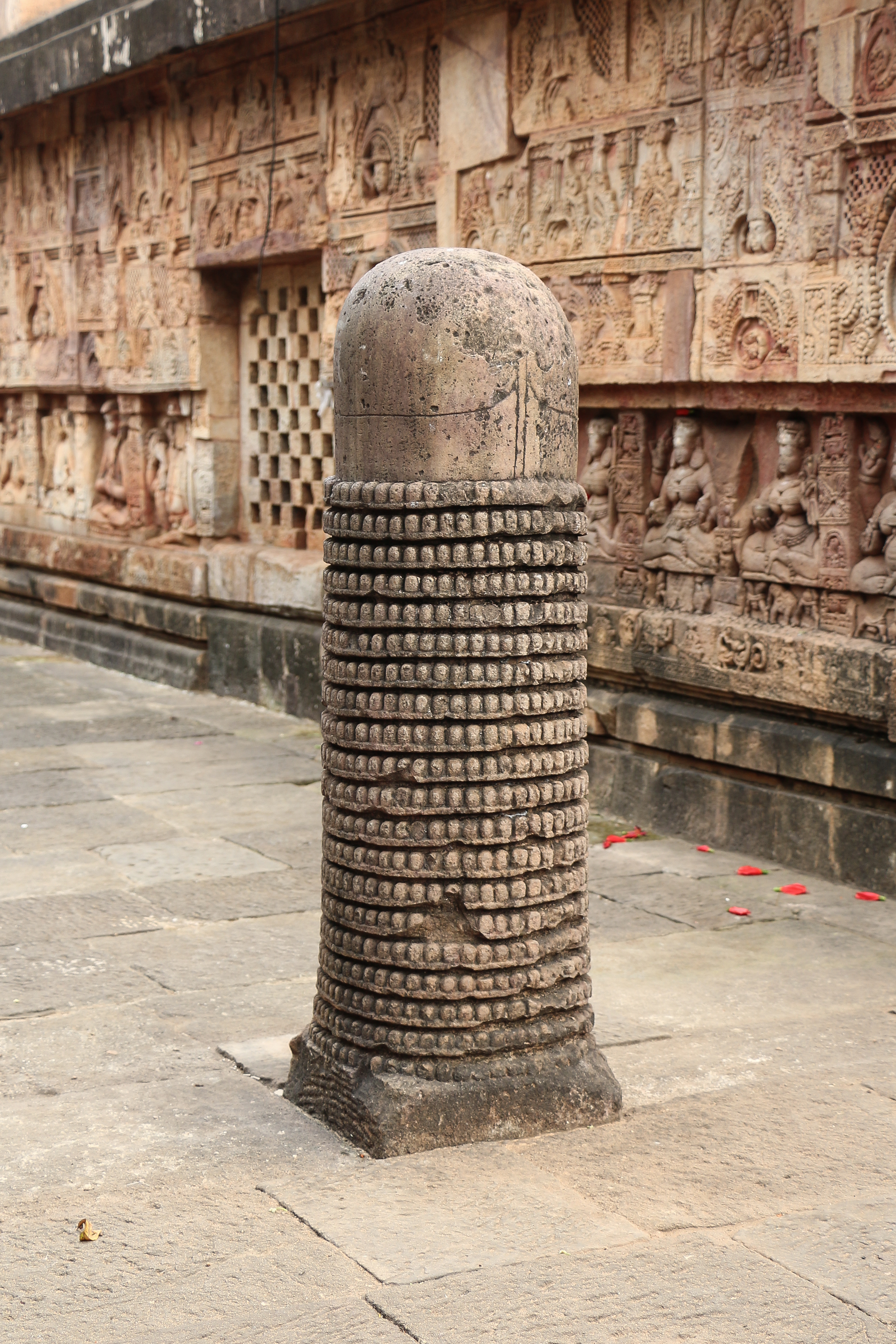
The lingam of the temple

Parashurameshvara Temple is one of the Parashurameshvara group of temples, considered to be the oldest temples in Bhubaneswar. Some historians believe Parashurameshvara Temple to have been built in the early 8th century CE., subsequent to the construction of the Satruguneswar, Bharateswar and Lakshmaneswar temples in the late 7th century, although K.C.Panigrahi places the date as 650 CE. Fergusson believed that the temple might have been initiated at around 500 CE. A mid-7th century date is agreed by most scholars based on style and the presence of the eight planets which appear over the door to the inner sanctum as the later temples portray nine.

Parashurameshvara Temple was built by the Shailodbhavas, who had Shiva as their family deity. The Shailodbhavas also respected the Shakta deities and depicted Shakta images on the walls of the temple. The temple was repaired in 1903, with some changes in the roof of the inner sanctum, whilst retaining most of the original structure. Being located in the eastern coast, Parashurameshvara, like other Odia temples, was not much affected by Muslim invasions of the 12–13th centuries. In modern times, the temple is maintained and administered by the Archaeological Survey of India (ASI) as a ticketed monument.

== Architecture ==
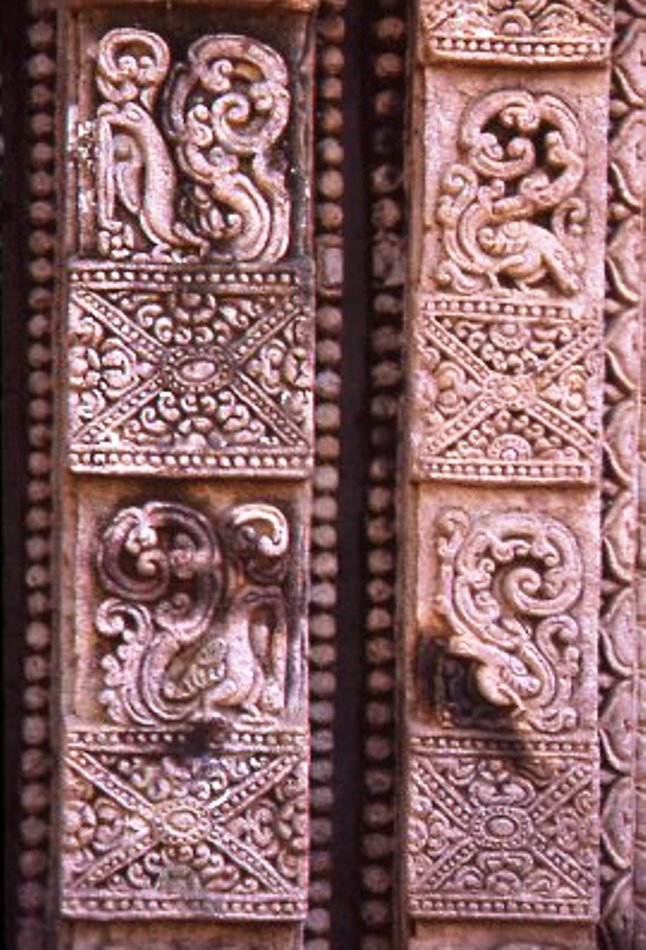
Floral design on one of the walls of the temple

The Kalingan temples have two parts: the sanctum, called vimana, and a place from where pilgrims view the sanctum, called the jagamohana (hall of worshippers). Parashurameshvara Temple is the first to have this additional structure. The initial deul temples were without the jagamohana as seen in some of the older temples in Bhubaneswar, while the later temples had two additional structures namely nata-mandapa (festival hall) and bhoga-mandapa (hall of offerings). The vimana is square in plan and the walls have sections called rathas or pagas. The vimana has a curvilinear tower (called bada) in the form of a pyramid composed of horizontal planes. The sanctum of the temple measures 9.88 × 9.75 ft (3.0 × 3.0 m) from the inside, 19.75 × 21 ft (6.0 × 6.4 m) from the outside and has a height of 40.25 ft (12.3 m). Amalaka, a stone disk with ridges on the rim, is placed over the bada of the temple.

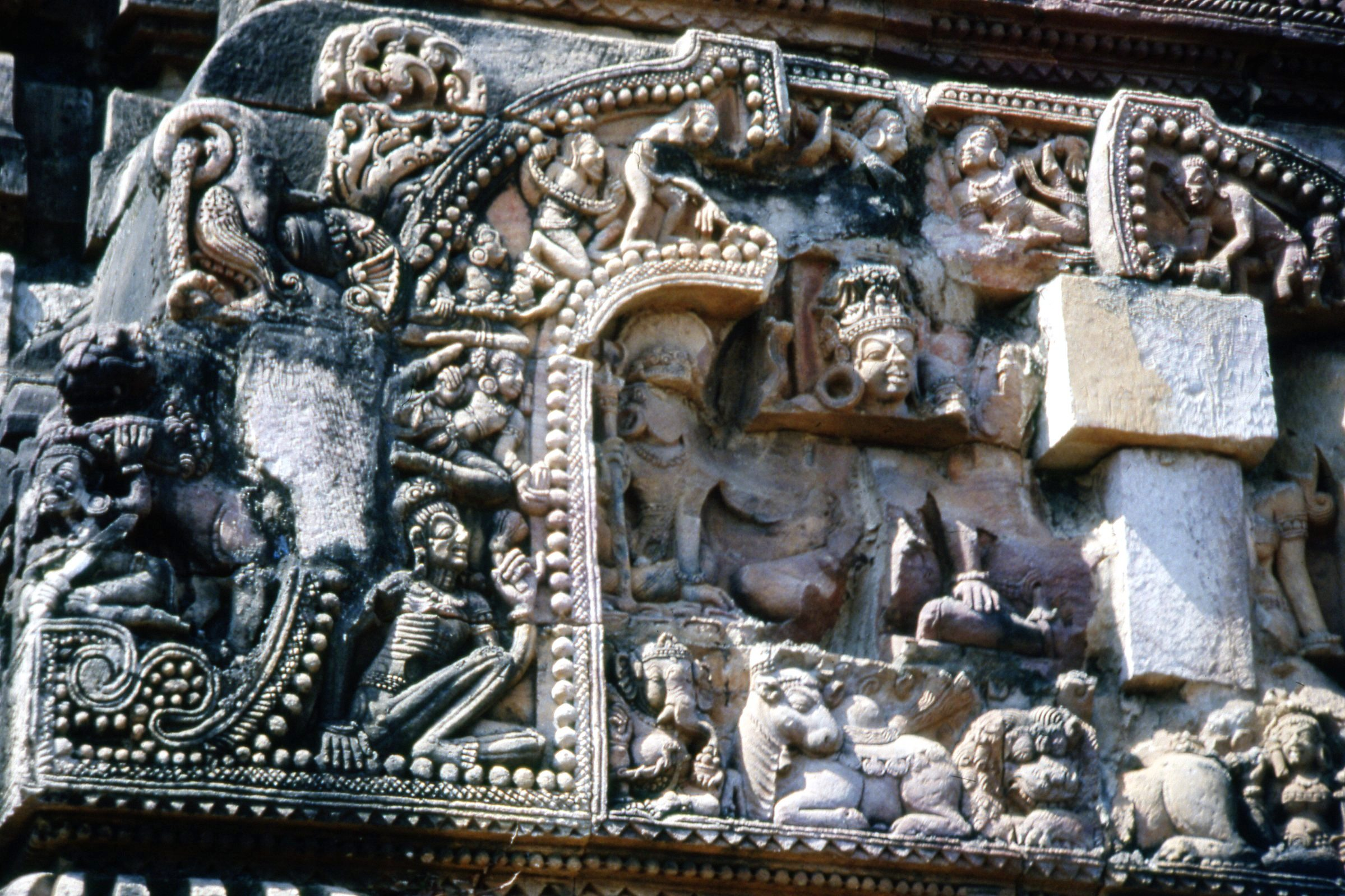
Pediment outside of the temple, which depicts vampires and demons (vetala) as well as several animals.

The jagamohana is rectangular in shape and has a two-element sloping roof with clerestory windows between them. The jagamohana measures 24.94 × 18.33 ft (7.6 × 5.6 m) from the inside and 29.33 × 28.58 ft (8.9 × 8.7 m) from the outside. The latticed windows are classified as pata jali where perforations are square or rectangular in shape. In addition, there are trellised windows with slabs of stone sculptures depicting dancers and musicians. Light enters the interior through doors and the latticed windows. The junction of the vimana and the jagmohana is not cleanly built, leading some scholars to postulate that the porch was added at a much later date; however, the primitive connection is attributed to the building technique. The temple was constructed by burying completed portions in inclined layers of earth up which heavy pieces of stone were dragged.

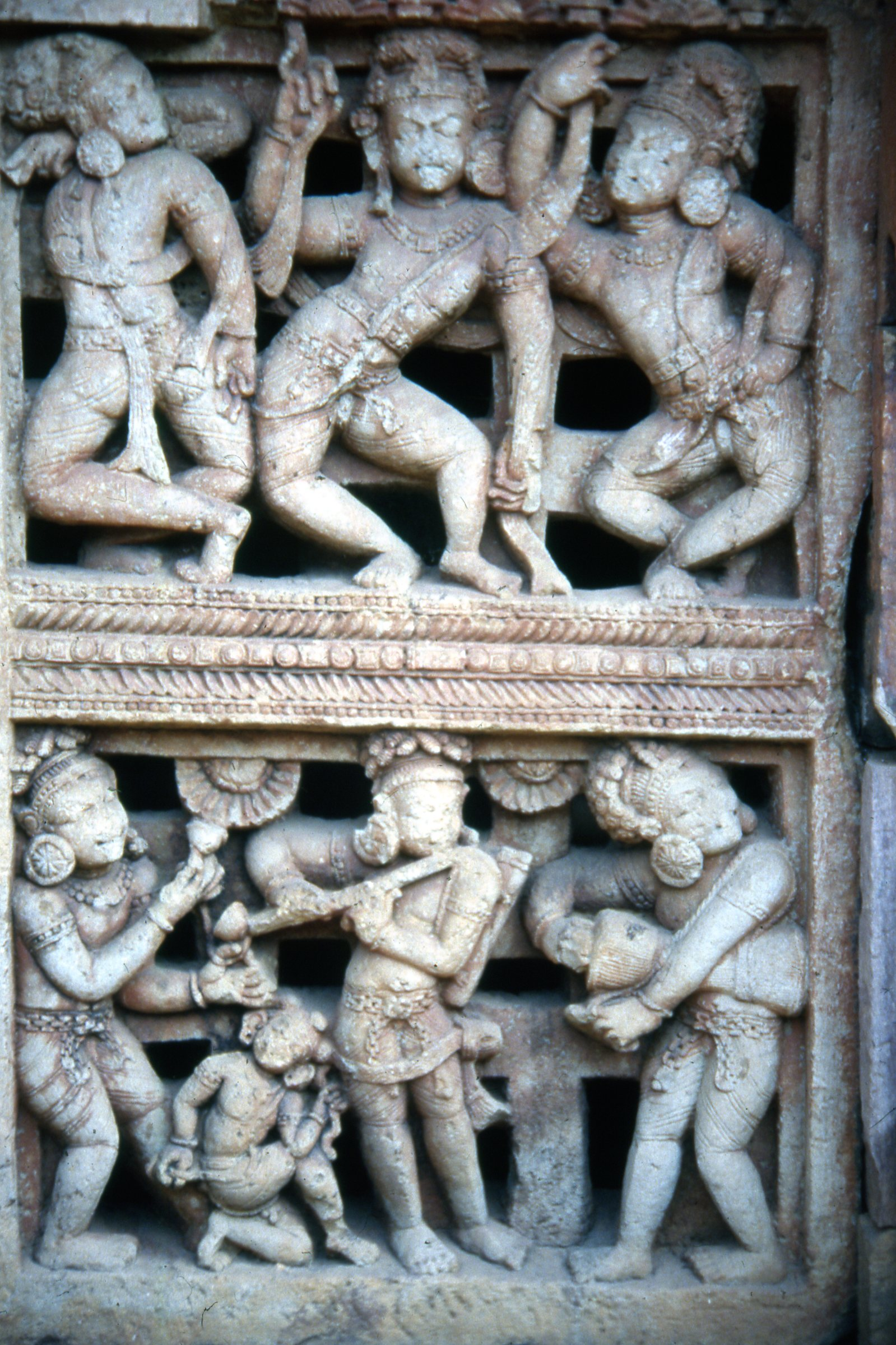
Decorated window on the temple with sculptures of dancers (top) and musicians (below)

The temple is one of the earliest examples of the Nagara style of Hindu temple architecture that emphasises vertical structure, as seen in subsequent temples like Mukteshvara, Lingaraj and Rajarani in Bhubaneswar and the Sun Temple at Konark.

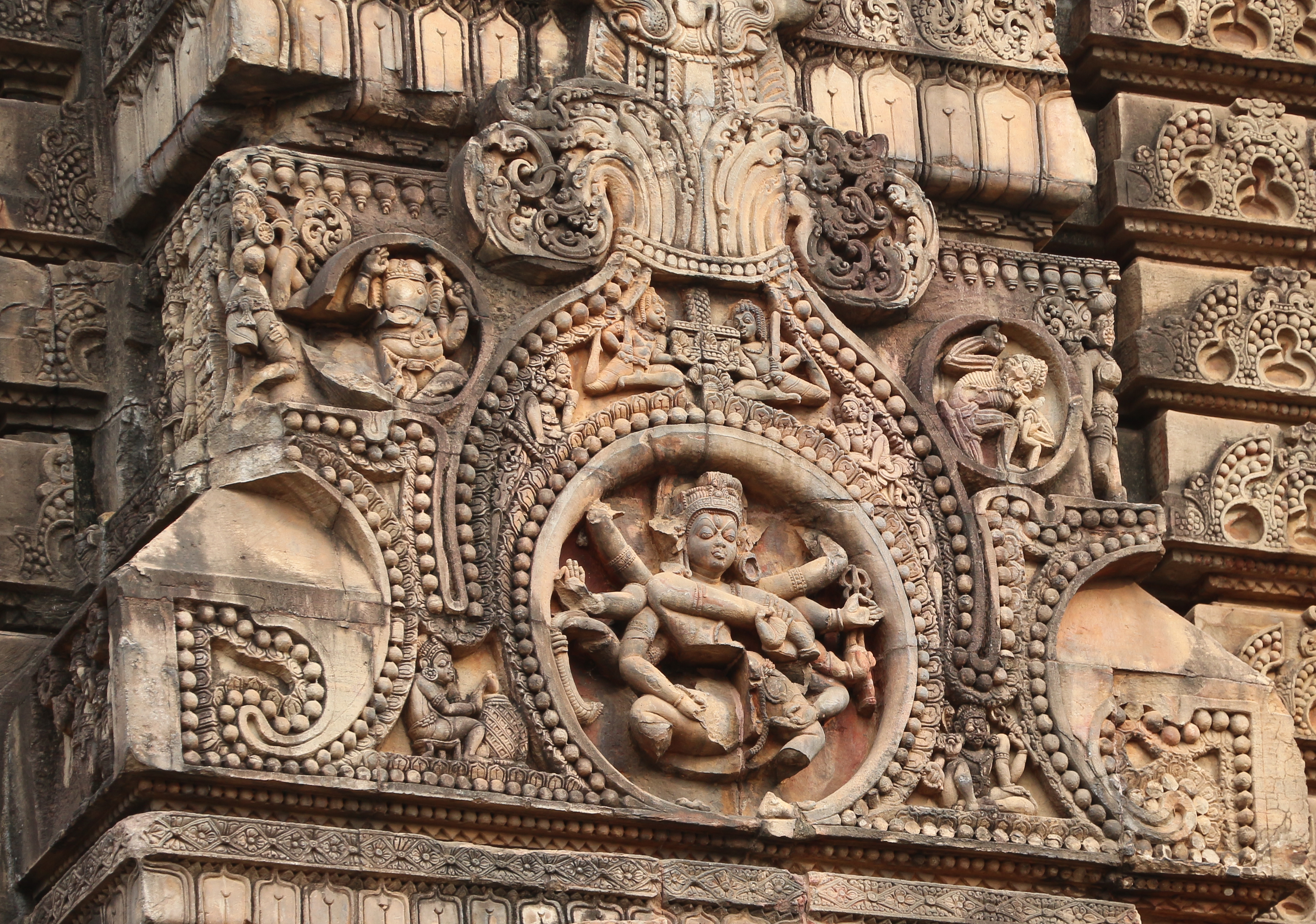
Six armed Nataraja image in a gavaksha on the tower

The temple contains the earliest representation of a six-armed Mahishamardini (Durga) image, shown inside a gavaksha frame from the chest upward with a headdress, karna kundala (ornament), mala (garland) and kankana (anklet). Durga is seen holding a sword in the upper left hand while in the upper right hand, she is seen pressing the face of the demon buffalo. In her left middle hand, she is seen piercing the neck of the demon with a trishula (trident), while in her lower left hand she holds a pointed weapon. In her right middle hand she holds Khetaka while in her lower right hand she holds a bow. A similar image of Durga is found in the Vaital temple, which is a famous Shakta center.

Though the temple is a Shaiva shrine, it contains the images of numerous Shakta deities as Parsvadevatas sculpted on its walls. The temple is the first among Bhubaneswar temples to contain Saptamatrika images, a group of seven goddesses. These images are located in between representations of Ganesha and Virabhadra. Except for Ganesha, all other images are depicted with their respective vahanas (vehicles). An eight-armed dancing Ardhanarishvara, an image of Siva-Parvati and the images of Ganga and Yamuna are also found on the wall of the temple. There are also images of Vishnu, Indra, Surya and Yama in the rectangular niches around the base of the porch. A sculpture of Kartikeya riding on his peacock vehicle is present on the southern wall. Other noteworthy carvings are those of Shiva subduing the demon-king Ravana, who is seen trying to uproot Mount Kailasa, the abode of Shiva. Shiva is sculpted as Nataraja in various tandavas (dance poses) in the temple. As with other Odisha temples, the interiors are not sculpted but left plain. Other carvings on the temple depict a variety of fruits, flowers, birds and animals in scenes and parts of designs. A floral motif trailing from the tail of a bird is common between this temple and the ones in Vaital Deula, while a motif of vase and flowers is common between it and the ones in Mukteshvara Temple.

There are grotesque figures of vetalas (ghosts) on the pilasters of jaga mohan and on the faces of vimana of the temple. The figures of nagas (snake-man) and their female counterparts nagins and other females show many graceful but chaste poses. Pilgrimage is the theme of many of the scenes on the vimana. The other notable descriptive representation on the vimana is the hunting scene above the central niche on the south side, where stags are depicted running away from a hunter. On the outermost frame around the latticed window of the jaganamohana, delightful scenes of monkeys playing all manners of pranks are depicted. The vimana of the temple is a triratha with a distant semblance of a Pancharatha as evident from the projecting niches flanking the central projection. The bada of the vimana abruptly starts from the talapatna or pavement which consists of three elements instead of the usual five and encloses a parallelepiped instead of the usual cubic sanctum.

== Religious significance ==
Parashurameshvara represents Shiva as the lord of Parashurama, one of the avatars of Vishnu. According to Hindu legend, the temple derives its name from the penance of Parashurama and the resultant grace of Shiva. Parashuramashtami is the major festival celebrated in the temple on the 8th day of Ashadha (June–July) when the festival image of Lingaraja is taken to Parashurameshvara Temple and feasted.

Parashurameshvara Temple, along with Rajarani Temple and Vaitala Deula, substantiates the existence of the Devadasi tradition during the 7th and 8th centuries CE. Devadasis were girls dedicated to worship and service of a deity or a temple for the rest of their lives and usually enjoyed a high societal status. They were usually transferred to the king's palace and subsequently performed for the general masses. The temple is considered the best preserved specimen among the various oldest temples in the city.

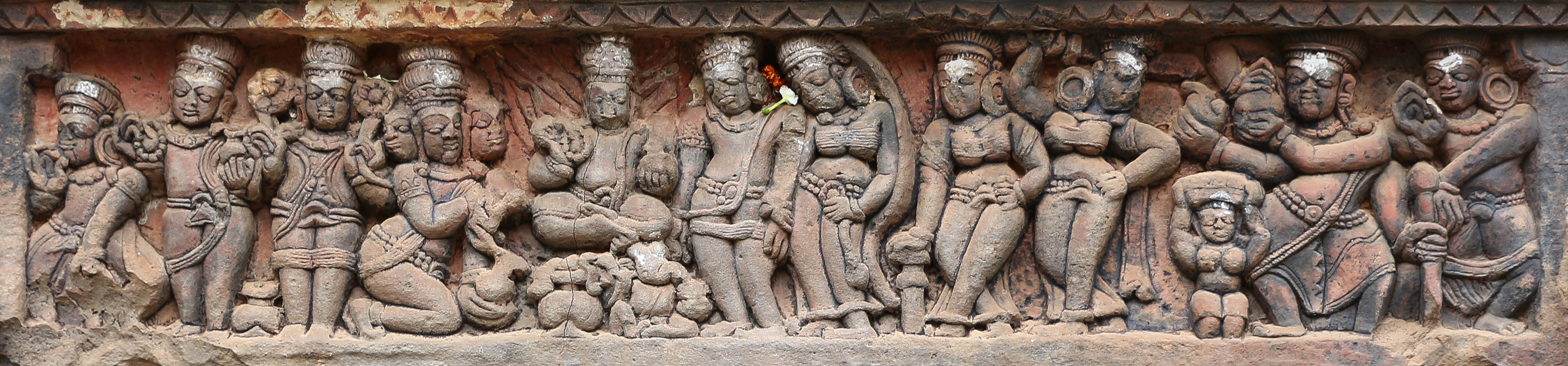
The marriage of Shiva and Parvati.

== See also ==
- List of temples in Bhubaneswar
