= Samata Kranti Dal =

- Chairperson: Braja Kishore Tripathy
- Founded: 13 May 2013; 13 years ago
- Headquarters: Bhubaneshwar
- Ideology: Social democracy
- Colours: Teal
- Seats in Odisha Legislative Assembly: 0 / 147

Samata Kranti Dal (SKD) is a state political party of the Indian state of Odisha led by Braja Kishore Tripathy. It was founded on 13 May 2013. Samata Kranti Dal is allotted 'Scissor' symbol by the Election Commission of India.

Ahead of the 2014 elections the BJP sought to reach a seat-sharing agreement with SKD. Arun Jaitley of BJP held conversations with Tripathy, however no agreement was reached and SKD opted to contest Lok Sabha and Legislative Assembly elections on its own. The party won the lone seat of Biramitrapur in the Odisha Vidhan Sabha Elections 2014.

== See also ==
- Samata Party led by Uday Mandal its president.
