= Brahmagiri Assembly constituency =

Constituency of the Odisha legislative assembly in India

Coordinates: 19.79°N 85.62°E

Brahmagiri
- Constituency No. 108 for the Odisha Legislative Assembly
- Brahmagiri Assembly constituency in Puri district

Constituency details
- Country: India
- Region: East India
- State: Odisha
- Division: Central division
- District: Puri
- Lok Sabha constituency: Puri
- Established: 1951
- Total electors: 2,29,367 (Note: as on 2024) (Note: as data published by election commission)
- Reservation: None

Member of Legislative Assembly
- 17th Odisha Legislative Assembly
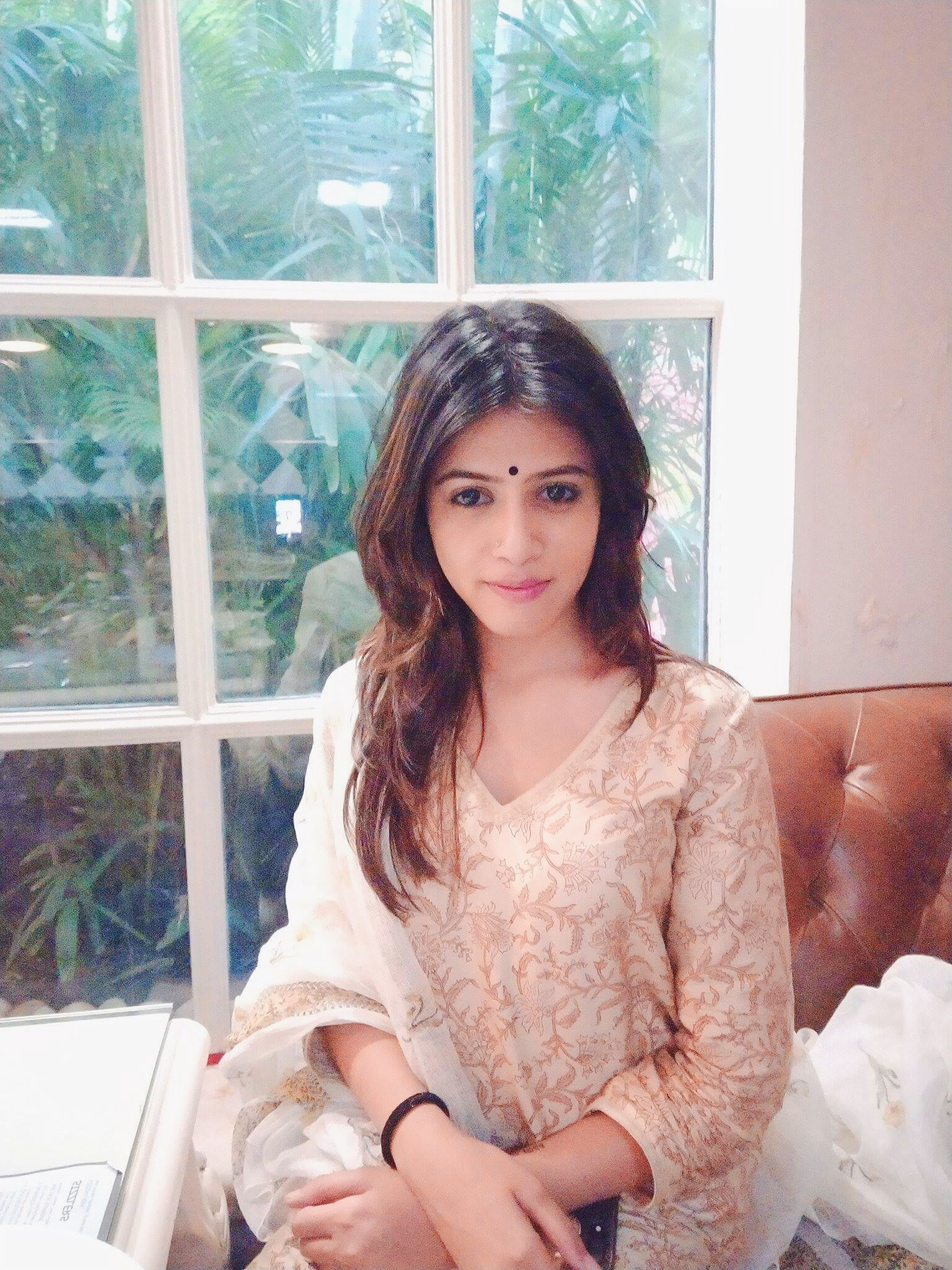
- Incumbent Upasna Mohapatra
- Party: Bharatiya Janata Party
- Elected year: 2024

Brahmagiri is a Vidhan Sabha constituency of Puri district, Odisha, India.

This constituency includes Bramhagiri block, Krushnapraad block and 11 Gram panchayats (Kanheibidyadharpur, Gaudakera, Bijaya Ramachandrapur, Pratapramchandrapur, Biranarasinghapur, Birabalabhadrapur, Pratappurusottampur, Hantuka, Basudevpur, Kerandipur and Bhailipur) of Puri sadar block.

== Elected members ==
Vote share of winning candidates
2024	51.53%
2019	49.41%
2014	48.67%
2009	48.57%
2004	50.01%
2000	57.77%
1995	37.76%
1990	54.15%
1985	46.78%
1980	36.90%
1977	41.64%

Since its formation in 1951, 17 elections were held till date.

List of members elected from Brahmagiri constituency are:

Year	Member	Party
2024	Upasna Mohapatra	Bharatiya Janata Party
2019	Lalitendu Bidyadhar Mohapatra	Bharatiya Janata Party
2014	Sanjay Kumar Das Burma	Biju Janata Dal
2009	Sanjay Kumar Das Burma	Biju Janata Dal
2004	Lalatendu Bidyadhar Mohapatra	Indian National Congress
2000	Lalatendu Bidyadhar Mohapatra	Indian National Congress
1995	Lalatendu Bidyadhar Mohapatra	Indian National Congress
1990	Ajaya Kumar Jena	Janata Dal
1985	Gangadhar Mohapatra	Indian National Congress
1980	Gangadhar Mohapatra	Indian National Congress (I)
1977	Ajaya Kumar Jena	Janata Party
1974	Sidheswar Panigrahi	Communist Party of India
1971	Gopabandhu Patra	Indian National Congress (R)
1967	Brajamohan Mohanty	Indian National Congress
1961	Gopabandhu Patra	Indian National Congress
1957	Padma Charan Samantasinghar	Indian National Congress
1951	Biswanath Parida	Independent politician

== Election results ==
=== 2024 ===
Voting were held on 25 May 2024 in 3rd phase of Odisha Assembly Election & 6th phase of Indian General Election. Counting of votes was on 4 June 2024. In 2024 election, Bharatiya Janata Party candidate Upasna Mohapatra defeated Biju Janata Dal candidate Umakanta Samantaray by a margin of 9,830 votes.

2024 Odisha Vidhan Sabha Election, Brahmagiri
Party	Candidate	Votes	%	±%
BJP	Upasna Mohapatra	95,783	51.53	
BJD	Umakanta Samantaray	85,953	46.25	
INC	Mitrabhanu Mohapatra	1,910	1.03	
NOTA	None of the above	395	0.21	
Majority		9,830	5.28	
Turnout		1,85,862	81.03	
BJP hold				

=== 2019 ===
In 2019 election, Bharatiya Janata Party candidate Lalitendu Bidyadhar Mohapatra defeated Biju Janata Dal candidate Sanjay Kumar Das Burma by a margin of 2,130 votes.

2019 Vidhan Sabha Election, Brahmagiri
Party	Candidate	Votes	%	±%
BJP	Lalitendu Bidyadhar Mohapatra	88,256	49.41	
BJD	Sanjay Kumar Das Burma	86,126	48.22	
INC	Umakanta Baral	2,504	1.40	
NOTA	None of the above	760	0.43	
Majority		2,130	1.19	
Turnout		1,78,626	81.52	
BJP gain from BJD				

=== 2014 ===
In 2014 election, Biju Janata Dal candidate Sanjay Kumar Das Burma defeated Indian National Congress candidate Lalatendu Bidyadhar Mohapatra by a margin of 1,341 votes.

2014 Vidhan Sabha Election, Brahmagiri
Party	Candidate	Votes	%	±%
BJD	Sanjay Kumar Das Burma	78,675	48.67	▲0.1
INC	Lalatendu Bidyadhar Mohapatra	77,334	47.84	▲2.64
BJP	Debendranath Tarei	3,277	2.03	▼2.36
NOTA	None of the above	546	0.34	−
Majority		1,341	0.82	−
Turnout		1,61,643	83.31	▲4.7
Registered electors		1,94,024		
BJD hold				

=== 2009 ===
In 2009 election, Biju Janata Dal candidate Sanjay Kumar Das Burma defeated Indian National Congress candidate Lalatendu Bidyadhar Mohapatra by a margin of 4,886 votes.

2009 Vidhan Sabha Election, Brahmagiri
Party	Candidate	Votes	%	±%
BJD	Sanjay Kumar Das Burma	70,533	48.57	▲2.3
INC	Lalatendu Bidyadhar Mohapatra	65,647	45.20	▼7.51
BJP	Amrut Kumar Jena	6,382	4.39	−
Majority		4,886	3.36 (Note: %of total valid votes)	−
Turnout		1,45,338	78.61	
BJD gain from INC				
