= Sunil Kumar Mohanty =

Indian politician

Member of the Odisha Legislative Assembly
- Incumbent
- Assumed office 4 June 2024
- Preceded by: Jayanta Kumar Sarangi
- Constituency: Puri

Personal details
- Political party: Biju Janata Dal
- Profession: Politician

Sunil Kumar Mohanty is an Indian politician from Odisha. He is a Member of the Odisha Legislative Assembly from 2024, representing Puri Assembly constituency as a Member of the Biju Janata Dal.

== See also ==
- 2024 Odisha Legislative Assembly election
- Odisha Legislative Assembly
