= Pinaki Misra =

Indian politician (born 1959)

Member of Parliament, Lok Sabha
- In office (1996–1998) (2009-2024)
- Preceded by: Braja Kishore Tripathy
- Succeeded by: Sambit Patra
- Constituency: Puri, Odisha

Personal details
- Born: 23 October 1959 (age 66) Cuttack, Odisha, India
- Party: Biju Janata Dal
- Other political affiliations: Indian National Congress
- Spouses: Sangita Misra (m. 1984, divorced); Mahua Moitra (m. 2025)
- Children: 2
- Education: Faculty of Law, University of Delhi
- Occupation: Politician
- Profession: Lawyer

Pinaki Misra (born 23 October 1959) is an Indian politician from the Biju Janata Dal party who served as a Member of Parliament in the Lok Sabha representing the Puri constituency. In 1996, he contested the Puri Lok Sabha seat as a Congress candidate and won against Braja Kishore Tripathy, who was then the sitting MP and Union Minister from Puri. He is a Senior Advocate in the Supreme Court of India and has argued cases in nearly all High Courts and major tribunals across India.

== Early life and education ==
Pinaki Misra was born in Cuttack, Odisha. His father, Lokanath Misra, was a member of the Rajya Sabha and the Governor of Assam.

Misra studied at St. Xavier's School, Delhi. He holds a B.A. (Hons.) degree in History from St. Stephen's College, Delhi, and an LL.B. degree from the Faculty of Law, University of Delhi.

== Personal life ==
In January 1984, Misra married Sangita Misra, but they later got divorced, and they had two children together. In May 2025, he married Mahua Moitra, a Trinamool Congress member of parliament from West Bengal, India.

== Political career ==
His positions are chronologically listed as follows.

Tenure	Position Held
1996	Elected to 11th Lok Sabha
1996–97	Member, Standing Committee on External Affairs
2009	Re-elected to 15th Lok Sabha (2nd term)
31 August 2009 – 2011	Member, Standing Committee on External Affairs
23 September 2009	Member, Committee on Subordinate Legislation
2009 – May 2014	Member, Standing Committee on Civil Aviation
2009 – May 2014	Member, Consultative Committee, Ministry of Law & Justice
2011 – May 2014	Member, Standing Committee on Personnel, Public Grievances, Law and Justice
May 2014	Re-elected to 16th Lok Sabha (3rd term)
1 September 2014 – 25 May 2019	Chairperson, Standing Committee on Urban Development Member, Consultative Committee, Ministry of Defence
29 January 2015 – 25 May 2019	Member, General Purposes Committee
May 2019	Re-elected to 17th Lok Sabha (4th term)
20 June 2019 onwards	Member, Business Advisory Committee
13 September 2019 onwards	Member, Standing Committee on Finance
9 October 2019 onwards	Member, Committee on Subordinate Legislation
15 October 2019 onwards	Leader, Biju Janata Dal Legislature Party in Lok Sabha
21 November 2019 onwards	Member, General Purposes Committee, Lok Sabha Member, Consultative Committee, Ministry of Electronics and Information & Technology, Ministry of Communications

== See also ==
- Indian general election, 2019 (Odisha)
- Indian general election, 2014 (Odisha)
- Indian general election, 2009 (Odisha)
