= Lalatendu Bidyadhar Mohapatra =

Indian politician (born 1964)

Member of the Odisha Legislative Assembly
- In office 1995–2009
- Preceded by: Ajay Kumar Jena
- Succeeded by: Sanjay Kumar Das Burma
- Constituency: Brahmagiri

Personal details
- Born: 14 February 1964
- Died: 6 November 2016 (aged 52)
- Party: Indian National Congress
- Children: Upasna Mohapatra (daughter)
- Relatives: Lalitendu Bidyadhar Mohapatra (brother)
- Education: BJB College
- Profession: Politician

Lalatendu Bidyadhar Mohapatra was a politician from Odisha, India. He was elected to the Odisha Legislative Assembly from Brahmagiri Assembly constituency in the years 1995, 2000 and 2004.

He completed his graduation in history and political science from BJB College. He held the position of vice-president of Orissa Pradesh Congress Committee (OPCC) from 2004 to 2009.

Lalatendu Bidyadhar Mohapatra died on 6 November 2016 due to brain stroke and multiple organ failure.
