= Braja Kishore Tripathy =

Indian politician

Member of Parliament, Lok Sabha
- In office (1991–1996), (1998-1999), (1999-2004), (2004 – 2009)
- Preceded by: Nilamani Routray
- Succeeded by: Pinaki Misra
- Constituency: Puri

Personal details
- Born: 25 September 1947 (age 78) Puri, Orissa, India
- Party: Samata Kranti Dal
- Children: 2 Sons And 1 Daughter
- As of 22 September, 2006

Braja Kishore Tripathy (born 25 September 1947) is an Indian politician who served as the member of the 14th Lok Sabha of India. He represented the Puri Lok Sabha Constituency of Orissa as a member of the Biju Janata Dal (BJD). He was a Cabinet Minister in NDA government in 13th Lok Sabha. He joined the Bharatiya Janata Party after resigning from BJD in 2009 and unsuccessfully contested the elections from the Puri Lok Sabha Constituency.

On 13 May 2013, he floated a new political party in Odisha and has named it the Samata Kranti Dal. Tribal Leader from Odisha George Tirkey, MLA Biramitrapur has been appointed the President of the Samata Kranti Dal. Socialist leader and journalist Rabi Rath is the vice president of the party.
