= Lalitendu Bidyadhar Mohapatra =

Indian politician

Member of the Odisha Legislative Assembly
- In office 2019–2024
- Preceded by: Sanjay Kumar Das Burma
- Succeeded by: Upasna Mohapatra
- Constituency: Brahmagiri

Personal details
- Party: Bharatiya Janata Party
- Relatives: Lalatendu Bidyadhar Mohapatra (brother); Upasna Mohapatra (niece)
- Profession: Politician

Lalitendu Bidyadhar Mohapatra is a former Member of the Legislative Assembly from the Brahmagiri Assembly constituency. He was elected in the 2019 Odisha Legislative Assembly election as a candidate of the Bharatiya Janata Party.
