= Sanjay Kumar Das Burma =

Indian politician

Sanjay Kumar DasBurma
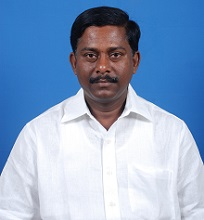
- Sanjay Kumar DasBurma

Member of the Odisha Legislative Assembly
- In office 2009–2019
- Preceded by: Lalatendu Bidyadhar Mohapatra
- Succeeded by: Lalitendu Bidyadhar Mohapatra
- Constituency: Brahmagiri

Personal details
- Born: 6 July 1966 (age 60) Malud, Krishnaprasad, Puri, Odisha
- Party: Biju Janata Dal
- Spouse: Sailabala DasBurma
- Children: Achin Dasburma, Dipali Dasburma
- Profession: Social Service, Politician

Sanjay Kumar Das Burma (Odia: ସଞ୍ଜୟ କୁମାର ଦାସ ବର୍ମା; born on 6 July 1966) is a politician from Odisha, India. He was the Minister of State(Ind), Food Supplies and Consumer Welfare and Minister of State(Ind), Employment & Technical Education & Training in Odisha Legislative Assembly. He is a two time MLA representing Brahmagiri constituency from the Biju Janata Dal party. He is the executive editor of Odia Magazine "SISIRA".

== Personal background ==
Sanjay Kumar DasBurma is the son of Late Rama Krishna Das, born in Malud, Krishnaprasad, Puri. He is married to Sailabala DasBurma. The couple have a son named Achin Dasburma and a daughter Dipali Dasburma.

== Political career ==
He was first elected as a MLA in 2009 from Brahmagiri Vidhan Sabha constituency in the 14th Odisha legislative assembly defeating veteran INC leader Late Lalatendu Bidyadhar Mohapatra.

Sl_No	Constituency	party	Period
1	BRAHMAGIRI	Biju Janata Dal	14th:(2009-2014)
2	BRAHMAGIRI	Biju Janata Dal	15th:(2014-2019)

He is a minister of state (Independent Charge) with two portfolios in the ongoing 15th Odisha legislative assembly.

Sl_No	Post Held	From_Date	To_Date
1	Minister of State (India), Food Supplies and Consumer Welfare	21/05/2014	05/05/2017
2	Minister of State (India), Employment & Technical Education & Training	21/05/2014	05/05/2017

He has also served as the secretary, convener, vice president of BJD and the president of Biju Yuva Janata dal (BYJD), the youth wing of the party.

== See also ==
- Parikud
