= Umakanta Samantaray =

Indian politician

Member of Odisha Legislative Assembly
- In office 2014–2024
- Preceded by: Prasad Kumar Harichandan
- Constituency: Satyabadi

Personal details
- Political party: Biju Janata Dal
- Profession: Politician

Umakanta Samantaray is an Indian politician from Odisha. He was a two time elected Member of the Odisha Legislative Assembly from 2014 as an Independent candidate, representing Satyabadi Assembly constituency and from 2019 as a Member of the Biju Janata Dal.

== See also ==
- 2019 Odisha Legislative Assembly election
- Odisha Legislative Assembly
