= Banapur =

- Town
- Location in Odisha, India Banapur (India)
- Coordinates: 19.78°N 85.18°E
- Country: India
- State: Odisha
- District: Khordha
- Elevation: 1 m (3.3 ft)

Population (2001)
  - Total: 16,437

Languages
  - Official: Odia
- Time zone: UTC+5:30 (IST)
- PIN: 752031
- Vehicle registration: OD 33 & OD 02
- Website: www.odisha.gov.in

Banapur is a town and a Notified Area Council in Khordha district in the state of Odisha, India. The town is named after the King Banasura of Lord Shri Krishna era (as the epic tells).

Banasura, a demon-king who is said to have ruled over this place. Major point of attraction here is the temple dedicated to Goddess Bhagabati (odisha Hindu goddess), the presiding deity of Banapur. It is one of the famous Shaktipithas of Odisha.

The place was under the control of a line of feudal lords, the ancestors of the Rajas (Kings) of Parikud, till 18th century. As per historical importance it was one of the centers of inception of Paika rebellion.

== Geography ==
Banapur is located at 19.78°N 85.18°E. It has an average elevation of 1 metres (3 feet).

== Demographics ==
As of 2001 India census, Banapur had a population of 25,652. Males constitute 51% of the population and females 49%. Banapur has an average literacy rate of 69%, higher than the national average of 59.5%; with 56% of the males and 44% of females literate. 13% of the population is under 6 years of age.

== Climate ==
Banapur experiences sub tropical climate due to its proximity to east coast that makes it suitable for growing agriculture crops.

== Art and culture ==
The town is enriched with cultural heritage and is famous for its unique cane made art-crafts such as sofa set, hanging chair, TV stand etc. & a delicious sweet named Mathapuli. The ancient Daksheswar or Dakshya Prajapati Temple situated at the entrance of town features fine specimens of Odia architecture and sculpture. As in Odia proverb bara masa tera parba 13 festival in 12 months. Among all the festivals the most famous one is Panchudola-the 5th day after holi/dola purnima, where one can find the gathering of 72 god and goddesses in a large ground. This festival is carried out for 2–3 days.

Banapur has a great history of its Religion, Art and Culture.

=== Nehru Seva Sangh ===
The Nehru Seva Sangh came into existence in 1946 by Swami Harihar Ram, when India was on the threshold of independence. It is situated at Banapur on the banks of Chilika lake, about 100 km south of Bhubaneshwar, the state capital of Odisha. The Sangh has many activities like- orphanages, schools and training centers for the blind, deaf and for women, welfare of scheduled castes and hostels for Scheduled Tribes etc. It has schools for both blind and deaf as well as general students. Industrial training center for women on tailoring, cane, willow and stenography.

Panchudola festival

Panchu Dola festival is seen in Orissa and is related with Dola Purnima and Holi celebration saw here. It is watched five days after Dola Purnima. On the day Gods and Goddess from sanctuaries in a zone are conveyed to an open ground(Paltan Padia) in the town in brilliant processions. The assemblage of divinities from a few sanctuaries draws in a large number of aficionados.

The festival is a noteworthy occasion in country parts of Eastern India and is otherwise called Dasa Dola. The put where the divinities amass transforms into a mela ground. Playing of Holi with hues and fireworks around evening time are a portion of the essential exercises on the day. The gathering of the different gods from various sanctuaries is joined by different ceremonies.

== Education ==
More than 80% of the town population are educated (male-55% and female-45%). There are more than 15 primary schools and 10 high schools in the town. Some of the best high schools are as follows-

- Boys' High School(govt), Banapur(NAC).
- Godavarish Vidyapitha(govt), Banapur.
- N.G.P Upendra Vidyapitha, Narendrapur.
- Sri Aurobindo School Of Integral Education Matrunilaya, Banapur
- Balugaon High School(govt), Balugaon(NAC).
- Padma Charan High School, Alaidiha, Banapur.
- Panchupalli Somanath High School, Brahmankushadiha.
- Girls' High School (govt), Banapur(NAC).
- Banambar Academy (semi govt), Bhimpur.
- Saraswati Sisumandir, Bhagabati Vihar, Bisarpatana, Banapur(NAC)
- Nilakantheswar Vidyapitha, Kumaranga Sasan, Banapur(NAC)
- Gayatri Vidya Mandir, Bhimpur, Banapur.
- Salia Vidya Niketan, Pratap, Banapur
- Ladukeswar bidya mandir, Banapur
- PatitaPaban Bani Mandir, Gambharimunda
- Nachuni Godavarish High School. Nachuni.
- St Xavier's high school, Banapur
- Chilika Rani English Medium School (Cbse), Balugaon

There is also the scope of higher education in general studies like Bachelors in Humanities as well as in Science and only Intermediate in Commerce.

The town has more than four colleges and they are:

- Godavarish Mahavidyalaya, Banapur
- Nachuni Mahavidyalaya, Nachuni
- Balugaon college, Balugaon.
- Parshuram Mahavidyalaya, Gambharimunda
- Panchupalli Bhima Balabantaray College, Solari
- Rural Women's college, Banapur
- Kalijai Residential College,Balugaon

== Health and community centre ==
There is a govt hospital for general public. 1- CHC, Banapur, 2- PHC, Nachuni 3- CHC, Gambharimunda 4- 3 other Govt. Health centers

== Notable people ==
- Godabarish Mishra - freedom fighter, writer, teacher., Founder of Godavarish Vidyapitha & Godavarish Mahavidyalaya
- Dipak Misra - Former Chief Justice of India, nephew of Justice Ranganath Misra
- Lokanath Misra - Former governor of Assam(1991–1997)
- Ranganath Misra - Former CJI, son of Godavaris Mishra
- Manasi Pradhan - women activist and Recipient of 2013 Rani Laxmibai Stree Shakti Puraskar
- Baidyanath Ram - journalist

Famous for the time honoured temple of Goddess Bhagabati, Banapur has earned celebrity as a center of religious activities. Once it was the capital of Sailodvaba dynasty, responsible for the construction of the early group of temples in Bhubaneswar. The large number of Buddhist images discovered at Banapur relate the place to the Vajrayan cult of Buddhism. The temple of "Dakshya Prajapati" is a fine specimen of 12th century extraordinary artistic excellence of Odishan art. Banapur is also famous for its cane products. It plays one of the most important role in Odia history.

It was an important centre of Shaivism, Shaktism and Buddhism. Lord Jagannath was housed in Bankada gada fort at Banapur for 30 years. The town is in scenic and sublime surroundings. It is surrounded from 3 types by huge hills led by GHANTASILA and chilika on the 4th side.

Chilika, the largest brackish water lake in Asia covering an area of over 1,100 square kilometres (420 mi^{2}) is a great attraction for the tourists for fishing, bird watching and boating. In winter, Chilika attracts thousands of indigenous and migratory birds. This is also place of attraction for the endearing species Irrawaddy dolphin.
