= Upasna Mohapatra =

Indian politician (born 1997)

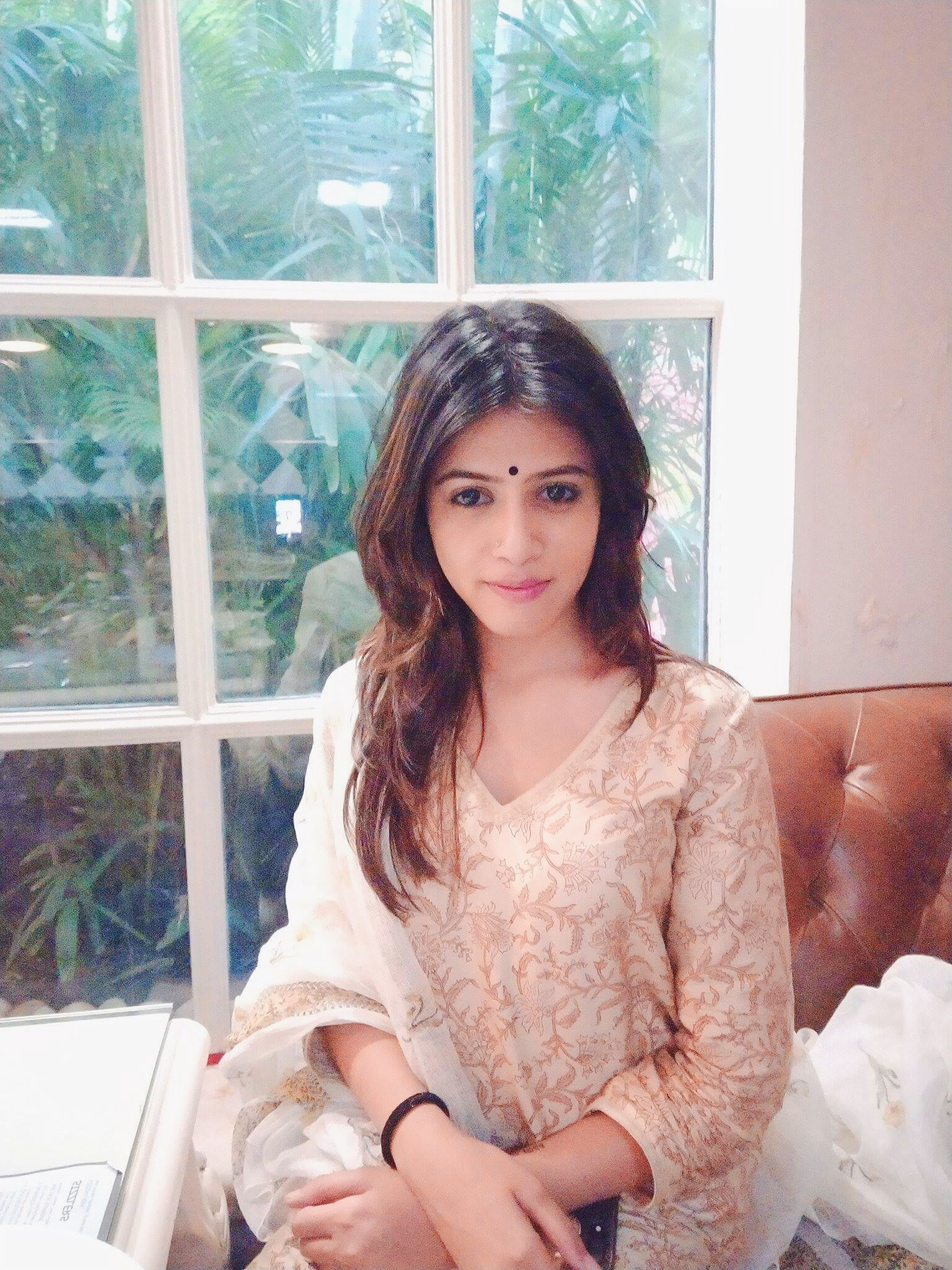
- Mohapatra in 2017

Member of the Odisha Legislative Assembly
- Incumbent
- Assumed office 2024
- Preceded by: Lalitendu Bidyadhar Mohapatra
- Constituency: Brahmagiri

Personal details
- Born: 20 June 1997 (age 29) Brahmagiri, Puri, Odisha, India
- Parent: Lalatendu Bidyadhar Mohapatra (father)
- Relatives: Lalitendu Bidyadhar Mohapatra (uncle)
- Education: KIIT International School, Sophia College for Women

Upasna Mohapatra (born 1997) is a politician from Odisha in India representing the Bharatiya Janata Party. She entered politics following the death of her father, Lalatendu Bidyadhar Mohapatra, a former MLA of the Brahmagiri Assembly constituency. In the 2024 Odisha Legislative Assembly election, she was elected as the MLA from the Brahmagiri constituency and became the youngest MLA in Odisha assembly.

== Biography ==
Hailing from Brahmagiri, Odisha, Mohapatra is the great granddaughter of Bakshi Jagabandhu Bidyadhar who pioneered the Paika rebellion in East India which happens to be the very first rebellion against the British empire (1817), much before the Sepoy mutiny (1857). Her political career has been passed on to her from her late father Lalatendu Bidyadhar Mohapatra who was a leader of Odisha Congress. She studied in two private schools of Bhubaneswar and Cuttack and pursued higher studies in Sophia College, Mumbai from 2015.

In June 2019, shortly after the announcement of the election results, Upasna got engaged to Mumbai-based businessman Subhransu Sekhar Biswal in a formal ceremony in Bhubaneswar.

Subhransu and Upasna tied the knot on 17 February 2021 in an intimate ceremony surrounded by friends and family.

== Political career ==
Although Mohapatra had not confirmed her political career until October 2017 she had been in the limelight after being active in the 2014 general elections and raising her voice in several political and social matters. She has been prominent in the regional media. On 14 October 2017, she joined the BJP under the leadership of Dharmendra Pradhan. She was appointed the state coordinator of BJP in August 2018 and state convener of the 'I support Modi campaign'.

She spearheaded the Brahmagiri assembly campaign for her uncle Lalitendu Bidyadhar Mohapatra in the 2019 Assembly elections where he took the seat of Brahmagiri and is the current MLA of Brahmagiri Assembly segment.

On 16 March 2021 Mohapatra along with around 20 people allegedly roughed up tenants of a house in Nayapalli, Bhubaneswar. Mohapatra was booked for assaulting the tenant and 17 people were arrested over the incident. Later in 2022, the Odisha High Court quashed the criminal proceedings against her.
