= Olash =

Village in Odisha, India

Coordinates: 20.052454°N 86.323056°E

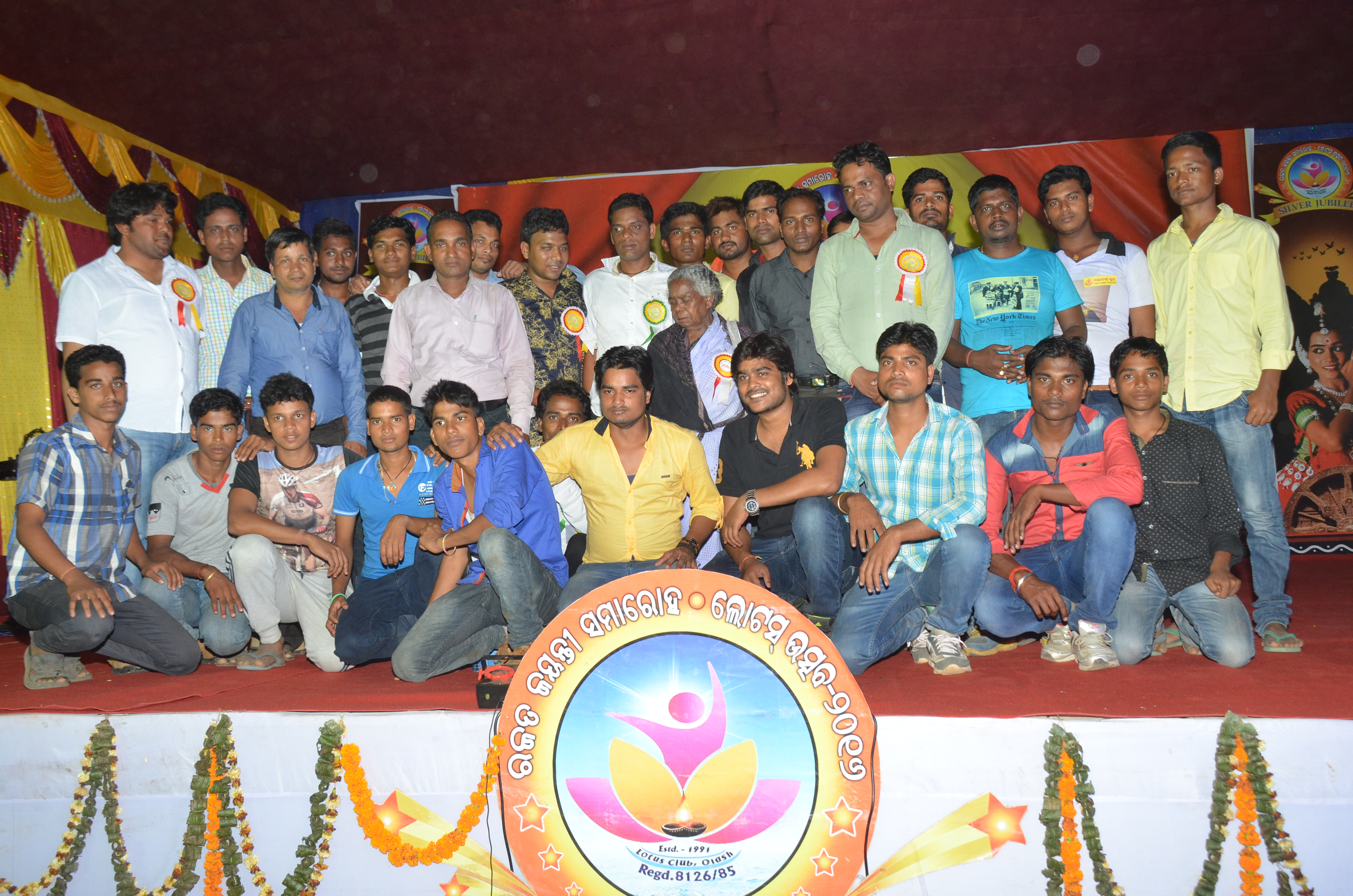
Lotus Club

Olash is a coastal village in Jagatsinghpur district of Odisha, India. It is a village having a population of about 1,000 people, and is located about 30 km from the district town of Jagatsinghpur on the Cuttack–Naharana road, about 5 km from the Bay of Bengal to the east. The village is known for paddy and Chilly cultivation.

This village comes under "Apandara" Panchayat which falls under "Balikuda-Erasama" constituencies of Jagatsinghpur, Odisha, India. There are 140+ families in this village. The shape as in map looks like a square. It has two entrances and both are open to east of the village. It consists of 5 divisions i.e. Danda Sahi, Tala Sahi, Gaon upara, Matha Sahi and Chhaka Upara, In the heart of the village "Lotus Club" and Olash primary school are situated.

On the western side of the village, the Mugura Nali is located, which is a distributary associated with the Devi River and was used to drain off tidal saline water. The flow of water in this distributary became less after an embankment (or bandh) had been built. For controlling floods and maintaining water flow, there were plans to build an anicut.

"Maa Budhi Sahadei" is the worshiped Goddess of the village. She is the living goddess for the villagers and they offer prasad by one family daily on a rotation basis and chronologically. A priest is appointed for the worship of daily deeds of the Goddess for a remuneration by the villagers. Non-veg is allowed here and also in each full moon day, the Goddess is being offered Prasad (flatted rice, Pudding and Dalma - a unique each odia's favourite and delicious food that is made out of a mix of dal, some vegetables and ghee). Once in each year, for the occasion of Marjana (Holiness) of the Goddess, the villagers contribute for a festival in the temple premise.

Most of the villagers are farmers. There are different types of Self-Help-Groups created by the village women by which they are living in a good economic standard and also they are working on some developmental works for the village. This village is well connected to roads and the good communication facility to all across the Market has made the business of produced agricultural products more feasible to earn a handsome return for the farmers.

The villagers also celebrate a lot of festivals including Dussehra, Raja, Kumar purnima, Dola, Manabasa, Panchuka, Saraswati Puja, Ganesh Puja, Akasatana, Janmastami, Agni Ustav, and many more.
