= Kuakhai River =

River in Odisha, India

Coordinates: 20.302068°N 85.882315°E

Kuakhai River is a distributary of Mahanadi River which flows by Bhubaneswar, Odisha. Mahanadi River branches off at Naraj, Cuttack as Kathajodi River, then immediately it is bifurcated, with its southern branch flowing as Kuakhai River. The Kushabhadra River branches off from the Kuakhai River in Gandarpur, Balianta and flows in a south-western direction towards Nimapara and Gop into the Bay of Bengal. The Daya River starts as a branch of the Kuakhai River at Saradeipur (near Badahati) and is then joined by the Malaguni River below Golabai and flows through Khordha and Puri districts before emptying into the north-eastern corner of Chilika Lake. Most of the water supply of Bhubaneswar is met by the Kuakhai river, along with Daya River.
