= Streptomyces chilikensis =

Scientific classification
- Domain: Bacteria
- Kingdom: Bacillati
- Phylum: Actinomycetota
- Class: Actinomycetia
- Order: Streptomycetales
- Family: Streptomycetaceae
- Genus: Streptomyces
- Species: S. chilikensis

Binomial name
- Streptomyces chilikensis Ray et al. 2013

Type strain
- DSM 42072, JCM 18411, RC 1830

Species of bacterium

Streptomyces chilikensis is a halophilic and alkali tolerant bacterium species from the genus of Streptomyces which has been isolated from brackish water sediment from the Chilika Lake in Chandrapur in the Khurdha district of Odisha in India.

== See also ==
- List of Streptomyces species
