= Streptomyces barkulensis =

Scientific classification
- Domain: Bacteria
- Kingdom: Bacillati
- Phylum: Actinomycetota
- Class: Actinomycetia
- Order: Streptomycetales
- Family: Streptomycetaceae
- Genus: Streptomyces
- Species: S. barkulensis

Binomial name
- Streptomyces barkulensis Ray et al. 2014

Type strain
- DSM 42082, JCM 18754, RC 1831

Species of bacterium

Streptomyces barkulensis is a bacterium species from the genus of Streptomyces which has been isolated from water sediments near the Chilika Lake in the Barkul village in Odisha in India.

== See also ==
- List of Streptomyces species
