= Alipada =

Village in Odisha, India

Coordinates: 19.812571°N 85.763000°E

Alipada is a village to the north of Chilika Lake. It comes under Puri District.
