= Bhargavi River =

River in Odisha, India

Bhargavi Dandabhanga Nadi
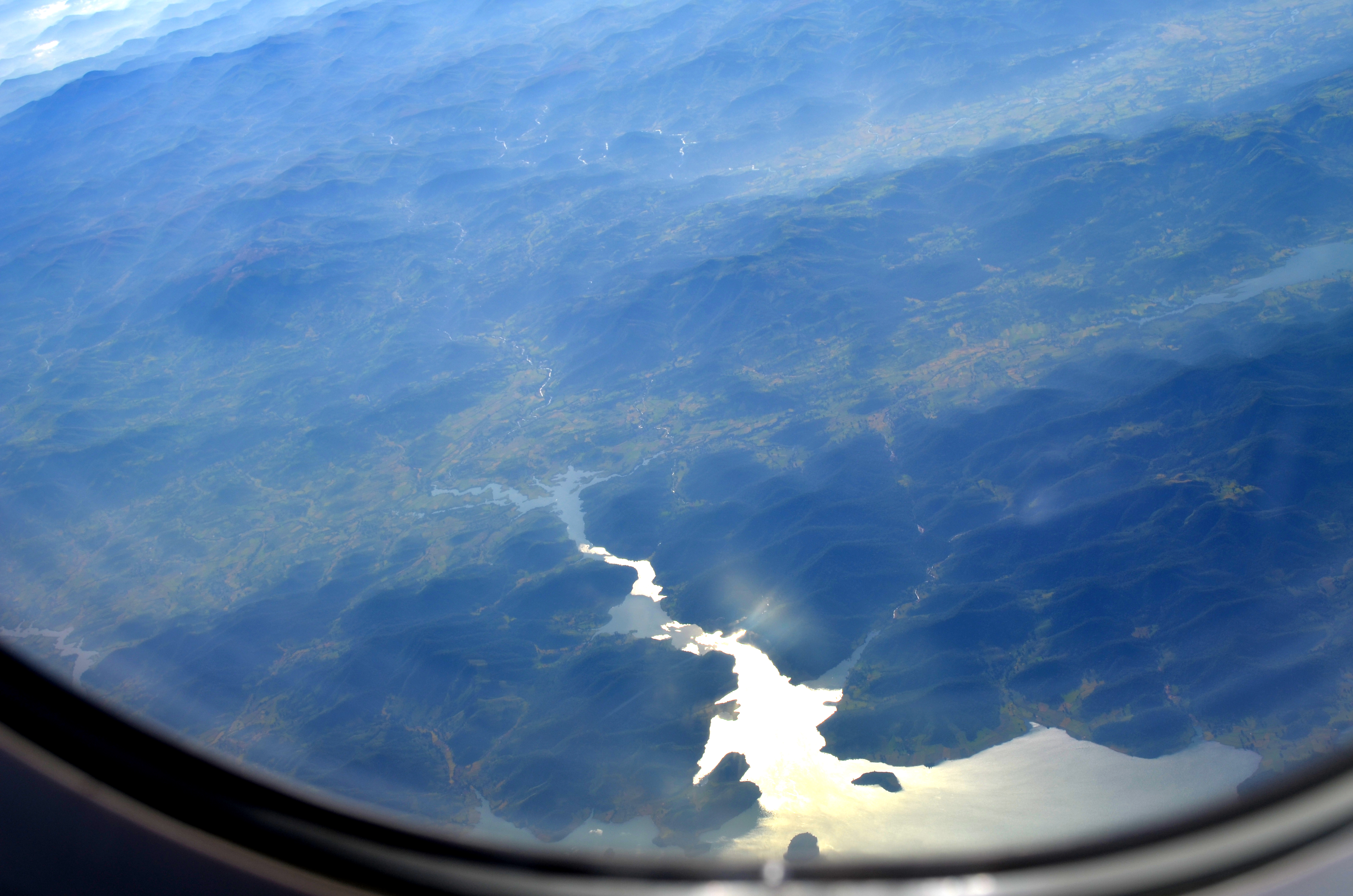
- Aerial view of Bhargavi river

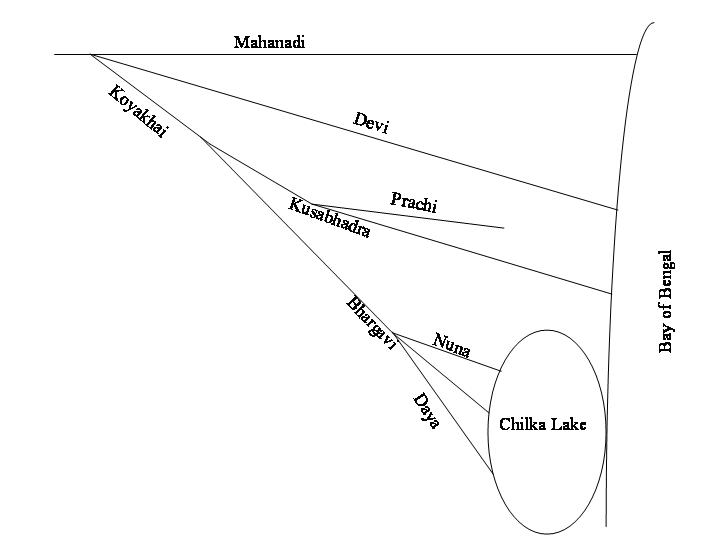
- An illustration of Mahanadi–Kuakhai distributary system in Odisha, India, draining into the Bay of Bengal and Chilka Lake. Picture not drawn to scale
- Etymology: Bharga (Sun God)'s sacred yoga site

Location
- Country: India
- State: Odisha
- Region: East India
- District: Khurda

Physical characteristics
- Source: Mahanadi
  - location: Cuttack, Odisha, India
- Mouth: River Kuakhai
  - location: Odisha, India
  - coordinates: 17°0′N 81°48′E
  - elevation: 0 m (0 ft)
- Length: 1,465 km (910 mi)

Bhargavi River flows across Odisha, India. It forms the Mahanadi–Kuakhai distributary system branching off from the Kuakhai River at Saradeipurpatna and draining into Chilka Lake.

A branch of the Kuakhai River meets the Bay of Bengal after breaking up into numerous distributaries in the last 4.0 kilometres (2.5 mi) of its course. There are four main distributaries, all branching off from the left bank: the Kanchi, East Kania, Naya Nadi and South Kanchi (which drains into Sar Lake). By various channels the first three are interconnected and finally join the Suna Munhi River, which flows into Bali Harchandi and ultimately drains to the Bay of Bengal via the mouth of Chilika. The South Kania gets lost in the marshes on the western shore of Chilika.

== Religious significance ==
In 2021, A heritage research group team found ruins of an ancient temple of 13-14th century Common Era near the mouth of the Bhargavi river in Balanga area, 31 km from Puri city.
