= Gandarpur =

- Village
- Location in Orissa, India
- Coordinates: 20°23′25.692″N 85°51′6.3174″E
- Country: India
- State: Odisha
- District: Khurda

Population (2011)
  - Total: 3,109

Languages
  - Official: Odia, English
- Time zone: UTC+5:30 (IST)
- Postal code: 754005

Gandarpur is a village located in the northern part of the district of Khordha in the Indian state of Odisha. In 2011, the population was 3,109 persons in 606 households.

== Geography ==
The village is situated on the west bank of Kuakhai River.Village West side New Bhubaneswar Railway Station

== Government ==
An elected sarpanch administrates the village.

== Culture ==
Khandayat cast people are there living

Raja (festival) Durga poja ଏଠାରେ ଧୁୁୁମ ଧାମ ରେ ପାଳନ କରାଯାଏ। Lakshmi Puja ମାଣ ବସା ଗୁରୁବାର Kartikeyapuja Durga Puja ବଡ଼ ଓଷା ପାଳନ କରାଯାଏ ।

=== Temples ===
- Maa Mangala, Dula Dei, Durga Temple
- Laxmi Narayan Temple
- Nitai Gouri Temple
- Maa Jhamu Mangala Temple
- Maa Kateni Mangala Temple
- Maa Mangala Temple
- Sai Samantha Temple

=== Sports ===
- Shastiji Club
- Shine Star Club
- United youth sports club
- Kalinga Yuva Bikash Parishad

=== Schools ===
• Sri Aurobinda Bidyapitha Gandarpur

- Bhagat Ghara (ଅଖାଡା ଘର)
- Gandarpur primary school
- Saraswati sishu bidya mandira
- This article edited
