= Daya River =

River in India

Coordinates: 19°53′N 85°35′E

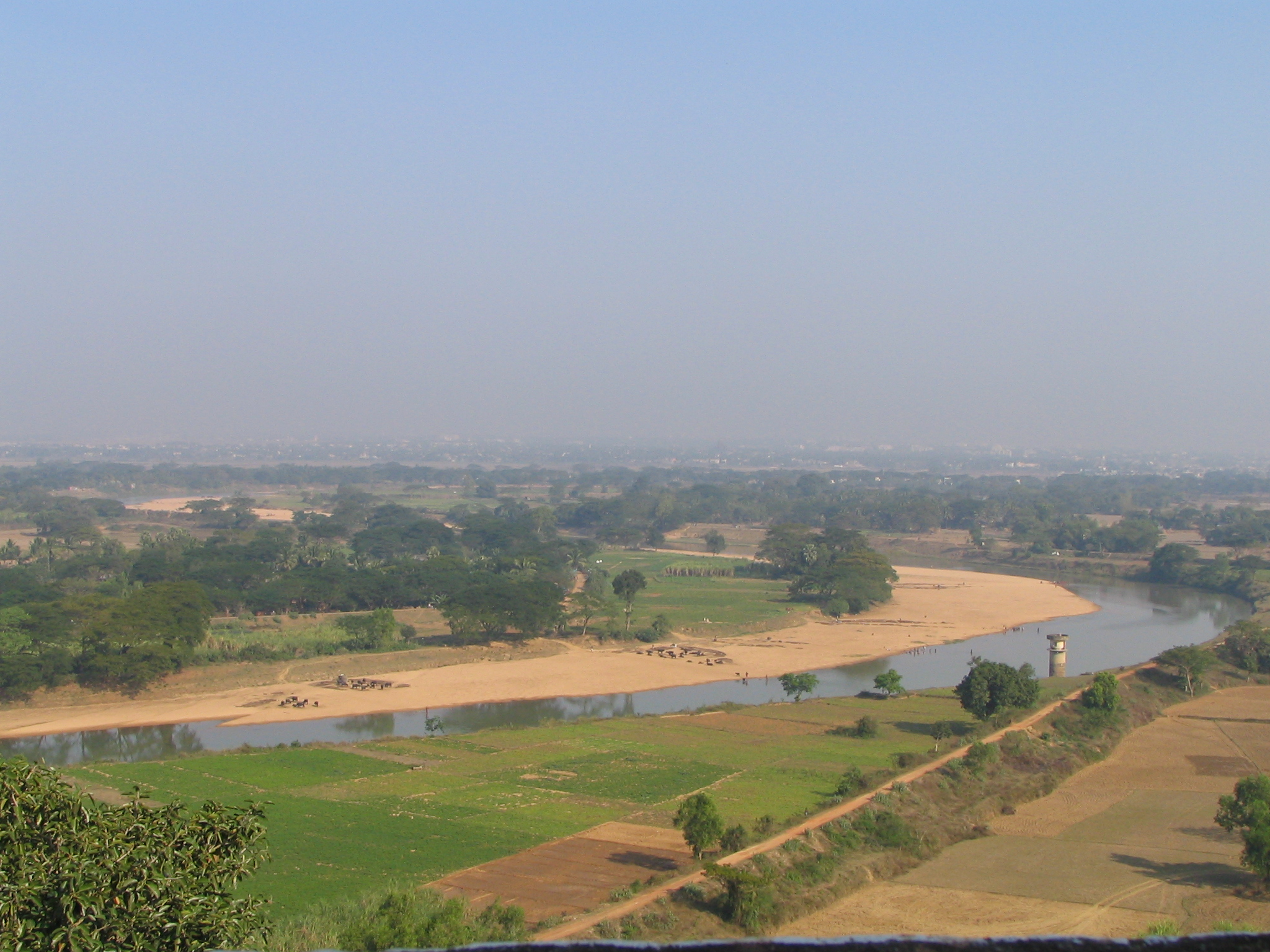
- Banks of the River Daya, also the supposed battlefield of Kalinga War from atop Dhauli hills
- Native name: ଦୟା ନଦୀ (Odia)

Location
- Country: India

Physical characteristics
- Source: Kuakhai River
  - location: Odisha
- Mouth: Bay of Bengal and Chilka lake

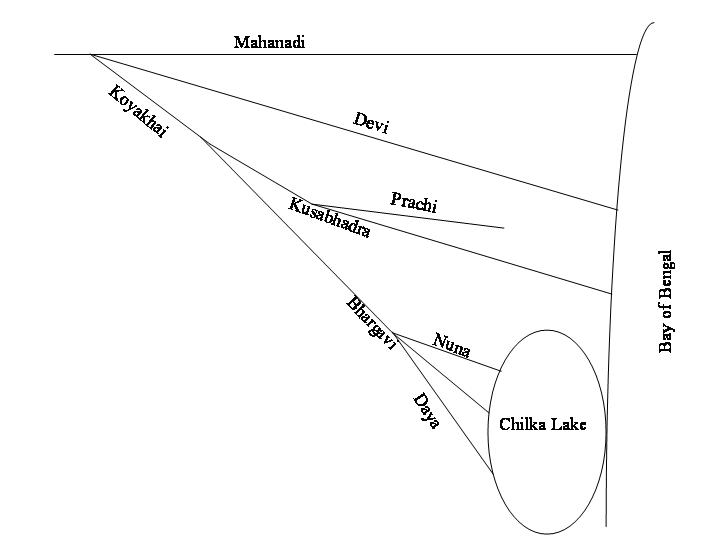
An illustration of Mahanadi Koyakhai distributary system in Odisha, India draining into Bay of Bengal and Chilka lake. Picture not drawn to scale

The Daya River starts as a branch of the Kuakhai River at Saradeipur (near Badahati) in Odisha state in India. It is joined by the Malaguni River below Golabai and flows through Khordha and Puri districts before emptying into the north-eastern corner of Chilika Lake, 37 kilometres (23 mi) from its origin.

The historically important Dhauli hill is located on the banks of the Daya River, 8 kilometres (5 mi) south of Bhubaneswar. It is a hill with vast open space adjoining it, and has major edicts of Ashoka engraved on a mass of rock, by the side of the road leading to the summit of the hill. Dhauli hill is presumed to be the area where Kalinga War was fought.
