= Satpada =

Satapada Satpada
- Town
- Location in Odisha, India Satapada (India)
- Coordinates: 19°44′0″N 85°39′0″E
- Country: India
- State: Odisha
- District: Puri

Languages
  - Official: Odia
- Time zone: UTC+5:30 (IST)
- Vehicle registration: OD-13 (RTO Puri)
- Nearest city: Puri
- Website: odisha.gov.in

Satapada is a town in Puri district, Odisha, India.

== Geography ==
Satapada is located at 19°40'10"N and 85°26'38"E. It is located on the southern part of the Chilika Lake near to village Panasapada which is 36 km away from Puri. Satapada is also famous for the Sea Mouth Island where Chilika Lake meets the Bay of Bengal.

== About ==
In Odia sata means "seven" and pada means "village", so Satapada means group of seven villages. It is located 50 kilometers from Puri. Satapada on Chilika is home to the Irrawaddy dolphin (Orcaella brevirostris).

== Tourism ==
Satpada is located at the northeast cape of Chilika Lake and Bay of Bengal. The famous Chilika dolphins can be seen in their natural best here. There are also ample opportunities for canoeing, kayaking and boating. A small island called Rajahamsa is situated near this place at the mouth of the lagoon. It is named after the rajahamsa (mute swan). This island is 18 kilometers from Satapada. Rajahans is a small strip of land of which one side is placed near the lagoon and the other side is towards the Bay of Bengal.

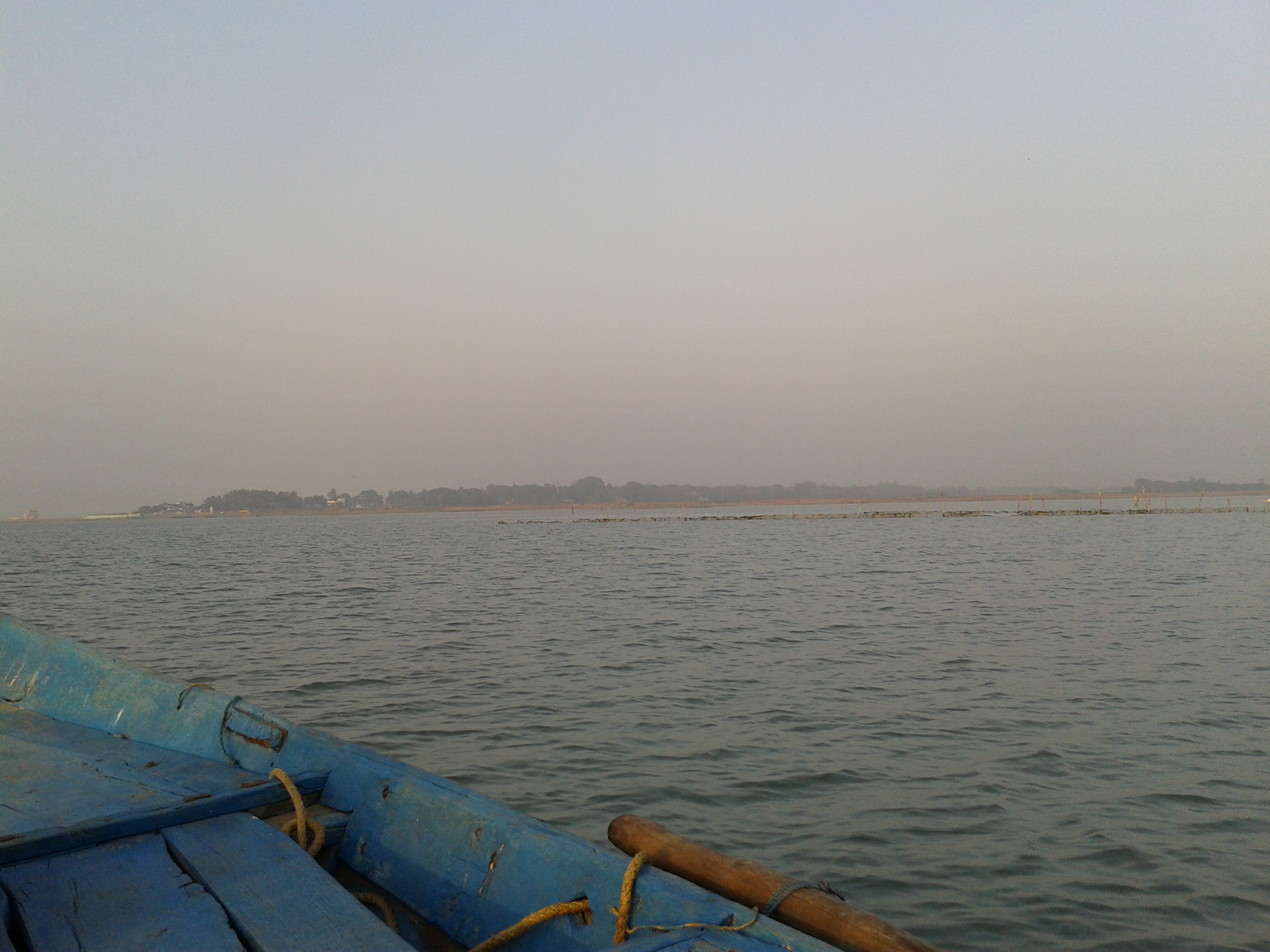
Chilika Lake at Satpada, Odisha

Migratory birds do not visit Satapada very often, but a few varieties of migratory birds move to Nalabana bird sanctuary. It takes around four hours by boat from Satapada to reach Nalaban.

== Connectivity ==
Road: National Highway 203A connects Satpada to Puri, 49 km away. Bhubaneshwar and Puri have daily bus services along with taxis to Satapada. Conducted tours are also organised by OTDC and local tour operators.

Rail: Nearest rail head is at Puri, around 50 km away. Puri connects to all the major places in the country via superfast and express trains.

Air: The nearest airport is Biju Patnaik Airport at Bhubaneswar, around 120 km away.
