= Golabai =

Village in Odisha

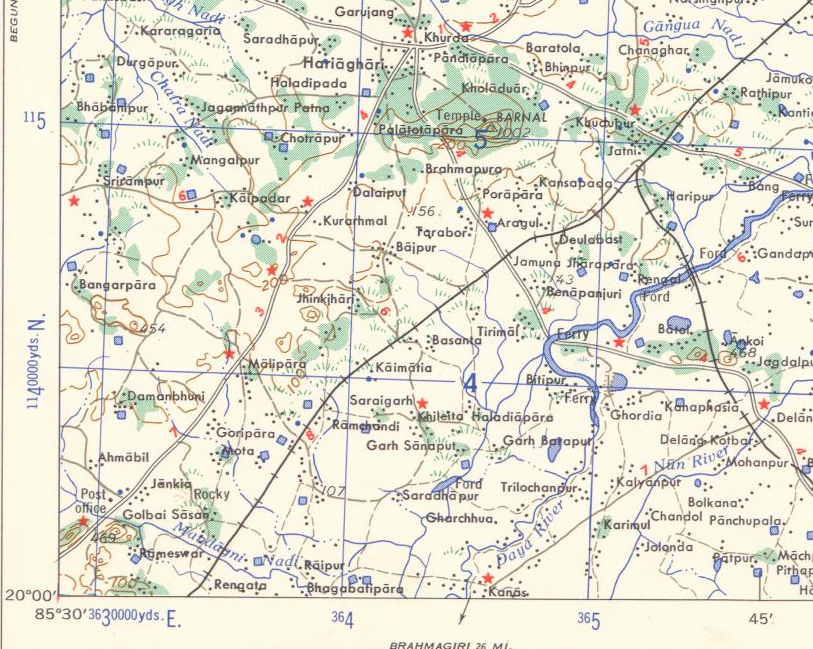
Golbai Sasan village, 1959 (bottom Left)

Golabai Sasan prehistoric mound settlement

Golabai Sasan (or Golbai Sasan) is a village in Khurda District, Odisha, India at 20°1′21″N 85°33′0″E.

It is known for its medieval temple architecture. This settlement site is located on the north bank of the Malaguni River, north of Chilika Lake.

Trial excavations in 1991 showed a succession of Chalcolithic and Iron Age assemblages, presumably dating to the 2nd and 1st millennia BCE. Sinha described the pottery and wares as being of dull red and grey colours.

Excavations in 2003 and 2011, conducted by Prof. RK Mohanty of Deccan College and a multi-national team, showed that the site dates to the Neolithic Period (c. 3500 BP).

Archaeobotanical analysis showed that the people living at this site grew and ate rice, browntop millet, mung bean, horsegram, pigeon pea and citrus fruits. Zooarchaeological analysis shows that they ate cattle, nilgai, chital, wild pig and possibly buffalo. They used animal bone and horn to make tools, such as bone harpoons and digging sticks. They lived in circular huts made from wood with rammed earth floors.

Golbai Sasan, Sankarjang, Gopalpur, Ostapur, Suabarei and Khambeswaripali are some of the main sites in Odisha dating to the Neolithic-Chalcolithic periods.

The recovery of many woodworking adzes and other artifacts from Chilika Lake denotes that Golabai was a boat-building center, especially boitas which were prominent in the maritime history of Kalinga.

== Transport ==
Golabai railway station is situated on the Khurda Road–Visakhapatnam section of Khurda Road railway division of Indian Railways.
