= Malaguni River =

Malangui Nullah at Golabai

The Malaguni River (Mallaguni, Malangui) is a Nullah or hill stream in Khurda District, Odisha state of India. It originates on the border of Ganjam District and Khurda District. It flows northeast, east and southeast through Khurda Tahasil, passes historic Golabai Sassan and joins the Daya River at 20°0′1″N 85°37′30″E, 1 km (0.62 mi) north of Balabhadrapur village in Puri District. The Daya then flows southwest into Chilika Lake, which then flows into the Bay of Bengal.

There is a minor irrigation project constructed on this stream near Rameswar village. When it floods, some portions of Khurda, Chilika and Tangi blocks are badly affected.
