= Rambha, Odisha =

Rambha
- Town
- Location in Odisha, India Rambha (India)
- Coordinates: 19.52°N 85.1°E
- Country: India
- State: Odisha
- District: Ganjam
- Elevation: 87 m (285 ft)

Population (2011)
  - Total: 12,111

Languages
  - Official: Odia
- Time zone: UTC+5:30 (IST)
- Vehicle registration: OD
- Website: odisha.gov.in

Rambha is a town and a notified area council in Ganjam district in the Indian state of Odisha.

== Geography ==
Rambha is located at 19.52°N 85.1°E. It has an average elevation of 87 metres (285 feet).

== Demographics ==
As of 2001 India census, Rambha had a population of 10,715. Males constitute 50% of the population and females 50%. Rambha has an average literacy rate of 56%, lower than the national average of 59.5%: male literacy is 69%, and female literacy is 44%. In Rambha, 15% of the population is under 6 years of age.

Religion in Rambha
Hinduism	99.08%
Islam	0.31%
Christianity	0.49%
Sikh	0.01%
Buddhist	0.02%
Jain	0.00%
Not Stated	0.10%
Other	0.00%

== Climate and regional setting ==
Maximum summer temperature is 37 °C; minimum winter temperature is 17 °C. The mean daily temperature varies from 33 °C to 38 °C. May is the hottest month; December is the coldest. The average annual rainfall is 1250 mm and the region receives monsoon and torrential rainfall from July to October.

Climate data for Rambha, Odisha
Month	Jan	Feb	Mar	Apr	May	Jun	Jul	Aug	Sep	Oct	Nov	Dec	Year
Mean daily maximum °C (°F)	27 (81)	30 (86)	34 (93)	36 (97)	37 (99)	34 (93)	32 (90)	31 (88)	32 (90)	32 (90)	30 (86)	28 (82)	32 (90)
Mean daily minimum °C (°F)	16 (61)	19 (66)	23 (73)	27 (81)	29 (84)	28 (82)	27 (81)	27 (81)	26 (79)	23 (73)	20 (68)	16 (61)	23 (74)
Average rainfall mm (inches)	12.40 (0.49)	17.40 (0.69)	18.60 (0.73)	15.00 (0.59)	40.30 (1.59)	150.00 (5.91)	282.10 (11.11)	272.80 (10.74)	180.00 (7.09)	93.00 (3.66)	33.00 (1.30)	18.60 (0.73)	1,133.2 (44.63)
Source: MSM Weather
