= Chilika Lake =

Lagoon in India

Chilika
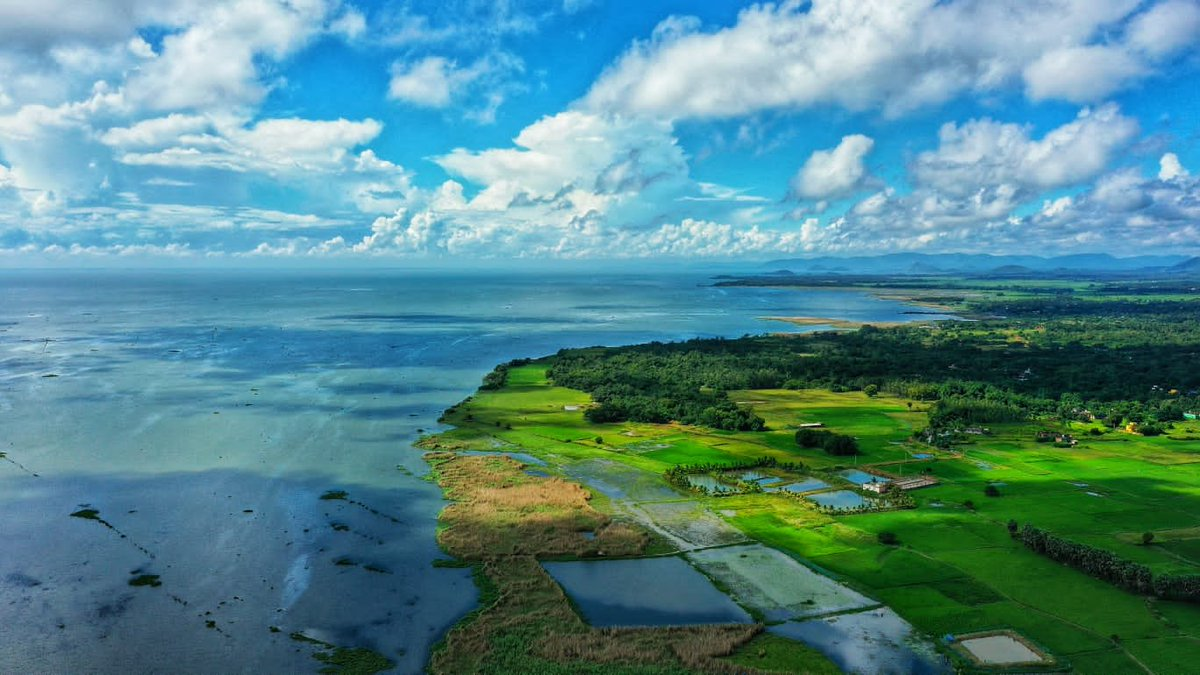
- Birds eyeview of Chilika Lake

- Location within Odisha Location within India
- Interactive map of Chilika
- Location: Odisha
- Coordinates: 19°43′N 85°19′E
- Lake type: Brackish, lagoon
- Primary inflows: 52 streams including the Bhargavi, Daya, Makra, Malaguni and Luna rivers
- Primary outflows: Old mouth at Arakhakuda, new mouth at Satpada to Bay of Bengal
- Catchment area: 3,560 km^{2} (1,370 sq mi)
- Basin countries: India
- Max. length: 64.3 km (40.0 mi)
- Surface area: min.: 900 km^{2} (347 sq mi) max.: 1,165 km^{2} (450 sq mi)
- Max. depth: 4.2 m (13.8 ft)
- Water volume: 4 km^{3} (3,200,000 acre⋅ft)
- Surface elevation: 0 – 2 m (6.6 ft)
- Islands: 223 km^{2} (86 sq mi): Badakuda, Breakfast, Honeymoon, Kalijai Island, Birds Island, Kanthapantha, Krushnaprasada (Old Parikuda), Nalabana, Nuapara, Somolo and Sanakuda.
- Settlements: Balugaon, Satpada, Parikud, Rambha

Ramsar Wetland
- Designated: 1 October 1981
- Reference no.: 229

Chilika Lake is the largest brackish water lagoon with estuarine characteristics along the east coast of Indian sub-continent in Asia and second largest coastal lagoon in the world, its area ranges from about 900 to 11,165 sq km during summers and monsoon respectively. It is spread over the Puri, Khordha and Ganjam districts of Odisha state on the east coast of India, at the mouth of the Daya River, flowing into the Bay of Bengal.

It is one of the first two wetlands in India to be designated as a Ramsar site, receiving this recognition in 1981. It has been listed as a tentative UNESCO World Heritage site. Its salinity varies by region, from freshwater where rivers flow in, to oceanic salinity levels due to tidal influx.

Chilika is recognised as one of the best-managed Ramsar sites in Asia and received the Ramsar Wetland Conservation Award in 2002. The lagoon supports extraordinary biodiversity including over 225 bird species, the endangered Irrawaddy dolphin, and numerous fish, invertebrate, and aquatic plant species. It provides livelihoods to approximately 200,000 fisherfolk from over 130 villages around its shores. Chilika Lake is also a globally significant wintering ground for migratory waterbirds.

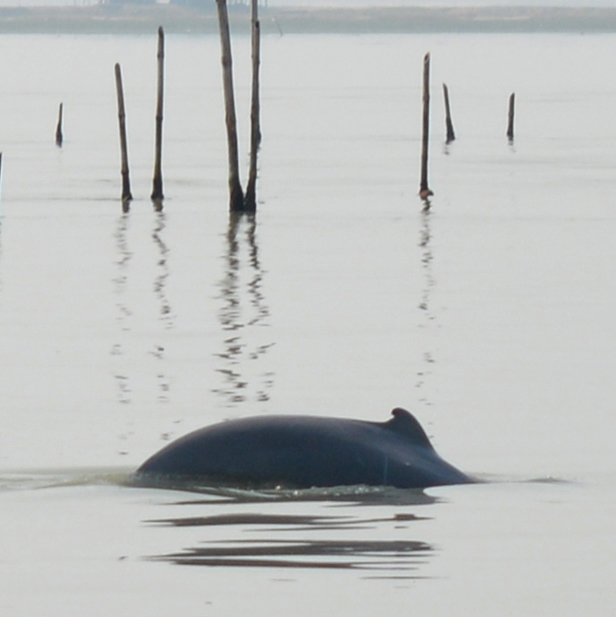
Irrawaddy dolphin in Chilika Lake, Satpada

== History ==
Golabai Sasan excavation site

Geological evidence indicates that Chilika Lake was part of the Bay of Bengal during the later stages of the Pleistocene period (1.8 million to 10,000 years BP).

Excavations were conducted by the Archaeological Survey of India at Golabai Sasan (20°1′7″N 85°32′54″E), north of Chilika lake in Khurdha district. Golabai provides evidence of a sequence of Chilika area culture in three phases: Neolithic (c. 1600 BCE), Chalcolithic (c. 1400 BCE to c. 900 BCE) and Iron Age (c. 900 BCE to c. 800 BCE). Radiocarbon dating traced the earliest level of Golbai to 2300 BCE. The site is located on the left bank of the Malaguni River, a tributary of the Daya River, which flows into Chilika Lake. This location, which gave access to the sea via Chilika Lake, gives evidence of the maritime activities of this region. The recovery of many woodworking adzes and other artifacts shows that Golabai was a boat-building centre. Golabai is the only excavated site in Odisha where boat building has been revealed. This also indicates that Chilika lake was close to Golabai and it facilitated the maritime trade of people in the area during the ancient period.

Ancient texts say the southern sector of Chilika was a major harbour for maritime commerce, when Kharavela (c. 209 BCE–after 170 BCE), the king of Kalinga, was known as the "Lord of the Sea".

Ptolemy (150 CE), the Greek geographer, referred to Palur as the port Paloura, located close to the point of departure situated outside of the southern tip of the lake at Kantiagarh, from where ships bound for different parts of Southeast Asia, sailed. After 639, the Chinese pilgrims Fa-Hien and Hiuen-Tsang mention a famous port "Che-li-ta-loChing" near the shore of the ocean which was a thoroughfare and resting place for seagoing traders and strangers from distant lands. This port was located at 'Chhatragarh' on the banks of Chilika Lake.

A fourth-century legend, often told to explain the birth of Chilika, states that the pirate king, Raktabahu, planned to attack Puri with a huge fleet of ships. To avoid detection, he stealthily anchored out of sight, off the mouth to the sea. The deception was revealed by the ships' refuse floating to the shore, thus warning the town's people, who escaped with all their possessions. Raktabahu felt betrayed when he found an abandoned town and directed his fury towards the sea that had betrayed him. The sea parted to let the army march in, then surged back, drowned the army and formed the present lake.

Archeological excavations discovered seventh-century ship anchors and stone memoirs dedicated to battle heroes at a village named Kanas, about 25 km (16 mi) north of Chilika on the banks of Nuna river, which flows into the lake. This gives evidence of a historic naval engagement off the coast.

A 10th-century text, the Brahmanda Purana, mentions Chilika Lake as an important centre of trade and commerce, and a shelter for ships sailing to Java, Malaya, Singhala, China and other countries. This suggests that the lake was then deep enough for berthing seagoing ships and had a channel to the sea big enough for loaded trading ships embarking to Southeast Asia. The villagers around Chilika Lake still observe an annual festival called "Bali Yatra" (Journey to Bali).

In 1803, the British entered the shores of the lake, reached Puri and occupied Odisha with the help of Fateh Muhammed. Fateh Muhammed, in turn, was rewarded by the British with freehold of the areas of Malud and Parikud, of the present day Garh Krishnaprasad revenue block.

Over the years, poets including Kabibar Radhanath Ray and Pandit Godavarish Mishra, freedom fighters and Saints have extolled historicity of the lake as pertinent to its cultural, spiritual, religious and scenic aspects.

"Gopabandhu Das, a famous Odiya poet, became impatient to see the beauty of the march of colorful sights and sounds of Chilika lagoon while going by train. He asked the speeding train to stop for a moment so that he could enjoy the beauty. It is because of the beauty that arrests him much".

Chilika is an integral part of the culture of coastal Odisha. Almost 400 years ago, the saint poet Purshottam Das, a devotee of Lord Jagannath, wrote a poem about Lord Krishna dancing with a milkmaid called Maniki, who had come to sell curds on the banks of the Chilika.

== Geology ==
The lake is of estuarine character in an ephemeral environment. Geological studies indicate that the coastline extended along the western shores of the lake in the Pleistocene era with its northeastern region lying under the sea. That the coastline has moved eastward over the ages is supported by the fact that the nearby Konark Sun Temple, built originally on the seashore a few hundred years ago, is now about 3 km (2 mi), away from the coast.

The catchment area of Chilika lake has a rock, sand and mud substratum. It contains a wide range of sedimentary particles such as clay, silt, sand, gravel and shell banks but the major part of the catchment area is silt. Around 1.6 million metric tons per year of sediment is deposited in Chilika lake by rivers Daya and several streams.

It is conjectured that a rise in worldwide sea levels over the last 6,000–8,000 years occurred with a pause in the rise of sea level about 7,000 years ago, which could have resulted in the formation of a sandy beach near the coast at the Southern sector. With the rise in the sea level, the sand beach grew gradually, progressed seaward to the northeast and formed the spit of Chilika. A fossil unearthed from the southwestern edge of the spit indicates that the lake was formed about 3,500–4,000 years ago. The abrupt change in the direction of the coast north of the lake, strong winds shifting sand to the shore, longshore drift (littoral drift), the presence or absence of strong river and tidal currents in different areas are the reasons attributed for the growth of the spit.

White bands of coral in the southern sector, at a height of 8 m (26 ft), above the present water level, shows that the area was once marine and that the water was much deeper than present. The chronological development of the outer barrier spit of the lake has been dated by Optically stimulated luminescence studies of minerals. This was done on sixteen samples of the lake bed. The studies indicated doses of between 153 ± 3 mGy and 2.23 ± 0.07 Gy, corresponding to ages from 40 years at the top of the spit to 300 years at the bottom. The youngest ages are consistent with the age of the overlying vegetation. A clearly defined period of > 4.0 km (2.5 mi) of barrier construction 40 years ago is identified. Prior to that the deposition rate was relatively constant for 300 years.'"

== Geography and topography ==
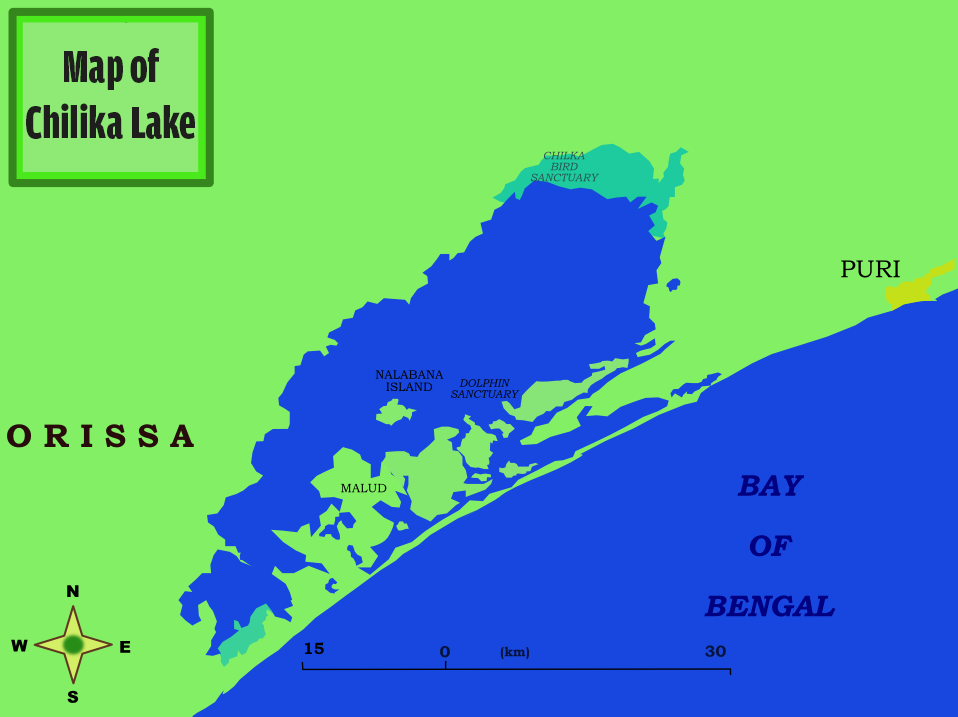
This map of Chilika Lake showing Nalaban Island, Chilika Bird Sanctuary, Dolphin Sanctuary, Puri town and Malud peninsula.

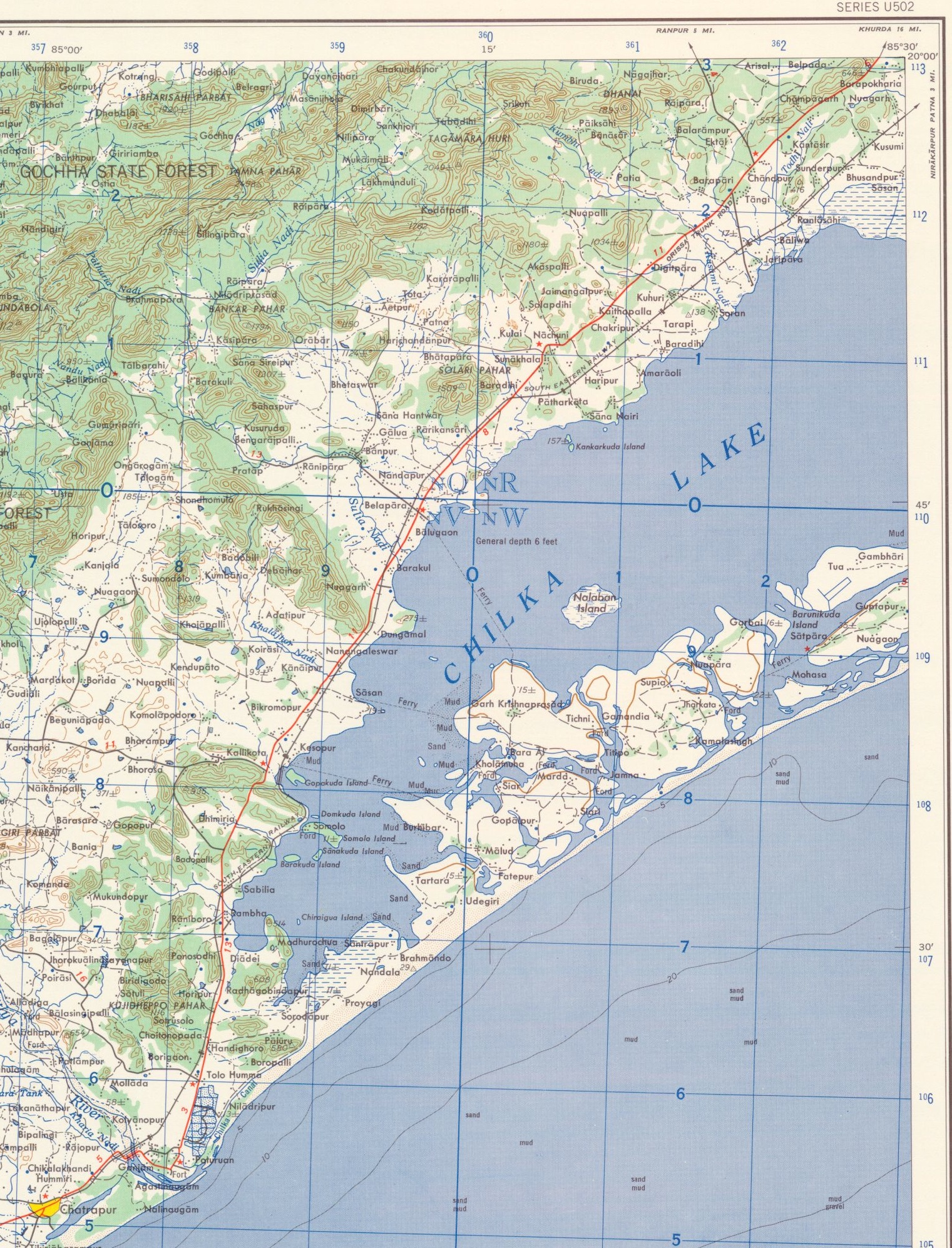
Chilika Lake-central & west 1958 Topographic map, 1:250,000

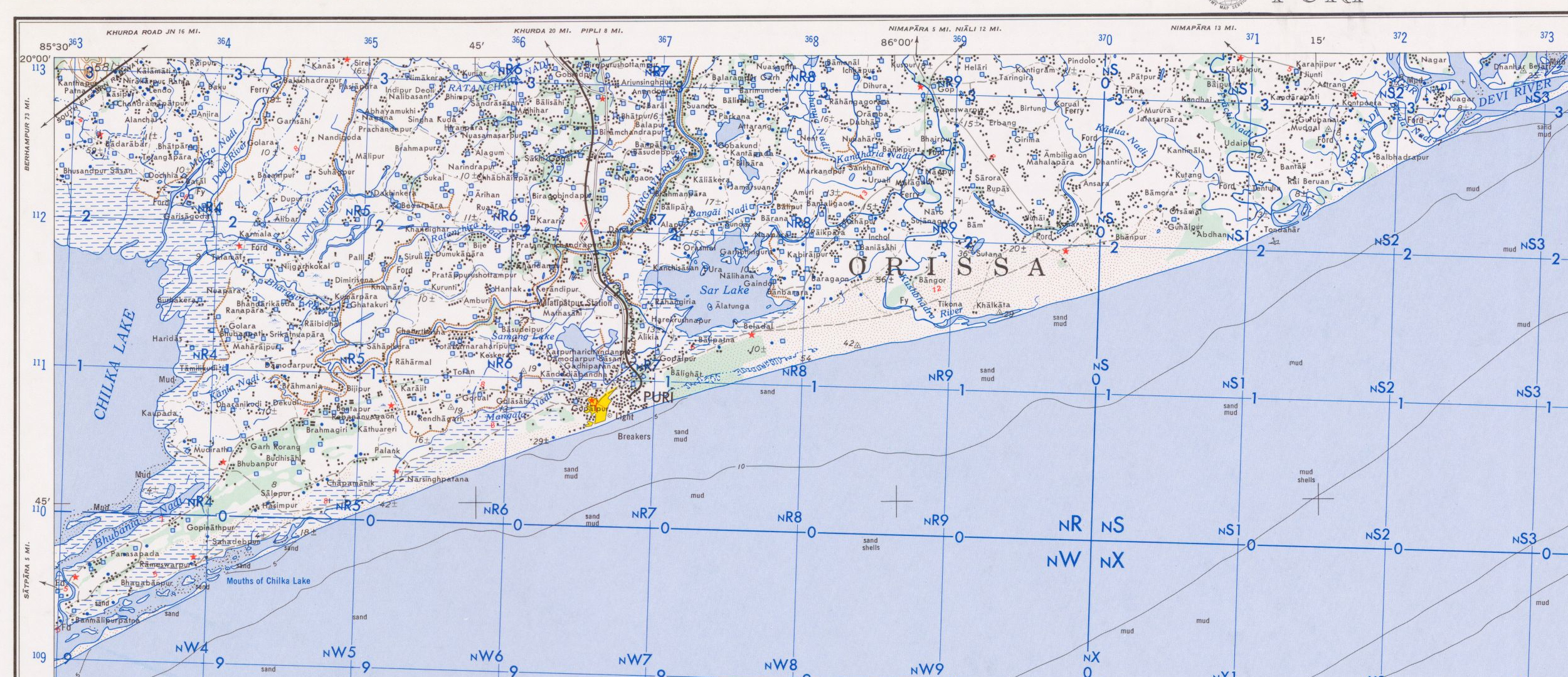
Chilika Lake-east end

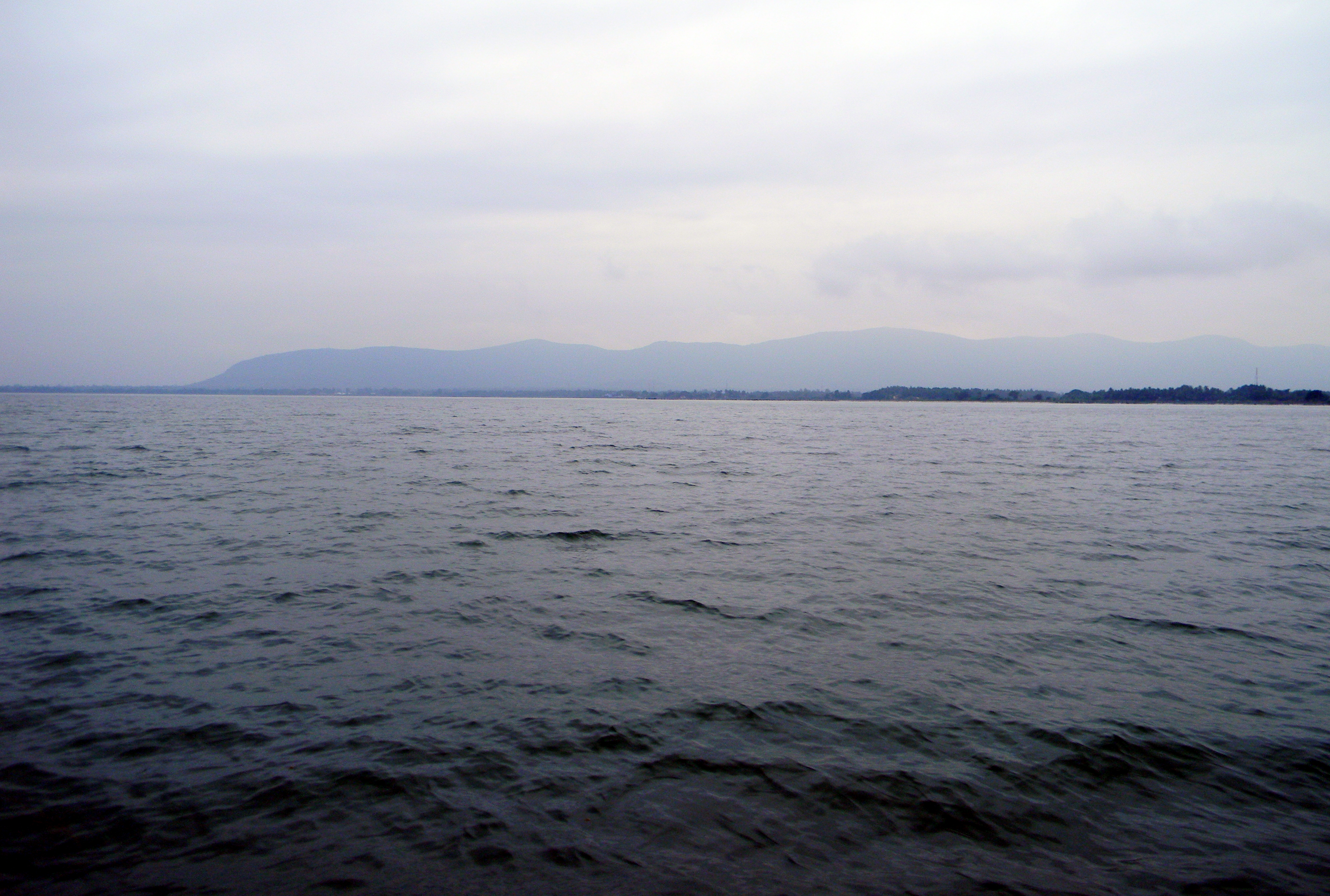
Chilika Lake

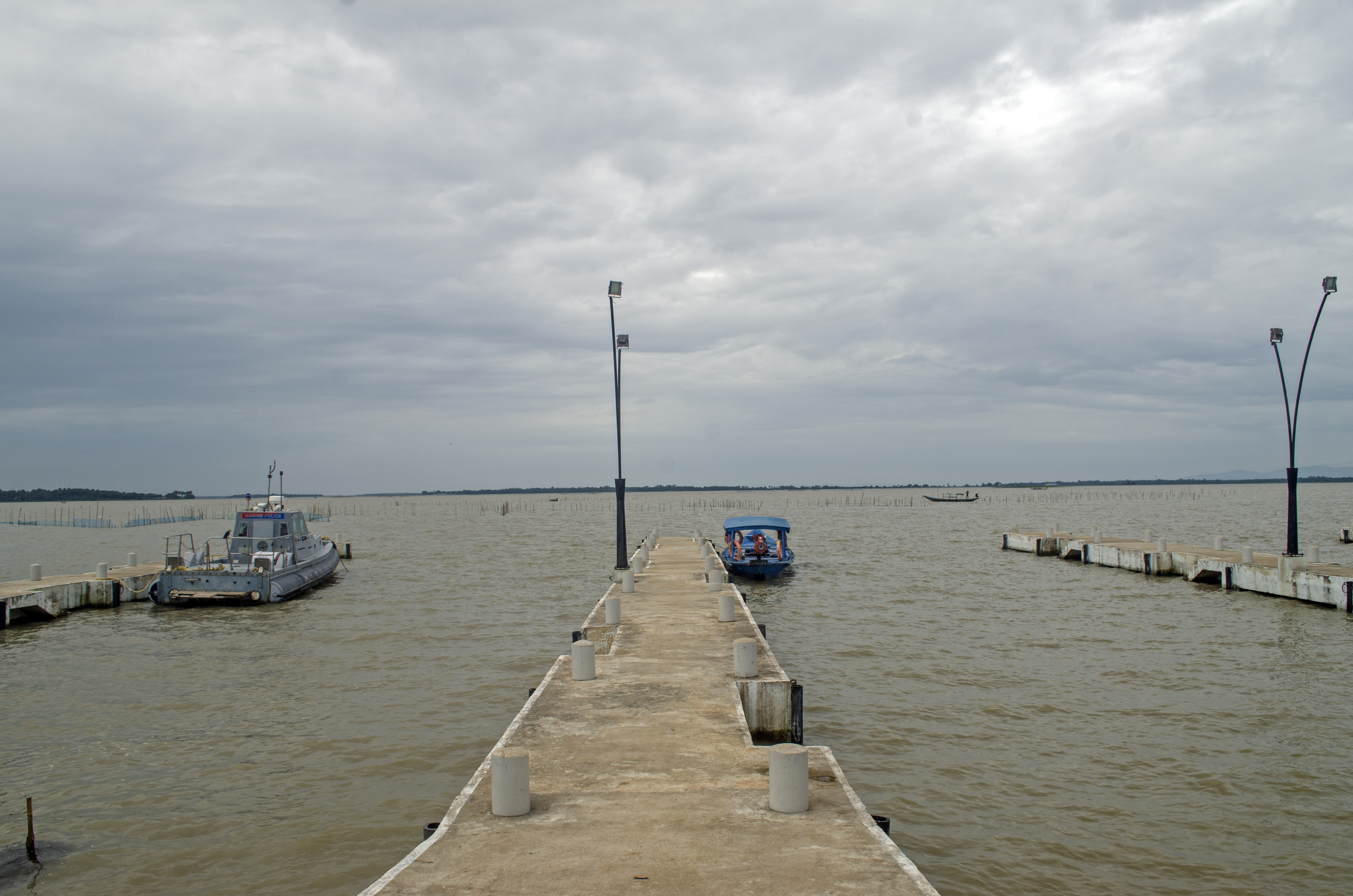
Jetty at Satapada, Chilika Lake, Odisha

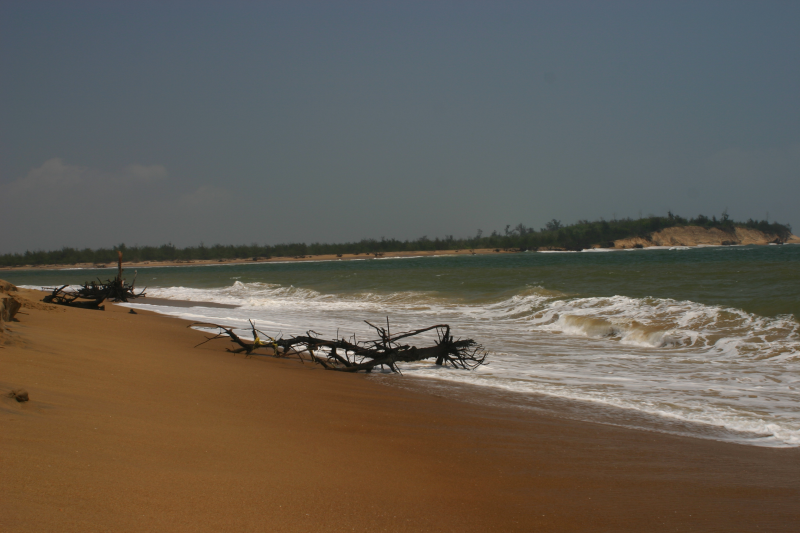
Chilika Sea mouth

Chilika Lake is a shallow bar-built estuary with large areas of mudflats. The western and southern margins of the lake are fringed by the Eastern Ghats hill range.

Several inland rivers, which bring silt into the lake, control the northern end of the lake. A 60 km (37 mi) long barrier beach called Rejhansa, formed by northerly currents in the Bay of Bengal, resulted in the formation of this shallow lake and forms its eastern side. As an ephemeral lake, its water surface area varies from 1,165 km^{2} (449.8 sq mi) in the summer monsoon season to 906 km^{2} (349.8 sq mi) in the winter dry season.

The water spread area of the lagoon ranges between 1,165 and 906 square kilometres (450 and 350 sq mi) during the monsoon and summer respectively. A 32-kilometre (20 mi) long, narrow, outer channel connects the lagoon to the Bay of Bengal, near the village Motto. More recently, a new mouth has been opened by Chilika Development Authority (CDA) which has brought a new lease of life to the lagoon.

The lake has numerous islands. The larger islands, separated by shallow channels, lie between the barrier and the main body of the lake. A total 42 km^{2} (16 sq mi) of channels connect the lake with Bay of Bengal. The six major islands are Parikud, Phulbari, Berahpura, Nuapara, Nalbana, and Tampara. These islands, together with the Peninsula of Malud, constitute the Krishnaprasad Revenue Block of Puri District.

The north shore of the lake is part of Khordha District and the western shore is part of Ganjam District. Due to siltation, the width of the barrier has fluctuated and the mouth to the sea has periodically been closed. The location of the mouth has also frequently shifted, generally towards the northeast. The mouth, which was 1.5 km (0.9 mi) wide in 1780, was only .75 km (0.5 mi) forty years later. The local fishermen, to maintain their livelihood, had to cut open the mouth to gain access to the sea for fishing.

Water depth of the lake varies from 0.9 to 2.6 ft (0.3 to 0.8 m) in the dry season to 5.9 to 13.8 ft (1.8 to 4.2 m) in the rainy season. The width of the old channel to the sea, now reported to be about 100 m (330 ft), is known as Magarmukha (Mouth of the Crocodile). The lake is divided into four separate zones namely, the southern, central, northern sectors and the outer channel area. A 32 km (19.9 mi) long outer channel connects the lake with the Bay of Bengal at Arakhuda village. The lake is pear-shaped and has a maximum length of 64.3 km (40.0 mi) with a mean width of 20.1 km (12.5 mi).

Another lake in India called Vembanad Lake is the longest lake (if the length is considered, 96.5 kilometres (60.0 mi) where the length of Chilika Lake is 64 kilometres (40 mi)) in India.

== Hydrology ==
Three hydrological subsystems control the hydrology of the lake. The land-based system comprises distributaries of the Mahanadi River on the northern side, 52 river channels from the western side and the Bay of Bengal on the eastern side. Two of the three southern branches of the Mahanadi River that trifurcates at Cuttack, feed the lake. 61% (850 m^{3}/s (30,000 cu ft/s)) of the total freshwater inflow into the lake is contributed by these two branches.

The second drainage system which is non–perennial accounts for 39% (536 cubic metres per second (18,900 cu ft/s)) of the inflow. The important rivers of this drainage system are the Kansari, Kusumi, Janjira, and Tarimi rivers. The annual total surface freshwater input to the lake is estimated to be 1.76 cubic kilometres (1,430,000 acre⋅ft) including direct precipitation over the lake contributing 0.87 cubic kilometres (710,000 acre⋅ft) All the inland river systems disgorge an annual flow of about 0.375 million cubic metres (304 acre⋅ft) of freshwater which is estimated to carry 13 million metric tons of silt into the lake. On the northeast, a channel connects the lake to the Bay of Bengal.

A tropical monsoon climate prevails over the drainage basin area of the lake. The lake experiences South–west and North-east monsoons during June to September and November to December respectively with an average annual rainfall of 1,238.8 mm (48.77 in), with 72 rainy days. The maximum temperature of 39.9 °C (103.8 °F) and minimum temperature of 14 °C (57.2 °F) have been recorded.

=== Sediment quality ===
The Chilika Development Authority (CDA) established an organized system of water quality measurements and limnological investigations indicating the following physico–chemical characteristics of the lake waters.

- Lake water is alkaline – pH ranging from 7.1 – 9.6 with total alkalinity matching the salinity. The southern part of the lake near Rambha has recorded the highest alkalinity.
- Bathymetry survey indicates extreme shallow depths in the northern sector, with less than 1.5 m (5 ft) in a large area. The southern sector of the lake has recorded the maximum depth of 3.9 m (12.8 ft)
- High turbidity due to strong mixing of overlying water with sediments is confirmed by observed transparency values ranging between 9 and 155 cm (0.30 and 5.09 ft).
- Salinity levels in the lake show wide temporal and spatial variation due to a complex blend of freshwater discharge, evaporation, wind condition and tidal inflow of seawater. The brackish nature of the lake is depicted by the 0 parts per thousand near the Daya River mouth to hyper-saline level of 42 ppt in the outlet channel during the dry period.
- The dissolved oxygen values were between 3.3–18.9 mg/L.
- Phosphate phosphorus (0–0.4 ppm), nitrate nitrogen (10–60 ppm) and silicates (1–8 ppm) are high in the north and northwest part of the lake where most of the rivers discharge into the lake with large amounts of silt and nutrients.
- The lake is broadly divided into four zones on the basis of salinity values, namely the southern, central, northern and outer channel. Tidal influx of seawater during monsoon is arrested by the strong influx of a large amount of fresh water from the northern and central zones. Brackish water conditions in the southern zone, even during monsoon, prevail due to low water exchange. Salinity in the southern zone decreases during the post-monsoon period and in winter as northern winds facilitate mixing of water with rest of the lake. During the summer, intrusion of salt water from the outer channel into the lake increases since water level of the lake is at its lowest level. A general increase in salinity of the central and northern zones occurs due to wind-induced mixing by the predominantly southern winds and salinity in the southern zone does not rise appreciably.

=== Sedimentation ===
Adverse tidal exchange occurred due to the littoral drift along the coast line causing flow reduction and shifting of the lake mouth every year. Estimated sediment transport due to this is on the order of 100,000 metric tons. This adverse effect needed ameliorative actions.

Sediment cores were collected from different locations of the lake. The result indicated spatial variation of sedimentation rate in three zones of the lake of 7.6 millimetres (0.30 in)/year (Northern Sector), 8.0 millimetres (0.31 in)/year (Central Sector) and 2.8 millimetres (0.11 in)/year (Southern Sector). The non–uniform sedimentation rate along with the porosity and water content of the sediment cores were also analysed which indicated the lake had different deposition zones, with comparatively higher sedimentation rate in Northern and Central Sector and a slow rate in the Southern Sector.

== Conservation – threats and management ==
In 1971, during Indira Gandhi's tenure as Prime Minister of India, Chilika Lake was designated the first Indian wetland of international importance under the Ramsar Convention due to its rich biodiversity as shown by the facts that:

- Over a million migratory waterfowl and shorebirds winter here.
- Over 400 vertebrate species have been recorded.
- As an estuarine lagoon, it supports a unique assemblage of marine, brackish and freshwater species.
- Several rare and endangered species are found in the region.
- The lake supports fisheries that are the lifeline of the community.
- The lake is of great value in preserving genetic diversity.
- There is an Increase in weeds and aquaculture activities.

=== Threats ===
Over the years, the ecosystem of the lake encountered several problems and threats such as:

- Siltation due to littoral drift and sediments from the inland river systems
- Shrinkage of water surface area
- Choking of the inlet channel as well as shifting of the mouth connecting to the sea
- Decrease in salinity and fishery resources
- Proliferation of freshwater invasive species
- An overall loss of biodiversity with decline in productivity adversely affecting the livelihood of the community that depended on it
- Fights between fishermen and non-fishermen communities about fishing rights in the lake and consequent court cases

The expansion of commercial aquaculture of prawn has contributed to the decline of the lakes fisheries and bird population.

Concerted action was initiated by the Odisha State Government with support from the Government of India to adopt adaptive conservation and management actions.

By 1993, the problems in Chilika were severe that the lake was put under "The Montreux Record" as the lake was considered to have "undergone, to be undergoing, or to be likely to undergo change in its ecological character brought about by human action". The purpose was to stimulate remedial measures for the lake's conservation, supplemented with adequate monitoring. It was expected that such an action would benefit from the advice from Ramsar Advisory Mission and other identified technical assistance programs.

In summary, siltation from upstream led to shrinkage of the water surface area, decrease of salinity and growth of invasive freshwater aquatic weed infestation, all of which had a negative impact on the habitat of wildlife and fishery resources.

=== Chilika Development Authority (CDA) ===
In 1992, the Government of Odisha, concerned by the degradation of the lake's ecosystem and cognizant of significant numbers of people who were dependent upon the lake's resources, set up the CDA. The CDA was set up for restoration and overall development of the lake under the Indian Societies Registration Act as a parastatal body under the administrative jurisdiction of the Forest and Environment Department, with the following charter:

- To protect the Lake ecosystem with all its genetic diversity
- To formulate the management plan for Integrated Resource Management and wise use of the lake's resources by the community depending on it
- To execute multidimensional and multidisciplinary developmental activities either itself or through other agencies
- To collaborate with various national and international institutions for development of the lake

The governing body of the Authority is headed by the Chief Minister of Odisha State and has people's representatives (Members of Parliament and Legislative Assembly), representatives of the fisherfolk communities and secretaries of the key departments, experts and eminent scientists as its members.

In 1998, an executive committee constituted with financial authority, supplemented with financial support from the Tenth and Eleventh Finance Commissions of the Government of India, gave support to the management initiatives taken up by CDA. This facilitated a coordinated approach to plan and implement effective ameliorative management actions.

An Integrated Management Plan was implemented with financial support of Rs 570 million (US$12.7 million) out of "special problem grants" recommended by the Finance Commissions. Hydrobiological monitoring was supported under the Odisha Water Resources Consolidation Project of the World Bank, to the extent of Rs 10 million (US$220,000). A strong support network was created with 7 state government organizations, 33 NGOs, 3 national government ministries, 6 other organizations, 11 international organizations, 13 research institutions and 55 different categories of community groups.

In 2003, a collaboration of Indian and Japanese experts led to a friendly relationship between Chilika lake and Saroma Lake in Japan called Sister Wetlands.

=== Ameliorative actions ===
Considering the threats faced by the lake, the national wetlands, mangroves and coral reefs committee of the Ministry of Environment & Forests, Government of India, also identified the lake as a priority site for conservation and management. The ameliorative actions were taken by the CDA to restore the ecosystem and to improve the socio-economic conditions of the communities living around the lake and on its islands involved the following.

- Opening the lake mouth

The effective ameliorative action was the hydrological intervention of opening the new lake mouth and channel to the sea through the barrier beach at Satapura. This improved the spatial and temporal salinity gradients of the lake to maintain the unique characteristics of an estuarine eco-system. This intervention was undertaken after detailed scientific studies, including 3-dimensional mathematical modeling and hydraulics studies on a model prototype, were carried out by the Central Water and Power Research Station, Pune and National Institute of Oceanography, Goa. In September 2000, the desiltation of the channel connecting the lake to the sea and opening of a new mouth to restore the natural flows of water and salinity levels was carried out. These actions resulted in a notable increase in the lake's fish yield and a reduction of freshwater weeds. The new mouth reduced the length of the outflow channel by 18 kilometres (11 mi). Opening of the new mouth provided a favorable increased salinity regime throughout the lake with less fluctuations and improved water clarity.

Other measures included:

- Catchments management in "participatory micro-watershed management in a whole ecosystem approach".
- Protection of bird habitat and of bird species.
- Economic incentives to the local population to stop poaching of birds.
- Measures to improve the socio–economic conditions, such as training programmes to develop eco-tourism.
- Provision of solar streetlight systems to island villages.
- Development of a ferry service for isolated villages.
- Construction of landing facilities for fisherfolk, as well as education and environmental awareness activities.

In 2002, Chilika was taken out of the Montreux Record, in light of the improved conditions of the lake. Chilika lake is the first Ramsar site in Asia to be removed from the Montreux record.

=== Awards ===
- In November 2002, the Ramsar Wetland Conservation Award was presented to the Chilika Development Authority for "outstanding achievements in the field of restoration and wise use of wetlands and effective participation of local communities in these activities".
- The Indira Gandhi Paryavaran Puruskar, constituted by the Ministry of Environment and Forests, Government of India awarded the prestigious Indira Gandhi Paryavaran Award–2002 to the Chilika Development Authority for the outstanding contribution of conservation and restoration of the Chilika lake eco-system.

== Flora and fauna ==
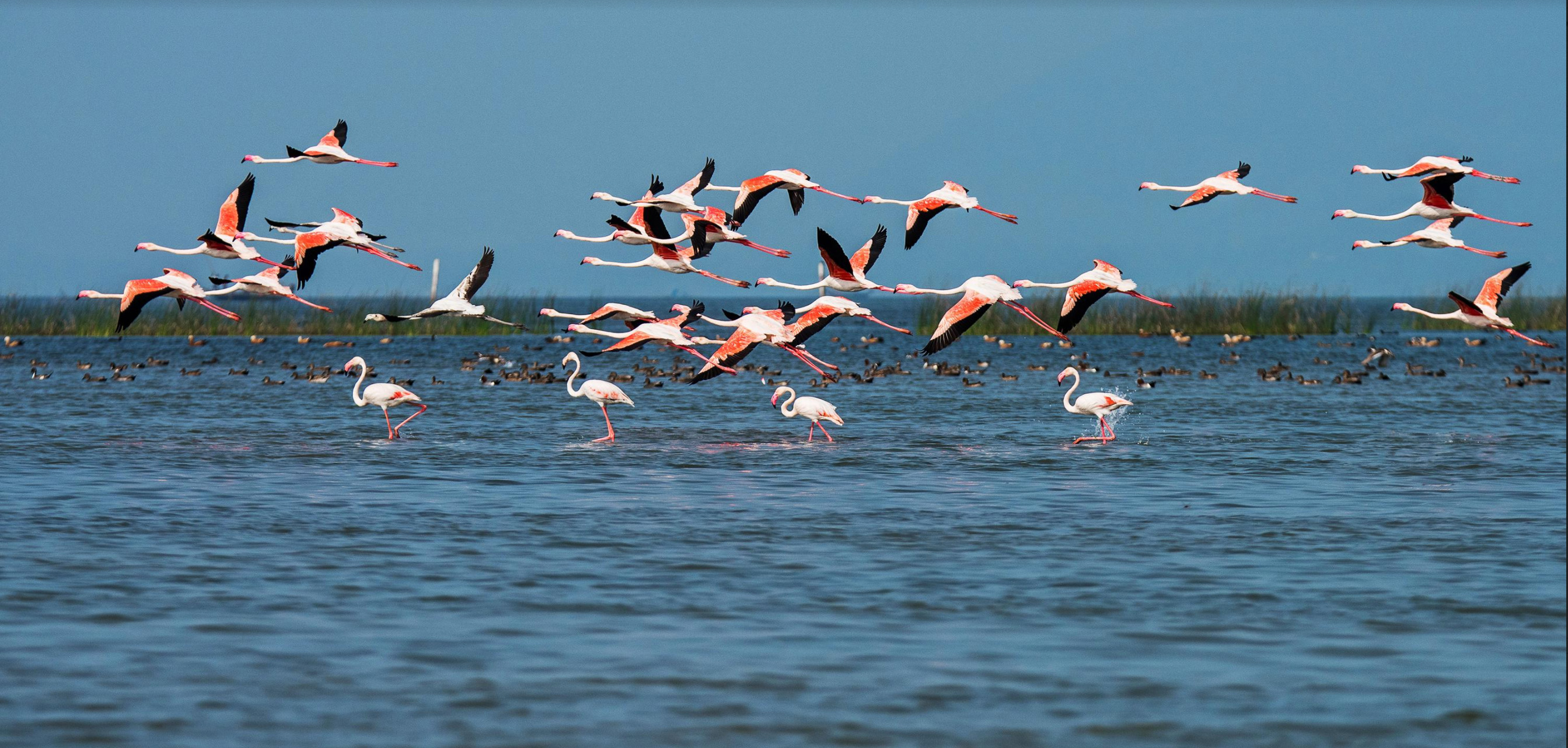
Migratory birds at Chilika lake

The ecological richness of the lake is of value in preserving the genetic diversity because of the multiplicity of its habitat, flora and fauna (see photo gallery). The Zoological Survey of India (ZSI) surveyed the lake between 1985 and 1988 and identified 800 animal species, including many rare, endangered and vulnerable species, but excluding terrestrial insects.

The threatened animal species identified are green sea turtle (EN), dugong (VU), Irrawaddy dolphin (EN), blackbuck (NT), Spoon billed sandpiper (CR), Chilika limbless skink (CR) and fishing cat (VU). 24 mammalian species were reported. 37 species of reptiles and amphibians are also reported.

=== Flora ===
Recent surveys revealed 726 species of flowering plants belonging to 496 genera and 120 families. This represents about one fourth of the vascular plant species of the Odisha state where some 2900 species altogether are found. The flora is dominated by aquatic and sub-aquatic plants with Fabaceae as the dominant plant family followed by Poaceae and Cyperaceae. Certain species were found to be characteristic of specific islands. Important species identified are:

- Leguminosae, Poaceae, and Cyperaceae
- Endemic Cassipourea ceylanica
- Five species of seagrass
- Wild plants of horticultural importance and interesting plant groups such as insectivorous plants, epiphytes, parasites and lithophytes
- Mangrove associates, such as Aegiceras corniculatus, Excoecaria agalloch, Salvadora persica, Pongamia pinnata, Colubrina asiatica, Capparis roxburghii, Macrotyloma ciliatum and many others.

=== Fauna ===
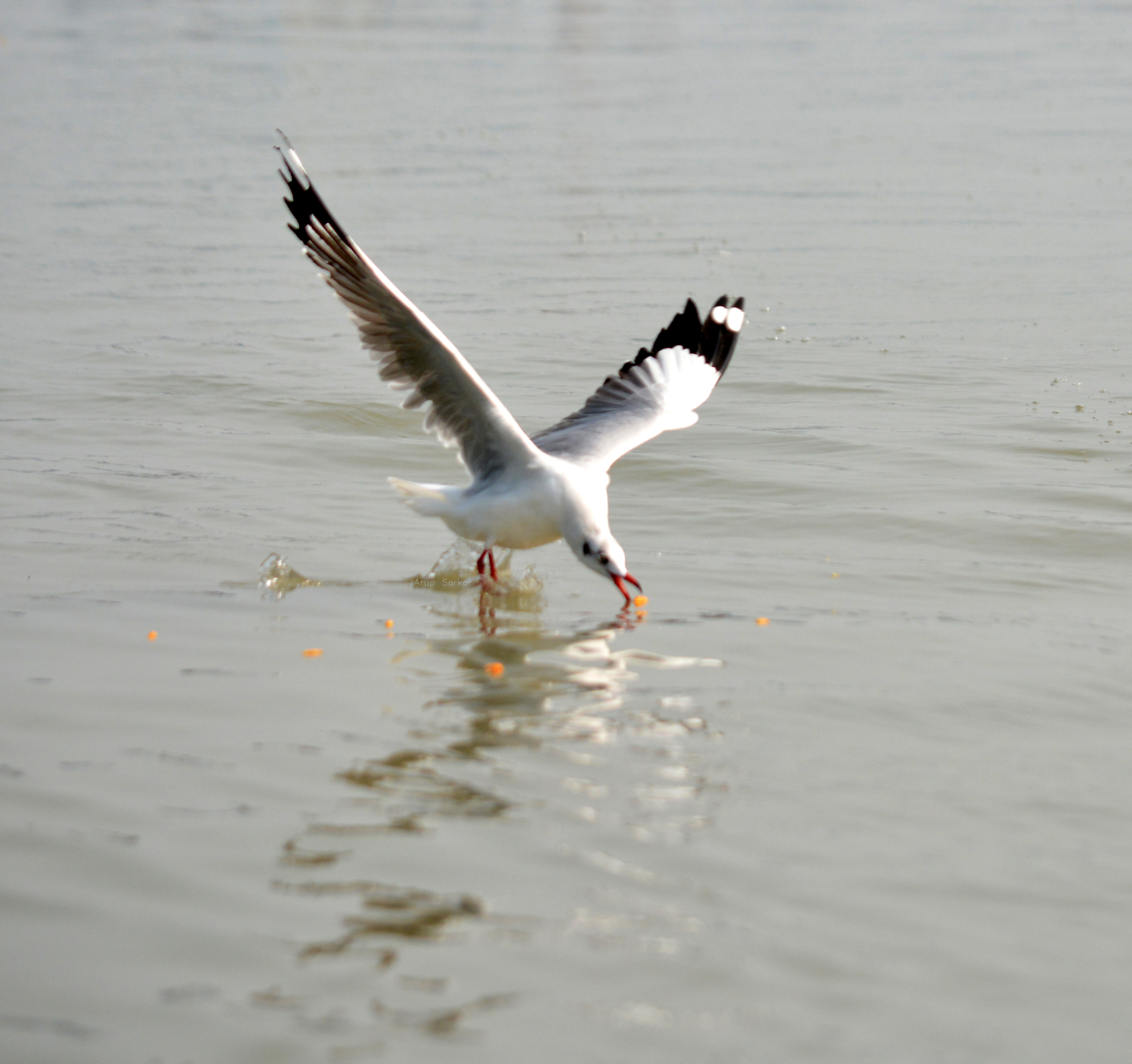
Brown-headed Gull (Chroicocephalus brunnicephalus)

Chilika Lake is the largest wintering ground for migratory birds, on the Indian sub-continent. The lake is home to a number of threatened species of plants and animals. It is one of the hotspots of biodiversity in the country. Some species listed in the IUCN Red List of threatened animals inhabit the lake for at least part of their life cycle.

The lagoon hosts over 160 species of birds in the peak migratory season. Birds from as far as the Caspian Sea, Lake Baikal, Aral Sea and other remote parts of Russia, Kirghiz steppes of Kazakhstan, Central and southeast Asia, Ladakh and Himalayas come here. These birds travel great distances; some of them possibly travel as much as 12,000 kilometres (7,500 mi) to reach Chilika Lake.

Birds like white-bellied sea eagles, greylag geese, purple moorhen, jacana, flamingos, egrets, grey and purple heron, Indian roller, storks, white ibis, spoonbills, brahminy ducks, shovellers, pintails, and more are found here.

Migratory waterfowl arrive here from as far as the Caspian Sea, Baikal Lake and remote parts of Russia, Mongolia, Ladakh, Siberia, Iran, Iraq, Afghanistan and from the Himalayas. A census conducted in the winter of 1997-98 recorded about 2 million birds in the lake.

According to a survey, 45 percent of the birds are terrestrial in nature, 32 percent are waterfowl, and 23 percent are waders. The lagoon is also home to 14 types of raptors. Around 152 rare and endangered Irrawaddy dolphins have also been reported. Plus, the lagoon supports about 37 species of reptiles and amphibians.

In 2007, nearly 840,000 birds visited the lake, out of which 198,000 were spotted in Nalbana Island. On 5 Jan 2008, a bird census involving 85 wildlife officials counted 900,000 birds of which 450,000 were sighted in Nalabana. Removal of invasive species of freshwater aquatic plants, especially water hyacinth, due to restoration of salinity, is a contributing factor for the recent increasing attraction of birds to the lake.

Nalbana Bird Sanctuary

Nalbana Island is the core area of the Ramsar designated wetlands of Chilika Lake. Nalbana means a weed-covered island In the Odia language. It is a major island in the center of the lake and has an area of 15.53 km^{2} (6.00 sq mi). The island gets submerged during the monsoon season. As the monsoon recedes in the winter, lake levels decrease and the island is exposed, birds flock to the island in large numbers to feed on its extensive mudflats. Nalbana was notified in 1987 and declared a bird sanctuary in 1973 under the Wildlife Protection Act.

=== Aqua fauna ===
As per the Chilika Development Authority's (CDA) updated data (2002), 323 aquatic species, which includes 261 fish species, 28 prawns and 34 crabs are reported out of which sixty five species breed in the lake. 27 species are freshwater fishes and two genera of prawns. The remaining species migrate to the sea to breed. 21 species of herrings and sardines of the family Clupeidae are reported.

Microalgae, marine seaweeds, sea grasses, fish and crab also flourish in the brackish water of the Chilika Lagoon. Recovery of seagrass beds in recent years is a welcoming trend which may eventually result in re-colonization of endangered dugongs.

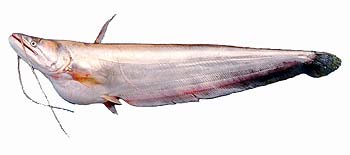
Wallago attu – A common type of fish in the lake

Between 1998–2002, 40 fish species were recorded here for the first time and following the reopening of the lake mouth in 2000, six threatened species have reappeared, including:

- Milk fish (Seba khainga),
- Indo-Pacific tarpon (Panialehio),
- Ten pounder (Nahama),
- Bream (Kala khuranti),
- Hilsa (Tenuealosa) ilisha (ilishi) and
- Mullet R. corsula (Kekenda)

Commercial fisheries

The lake is an ecosystem with large fishery resources. It sustains more than 150,000 fisher–folk living in 132 villages on the shore and islands. For centuries, fisher folk evolved exclusive rights of fishing through a complex system of partitioning the fisheries of the lake and developed a range of fishing techniques, nets and gear.

During the British rule, in 1897–98, fishermen community enjoyed exclusive fisheries rights in the lake. The fisheries of the lake were part of the Zamindari estates of Khallikote, Parikud, Suna Bibi, Mirza Taher Baig and the Chaudhary families of Bhungarpur and the Khas Mahal areas of Khurda, lying within the kingdoms of the Rajas of Parikud and Khallikote. The zamindars (Landlords) leased out the fisheries exclusively to the local fisherfolk.

With the abolition of zamindari (land lordship) system in 1953, traditional fishing areas continued to be leased out to cooperatives of local fishermen. Fishing, particularly, prawn fishing, became remunerative with outside interest playing an important role. But in 1991, when the government of Odisha proposed a leasing policy that would have resulted in the auction of leases to the highest bidder, the Fishermen's cooperatives challenged the order in court. The High Court of Odisha ordered the Government to enact changes that would protect the interests of traditional fishermen and since then no new leases have been reported. This has resulted in a chaotic regime in which powerful vested interests from outside dominate, and the local people have been subordinated.

Butter catfish and Wallago attu are the most common type of fish found in the lake. 11 species of fish, 5 species of prawn and 2 crab species are commercially important. The commercially important prawn are giant tiger prawn (Metapenaeus monoceros), Indian prawn (Penaeus indicus), Metapenaeus monoceros (Speckled shrimp), Metapenaeus affinis (Pink prawn) and Metapenaeus dobson (Kadal shrimp). Mangrove crab is an important commercial crab. Fish landings in the lake, which fluctuated in the past, have recorded a remarkable recovery after the opening of the new mouth and dredging of silt –choked old mouth Magarmukh in 2000–2001, resulted in a better intermixing of the tidal influx from the sea and freshwater inflow from rivers. Against an all time lowest landing of fish and prawn of 1,269 t (1,399 short tons) in 1995–96, the all-time high is reported to be 11,878 t (13,093 short tons) during 2001–2002 resulting in an estimated per capita income for the fisher folk of Rs 19,575 (about US$392) during the year. Recently, the Government of Odisha have issued a notification banning the lease of Chilika Lake for Culture Fishery.

Dolphins

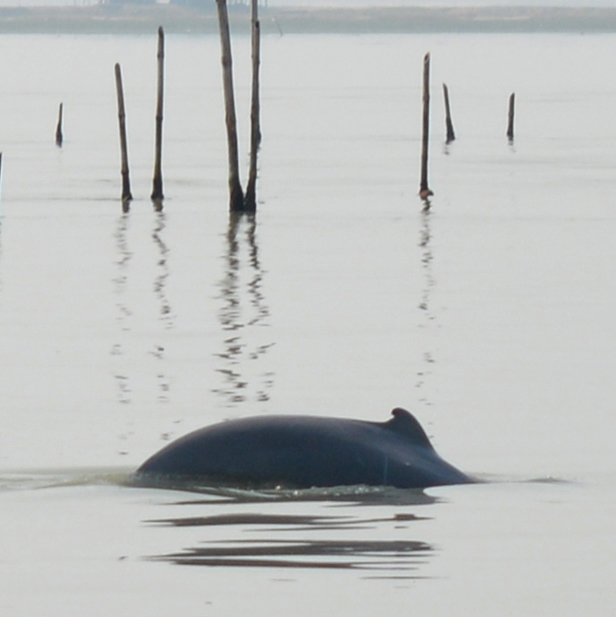
Dolphin of Chilika

The Irrawaddy dolphin (Orcaella brevirostris) is the flagship species of Chilika lake. Chilika is home to the only known population of Irrawaddy dolphins in India and one of only two lagoons in the world that are home to this species.

It is classified as Endangered according to International Union for Conservation of Nature(IUCN).

A small population of Bottlenose dolphins, also migrate into the lagoon from the sea. Chilika fishermen state that when Irrawaddy dolphins and bottlenose dolphins meet in the outer channel, the former get frightened and are forced to return toward the lake.

Some Irrawaddy dolphins used to be sighted only along the inlet channel and in a limited portion of the central sector of the lake. After the opening of the new mouth at Satapada in 2000, they are now well distributed in the central and the southern sector of the lake. The number of dolphins sighted has varied from 50 to 170. A 2006 census counted 131 dolphins and the 2007 census revealed 138 dolphins. Out of the 138 dolphins, 115 were adults, 17 adolescents and six calves. 60 adults were spotted in the outer channel followed by 32 in the central sector and 23 in the southern sector.

Dolphin tourism provides an important alternative source of income for many local residents. There are four tourist associations in Satapada employing three hundred and sixty 9-HP long-tail motor boats taking tourists to a 25 km^{2} (9.7 sq mi) area of the lake for dolphin watching. About 500 fishing families are involved in this business. The Odisha Tourism Department and the Dolphin Motorboat Association, an NGO at Satpada, report about 40,000 tourists visit Chilika every year for dolphin watching. October–January, and May–June are the peak season for tourists at Chilika, with a maximum 600-700 per day during December–January. The Dolphin Motorboat Association has 75 8-passenger motorboats for dolphin watching. Tourists pay Rs. 250 for 60–90 minutes per trip(approx ₹4k for 10 people with 3.5 hours in a private boat in 2018). Besides the association, the Odisha Tourism Department organises "dolphin-watch" for tourists. Even during monsoon, about 100 tourists/day visit the lake.

Boat based dolphin watching tours impact dolphin behavior and cause several accidental dolphin deaths each year. CDA conducts an annual census of dolphin deaths. They report 15 deaths in 2003–04, 11 in 2004–05, 8 in 2005-06 and 5 in 2006–07. 40% of the 2006-07 deaths were by mechanised boats.

Since 2004, the Whale and Dolphin Conservation Society has been conducting a science-based community education project to conserve the Irrawaddy dolphins and Chilika Lake. They have determined the primary cause of mortality for this population of dolphins is floating gill nets and hook line fisheries and the secondary cause is boat strikes from increasing unmanaged tourism activities.

The Irrawaddy dolphins have a mutualistic relationship of co-operative fishing with the traditional fishermen. Fishermen recall when they would call out to the dolphins, to drive fish into their nets. Castnet fishing with the help of Irrawaddy dolphins in upper reaches of the Ayeyawady River has been documented.

== Major attractions ==
The 15 km^{2} Nalaban Island is within the Lagoon and is the core area of the Ramsar designated wetlands. It was declared a bird sanctuary under the Wildlife Protection Act in 1973. It is the heart of the park where one can see thousands of birds descending during the migratory season. The island disappears during monsoon season due to inundation, and post-monsoon, the island emerges again.

The lake harbours 225 species of fish, a variety of phytoplankton, algae and aquatic plants, and also supports over 350 species of non-aquatic plants. The other areas where high concentrations of birds are recorded are Gerasara, Parikud Island, and the western shores of the northern sector.

== Eco-tourism ==
The open air and scenic natural flora and fauna of the lake are an attraction for eco-tourism. This is expected to provide a degree of alternate employment to the local community and generate environmental awareness, among local residents as well as visitors, about the conservation and wise use of the lake's natural resources. The locations within the lake identified for such activity are:

- Rambha Bay at the southern end of the lake with the group of islands including:
  - The Becon Island, with an architectural conical pillar (to put a light on the top) built by Mr. Snodgrass, the then collector of Ganjam of the East India Company, on a mass of rock in the Rambha Bay near Ghantasila hill. It has scenic water spread surrounded by the Eastern Ghat.
  - The Breakfast Island, pear-shaped, known as "Sankuda island", with remnants of a dilapidated bungalow constructed by the king of Kalikote, has rare plants and is full of greenery with appealing flora.
  - Honeymoon Island, 5 km (3 mi) from Rambha Jetty, known as Barkuda Island, with clear waters has abundant red and green macro algae in the bed is also known for the limbless lizard, an endemic species found here.
- Somolo and Dumkudi islands, located in the Central and Southern sectors of the lake, in the backdrop of scenic Khalikote hill range, are inundated remnants of the Eastern Ghats with rich flora and fauna and also known for sighting of Irrawaddy dolphins.
- Birds' island, located in the southern sector of the lake has huge exposed hanging rocks, are painted white due to folic acid of the droppings of the birds and is known for rich algal communities and few mangrove species and also migratory birds in winter.
- Parikud is a group of composite islands in the Garh Krishnaprasad Block for nature lovers and provides an avian spectacle during winter season
- Kalijai Temple located on an island is considered to be the abode of the Goddess Kalijai. This temple is located at a hill which is surrounded by blue water bears. Local people of Chilika refer to goddess as the reigning deity of the lagoon
- Satapada village, at the new mouth of the lake, provides a view of the Lake and also views of the dolphins. Hundreds of boats here provide tours of the lake for tourists.
- Barunkuda, a small island situated near Magarmukh, the mouth of the lake, has a temple of Lord Varuna.
- Nabagraha is an ancient deity located along the outer channel.
- Chourbar Shiva Temple is located near Alupatna village, along the outer channel.
- Manikapatna, located on the outer channel has historical evidence of a port which was used for trade with Far East and also has the Bhabakundeswar temple of Lord Shiva, an old Mosque whose entrance door is made of the jaws of the whale.
- Sand-Bar and Mouth of the Lake is a striking and un-explored stretch of 30 km (20 mi) of empty beach across the sand bar which separates the Lake from the sea.
- Mangalajodi a famous bird sanctuary for sighting migratory birds.

== Tourist trap and scam reports ==
Recently Chilika Lake has gathered a reputation to be a tourist trap where a number of individuals run pearl and gemstone scams.

== Access ==
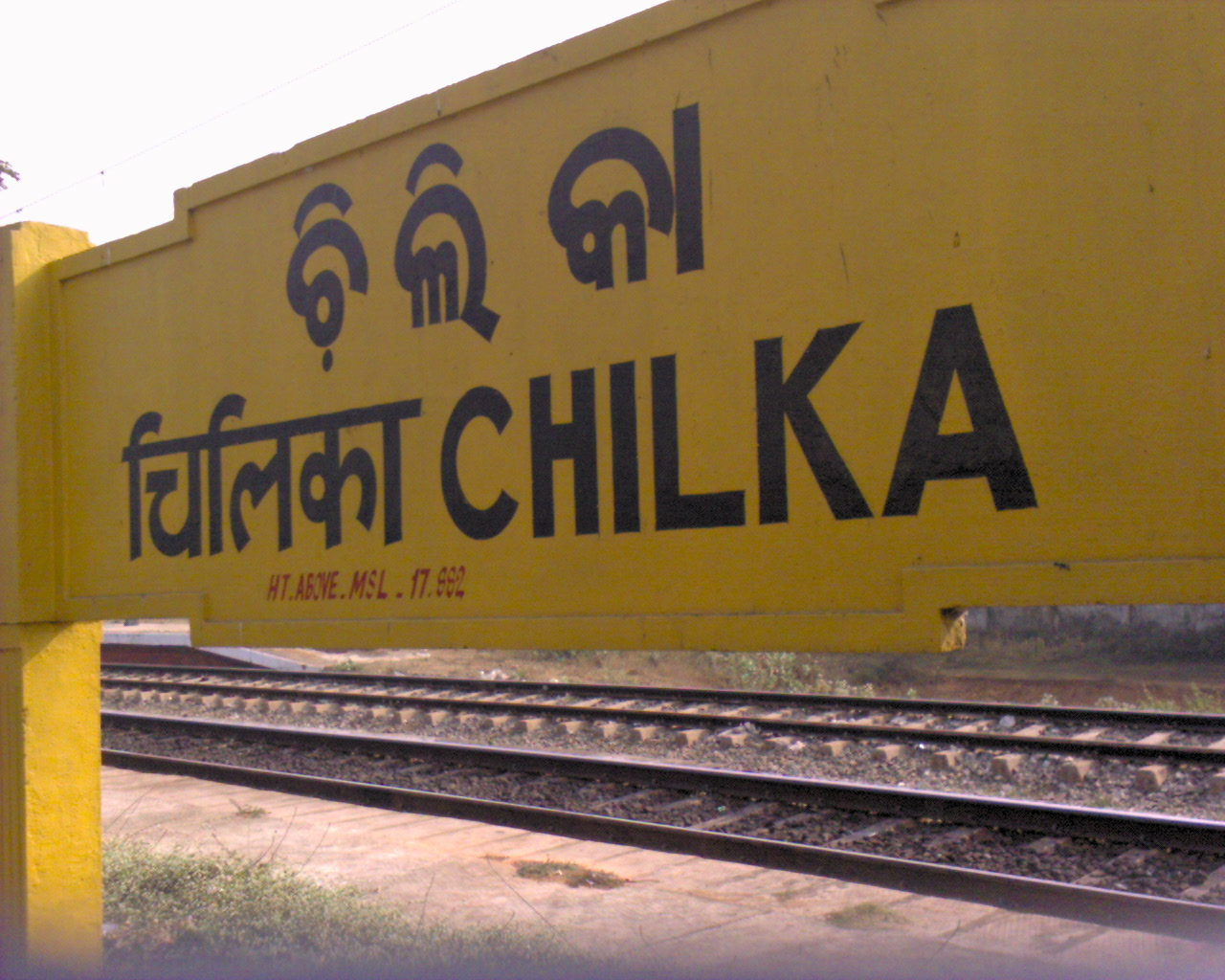
Chilika railway station

The lake is connected by road to Chennai and Kolkata through National Highway No 16. Satpada town on the eastern bank of the lake is about 50 km (30 mi) by road southwest of the city of Puri and at a distance of 100 km (60 mi) from Bhubaneswar, the capital of Odisha, which is also the nearest airport.

A broad-gauge railway line of the South Eastern Railway from Kolkata skirts along the western bank of the lake passing through Balugaon, Chilika and Rambha stations.

Within the lake precincts, Odisha Tourism Development Corporation Ltd. (OTDC) and the Revenue Department of the state government offer boat cruises. Private operators also provide country boats on hire to various islands in the lake.

There are OTDC Guest houses at Barkul, Rambha, Satapada & several hotels at Balugaon. Before entering into the Nalbana Bird Sanctuary one has to obtain an entry permit. The entry permit has to be produced at entry/exit points, at check gates as and whenever requested by officials.

== Published accounts ==
=== Film ===
Akanksha Damini Joshi's film, Chilika Bank$ (2008) tells the story via a banyan tree on the banks of lake Chilika tracing the ecological changes in the lake over four decades. From 1970s, when it was exposed to poaching by the outsiders, through 1980s when the lake was over-fished, to 1990s when the aqua culture ponds became a common sight, and finally the first decade of the 21st century when the environmental interference that was made to protect the lake ended up becoming its greatest threat.

Joshi's film maps the destruction of the lake and its abuse for the past four decades. The locals have been looted of their life support system with migration now being their only recourse. The film provides account of how uncontrolled human intervention has turned the lake, which was a sustainable livelihood resource, into a mere waterbody that tourists can dip their feet into.

The film produced by Public Service Broadcasting Trust was honored with the Livelihood Award at the CMS Vatavaran Environment and Wildlife Film Festival, New Delhi in 2009. It was recipient of the First Prize at Jeevika, South Asia Documentary Film Festival. Chilika Bank$ was screened in the Indian Panorama section of the 40th International Film Festival of India (IFFI), Goa 2009 in the non-feature film category. The film has garnered multiple television screenings on India's public broadcaster, Doordarshan's various channels.

The film was an Official Selection at the Film South Asia, Kathmandu in 2009, the Rodos EcoFilms International Festival,Greece in 2010 and the 4th Samsung Women's International Film Festival, Chennai in 2011.

Chilika Banks is displayed in various renowned university libraries like the Harvard University, Washington University, Duke University, Emory University and Syracuse University; and the Library of Congress, de facto the National Library of United States of America.

== Gallery ==
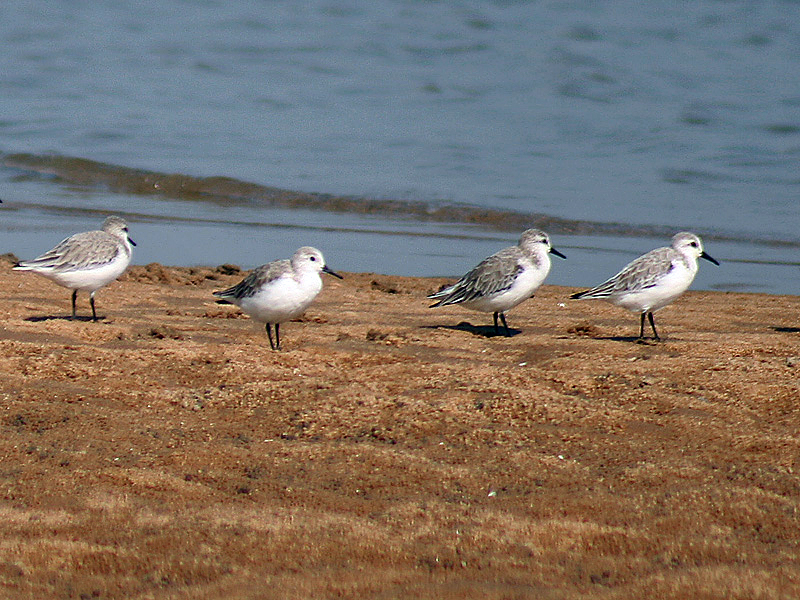
Sanderling, Calidris alba

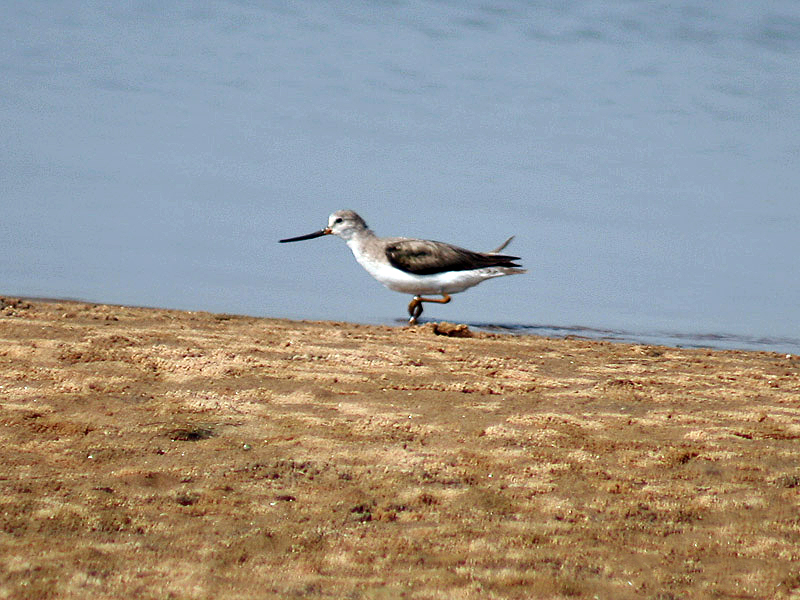
Terek sandpiper, Xenus cinereus

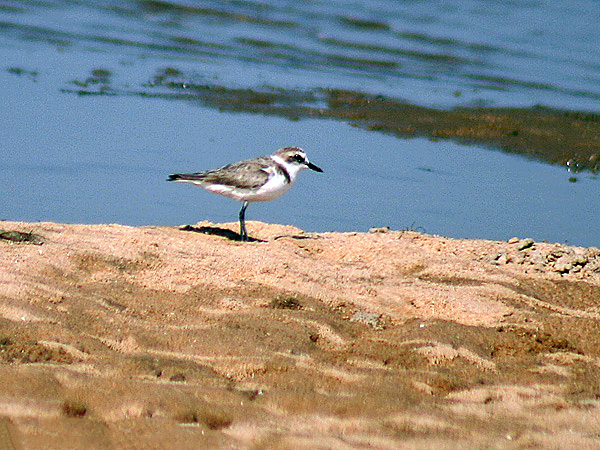
Kentish plover, Charadrius alexandrinus

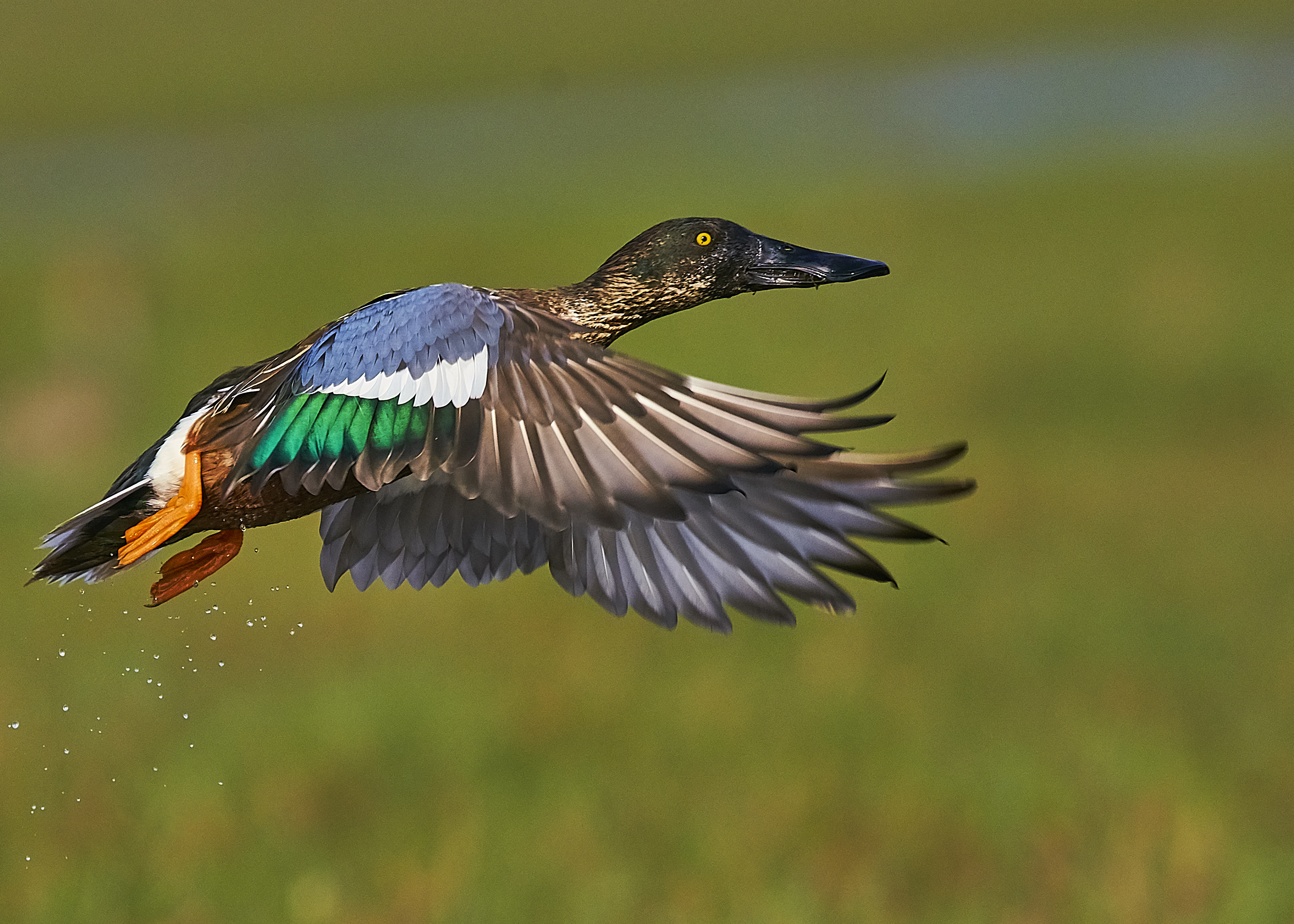
Northern shoveler, Spatula clypeata

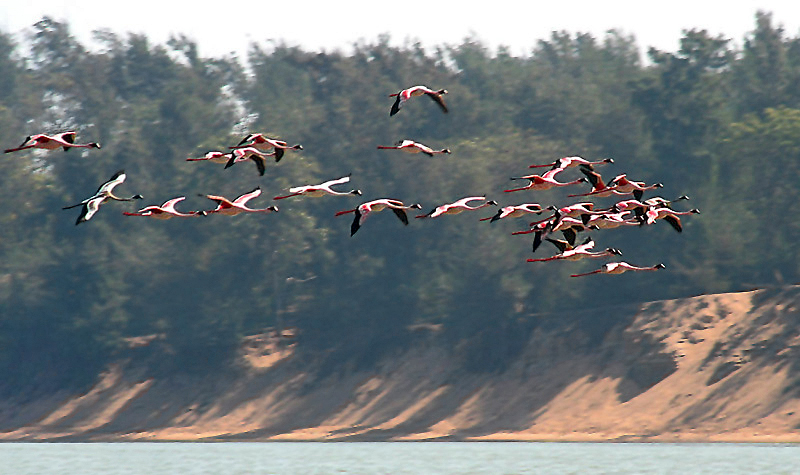
Lesser Flamingos, Phoenicopterus minor

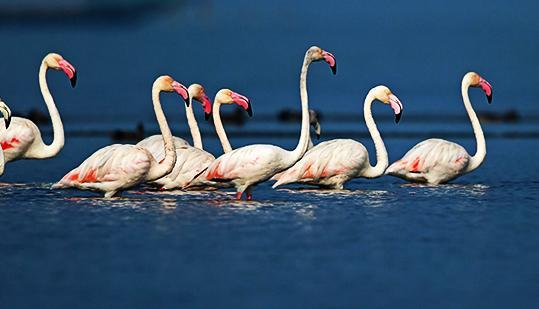
Migratory Flamingos at Chilika

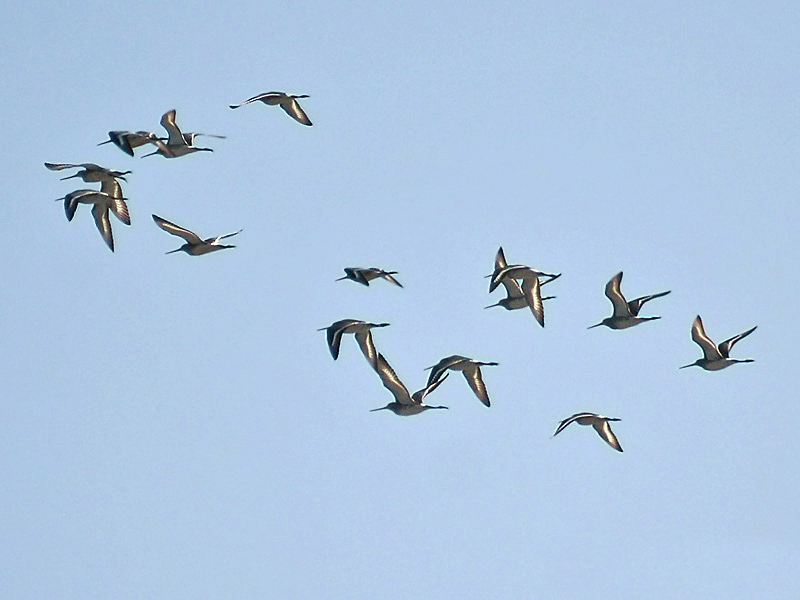
Black-tailed godwit, Limosa limosa

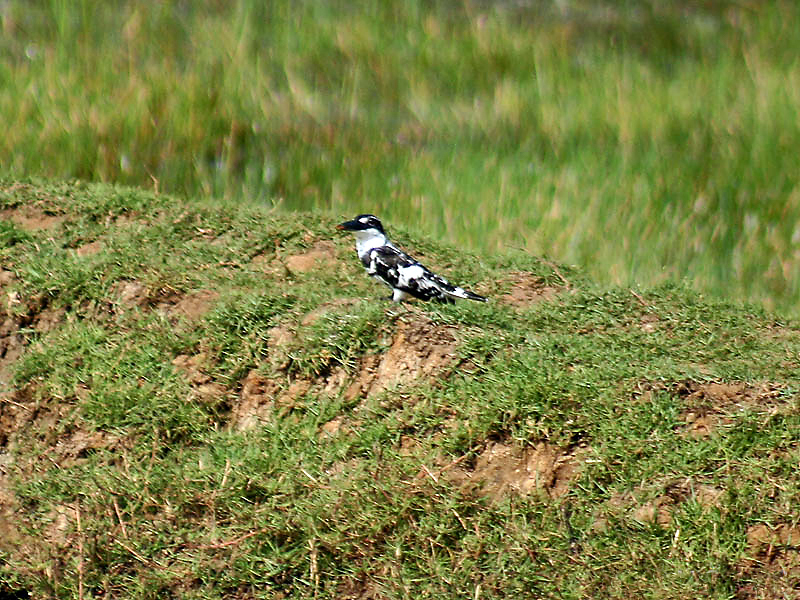
Pied kingfisher, Ceryle rudis

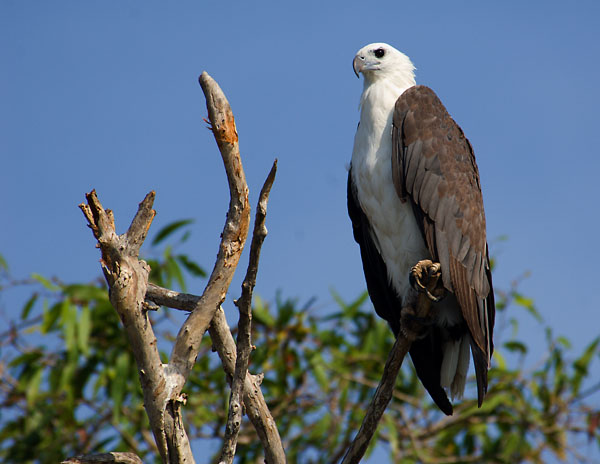
White-bellied sea eagle

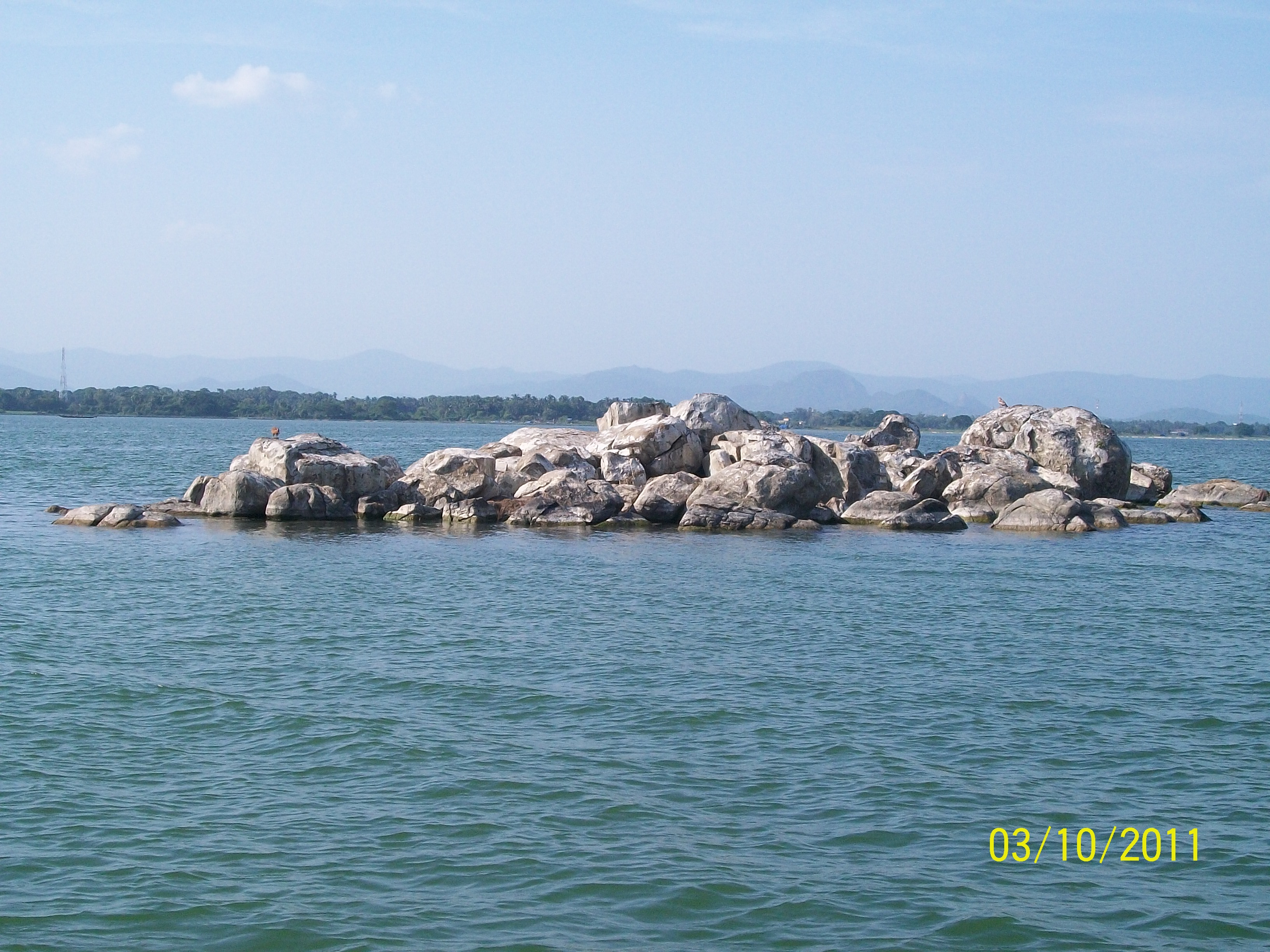
Parikuda Island

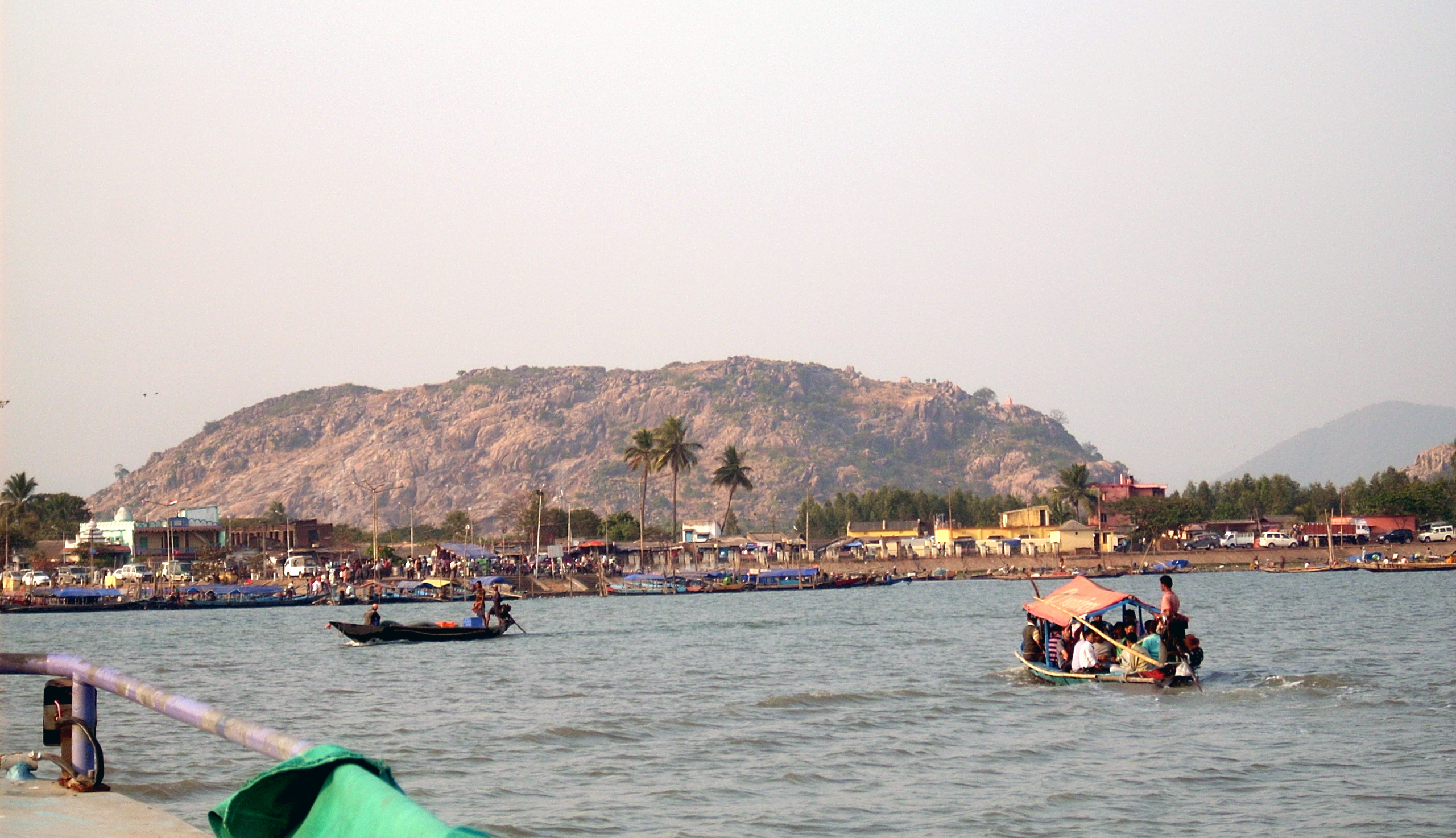
Balugaon

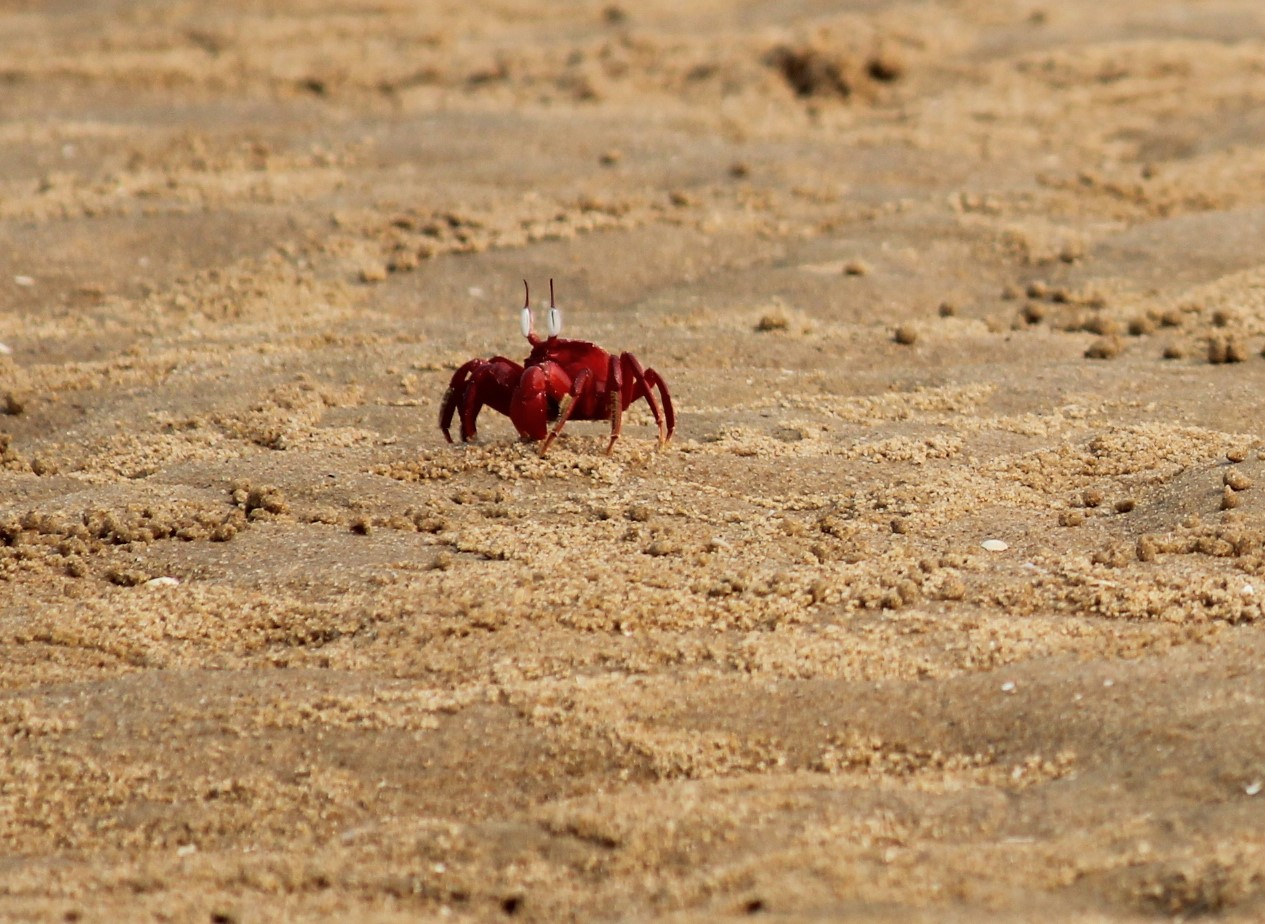
Red Crab at Chilika

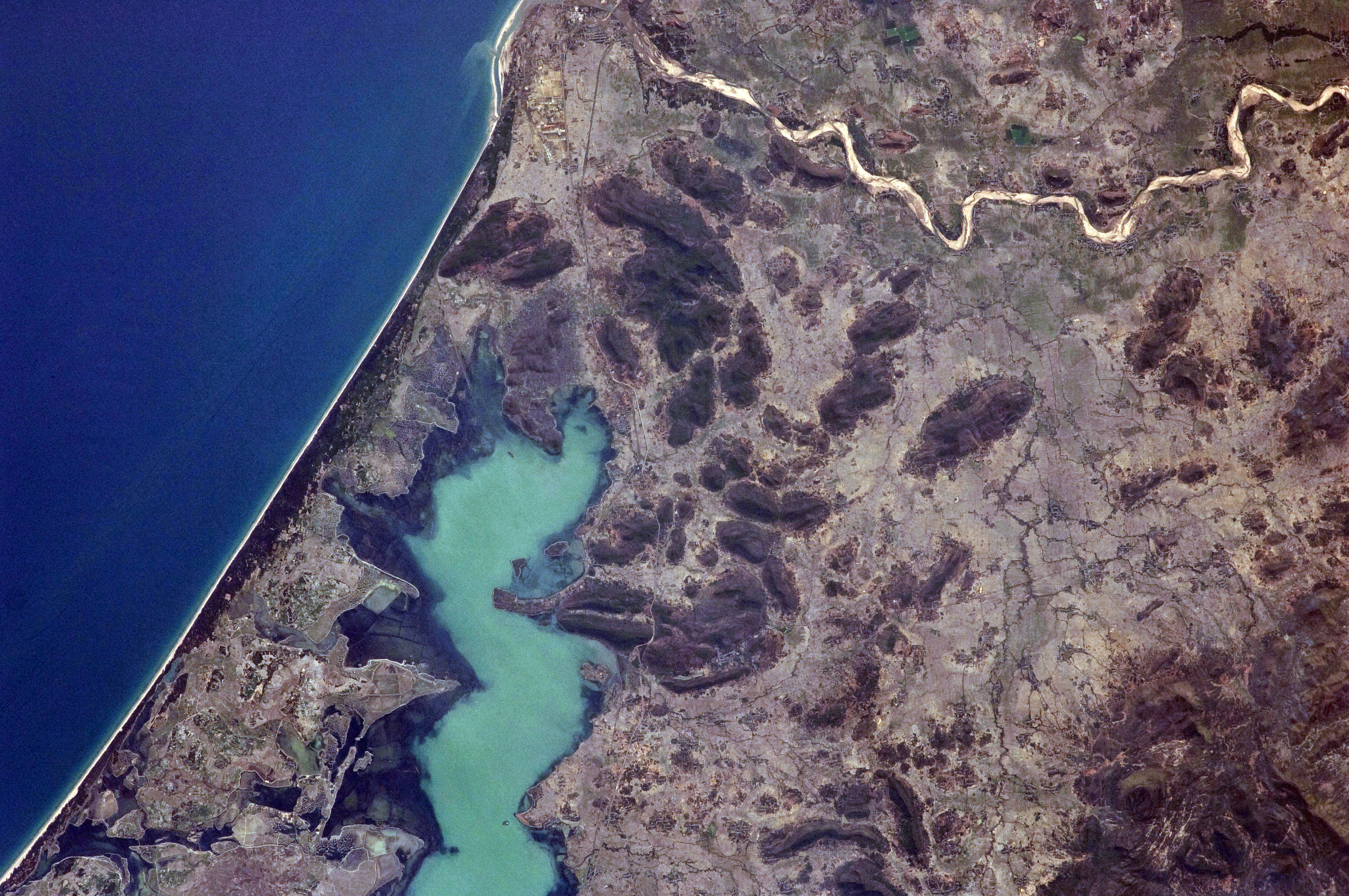
Aerial satellite imagery of Chilika lake
