= Gop, Odisha =

Gop
- Village
- Location in Odisha, India Gop (India)
- Coordinates: 19.98°N 86.01°E
- Country: India
- State: Odisha
- District: Puri
- Elevation: 5 m (16 ft)

Languages
  - Official: Odia
- Time zone: UTC+5:30 (IST)
- Vehicle registration: OD
- Website: odisha.gov.in

Gop (also known as "Gope") is a Village and a Grama Panchayat in the Puri district of the Indian state of Odisha.

== Geography ==
Gop is located at 20.00°N 86.01°E. It has an average elevation of 6 metres (20 ft).

Gop is famous for the Sun temple, Kathiawar (5th and 6th century AD) comprises square sanctum circumscribed by double courtyards. The important places like Biratunga, Begunia, Nimapara, Nagapur, Kakatpur, Bhaimapur, Ganeswarpur, Kusabhadra surround Gop.

It is about thirty kilometres from Puri, at the junction where the Konark road branches from the Bhubaneswar-to-Puri road.

== Politics ==
Gop is part of Jagatsinghpur (Lok Sabha constituency).

== See also ==
- Kushabhadra River
- Ganeswarpur
- Swami Nigamananda
- Basudeipur Sub Village
- Konark
