= Ganeswarpur =

- Village
- Location in Odisha, India
- Coordinates: 19.97°N 86.01°E
- Country: India
- State: Odisha
- District: Puri

Population
  - Total: 1,800

Languages
  - Official: Odia
- Time zone: UTC+5:30 (IST)
- PIN: 752110
- Telephone code: 06758
- Vehicle registration: OD-13
- Nearest city: Puri
- Sex ratio: 60% male 40% female ♂/♀
- Literacy: 90%
- Lok Sabha constituency: Jagatsinghpur
- Vidhan Sabha constituency: Nimapara

Ganeswarpur is an Indian village. The village falls under the Gop block of Puri District. It was founded before 1500 AD by Puri Gajapati Prataprudra Deva.

== Name ==
It is believed that, the village was settled after the famous Kanchi Vijay of Puri Gajapati Maharaja Sri Purushottama Deva. The village took his minister's name, Ganeswara Deva, in honor of him.

== Location ==
Ganeswarpur is a well known village of the famous Puri district of Odisha. It is situated between 19° 97' North Latitude 86° 01' Longitude and at an altitude of 5 fits above sea level. It is 30 km far from Puri town and 50 km from the state capital Bhubaneswar.Konark Sun Temple is just 13 kilometers from this place. The village is stretched from East to West. The east and north side of the village is surrounded by river Kushabhadra. On the south side by village Subarnapur and on the west by village Sankharia.

== History ==
It was founded before 1500 AD by Puri Gajapati Prataprudra Dev. At the very beginning Brahmins were brought from different places of Odisha to settle the village. The Brahmins whose heirs are since the beginning of the village are Panigrahis, Nandas, Dashs, Mohapatras, Badapandas, Hotas and Mishras. From the beginning, Lord Jagannath is being worshiped as Lord Gopaljeu in the village. It is heard for Lord Gopaljiu, these Brahmins were brought for different purposes. From some old sources it is believed that a long before the village was stretched from North to south. But due to frequent change in direction of river khusbhadra the village changed to its present form. This can be verified by 2 ponds. "Naara gadia" and "Bena gadia" which refers that queen is used to wash her hairs in these ponds. Some under ground wells n old pots also found in these areas while digging.

== Culture and tradition ==
There are 3 main temples in the village.

Manchanath Mandir (Lord Shiva). Gopaljiu Mandir.(Lord Jagannath) Grama Devati.

There are some more temples in the village. These are Lokanath Mandir. Thakurani Mandir. People observe festivals through the whole year. The famous festivals are Dola Purnima, Holi, Kartik Purnima, Raksha Bandhan, Margasir masa gurubar, Ganesh Chaturthi, Sheetal Sasthi, Ratha Yatra, Snana purnima, naga yatra and many more festivals. People are god fearing as well as god loving. Dola Purnima is most celebrated festival. It is celebrated for 6 days. 3 days before and 2 days after. Before 3 days to Dola Purnima Lord Gopaljeu is offered "bhoga"/"prasada" at every person's door. The Lord moves on a chariot accompanied by dholak, sahanai n traditional Ghanta. Bhoga is mostly "ukhuda","khai" and "Chudaghasa". Half of the village celebrates festival on Dola purnima but other half celebrates the next day i.e. on Holi. Holi is widely enjoyed by the villagers with an ending ceremony that is dancing crazily. In the evening all the villagers gathered near Gopaljeu temple because of Melana and cultural festival. The next day is really interesting. This day is called as "Nagagata". It is an old tradition originated from Puri. But the Ganeswarpur Nagas are quite different from that of puri. They are quite big in size and very aggressive. Apart from Dola Purnima villagers celebrate Ganesh Puja and Rama Nabami grandly with Bhajan sandhya, Parayana and Pala. Dushera is also celebrated grandly in Panigrahi family. They offer "Upana" to Goddess Durga.

== Geography and climate ==
Total area of the village almost 1 square km. Total population of the village is almost 1800. The village has a tropical climate, specifically a tropical wet and dry climate. The average temperatures range between a minimum of around 15 °C in the winter to a maximum of 35 °C to 40 °C in summer. Sudden afternoon thunderstorms are common in April and May. The south-west monsoons appear in June. The average annual rainfall is 154 cm, most of which is recorded between June and October.

== Educational institutions and offices ==
There is an Anganbadi for kids, a Nodal school from class 1 to class 7, a girls' high school from class 6 to class 10, a high school from class 8 to class 10 and an ITI college. Most villagers are well educated. There is a panchayat office in the village. An R.I. office, a post office and a co-operative society office are also in the village.

== About ==
The people of the village is from different castes. There are many sahis in the village. They are Mishra sahi, Dash sahi, Panigraghi sahi, Nanda Sahi, Bania sahi, Hata Sahi, Pradhan Sahi, Natha sahi, Baida sahi, Pana sahi, behera sahi, Sitha sahi and Bhoi sahi. The people who lives in the village depends mainly on cultivation. Most of the educated are serving as teachers, lecturers, IT professionals, managers, researchers, businessmen and government employees. Some are job holders. some of the people are settled in other parts of the country as well as in other parts of the Globe. Marriages, Brataghara are a socially means of communication where all helps each other. Village Kotha and Grama Sabha maintains the harmony and all the disputes of the village. Senior citizens are mostly respected. The village has a village market called Ganeswarpur Bazar which constitutes shops by the inhabitants of the village. Village is divided into some wards. Every ward has a ward member who are elected by the respective ward and works for the people of the same. People have different views on politics. They choose their candidate independently.

== Communication ==
It is connected to Puri, Nimapara, Bhubaneswar, Konark and Cuttack. It is connected by bus. But villagers prefer bus with their own vehicle.

== Temples of the village ==
- Gopal Jew Mandir
- Jageswaree Mandir
- Lokanath Mandir
- Manchanath Mandir

=== Nearby tourist spots ===
- Jagannath Temple, Puri
- Lokanatha Temple
- Konark Sun Temple
- Chandrabhaga
- Ramachandi Temple
- Bali Kapileshwar Temple, Puri
- Beleswar
- Nilakantheswar, Dihuda
- Joda linga
- Maa mangala temple, Kakatpur
- Maa Tarinee mandir, Dihuda
