= Lunahar =

Village in Orissa, India

Coordinates: 19.956528°N 85.984400°E

Lunahar is one of the villages situated in the Gop tehsil of Puri district, Orissa, India. Lunahar is located approximately 6 kilometers away from its tehsil Gop town, 30 kilometers (45 minutes drive) away from the city of Puri and 66 kilometers (1 hour and 30 minutes drive) away from Bhubaneswar, the capital city of Orissa.

There are 60 garh (forts) located at different places of Orissa including Lunahar. The village temples of Maa Dwarika Basini, Baba Balunkeswar, Baba Bateswar, Baba Trinathdev and Maa Durgadevi are located at Lunahar.
