= Pipili Assembly constituency =

Constituency of the Odisha legislative assembly in India

Coordinates: 20.11°N 85.83°E

Pipili
- Constituency No. 110 for the Odisha Legislative Assembly
- Pipili Assembly constituency in Puri district

Constituency details
- Country: India
- Region: East India
- State: Odisha
- Division: Central Division
- District: Puri
- Lok Sabha constituency: Puri
- Established: 1951
- Total electors: 2,38,309 (Note: as on 2024) (Note: as data published by election commission)
- Reservation: None

Member of Legislative Assembly
- 17th Odisha Legislative Assembly
- Incumbent Ashrit Pattanayak
- Party: Bharatiya Janata Party
- Elected year: 2024

Pipili is a Vidhan Sabha constituency of Puri district, Odisha.

This constituency includes Pipili, Pipili block and Delanga block.

== Elected members ==
Vote share of winning candidates
| 2024 | 51.55% |
| 2021 (bypoll) | 53.6% |
| 2019 | 50.66% |
| 2014 | 51.19% |
| 2009 | 49.14% |
| 2004 | 52.08% |
| 2000 | 56.25% |
| 1995 | 50.22% |
| 1990 | 66.35% |
| 1985 | 43.61% |
| 1980 | 39.83% |
| 1977 | 49.73% |

Since its formation in 1951, 18 elections were held till date including one bypoll in 2021. It was a 2-member constituency for 1957.

List of members elected from Pipili constituency are:

| Year | Member | Party |
|---|---|---|
| 2024 | Ashrit Pattanayak | Bharatiya Janata Party |
| 2021 (bypoll) (Note: Death of Pradeep Maharathy) | Rudra Pratap Maharathy | Biju Janata Dal |
| 2019 | Pradeep Maharathy | Biju Janata Dal |
| 2014 | Pradeep Maharathy | Biju Janata Dal |
| 2009 | Pradeep Maharathy | Biju Janata Dal |
| 2004 | Pradeep Maharathy | Biju Janata Dal |
| 2000 | Pradeep Maharathy | Biju Janata Dal |
| 1995 | Yudhistir Samantray | Indian National Congress |
| 1990 | Pradeep Maharathy | Janata Dal |
| 1985 | Pradeep Maharathy | Janata Party |
| 1980 | Bipin Dash | Indian National Congress (I) |
| 1977 | Kiran Lekha Mohanty | Janata Party |
| 1974 | Bipin Dash | Indian National Congress |
| 1971 | Abhimanyu Ransingh | Indian National Congress (R) |
| 1967 | Banamali Patnaik | Orissa Jana Congress |
| 1961 | Ram Chandra Patnaik | Indian National Congress |
| 1957 (Note: It was a 2 member constituency) | Gopinath Bhoi | Indian National Congress |
| 1957 | Ram Chandra Patnaik | Independent politician |
| 1951 | Jayakrushna Mohanty | Indian National Congress |

== Election results ==
=== 2024 ===
Voting were held on 25 May 2024 in 3rd phase of Odisha Assembly Election & 6th phase of Indian General Election. Counting of votes was on 4 June 2024. in 2024 election, Bharatiya Janata Party candidate Ashrit Pattanayak defeated Biju Janata Dal candidate Rudra Pratap Maharathy by a margin of 15,162 votes.

2024 Odisha Vidhan Sabha Election, Pipili
| Party | Candidate | Votes | % | ±% |
|---|---|---|---|---|
| BJP | Ashrit Pattanayak | 99,310 | 51.55 | ▲9.51 |
| BJD | Rudra Pratap Maharathy | 84,148 | 43.68 | ▼9.92 |
| INC | Gyan Ranjan Patnaik | 3,449 | 1.79 | ▼0.57 |
| NOTA | None of the above | 597 | 0.31 | |
| Majority | | 15,162 | 7.87 | |
| Turnout | | 1,92,653 | 80.84 | |
| BJP gain from BJD | | | | |

=== 2021 Bypoll ===
In 2021 bye-election, Biju Janata Dal candidate Rudra Pratap Maharathy defeated Bharatiya Janata Party candidate Ashrit Pattanayak by a margin of 20,916 votes.

2021 Odisha Legislative Assembly by-election: Pipili
| Party | Candidate | Votes | % | ±% |
|---|---|---|---|---|
| BJD | Rudra Pratap Maharathy | 96,972 | 53.60 | ▲2.94 |
| BJP | Ashrit Pattanayak | 76,056 | 42.04 | ▲0.42 |
| INC | Bishwokeshan Harichandan Mohapatra | 4,261 | 2.36 | ▼3.27 |
| NOTA | None of the above | 831 | 0.46 | |
| Majority | | 20,916 | 11.56 | − |
| Turnout | | 1,81,066 | 78.62 | |
| BJD hold | | | | |

=== 2019 ===
In 2019 election, Biju Janata Dal candidate Pradeep Maharathy defeated Bharatiya Janata Party candidate Ashrit Pattanayak by a margin of 15,787 votes.

2019 Odisha Legislative Assembly election: Pipili
| Party | Candidate | Votes | % | ±% |
|---|---|---|---|---|
| BJD | Pradeep Maharathy | 88,518 | 50.66 | ▼0.53 |
| BJP | Ashrit Pattanayak | 72,731 | 41.62 | ▲36.87 |
| INC | Ajit Mangaraj | 9,830 | 5.63 | ▼24.80 |
| NOTA | None of the above | 867 | 0.50 | |
| Majority | | 15,787 | 9.07 | |
| Turnout | | 1,74,875 | 76.43 | |
| BJD hold | | | | |

=== 2014 ===
In 2014 election, Biju Janata Dal candidate Pradeep Maharathy defeated Indian National Congress candidate Yudhistir Samantray by a margin of 33,474 votes.

2014 Odisha Legislative Assembly election: Pipili
| Party | Candidate | Votes | % | ±% |
|---|---|---|---|---|
| BJD | Pradeep Maharathy | 82,550 | 51.19 | − |
| INC | Yudhistir Samantray | 49,076 | 30.43 | − |
| Independent | Ashrit Pattanayak | 18,000 | 11.16 | − |
| BJP | Prafulla Prasad Gajendra | 7,656 | 4.75 | − |
| Majority | | 33,474 | 20.76 | − |
| Turnout | | 1,61,290 | 77.27 | |
| BJD hold | | | | |

=== 2009 ===
In 2009 election, Biju Janata Dal candidate Pradeep Maharathy defeated Indian National Congress candidate Yudhistir Samantray by a margin of 12,505 votes.

2009 Odisha Legislative Assembly election: Pipili
| Party | Candidate | Votes | % | ±% |
|---|---|---|---|---|
| BJD | Pradeep Maharathy | 74,112 | 49.14 | ▼2.94 |
| INC | Yudhistir Samantray | 61,607 | 40.85 | ▼2.73 |
| BJP | Ajit Mangaraj | 11,138 | 7.39 | − |
| Majority | | 12,505 | 8.29 (Note: % of total valid votes) | − |
| Turnout | | 1,50,809 | 73.43 (Note: 2004 Voter turnout was 73.39%) | ▲0.04 |
| BJD hold | | | | |
