= Ashrit Pattanayak =

Indian politician

Member of Odisha Legislative Assembly
- Incumbent
- Assumed office 4 June 2024
- Preceded by: Rudra Pratap Maharathy
- Constituency: Pipili

Personal details
- Party: Bharatiya Janata Party
- Profession: Politician

Ashrit Pattanayak is an Indian politician. He was elected to the Odisha Legislative Assembly from Pipili as a member of the Bharatiya Janata Party.
