= Pradeep Maharathy =

Indian politician (1955–2020)

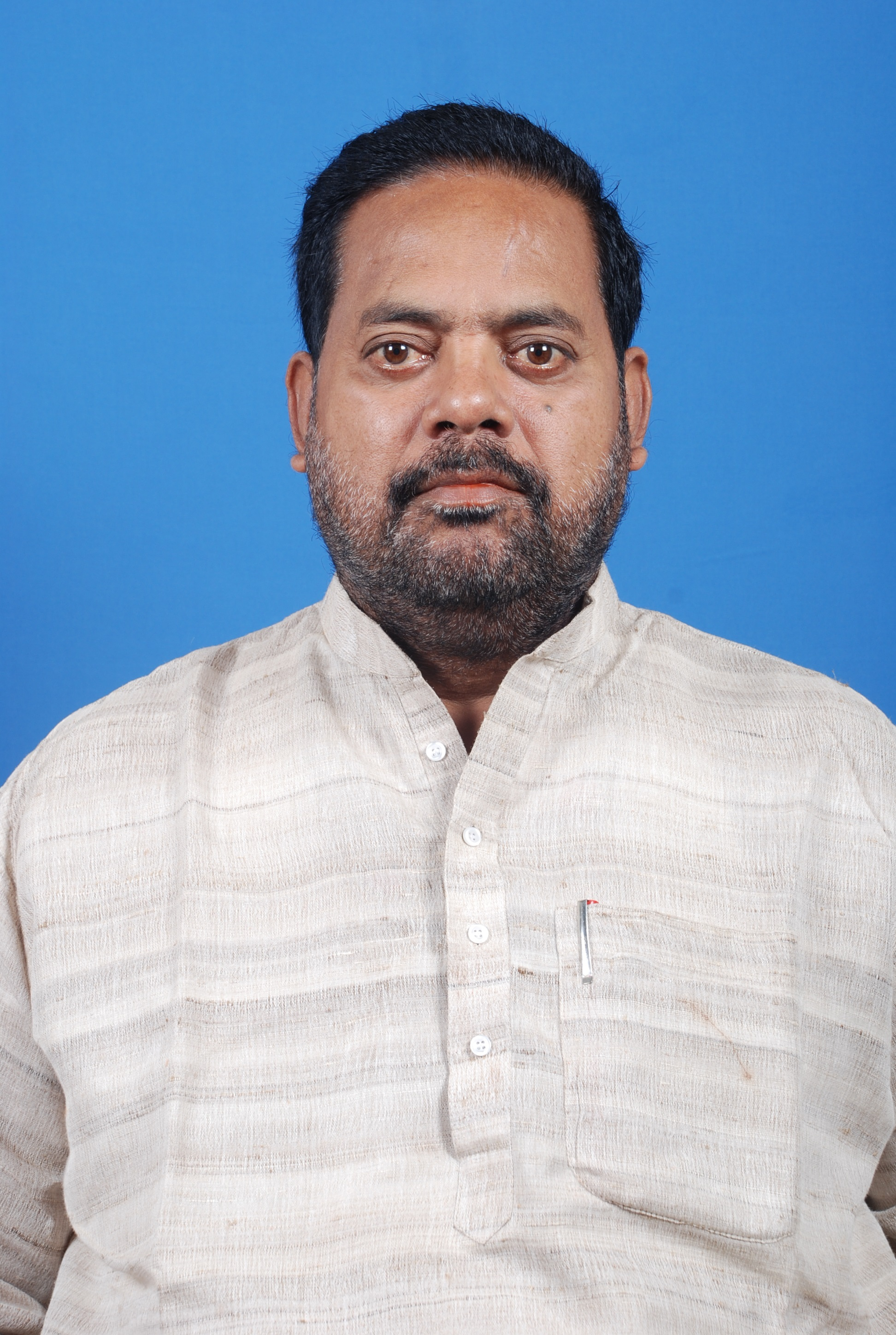

Member of Odisha Legislative Assembly
- In office 5 March 2000 – 4 October 2020
- Preceded by: Yudhistir Samantray
- Succeeded by: Rudra Pratap Maharathy
- Constituency: Pipili
- In office 1985–1995
- Preceded by: Bipin Dash
- Succeeded by: Yudhistir Samantray
- Constituency: Pipili

Personal details
- Born: 4 July 1955 Pipili, Odisha, India
- Died: 4 October 2020 (aged 65) Bhubaneswar, Odisha, India
- Party: Biju Janata Dal
- Spouse: Prativa Maharathy
- Children: Rudra Pratap Maharathy (son) Pallavi Maharathy (daughter)
- Parent: Gokulananda Moharathy (father)
- Education: Utkal University
- Profession: Politician

Pradeep Maharathy (4 July 1955 – 4 October 2020) was an Indian politician belonging to the Biju Janata Dal (BJD). At the time of his death, he was a member of the Odisha Legislative Assembly representing Pipili Constituency.

== Personal background ==
Pradeep Maharathy was born on 4 July 1955, in Pipili, Khorapada, Puri, the son of Gokulananda Maharathy.

Maharathy died of COVID-19 at a private hospital in Bhubaneswar during the COVID-19 pandemic in India. He was 65.

== Political career ==
He started his political career as a student leader in SCS college, Puri. For the first time in 1985 he was elected as the MLA from Pipili Constituency, Odisha. He was then a member of Janata Party. He was elected to the legislature seven times.

Year	Constituency	Party
1985	Pipili (52)	Janata Party
1990	Pipili (52)	Janata Dal
2000	Pipili (52)	Biju Janata Dal
2004	Pipili (52)	Biju Janata Dal
2009	Pipili (110)	Biju Janata Dal
2014	Pipili (110)	Biju Janata Dal
2019	Pipili (110)	Biju Janata Dal

In May 2011 Maharathy became Agriculture and Fisheries Minister in the Government of Odisha and served until 2012. He also served as Minister between 2014 and 2017. In 2017 he was named Minister of Panchayati Raj and Drinking Water.

== Awards received ==
Global Agriculture Leadership Award 2016

Krishi Karman Award 2014-15
