= Boito (company) =

Indian luxury clothing brand

- Type: Private
- Industry: Fashion
- Founded: 2022
- Founders: Richa Maheshwari
- Headquarters: Bangalore, India
- Key people: Richa Maheshwari
- Products: Luxury fashion and lifestyle
- Website: boito.in

Boito is an Indian slow fashion brand founded by Richa Maheshwari in 2022. The brand is known for preserving the traditional handwoven textiles of Odisha, blending them with modern designs.

== History ==
After visiting Odisha, engineer Richa Maheshwari founded Boito in 2022. She was impressed with the Bomkai, Khandua and other tribal weaves and textiles she observed.

Boito partnered with number of weaving communities in Odisha to preserve handloom traditions.

Boito's work was appeared in "Hyundai Translocal Series: Entangled and Woven" held from 4 September 2025 to 2 November 2025 at Manchester, UK. The show was co-organized by the Cheongju Craft Biennale 2025 (Cheongju, Korea) and the Whitworth, The University of Manchester (Manchester, UK).

=== Cheongju Craft Biennale, Korea ===
Boito was featured as one of the participating artists/collectives in the Hyundai Translocal Series: Entangled and Woven — an international craft and art initiative supported by Hyundai Motor Company that brings together artists from Korea, India and the UK to explore craft, community and cultural exchange through textile-based work.

=== XTANT 2025 ===
In May 2025, Boito made its international debut in XTANT 2025, an annual gathering of textile visionaries held in Mallorca, Spain.

=== The Great Elephant Migration ===
In 2025, Boito participated in The Great Elephant Migration, an international travelling public art installation featuring 100 life-sized elephant sculptures created to raise awareness about biodiversity conservation and human–wildlife coexistence. As part of the project’s Wrapped in History initiative, the brand designed and hand-wove a ceremonial textile blanket draped over one of the sculptures, incorporating Sambalpuri ikat, Khandua silk, Bomkai weaving, Pipli appliqué, and Dongria Kondh embroidery from Odisha.

== Textiles and Craft Techniques ==
Boito is a contemporary Indian fashion and art company which integrates traditional handwoven textiles from Odisha into modern garments. The brand collaborates directly with local weaving communities to preserve heritage techniques while adapting fabrics for contemporary Silhouettes. The company uses the different woven techniques such as Khandua, Kotpad Handloom fabrics, Ringa, Kapdaganda, Pasapali, Sambalpuri, and Pipili appliqué work, combining Artisanal craftsmanship with natural fibers and traditional dyeing methods.

== Founder ==
Boito was founded by Richa Maheshwari, who is an Indian designer and cultural researcher. She developed the brand after conducting immersive fieldwork in Odisha’s weaving communities. Her work integrates design with anthropology, cultural preservation, and sustainability. Maheshwari is also the creative lead behind Boito’s exhibitions and installations.

== Notable Arts & Exhibitions ==
- Durbar 2026 - At Durbar 2026, Boito brought together Odishan crafts including textiles, metalwork, appliqué, and woodcraft—into cohesive artistic installations. Their installations at Durbar—like Godawan, Boita Durbar, and Spirit of Matriarchy serve as narrative driven works rooted in Odisha’s history, ecology, and communities.
- Hyundai Translocal Series - In February 2026, Boito was exhibited in the Hyundai Translocal Series: Entangled and Woven, an international craft exhibition hosted at the National Crafts Museum & Hastkala Academy, New Delhi.
- This and That: Niraba Exhibition, Ahmedabad - Boito collaborated with This and That for the Niraba exhibition at Bougainvillea Gallery, Ahmedabad in November 2025.
- February 2025 – India Art Fair, New Delhi - Boito debuted at India Art Fair 2025 (Feb 6–9, 2025) with a large-scale Navagunjara installation at Booth C14, supported by Devi Art Foundation.
- India Art Fair 2025: The event was presented by India Art Fair and held at Triveni Kala Sangam, New Delhi. Boito was invited to exhibit, along with Johargram, 2112 Saldon and East.
- Whalesong, Parra, Goa (December, 2024 - January, 2025) - Boito' crafts was appeared in 2024. This was a retail exhibition and solo show held at Goa’s Whalesong Art Design Gallery.

== Awards ==
- Grazia Fashion Awards 2026
