= Basudeipur =

Village In Odisha, India

Coordinates: 20.006525°N 86.071611°E

Basudeipur is a village in the Gop block of Puri district, Odisha state of India.
