= Beleswar Temple =

Coordinates: 19.831879°N 85.942826°E

Beleswar is a Shiva temple adjoining sea beach in Puri district of Odisha, India.

Sunrise at Beleswar Beach
