= Ramachandi Temple =

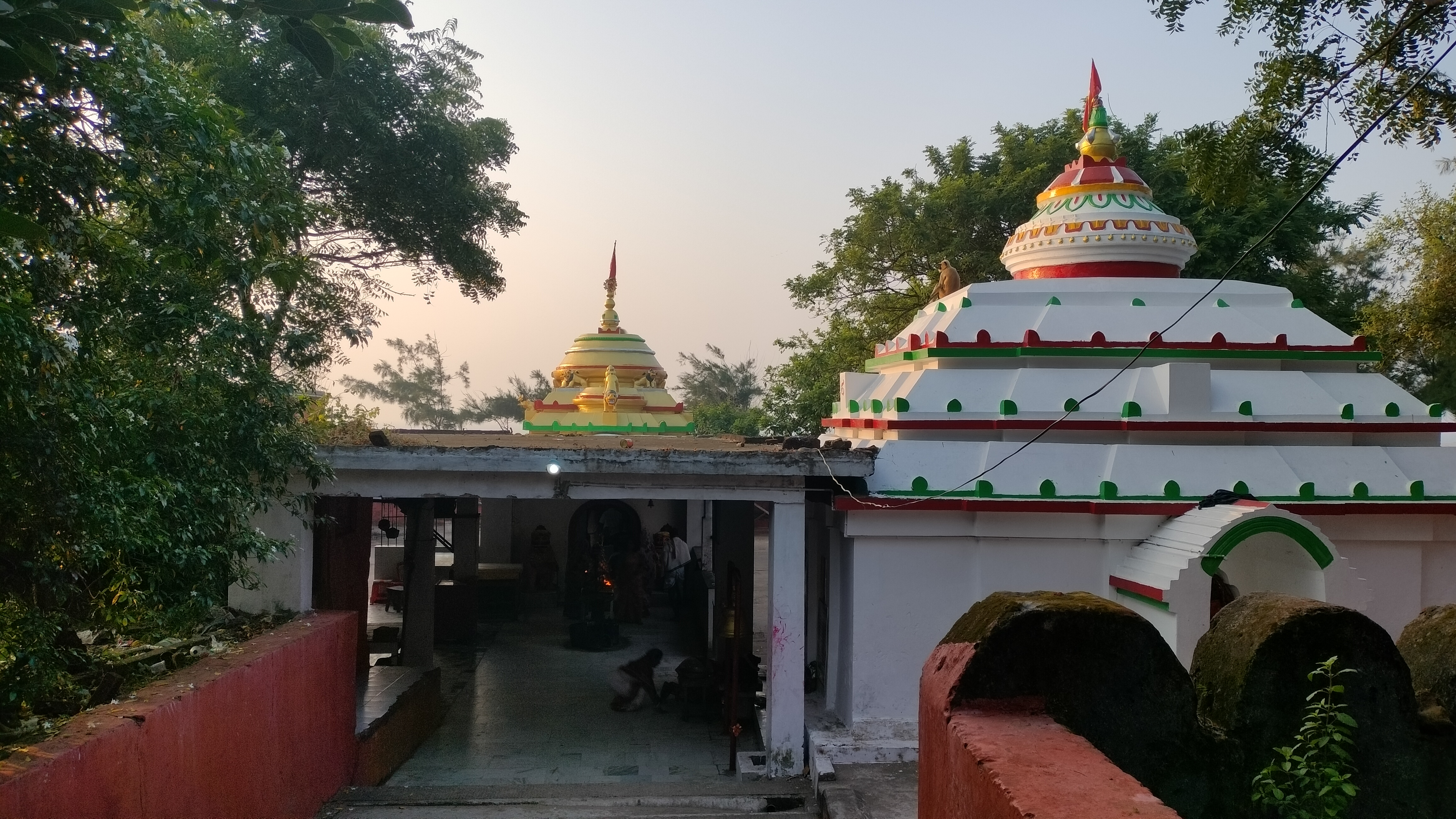
- Maa Ramachandi temple

- Location within Odisha

Religion
- Affiliation: Hinduism
- District: Puri
- Deity: Goddess Ramachandi
- Festival: Handi Bhanga Yatra
- Status: Functioning

Location
- Location: NH 316, Puri-Konark Marine Drive Road, Kahalakatapatana
- State: Odisha
- Country: India
- Interactive map of Ramachandi Temple
- Coordinates: 19.854580°N 86.059211°E

The Ramachandi Temple is located on the banks of the Kusabhadra River where it flows into the Bay of Bengal. It is about 5 km from Konark in the Puri District of Odisha, India. Some believe that Goddess Ramachandi, the deity of Konark, is the presiding deity of this temple, while others believe it was dedicated to Mayadevi, the wife of Surya (the Sun God).

== Location ==
The Temple of Goddess Ramachandi, situated at the mouth of Kushabhadra River, is a popular picnic spot. It lies 7 km before Konark on the Marine Drive road from Puri to Konark. Ramachandi is popularly believed to be the presiding deity of Konark, and the most benevolent Chandi known. It is certainly more ancient than the Sun Temple at Konark. From the architectural point of view, the temple of Ramachandi is not important but from the religious point of view, it is one of the famous Shakta pithas of Odisha.

Before the construction of the Marine Drive road, the place was not accessible to outside visitors. However it attracted a large number of local devotees to offer sacrifices or 'Bali' in the month of Ashwina.

== History ==
A legend regarding the deity is popular among the locals. Kalapahad, the rebel Hindu Brahmin youth who got converted to Islam, vowed to destroy all the temples of Hindu worship during the 17th century. After destroying the Sun temple, Kalapahad approached Ramachandi temple to destroy it. Then Goddess Ramachandi dressed as a Maluni (a maid servant) asked Kalapahad to wait at the door till she brings water from the river for the Goddess. Kalapahad anxiously waited for a long time to get some cold water. When it was too late and the Maluni did not return he was exhausted and entered inside the temple and found the throne empty. Then he thought the Maluni took away the deity with her and with anger he followed the Maluni. When he reached the bank of the Kushabhadra river he found the goddess Ramachandi floating in the middle of the river. At that time the river was outpouring, so he came back without being able to reach the middle of the river. Then Goddess Ramachandi came in dream of a Panda (priest) and told him to build a temple on the bank of the Kushabhadra river. This place is now known as Ramachandi. Throughout the year many visitors come here to get the blessing of Goddess Ramachandi and to enjoy the scenery of river Kushabhadra and Bay of Bengal.

Now the temple has collapsed leaving remains of its broken walls and the empty throne. There is no historical evidence to conclude about its presiding deity.
