= Maa Mangala Mandir, Kakatpur =

Hindu temple in Odisha, India

Maa Mangala Temple
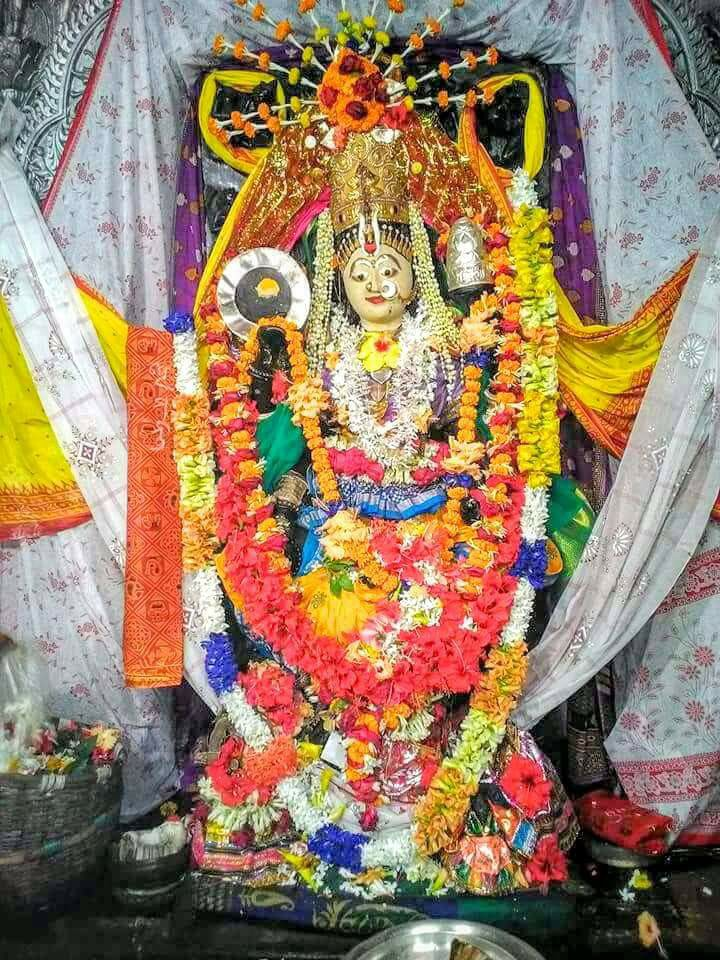
- Mukha Chandan Besa

- Location within Odisha

Religion
- Affiliation: Hinduism
- District: Puri
- Deity: Maa Mangala
- Festivals: Jhamu Yatra, Basanti Durga puja, Saradiya Durga Puja, Shri Durga Sayana Utsav, Debasnana Purnima

Location
- Location: Kakatpur
- State: Odisha
- Country: India
- Coordinates: 19°59′59.7″N 86°11′41.26″E

Architecture
- Creator: Bhakta Mohan Rayachudamani (Landlord of Nimapada)
- Completed: 16th century

Website
- www.maamangala.org

Maa Mangala Mandir is a Hindu Shakta pitha located in Kakatpur of Odisha, on the eastern coast of India.

== Overview ==
This is a 15th-century Hindu temple and a symbol of ancient Shakta pithas of Kalinga. The temple is situated on the eastern bank of holy river Prachi which was named Saraswati before.

Maa Mangala is a Hindu goddess who is one of the manifestations of Shakti. In ancient times, Buddhist monks used to symbolize Mangala as goddess Tara. Now the deity worshiped as one of manifestations of Hindu deity Durga in the hymn of the goddess Vanadurga.

Maa Mangala is the symbol of qualities like of peace, power, happiness, love, purity, knowledge & truth.

== Temple architecture & Cult ==
The carvings of the deity Mangala is in typical Odia style, having khilana & prabha back to her sitting place. The architecture of temple is a typical example of Utkaliya Peedha Vimana Style.

There is a bed made of solid stone on which it is said Maa Mangala rests after touring the entire universe every day. As if to attest to this, the bed looks worn out in just the same way it would if it were in use for centuries.

== History of the Evolution of the Deity ==
There is no written proof based on the evolution of the Deity. The legend behind the evolution has no base in ancient days. The myth is that in ancient times Utkala had a good commercial relationship with different islands like Singhala, Java, Sumatra etc. Demon Ravana used to worship goddess Mangala with his great devotion and became the most powerful by the blessing of the Deity. After the victory of Lord Ram, goddess was taken to Utkala from Singhala by a Sadhaba (one who do business with other country & islands). At that time the Prachi civilization was getting civilized and developed more day by day & was only path to enter Utkala. He established the Deity Mangala in Prachi valley.

== Legend ==
Evolution of the name of this place is associated with the deity Maa Mangala as believed by the locals of Kakatpur. Goddess Mangala kept herself hidden under the deep water of river Prachi. Once a boatman was sailing his boat across the river. Due to heavy rain and flood like situation he spent the whole night in the middle of the river. Just before dawn, Goddess Mangala came in his dream and asked him to recover her from the water and place her in nearby Mangalapur village. The boatman dived directly into the water and took the idol out of the river. After this the boatman saw a black crow dived into the exact spot where Maa Mangala was recovered and did not come out.

In Odia language, Crow means Kaa-kaw (କାକ) and Detained means Aw-taw-kaw (ଅଟକ). So by combining the two words it becomes Kaakaw-Awtawkaw (The detained crow). During the course of time the Mangalapur village became Kakatpur and the Goddess is known as Kakatpur Mangala.

The present Mandir was constructed on 1548 AD by Local Zamindar Panchanan Mitra Roychudamoni at Kakatpur with all the Sebak arrangements.

== Association with Jagannath Temple, Puri ==
Every twelve to nineteen years when the wooden icons of Jagannath, Balabhadra and Subhadra of the Jagannath Temple, Puri are replaced during the Nabakalevara rite, priests of the temple in Puri pray to Mangala in the Kakatpur temple to give them divine guidance. The goddess appears in their dreams and reveals the location of the three divine Daru Bramha trees from which idols of the deities are made.

== Transport ==
The temple is reachable by the roads from Cuttack, Bhubaneswar, Puri, Jagatsinghpur and Paradeep which are approximately 69 km, 60 km, 55 km, 38 km and 83 km respectively. The nearest railway stations are Bhubaneswar and Puri. The nearest airport is in Bhubaneswar.
