= Chelitalo =

Port in Ancient Odisha, India

Chelitalo was an important port in Ancient Odisha, in northeast India, lying on the Chandrabhaga river in Konark. The Chandrabhaga and Kushabhadra rivers were navigable in ancient times and may have been used to ship huge blocks of stone for constructing the Konark Sun Temple.

The Chinese pilgrim Hiuen-Tsang, who visited Orissa in the 7th century AD, described Chelitalo as a busy port. The port has been identified with Konark, Puri and (perhaps most likely) with the archeological site of Manikpatna. By the 7th century AD, the city was a noted seat of Mahayana Buddhism. Hiuen-Tsang described it as surrounded by strong and high walls, containing five great convents adorned with images of Buddha and Bodhisattva. It was connected to Cuttack by roads and waterways.
