= Bata Mangala Temple =

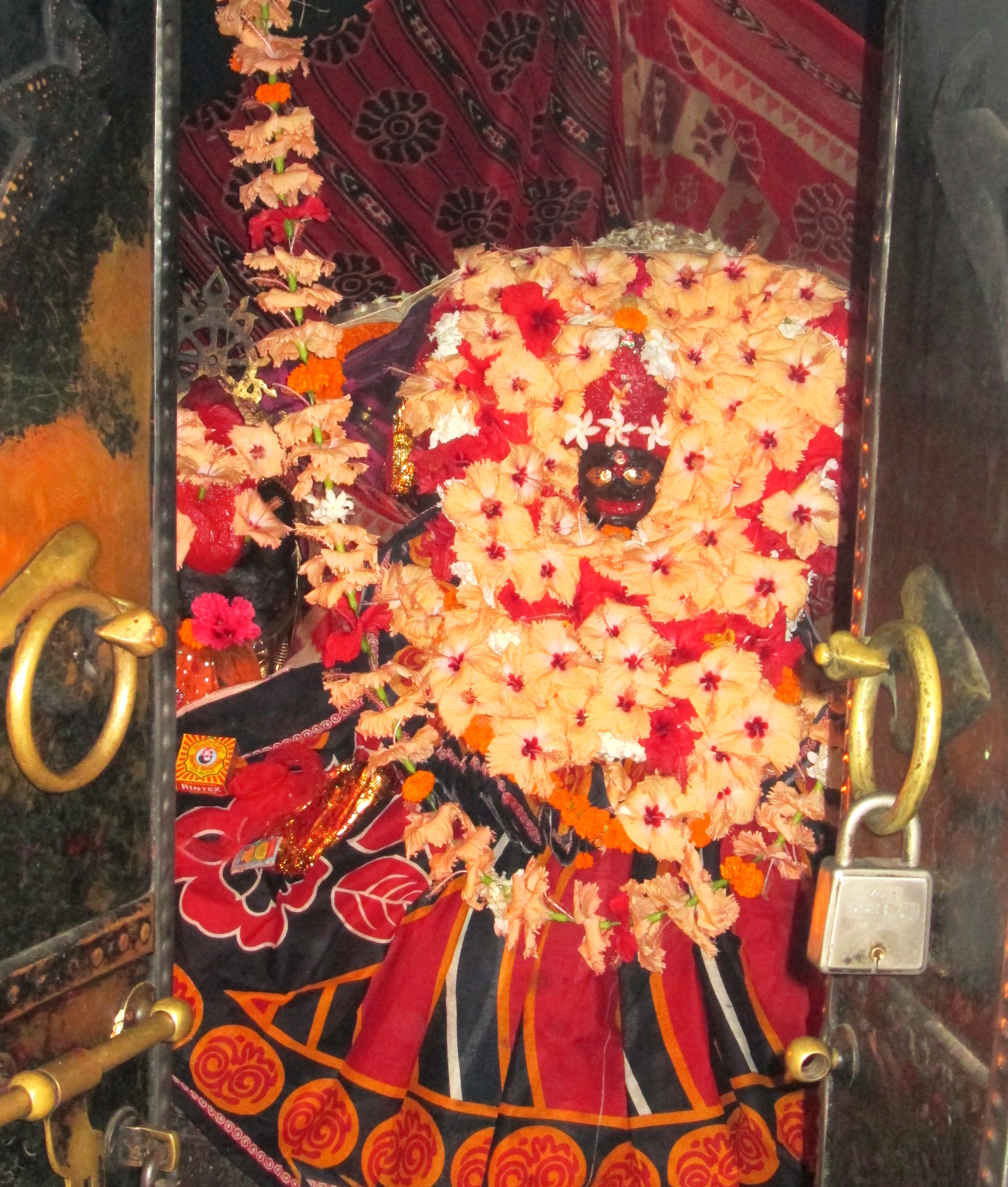
- Goddess Bata Mangala

- Bata Mangala Temple

Religion
- Affiliation: Hinduism
- District: Puri

Location
- Location: Jagannath Sadak
- State: Odisha
- Country: India
- Coordinates: 19.840154°N 85.836783°E

Architecture
- Temple: One

Bata Mangala Temple is a temple dedicated to the Hindu Goddess Mangala. The temple is located 7 km away from the Hindu Holy town of Puri in the state of Odisha, India. The temple is revered by devotees on the way to the nearby Jagannath Temple. It is customary that devotees pray in this temple before they proceed to the Jagannath Temple.

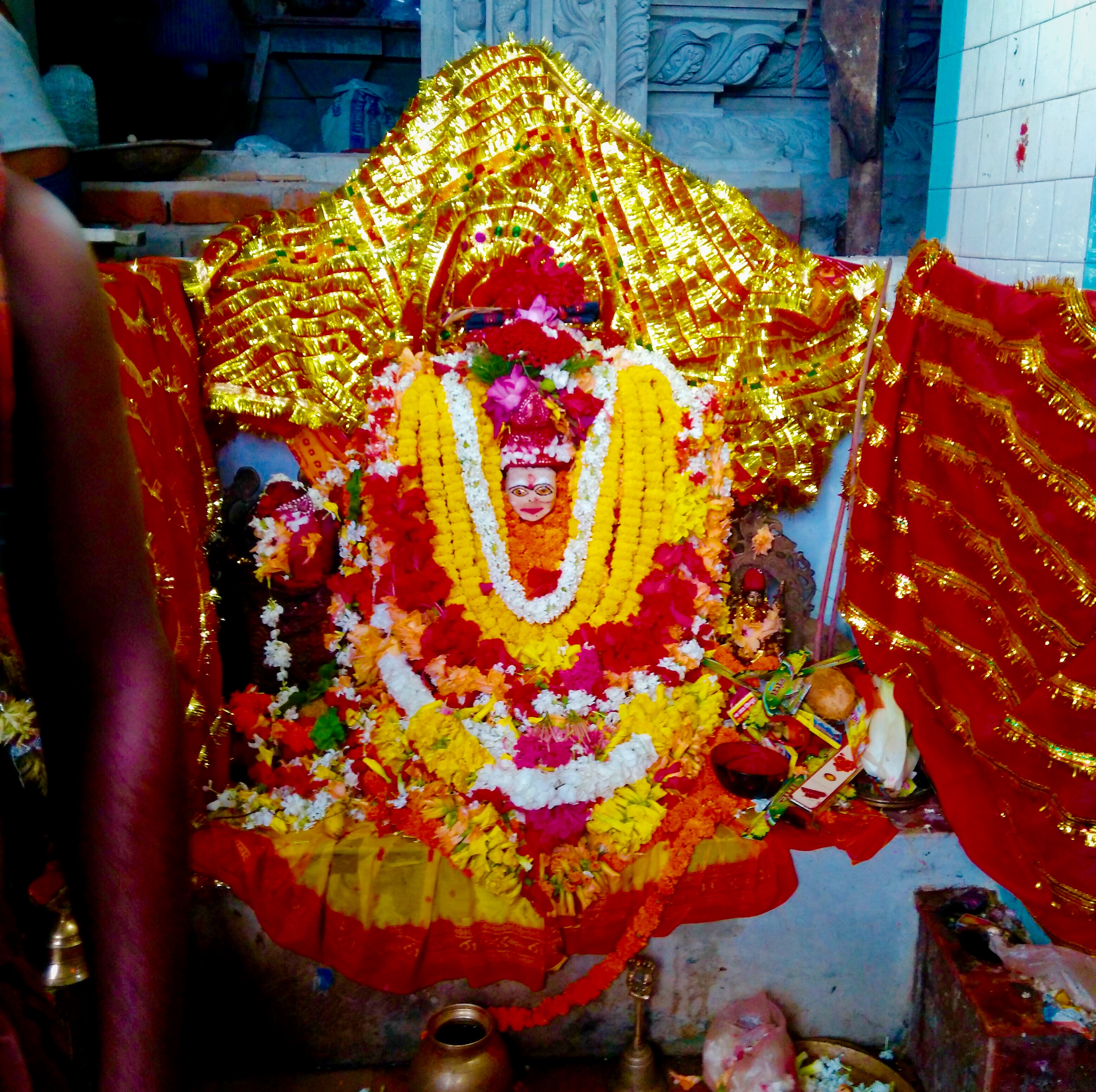
The idol of Goddess Bata Mangala

It is said that when Brahma first came into existence it was confused on seeing a great void all around him. The goddess Bata Mangala appeared to it guiding it to Lord Jagannath . Thus did Brahma gain its focus and proceed with the task of cosmic creation.
