= Kakatpur =

- Semi-urban town
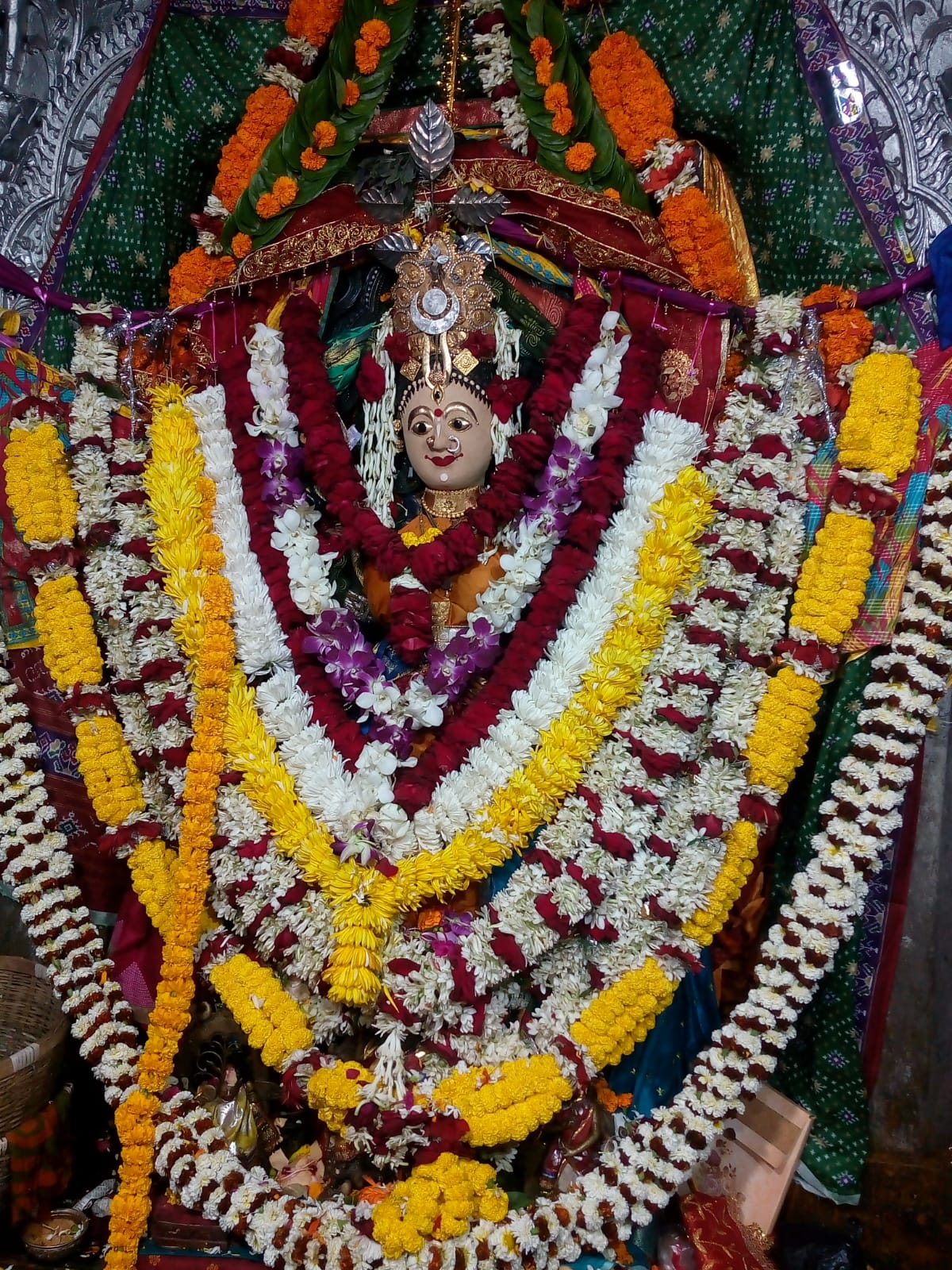
- Maa Mangala

- Location in Odisha, India Kakatpur (India)
- Coordinates: 20.0019°N 86.2015°E
- Country: India
- State: Odisha
- District: Puri
- Named for: Place of detained crow

Government
  - Type: Gram Panchayat
  - Body: Kakatpur Gram Panchayat
  - Member of Legislative Assembly: Tusharkanti Behera (BJD)
  - Member of Parliament: Bibhu Prasad Tarai (BJP)
- Elevation: 17 m (56 ft)

Languages
  - Official: Odia, English
- Time zone: UTC+5:30 (IST)
- PIN: 752108
- STD Telephone code: 06758
- Vehicle registration: OD-13 (Old OR-13)
- Block: Kakatpur
- Odisha Legislative Assembly Constituency: Kakatpur
- Lok Sabha Constituency: Jagatsinghpur

Kakatpur is a semi-urban town in Puri district in the Indian state of Odisha.

== Geography ==
Kakatpur is located at 20.0019°N 86.2015°E. It has an average elevation of 17 m (56 ft).

== History ==
Kakatpur is situated in the bank of ancient Prachi River. The Prachi Valley Civilization grew in this periphery which traces its inception from Stone Age. As it is the site of Mahanadi River Delta, it used to be a robust trade route for Sadhabas for their trade to Southeast Asia.

Evolution of the name of this place is associated with the deity Mangala. As per the legend, Goddess Mangala kept herself hidden under the deep water of river Prachi. Once a boatman was sailing his boat across river. Due to heavy rain and flood like situation he spent whole night in the middle of river. Just before the dawn, Goddess Mangala came in his dream and asked him to recover her from the water and place her in nearby Mangalapur village. The boatman dived directly into the water and took the idol out from the river. After this the boatman saw a black crow dived into the exact spot where Maa Mangala was recovered and did not come out. In Odia language, Crow means Kaakaw (କାକ) and Detained means Aw-taw-kaw (ଅଟକ). So by combining the two words it becomes Kakat (Kaakaw-Awtawkaw). During the course of time the Mangalapur village became Kakatpur and the Goddess is known as Kakatpur Mangala.

== Notable sites ==
- Maa Mangala Mandir, Kakatpur

== Politics ==
Kakatpur is a part of Kakatpur Assembly Constituency. Current MLA from Kakatpur Assembly Constituency is Tusharkanti Behera of BJD, who won the seat in State elections in 2019 and 2024.

Kakatpur is a part of Jagatsinghpur Lok Sabha constituency.

== See also ==
- Bata Mangala Temple
- Sarala Temple
- Vimala Temple
