= Pipili appliqué work =

Appliqué work from Pipili, Odisha, India

Pipili Appliqué Work
- Geographical indication
- Alternative names: Chandua (Odia: ଚାନ୍ଦୁଆ Cānduā)
- Type: Handicraft
- Area: Pipili, Puri district, Odisha
- Country: India
- Material: Fabric

The village of Pipili, Puri district, Odisha, India, is well known for its appliqué work, traditionally known as Chandua (Odia: ଚାନ୍ଦୁଆ Cānduā) in India. "Appliqué" comes from the French word appliquer, meaning "to put on". There are two variants to this technique: appliqué, where a fabric shape is sewn over a base layer, and reverse appliqué, wherein two layers of fabric are laid down, and a shape is subsequently cut out from the upper layer, exposing the lower layer, before both are stitched together. It is one of the products which has been granted Geographical Indication (GI) by the government of India (Application No. 86 and 108).

== Etymology ==
The word Chandua (Odia: ଚାନ୍ଦୁଆ Cānduā) is derived from the Sanskrit word Candrātapa (Sanskrit:चन्द्रातप, Candrātapa) and the Prakrit word Candāava (Prakrit:चंदाअव, Candāava) meaning moonlight, an awning, canopy, lantern.

== History ==
Pipili appliqué work owes its origin to the culture of Lord Jagannath during the 12th century. Earlier appliqué canopies, umbrellas and lanterns were prepared by the Gajapatis for the annual Ratha Jatra of Jagannath.

== Use ==
Nowadays its usage is more in household, decorative and festival products. The appliqué items are mainly used during rituals and jatras of the deities, particularly the colourful appliqué cloth covers of the three rathas of the deities during Rath Jatra. Apart from differences in colour the basic design of all three is similar. Appliqué work is also used in making pillows, seats and ritual dresses for the deities.

== Designing ==
The base cloth includes water proof material for umbrellas, velvet for tents, cotton, and threads.

Mythical and natural figures are used for the work, including peacocks, ducks, parrots, trees, elephants, creepers, flowers such as jasmine and lotus, the Sun, half-moon, and Rahu (a mythical demon who once swallowed up the sun).

The craft involves embroidering and stitching. For attaching the pieces of cloth the makers use straight stitch, satin stitch, blind stitch, or buttonhole stitch. Sometimes they also make mirror work and many decorative stitches.

== Pipili village ==
Pipili is a small town, situated about 40 kilometers from Puri, Odisha. The income of this town is essentially dependent on the business of its handicrafts of which the appliqué works are the main source. Nowadays, Pipili is globally known as the destination of appliqué and is where many workers and workshops continue to practise the technique, creating both traditional and contemporary items.

== Guinness Book of Records ==
Pipili has an entry in 2004 in the Guinness Book of Records, for the world's largest thematic appliqué work. The 54-metre (177 ft) long work is filled with depictions of India's struggle for independence.
