= Lokanatha Temple =

Coordinates: 19.920493°N 85.818156°E

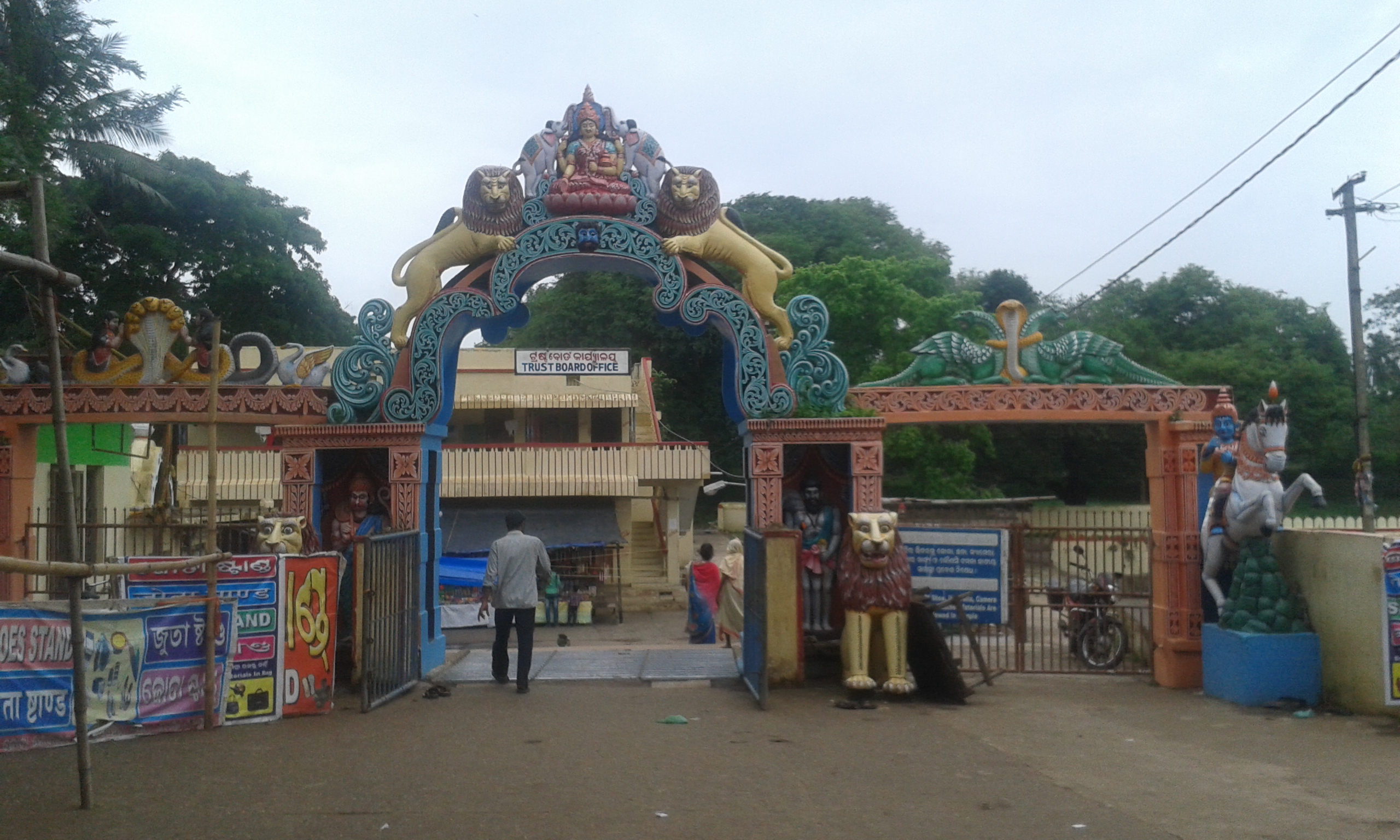

Religion
- Affiliation: Hinduism
- District: Puri
- Deity: Lokanatha (Shiva)

Location
- Location: Puri
- State: Odisha, India
- Country: India
- Interactive map of Lokanatha Temple

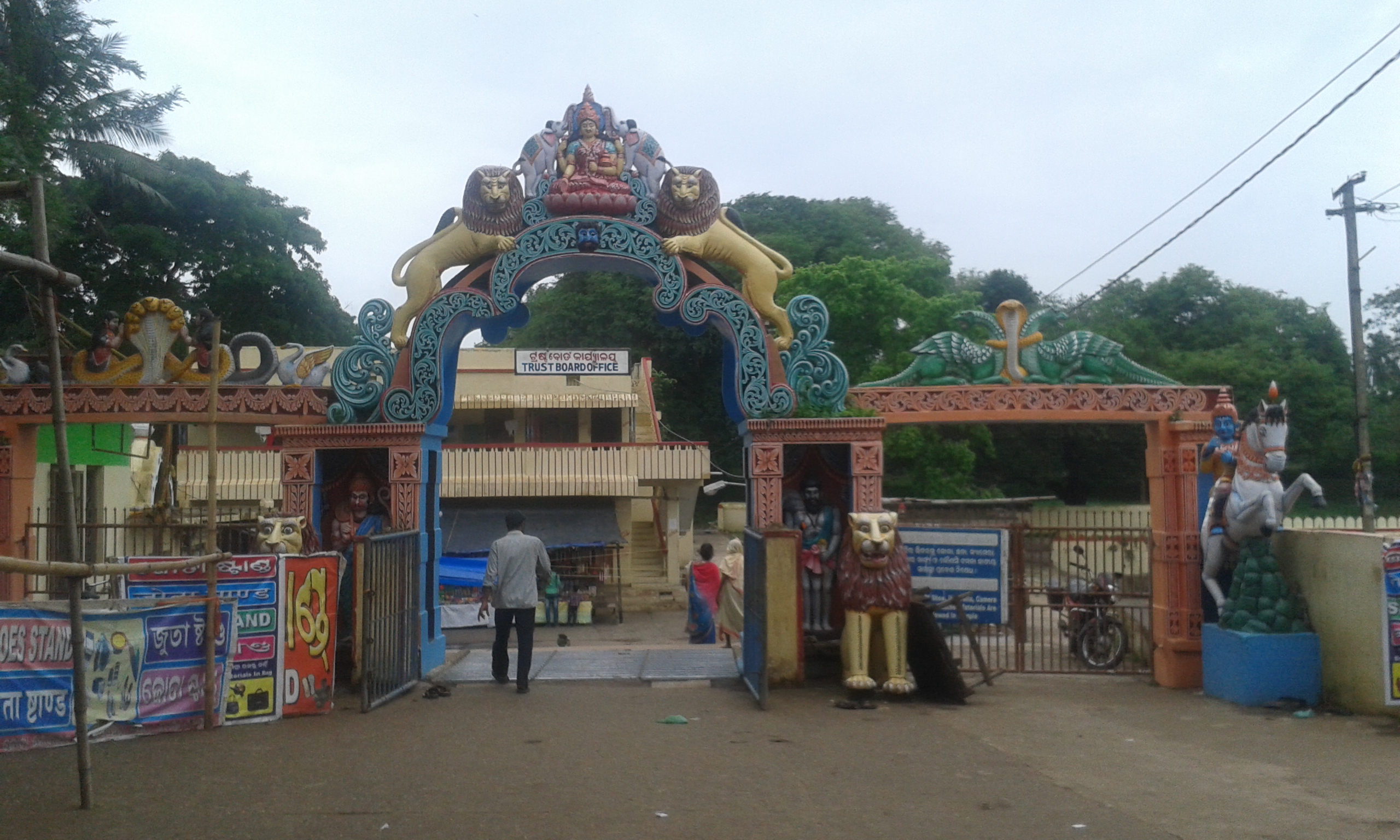

Lokanatha Temple is a Hindu temple in the town of Puri, Odisha, India. It is dedicated to the god Shiva as Lokanatha. As per legend, linga, the symbol of Shiva was established as the central icon by the god Rama. The unique feature is that the linga is always under water which substantiates the legend that the Ganges river flows through the top of the linga as a stream.

The festival of Sankranti Somavar is celebrated with great fervor in the temple. A fair is held. Devotees believe that the darshan (holy sight) of the linga can cure disease.

The utsava murti (festival icon) of Lokanatha is kept inside the Jagannath temple, Puri. He is the guardian deity of all the treasures and jewelry of the god Jagannath, presiding deity of the temple complex. This temple is one of the five famous Shiva temple of Puri. Others are Markandeswara Temple, Jambeswar Temple, Banambara Temple and Kapalamochana Temple.

== Festivals ==
Shivaratri and Mondays especially of the month of Vaishakha, Shraavana and Kartika.
