= Manikpatna =

Manikpatna or Manikapatna ( Odia: ମାଣିକପାଟଣା ) is an archeological site in the state of Odisha in eastern India. It has been identified with the medieval port of Chelitalo described by the Chinese pilgrim Hiuen Tsang. The site is located on the sea coast near Brahmagiri which is situated near the left bank of the Bhargavi river, at the northeastern end of the Chilika Lake.

Findings indicate trade contacts with many countries. Chinese celadon ware and porcelain has been dated to different centuries, showing prolonged trade. Trade with the Roman Empire is evident from fine grayish-white rouletted pottery, knobbed ware and fragments of amphora. Other pottery fragments originate from Burma, Siam and Arabian countries. A Sri Lankan coin belonging to the reign of Sahassa Malla has been found dating from the 11th or 12th century AD.

The site is named after the nearby village of Manikpatna, which in turn is named after Manika, a milkmaid whom legend says sold yogurt to Lord Jagannath and Lord Balabhadra when they passed by. The village is home to the Bhabakundalesvara Temple, which has a Shiva Linga made of black chlorite stone as the presiding deity.
