= Alekh Patra =

Indian nationalism

- Born: Alekh Patra; 1 July 1923; Bishulipada, Nayahaat, Puri
- Died: 17 November 1999 (aged 76); Sambalpur, India
- Resting place: 20.905°N 82.819°E
- Education: B.A.
- Alma mater: Cuttack
- Known for: Leadership of Indian independence movement, philosophy of Satyagraha, Ahimsa or non-violence. pacifism
- Movement: Indian National Congress, Sarvodaya
- Spouse: Bhagwati Patra
- Children: 3
- Awards: Tamra Patra

Alekh Patra ( 1 July 1923 – 17 November 1999) was a prominent leader of Indian nationalism in British-ruled India. Employing non-violent civil disobedience, he participated in Indian Independence Struggle and inspired movements for civil rights environmental protection movements, civil rights across different regions of Odisha.

== Freedom movement ==
He participated in the freedom movement at the age of about 18. During the course of freedom struggle, he along with his friends, burnt down the police station of Nimapada in protest of British Raj. During this event, there was police firing and one of his close associate and friend died on the spot. He survived and was arrested and put in Puri Jail. He continued his underground struggle against the colonialism. He went to Calcutta and worked there as a domestic help, in some rich person's house, keeping his underground works running.

But he could not stay long there as he wanted to fight openly with Acharya Harihar, Gopabandhu Das etc., and on request of his friends, he came back to Odisha. He was caught at the Puri Railway station when he arrived back from Kolkota, and again put into jail.

Inside the jail, he practicised cotton spinning to produce his own clothing, cleaning up of toilets to maintain a hygienic environment, do daily group prayer and follow other instructions of Gandhiji. After being released from the jail, he went to Wardha to get training on Swaraj, home rule and other Sarvodaya works.

== Book published on his first death anniversary ==
A book Mati Deepara Alekhya (Odia: ମାଟିଦୀପର ଆଲେଖ୍ୟ) was published on the occasion of his first death anniversary, with articles from some prominent authors and famous persons of the state.

== Awards and honours ==
1. Awarded the Freedom Fighters pension
2. Awarded Copper Honorarium from Govt. of India.
3. Awarded Honorarium from Citizen's forum of Kashipur for the cause of Environment and Tribal people's causes
4. Certified letter of perfection in Khadi Production from Gandhiji
