= Rudra Pratap Maharathy =

Indian politician

- ରୁଦ୍ର ପ୍ରତାପ ମହାରଥୀ
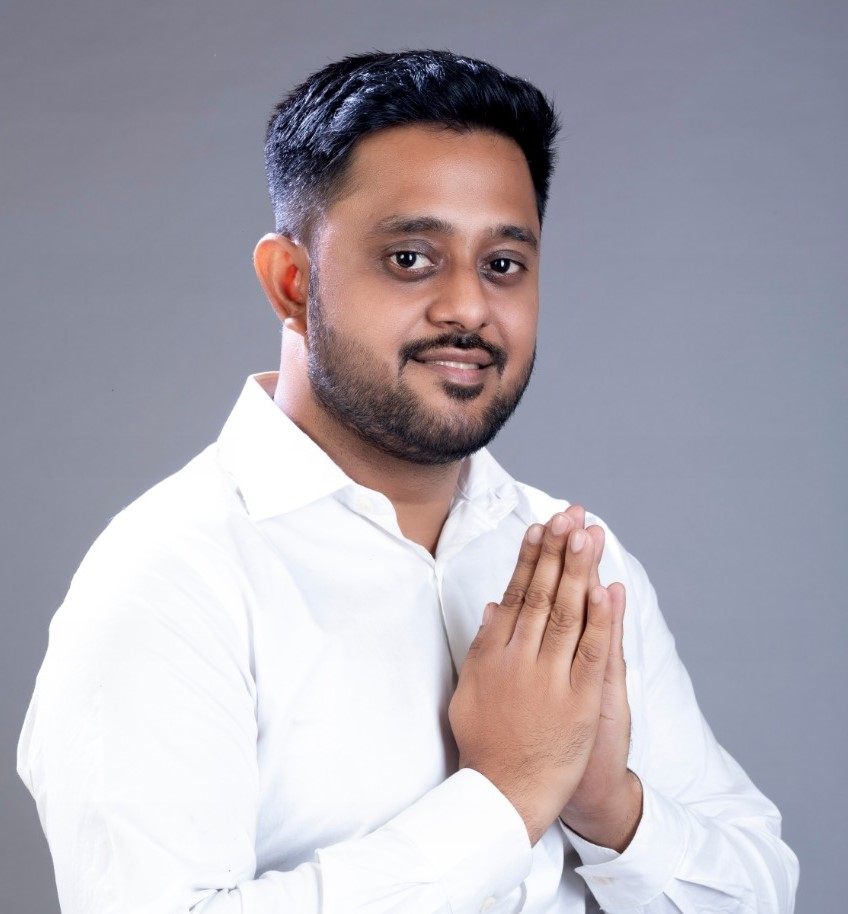

Member: 16th Odisha Legislative Assembly
- In office 2021–2024
- Preceded by: Pradeep Maharathy
- Constituency: Pipili

Personal details
- Born: 21 June 1988 (age 38)
- Party: Biju Janata Dal
- Spouse: Jagruti Panda
- Children: 1
- Parent(s): Pradeep Maharathy (Father); Pratibha Mishra (Mother)
- Education: Kalinga Institute of Industrial Technology, Regional College of Management
- Occupation: Politician
- Website: maharathy.in

Rudra Pratap Maharathy is an Indian politician from Odisha. He is active with Biju Janata Dal in Odisha politics. He was elected to the Odisha Legislative Assembly in the 2021 Pipili bypoll as a member of the Biju Janata Dal. He defeated Ashrit Pattanayak of Bharatiya Janata Party in a margin of 20,916 votes. In 2024 Odisha Assembly Election, he lost to Ashrit Pattanayak of Bharatiya Janata Party by a margin of 15,162 votes.

== Early life and family ==
Rudra Pratap Maharathy was born to former Indian politician Pradeep Maharathy and Pratibha Mishra.

He completed a Bachelor of Technology in Computer Science at Kalinga Institute of Industrial Technology, Bhubaneswar, in 2011, and later earned an MBA in Marketing and Human Resources from the Regional College of Management, Bhubaneswar, in 2013.Government of Odisha (May 2024). "Rudra Pratap Maharathy – Affidavit (page 14)" (PDF). Puri District Administration.

== Political career ==
Rudra has entered active politics after the death of his father in 2021. He joined Biju Janata Dal and in 2021 Pipili by-election, he got 96,972 votes and defeated BJP's Ashrit Pattanayak by a margin of 20,916 votes. In 2024 Odisha Assembly Election, he lost to Ashrit Pattanayak of Bharatiya Janata Party by a margin of 15,162 votes.
