= Kushabhadra River =

River in Odisha, India

Coordinates: 19.85°N 86.0667°E

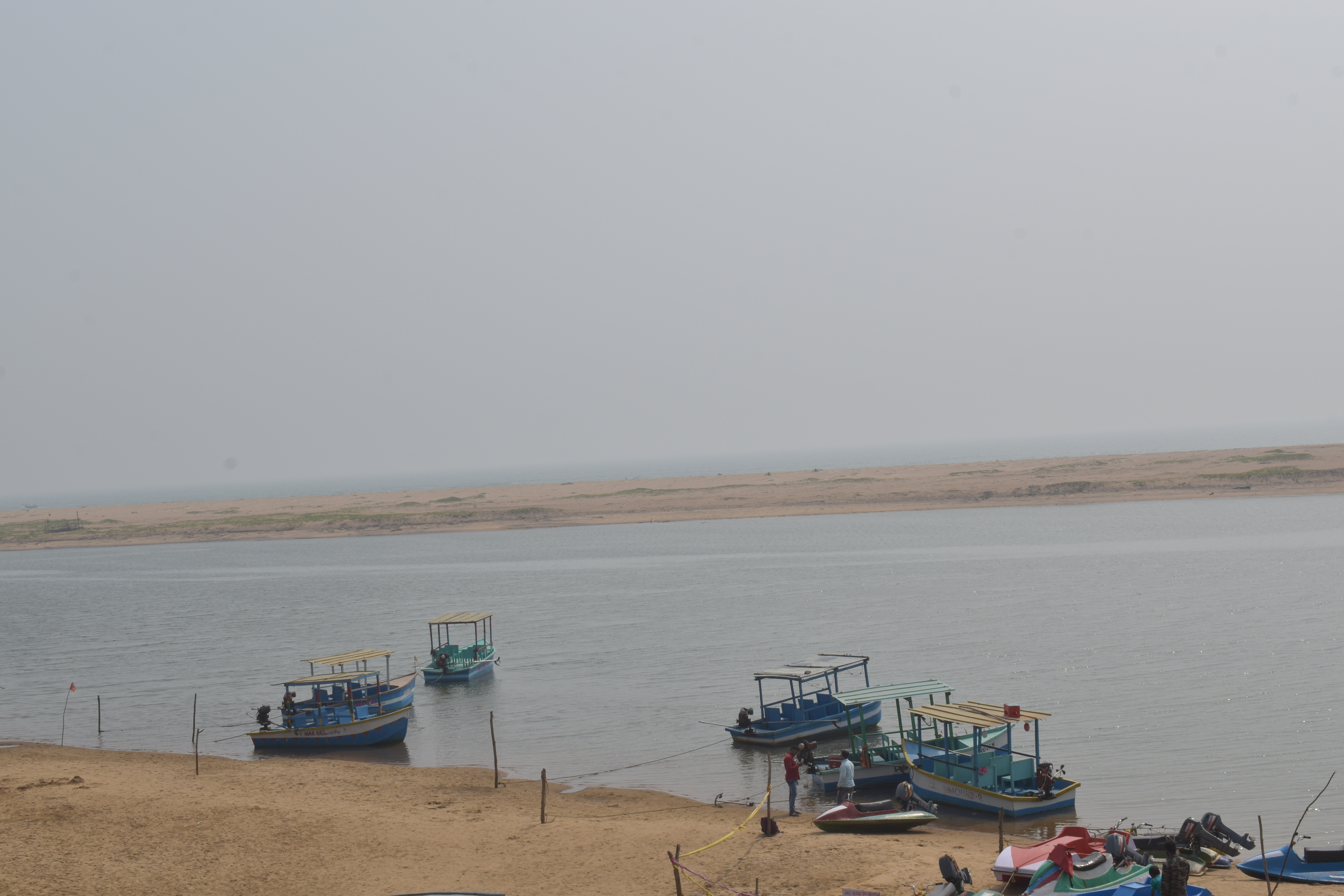
Kushabhadra River near Ramchandi

Kushabhadra River forms the complex of river systems which form the distributaries of the Mahanadi River. It branches off from the Kuakhai River, which is a distributary of the Mahanadi, at Balianta and flows in a south western direction towards Nimapara and Gop for 46–50 miles before flowing into the Bay of Bengal near Ramachandi Temple, 15 miles east of Puri in the Puri District of Odisha.

Dhanua River is the main tributary of the Kushabhadra.
