= Pipili =

- Town
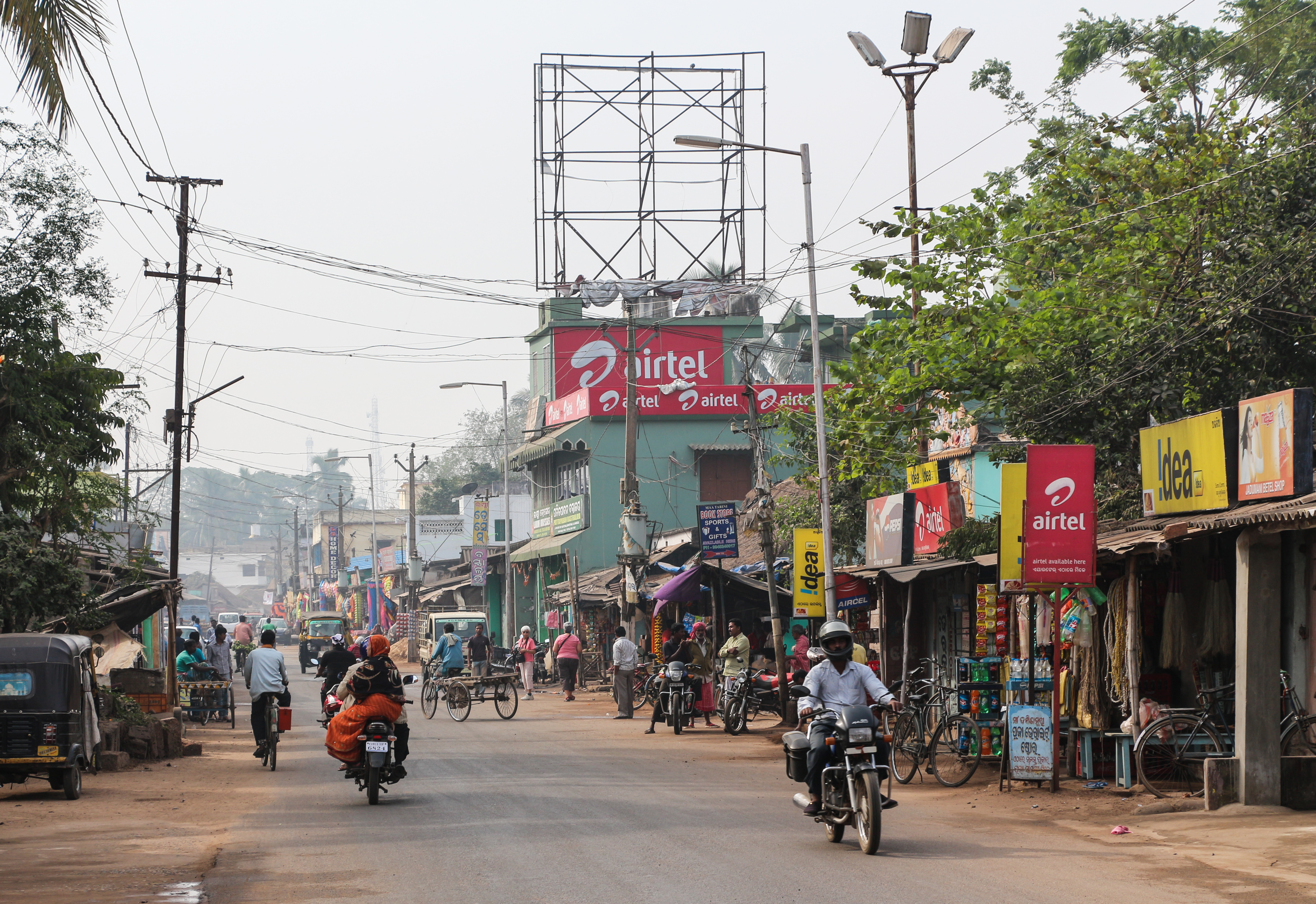
- Main street of Pipili

- Location in Odisha, India Pipili (India)
- Coordinates: 20.12°N 85.83°E
- Country: India
- State: Odisha
- District: Puri
- Elevation: 25 m (82 ft)

Population (2001)
  - Total: 14,263

Languages
  - Official: Odia
- Time zone: UTC+5:30 (IST)
- Vehicle registration: OD 13
- Website: odisha.gov.in

Pipili is a town and a NAC of Puri district in the Indian state of Odisha. It is famous for designing beautiful Applique handicrafts. It is a town of artisans famous for their colourful fabrics.

== Geography ==
Pipili is located at 20.12°N 85.83°E. It has an average elevation of 25 metres (82 feet).

It is 36 kilometres from Puri, and 18 kilometers from Bhubaneswar, at the junction where the Konark road branches from the Bhubaneswar to Puri road.

== Demographics ==
As of 2001 India census, Pipili had a population of 14,263. Males constitute 51% of the population and females 49%. Pipili has an average literacy rate of 70%, higher than the national average of 59.5%: male literacy is 77%, and female literacy is 63%. In Pipili, 12% of the population is under 6 years of age.

As per 2011 Census, the population of Pipili is 17,623, including 9,036 males and 8,587 females.

== Economy ==
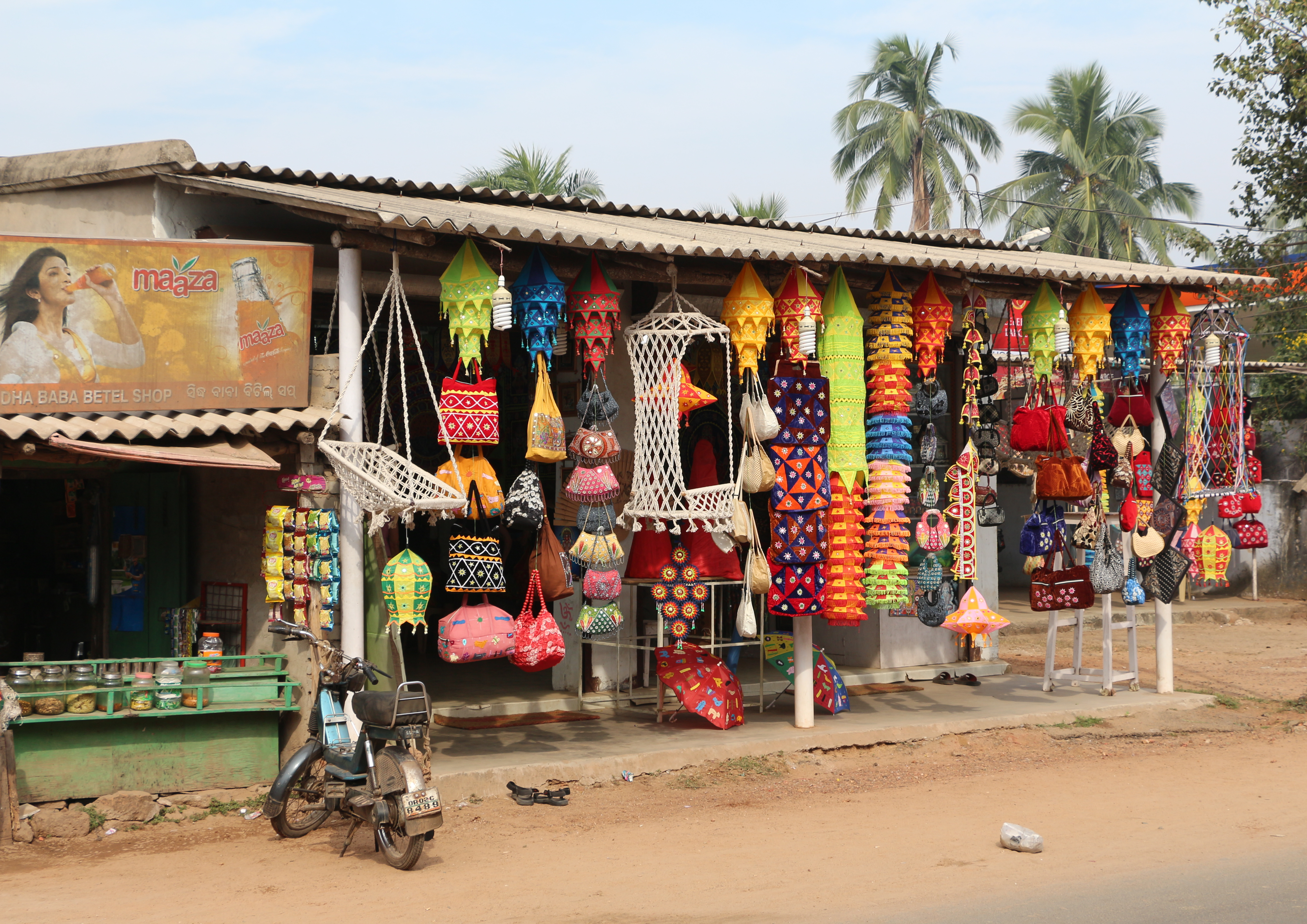
Handicraft shop in Pipili

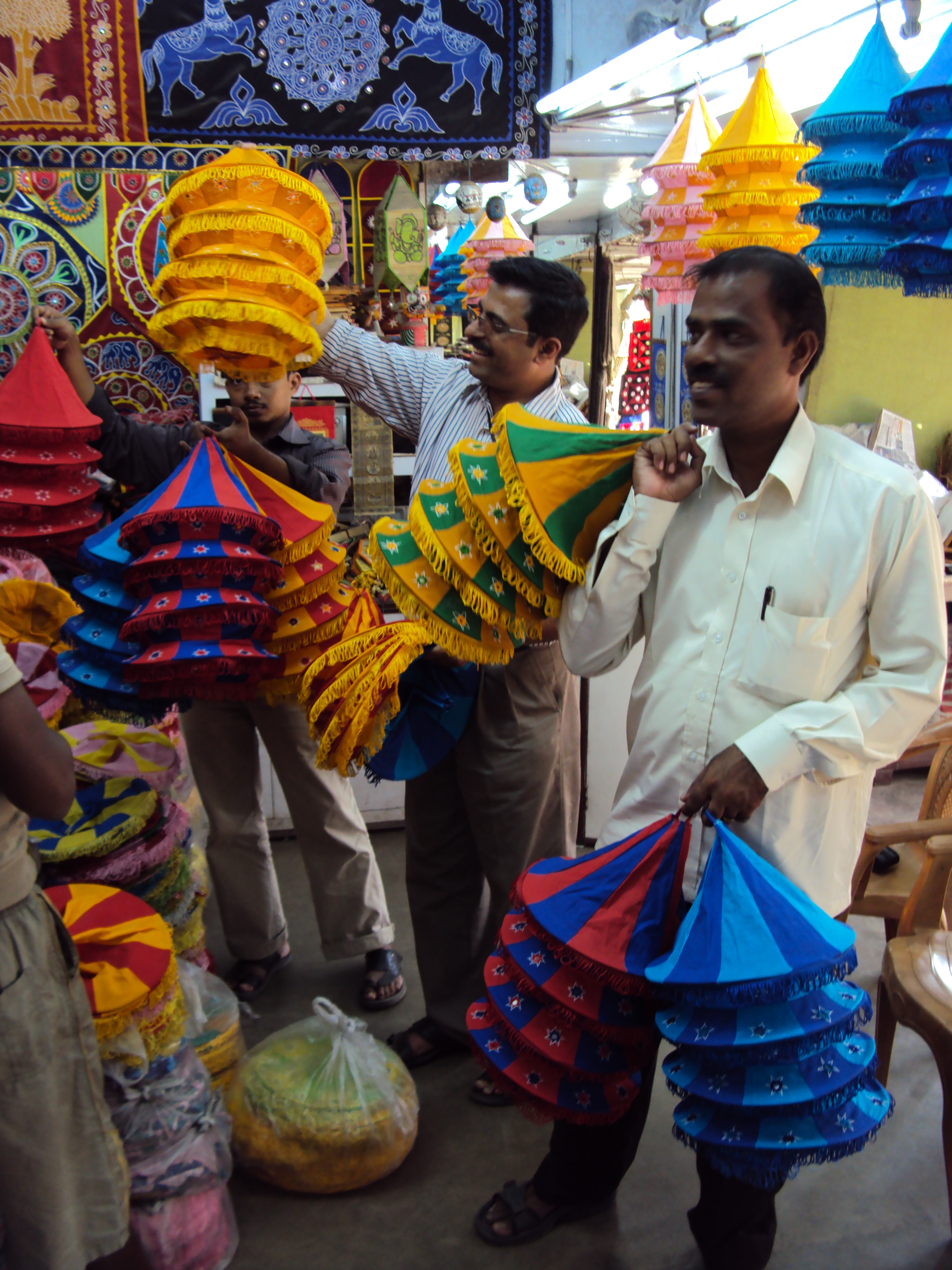
Tourists purchasing Pipili handicrafts

The applique work of Pipili, also known as "chandua" in colloquial language, is probably most well known handicraft in Puri and surrounding area.

== Education ==
The Kidutopia Playschool/Preschool of Pipili is managed by a qualified engineer operating in Pipili bazaar and surrounding area. There is Government college and Private science college along with other training institutes for coaching. It's a compact township with educated and aware citizens.

== Politics ==
Current MLA from Pipli Assembly Constituency is Rudra Pratap Maharathy, son of Pradeep Maharathy of BJD. Pradeep Maharathy previously won 7 times from Pipili : 1985,1990, 2000, 2004, 2009, 2014 and 2019. He had won this seat representing BJD in 1990 and representing JNP in 1985. Bipin Das of INC(I) in 1980, and Kiran Lekha Mohanty of JNP in 1977.

Pipli is part of Puri (Lok Sabha constituency).
