= Yudhistir Samantray =

Indian politician (1953–2023)

Yudhistir Samantray (16 March 1953 – 16 October 2023) was an Indian National Congress politician and a member of the Odisha Legislative Assembly. The Odisha Police arrested him in May 2016 for the alleged murder of a youth leader.

Yudhistir Samantray died in Bhubaneswar on 16 October 2023, at the age of 70.
