= Puri district =

- District of Odisha
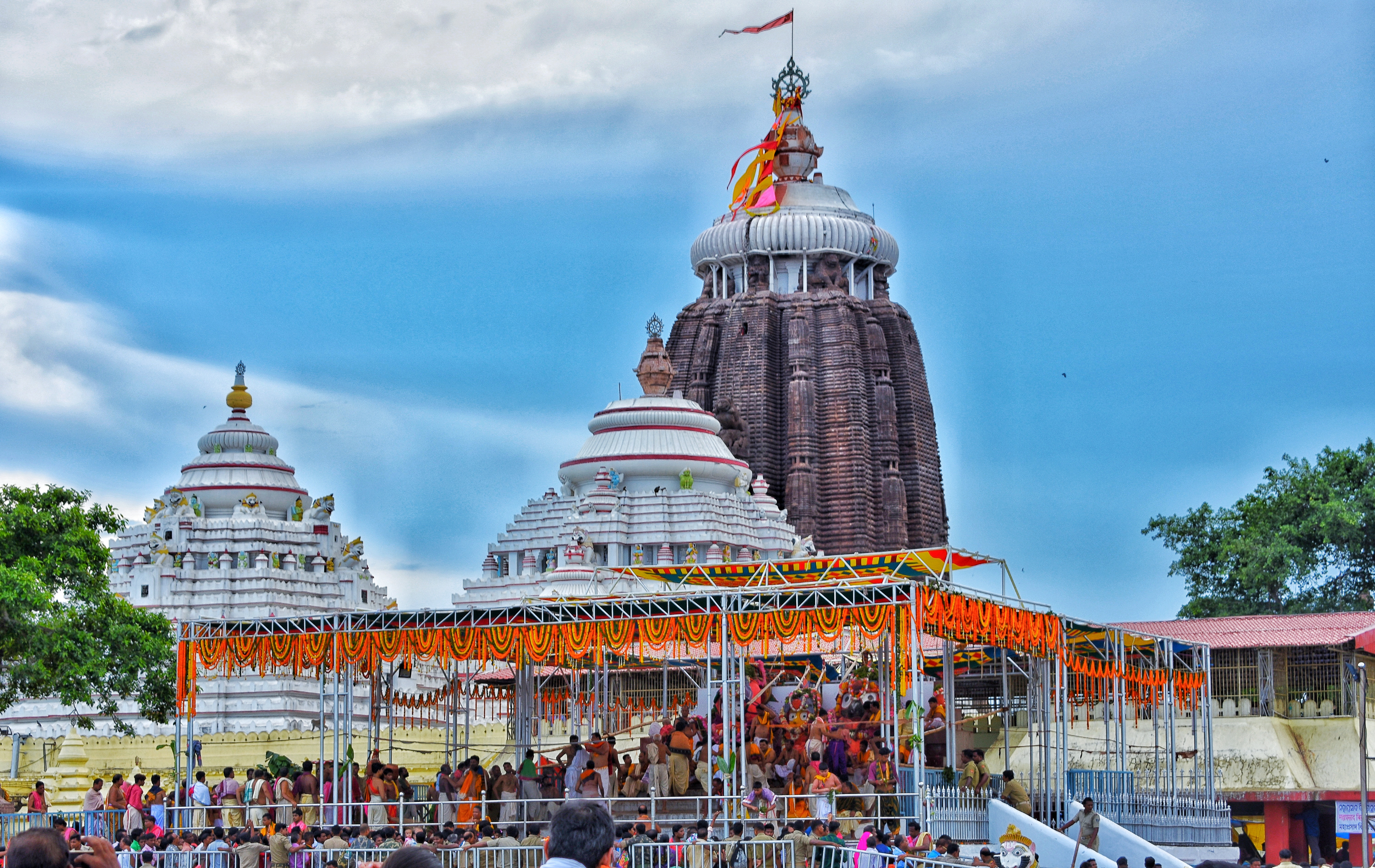
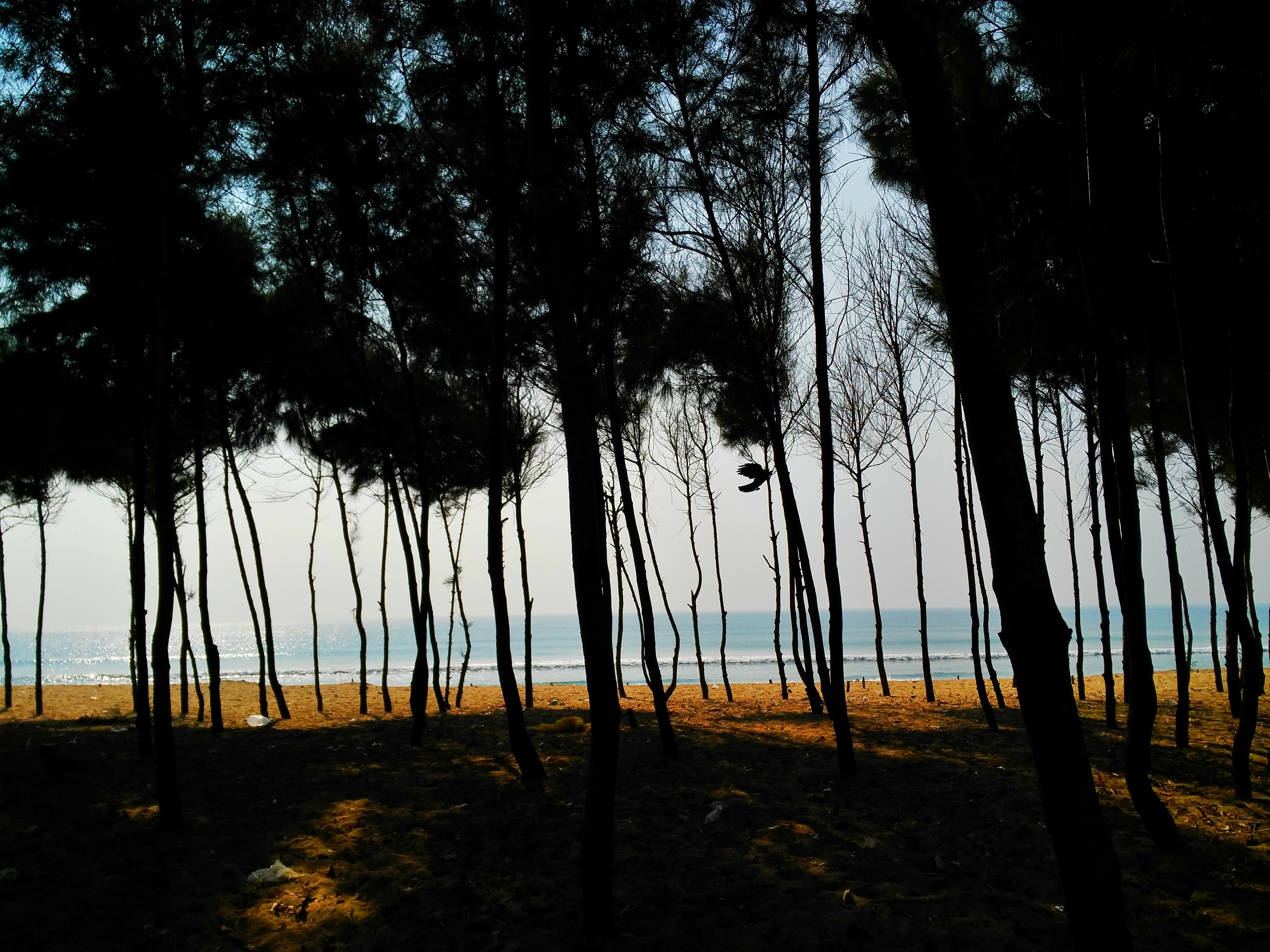
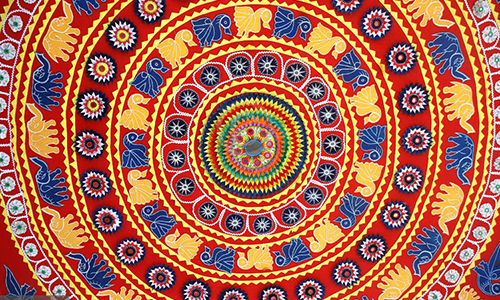
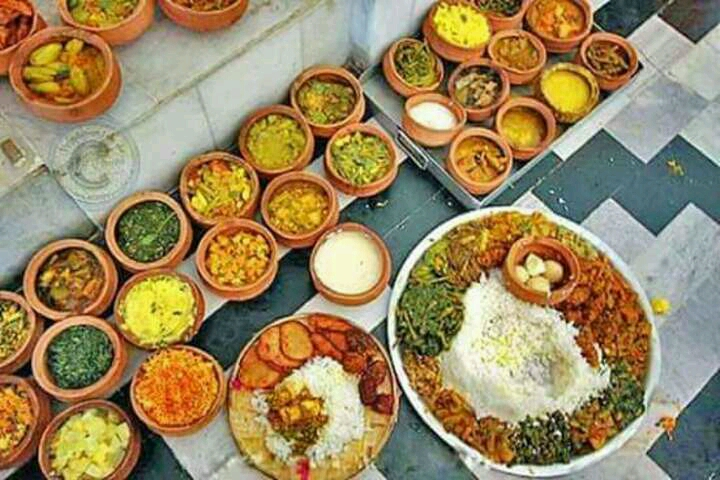
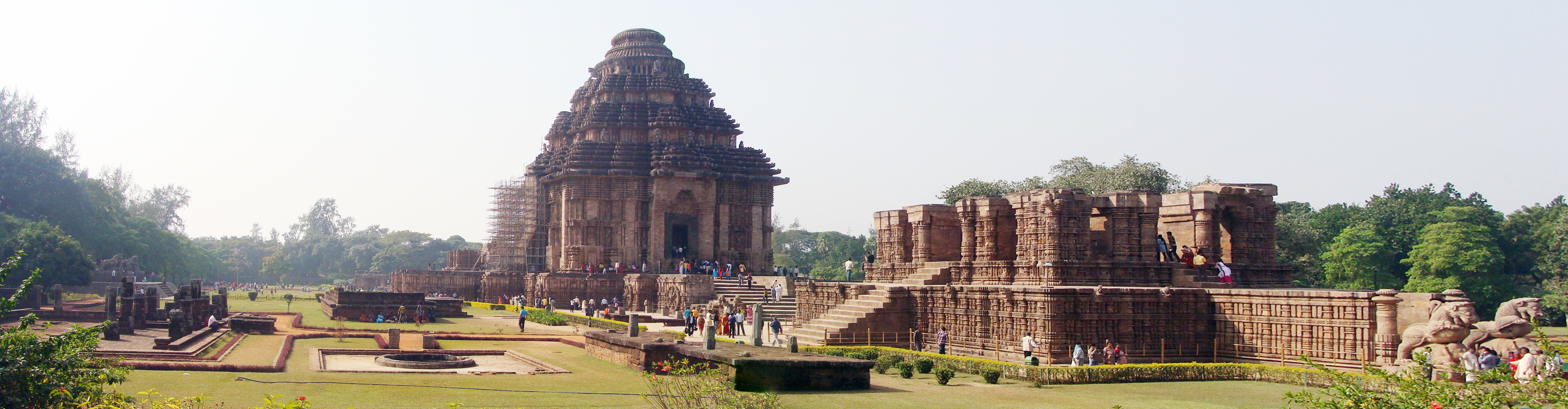
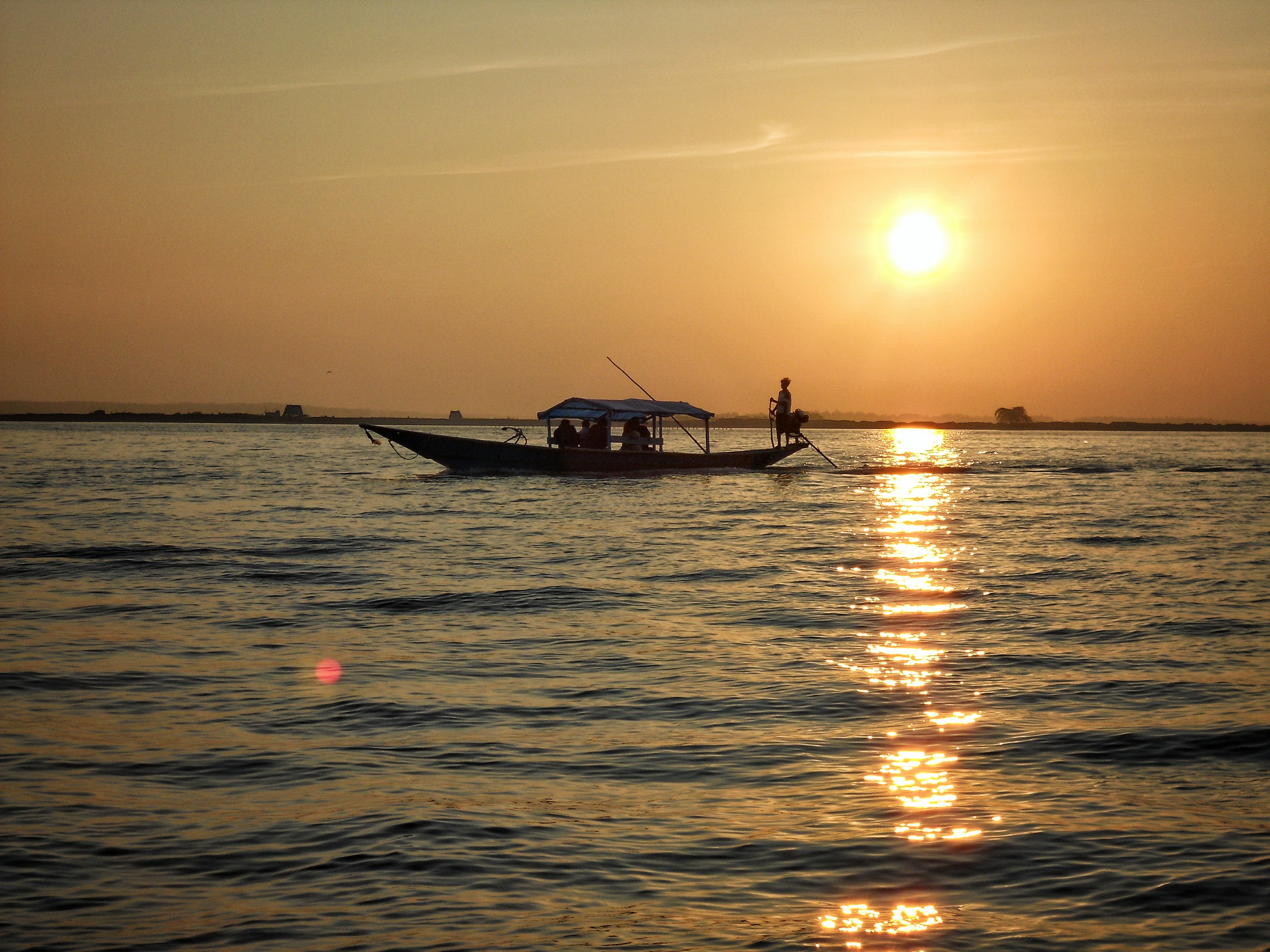
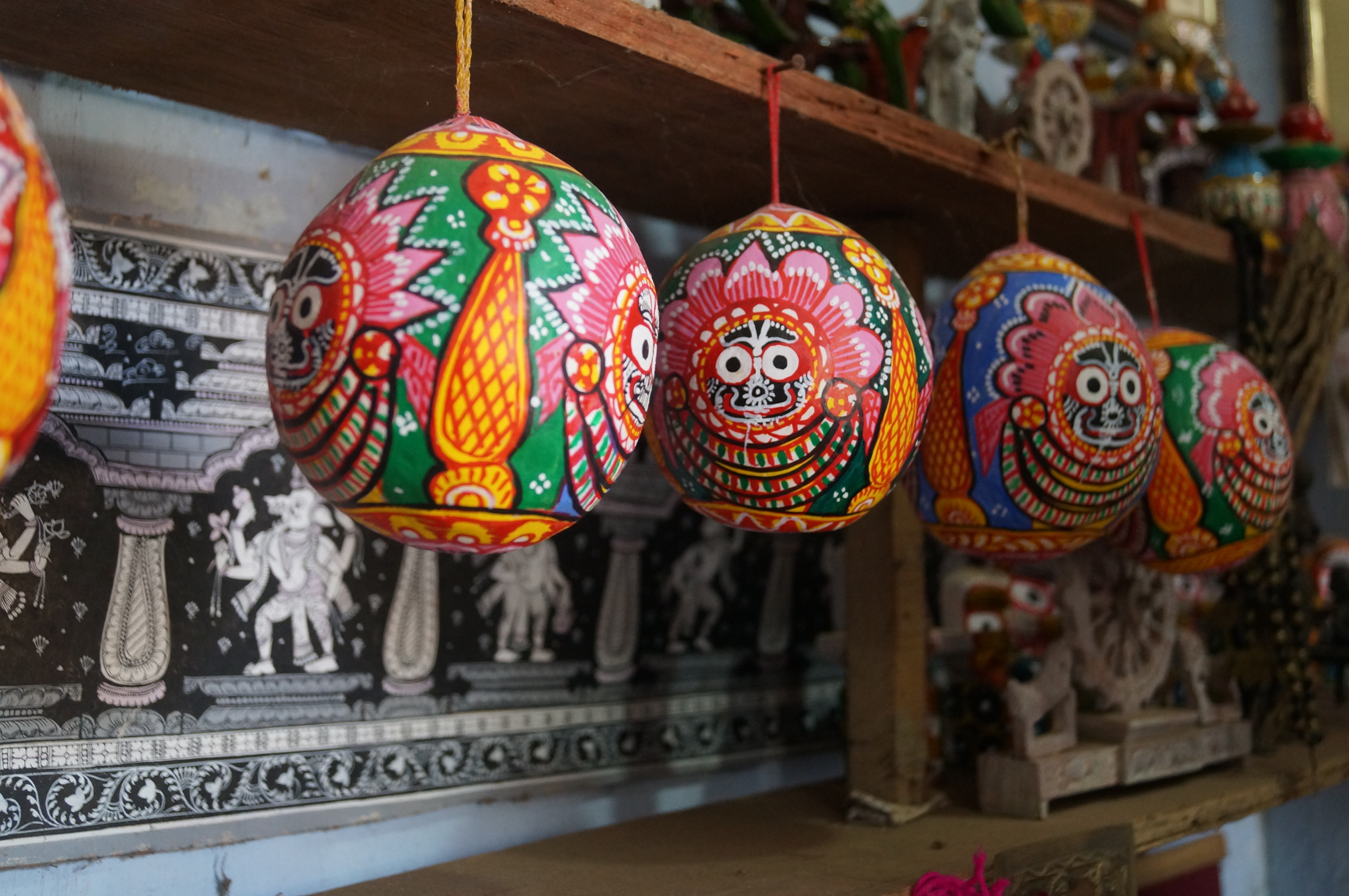
- Clockwise from top: Jagannath Temple, Puri, Chandrabhaga Beach, Pipili Applique Work, Mahaprasad (Jagannath Temple), Konark Sun Temple, Chilika Lake, Raghurajpur Pattachitra

- Location in Odisha
- Coordinates: 19.816°N 85.833°E
- Country: India
- State: Odisha
- Headquarters: Puri

Government
  - Collector & District Magistrate: Siddhartha Sankara Swain, IAS
  - Superintendent of Police: Pinaka Misra, IPS

Area
  - Total: 3,479 km^{2} (1,343 sq mi)

Population (2011)
  - Total: 1,698,730
  - Density: 488.3/km^{2} (1,265/sq mi)

Languages
  - Official: Odia, English
- Time zone: UTC+5:30 (IST)
- PIN: 752 xxx
- Vehicle registration: OD-13
- Coastline: 150.4 kilometres (93.5 mi)
- Nearest city: Bhubaneswar
- Sex ratio: 1.032 ♂/♀
- Literacy: 85.37%
- Lok Sabha constituency: Puri, Jagatsinghpur
- Vidhan Sabha constituency: 6: 105-Kakatpur(SC) 106-Nimapara 107-Puri 108-Brahmagiri 109-Satyabadi 110-Pipili
- Climate: Aw (Köppen)
- Avg. summer temperature: 37 °C (99 °F)
- Avg. winter temperature: 13.9 °C (57.0 °F)
- Website: www.puri.nic.in

Puri district is a coastal district of the Odisha state of India. It has one sub-division, 11 tahasils and 11 blocks and comprises 1722 revenue villages. Puri is the only Municipal Corporation of the district. Konark, Nimapada, Pipili and Satyabadi are the NACs while Brahmagiri and Kakatpur are semi-urban towns.

== Name ==
The district is named after its capital city, Puri. In Sanskrit, the word "Puri" means town or city. The city is an important seat of Vaishnavism, and is home to the noted Jagannath Temple built by Anantavarman Chodaganga in the mid 12th century CE.

== History ==
=== Pre-history ===
Like many other parts of Odisha, the Puri district contains Pleistocene river gravels and silts. So far, no prehistoric stone tools have been found in this region, although they are found in similar formations (river gravels, secondary laterite pits and murrams) in the nearby districts of Dhenkanal, Mayurbhanj, Kendujhar and Sundergarh.

=== Early records ===
In the dramatic poem Anargharāghava, believed to date from approximately the 9th century CE, the town of Puri was called Purusottama. The name of the town is given as Purusottama Kshetra in the records of Anangabhima Deva III from the 13th century CE. The town was given this name, or Purusottama Chhatar or simply Chhatar, in the records of the Mughal Empire, the Maratha Empire, and the early British rulers. In the Yogini Tantra and the Kalika Purana the town is referred to as Purusottam, and the Puri region was known as Utkal.

Purusottama Kshetra became referred to as Purusottama Puri, then contracted into Kshetra or Chhatra, or simply Puri. In many early British records this town is known by the name Pooree.

=== History of the District as an administrative unit ===
Under Mughal Rule (1592–1751), Odisha was divided into three circars for the purpose of revenue administration, Jaleswar, Bhadrak and Kataka. Current-day Puri was part of Kataka circar. After the Marathas occupied Odisha in 1751, they divided Odisha into the Pipli, Kataka, Soro and Balasore chakalas. The chakala of Pipli included major portions of the modern district of Puri.

After the conquest of Odisha by the British in 1803, the province was divided into the Northern and Southern Divisions with the river Mahanadi forming the boundary. Robert Ker and Charles Groeme were appointed as judge, magistrate, and collector in Northern and Southern Divisions respectively. By 1805 both divisions were amalgamated; Groeme was replaced, and Ker became the judge and magistrate of the whole province. By 1818 the Office of the Commissioner was established and Robert Ker became the first commissioner.

In October 1828, the province was divided into three districts, Balasore, Cuttack and Jagannath, which was later renamed Puri. In 1912, the new province of Bihar and Orissa was formed, including these three districts. Orissa (now Odisha) became a separate province in 1936 and was merged with the states of Nayagarh, Daspalla, Khandapara and Ranapur in 1948. A separate sub-division comprising these ex-states was added to Puri district, with headquarters at Nayagarh. Bhubaneswar was merged with the district in 1959. At this point the district comprised four sub-divisions: Puri Sadar, Khurdha, Bhubaneswar and Nayagarh.

By 1995, the area previously known as the Puri district was divided into three new districts:

- Nayagarh district, comprising the old Nayagarh sub-division;
- Khordha district, comprising the old Khuradha and Bhubaneswar sub-divisions; and
- Puri district, comprising the old Puri Sadar sub-division.

== Geography ==
The Puri district lies around the latitudes 19° and longitudes 84°29'E. It has a geographical area of 3051 km^{2} or 264988 Ha. It has varied geographical and geological divisions defined by rock types, soil, vegetation, water bodies and climate. The primary geological division is between the littoral tract and the level alluvial tract.

i) The littoral tract: This strip of the country lies between the level alluvial tract and the Bay of Bengal. Strong monsoon currents blow over the country for nearly 8 months of the year, producing sandy ridges parallel to the coast, varying from 6.5 km to a few hundred metres in width. These ridges stretch along the seashore for the full length of the sea coast, approximately 150 km long. The littoral tract forms the dividing line between the Chilika Lake and the ocean.

ii) The level alluvial tract: The alluvial region is full of villages and rice fields, watered by a network of channels, through which the distributaries of the most southerly branch of the Mahanadi river find their way to the sea.

=== River system ===
The rivers of Puri district are generally tributaries of the Mahanadi river. They are largely dry or seasonal small streams in the hot season, while in the rains they receive more water than they can carry. Major rivers include:

1) Kushabhadra River: A branch of the Kuakhai River originates from Balianta and meets the Bay of Bengal at the shrine of Ramachandi, located 15 miles east of Puri. Its tributary Mugei joins with Kushabhadra.

2) Daya River: A branch of the Kuakhai river drains into the Chilika lake. Two small rivers, the Gangua and the Managuni, join with the Daya river below Kanas. The Daya river is believed to be the cause of silt build-up in Chilika Lake.

3) Bhargavi River: A branch of the Kuakhai river meets the Bay of Bengal after breaking up into numerous tributaries in the last two and a half miles of its course. Four main branches, the Kanchi, the East Kania, the Naya Nadi and the South Kanchi (which drains into Sar Lake) all derive from the left bank of the Kuakhai. The first three of these interconnect through several channels and finally join the Suna Munhi river, which in turn joins the Baliharchandi and ultimately drains to the Bay of Bengal via the mouth of Chilika. The South Kania dissipates in the marshes on the western shore of Chilika.

4) Kadua River: This is a monsoon fed river that drains into the Prachi River.

5) Prachi River: This river has its origin near Kantapara on Cuttack-Gop road and passes through the Kakatpur before draining into the Bay of Bengal.

6) Devi River: This is a branch of the Kathajodi River.

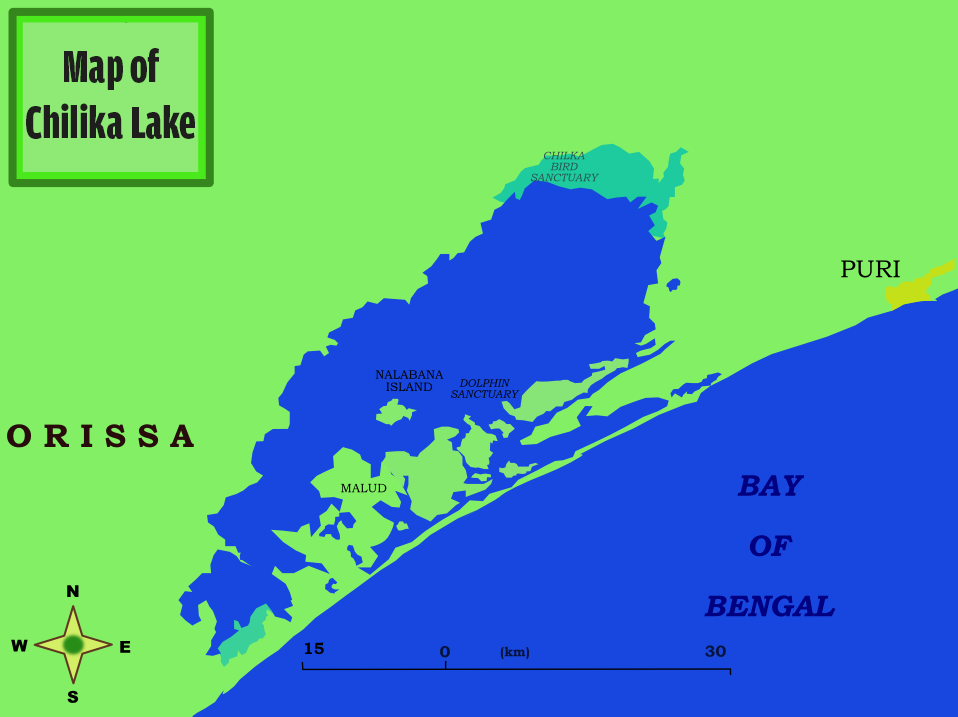
Map of lake Chilka with near-by settlement of Puri.

=== Beaches ===
Notable beaches include: Puri Beach; the Golden Beach; Beleswar Beach; Swargadwar Beach; Balighai Beach; and the Chandrabhaga Sea Astaranga beach.

== Demographics ==
Historical population
Year	Pop.	±%
1901	527,283	—
1911	537,636	+2.0%
1921	483,649	−10.0%
1931	535,934	+10.8%
1941	579,192	+8.1%
1951	625,148	+7.9%
1961	736,118	+17.8%
1971	903,807	+22.8%
1981	1,105,471	+22.3%
1991	1,305,365	+18.1%
2001	1,502,682	+15.1%
2011	1,698,730	+13.0%
Source: Census of India

=== Population ===
According to the 2011 Census, Puri district had a population of 1,698,730, roughly equal to the nation of Guinea-Bissau or the U.S. state of Idaho, making it the 291st most populous district in India out of 640. The district has a population density of 488 inhabitants per square kilometer (1,260/sq mi) and experienced a population growth rate of 13% over the decade from 2001 to 2011. The gender ratio stands at 963 females for every 1,000 males, with 865,380 males and 833,350 females. Approximately 15.60% of the population lives in urban areas. Scheduled Castes and Scheduled Tribes constitute 19.14% and 0.36% of the population, respectively. Among people aged 15 to 29 years, 68% were never married, 31.5% were currently married, and 0.3% were widowed.

=== Education ===
The literacy rate in Puri district was 84.67%, according to the 2011 Census. The male literacy rate was recorded at 90.85%, while the female literacy rate stood at 78.28%. In rural areas, the literacy rate was 84.16%, compared to 87.38% in urban areas.

=== Religion ===
Religions in Puri district (2011)
Religion	Percent
Hinduism	96.83%
Islam	2.71%
Other or not stated	0.46%

Religion by Tehsil (Sub-district)
Tehsil (Sub-district)	Total population	Hindu (%)	Muslim (%)
Delanga	109,291	97.95	1.88
Pipili	159,750	93.55	5.57
Nimapada	208,139	95.28	4.46
Kakatpur	100,525	86.67	13.18
Astaranga	67,748	99.36	0.28
Konark	54,999	98.28	0.44
Gop	121,665	95.69	4.19
Ramachandi	22,531	99.47	0.01
Satyabadi	196,136	98.87	1.01
Chandanpur	87,953	99.79	0.05
Puri Sadar	107,735	99.51	0.34
Brahmagiri	132,319	97.34	2.08
Gadisagada	71,870	99.88	0.03
Krushna Prasad	57,505	99.21	0.71

=== Language ===
Languages of Puri district (2011)
1. Odia (95.1%)
2. Urdu (2.36%)
3. Telugu (1.92%)
4. Others (0.63%)

At the time of the 2011 census, 95.09% of the population spoke Odia, 2.36% Urdu and 1.92% Telugu as their first language.

== Culture and tradition ==
Puri's recorded history dates from the third century BCE, and the district has varied religions and cultures. Hindus are in the majority, with monuments to Shaivism, Vaishnavism, Shaktism, Ganapatya, and Mahavir. Other important religious communities include Muslims, Sikhs, Jains and Christians.

=== Temples ===
Important monuments include:

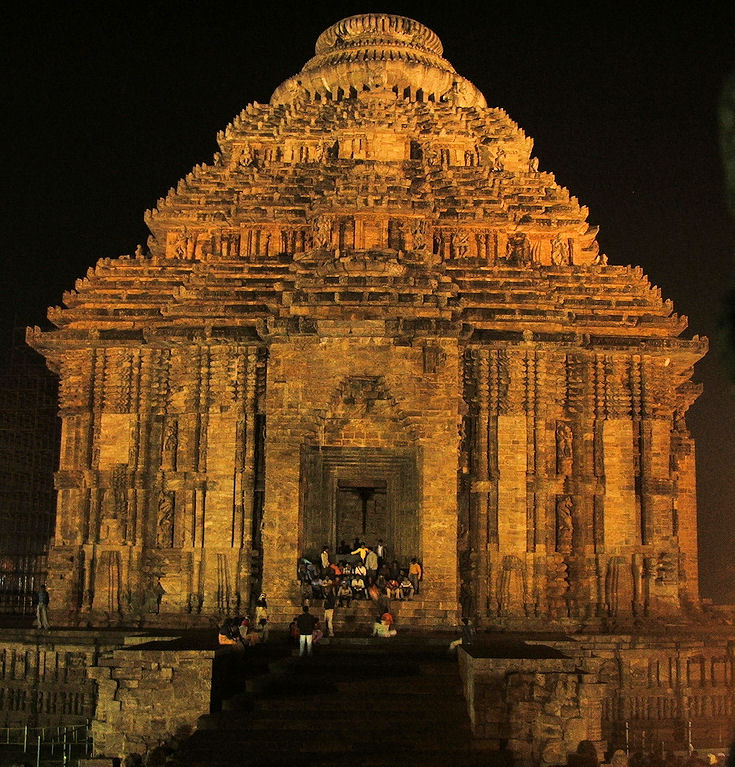
Konark Sun Temple

- Jagannath Temple, Puri
- Gundicha Temple, Puri
- Lokanatha Temple, Puri
- Jambeswar temple, Puri
- Sun Temple, Konark
- Barahi Temple, at Chourasi, in Nimapara Block
- Mangala Temple, Kakatpur
- Shiv Temple,Jiunti , Kakatpur
- Sakhigopal Temple, at Sakhigopal
- Amareswar Temple, at Amareswar, Nimapara Block
- Sculpture shed at Bishnupur, Nimapara
- Gramswar Temple, Terundia, Nimapara
- Alarnath Temple, Brahamgiri
- Baliharachandi Temple, Brahamagiri Block
- Kunteswar Temple, Araorh, Pipili Block
- Harihar Temple, near Pipili
- Shiva Temple, Jagadalpur at Delang Block
- Swapneswar Temple, Kendusahi at Satyabadi Block
- Baral Balunkeswar Temple at Satyabadi Block
- Dakhinakali Temple, Biragobindpur at Satyabadi Block
- Tara image at Badatara, Gop
- Bayalisbati Temple, near Gop
- Mohabir Temple, Siruli Sadar Block
- Sri Sri Bakreswar Temple at Balanga, Nimapara block
- Baba Balunkeswar Temple at Arisandha, Nimapara Block
- Nilakantha Temple and Chirnnamasta Temple at Biranarasinghpur Sasana.

=== Traditional Fairs and Festivals ===
==== Religious festivals ====
- Makar mela at Chilika, January
- Magha mela at Konark, January
- Maha Shivaratri, February
- Harirajpur Melan at Harirajpur, March
- Amla Navami at Sakshigopal, March
- Panchudola Balanga Melan at Balanga Melan field, Nimapara block, March
- Sahi Yatra for seven days from Rama Navami, March/April
- Chandan Yatra, April
- Siruli Mahavir Mela during Pana Sankranti, April
- Jhamu Yatra at Kakatpur, May
- Baliharachandi Mela at Brahmagiri during the Raja Festival, June
- Car Festival (Ratha Yatra), July
- Gosani Yatra, Dasahara, September/October
- Boita Bandan at Konark, October/November
- Dayana chori at Ghorodia in Pipili Block
- Anavasara at Alarnatha Mandira, Brahamagiri.
- Snana Purnima celebration of Jagannath and Naga Jatra for three days at Rupadeipur, Pipli.
- Sitala sasthi yatra at Biranarasinghpur sasana.

Tourist Festivals

- Konark Music & Dance Festival: Konark Natya Mandap, February
- Basant Utshav: Parampara Raghurajpur, February
- Sri Ksetra Mohotsav: Puri, April
- Gundicha Utsav: Puri, June
- Puri Beach Festival: Puri, November
- Konark festival: Konark, December
- Astaranga baliyatra (kartika Purnima): jahania,Astaranga ,October or November

These festivals feature Odissi dance and folk dances from different parts of the country.

=== Dance and music ===
The role of dance and music in temple rituals in Puri was important enough to set aside a separate enclosure, the Nata mandira, as a focal point. Nata mandiras are typically decorated with figures in various poses of dance and musicians playing a variety of instruments.

==== Odissi dance ====
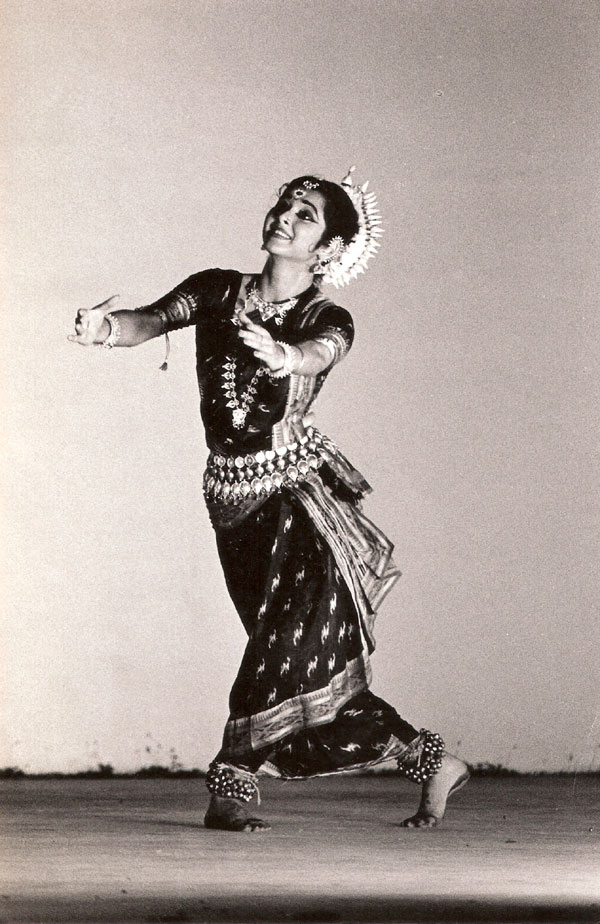
Sharmila Biswas performing Odissi in a dance festival in Kerala

Odissi dance is an ancient Indian classical dance form that originated in the Hindu temples of Odisha. Traditionally this dance form was taught to the devadasi (female temple dancers). In Odissi dances, the artists play out a mythical story, a spiritual message or devotional poem from the Hindu texts, such as Jayadev's Gita Govinda. After the abolition of the devadasi system, the traditional forms of the dance fell into disuse. Padmashri Guru Kelucharan Mahapatra was one of the gurus who revived the Odissi dance form in the mid-20th century.

=== Odissi music ===
Orissi music is a genre of Indian classical music originating from Puri. It is believed to date back to the 2nd century BCE, when Kharavela, king of Odisha, acted as a patron for this form of music and dance.

==== Mahari dance ====
Mahari is a ritualistic dance form that was historically performed at the temple of Lord Jagannatha at Puri by devadasi dancers called maharis. After the abolition of the devadasi system, it is no longer danced at the Jagannatha Temple but continues as a cultural dance.

===== Folk dances =====
Gotipua dance is a folk dance of Puri, danced by boys under 14 years old, clad in female dress. The boys perform acrobatic figures inspired by the life of Radha and Krishna. The village of Raghurajpur is known for its Gotipua dance troupes.

Naga dances are danced by men wearing a heavy, elaborate costume including huge, highly decorated headgear and a false beard almost covering the face.

Medha dances are traditional dances in which the dancers wear a huge papier-mâché mask representing a demon or other character. Medha dancers participate in processions of temple idols on festival days such as Rama Navami.

==== Other folk dances ====
Other folk dances common in the district include Ghoda nacha, Dhuduki nacha, Jatra, Pala, Daskathia, Bhalu nacha, Mankada nacha and Navrang.

=== Other notable sites ===
==== Archeological Sites ====
Excavated archeological sites in Puri district include:

- Kuruma or Kurum - This site is 8 km from Konark and contains the remains of a Buddhist monastery from the 10th century CE.
- Manikapatana - This site is on the left bank of the Kushabhadra river, at the northern end of the Chilika Lake. It has been identified as the medieval port of Chelitalo described by the Chinese pilgrim Hiuen Tsang.
- Khalkatapatna - on the Puri-Konark Marine Drive road is an ancient port that shows evidence of trade with Arabia and China in the 13th-15th centuries CE.

==== Theatres ====
Annapurna Theatre is a pioneer in the field of theatrical performances.

==== District museum Puri ====
The District Museum at Puri is one of the branch museums of Odisha State Museum and is managed by the state government. It was established in 1997.

==== Libraries ====
The District Library of Puri and Panchasakha Memorial hall Library, Sakshigopal are both managed by the state government's department of culture.

=== Puri district Culture Office ===
The Puri district Culture Office promotes cultural activities and implements government policy relating to art and culture. This office manages the District Library of Puri, Panchasakha Memorial Hall Library at Sakhigopal, and the District museum of Puri. It organises cultural programmes and offers grants to registered libraries, cultural institutions, and indigent artists. It also serves as the liaison to the Orissa Sahitya Academy and the Sangeet Natak Akademi.

== Politics ==
The Odisha Legislative Assembly constituencies of Puri district and their elected members are listed below.

No.	Constituency	Reservation	Extent of the Assembly Constituency (Blocks)	Member of 15th Assembly	Party
105	Kakatpur	SC	Konark (NAC), Kakatpur, Astarang, Gop (part)	Tusharkanti Behera	BJD
106	Nimapara	None	Nimapara (NAC), Nimapara, Gop (part)	Pravati Parida	BJP
107	Puri	None	Puri (M), Puri Sadar (part), Gop (part)	Sunil Kumar Mohanty	BJD
108	Brahmagiri	None	Brahmagiri, Krushnaprasad, Puri Sadar (part)	Upasana Mohapatra	BJP
109	Satyabadi	None	Satyabadi, Kanas	Om Prakash Mishra	BJP
110	Pipili	None	Pipili (NAC), Pipili, Delanga	Ashrit Pattanayak	BJP

== Notable people ==
- Gopabandhu Das
- Nilakantha Das
- Kelucharan Mohapatra
- Manasi Pradhan
- Raghunath Mohapatra
- Sudarshan Patnaik
- Alekh Patra
