= Maritime history of Odisha =

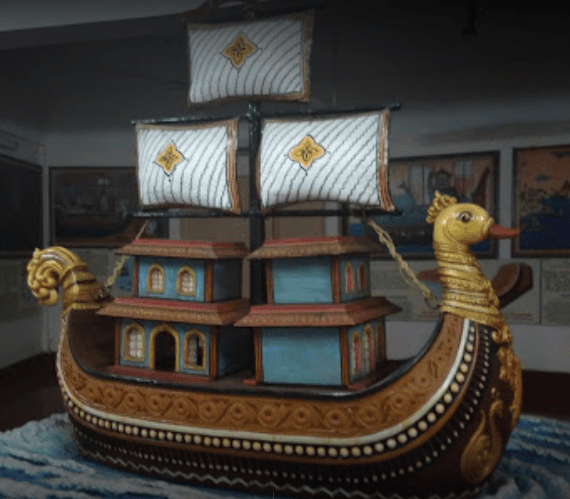
Boita replica at Odisha Maritime museum

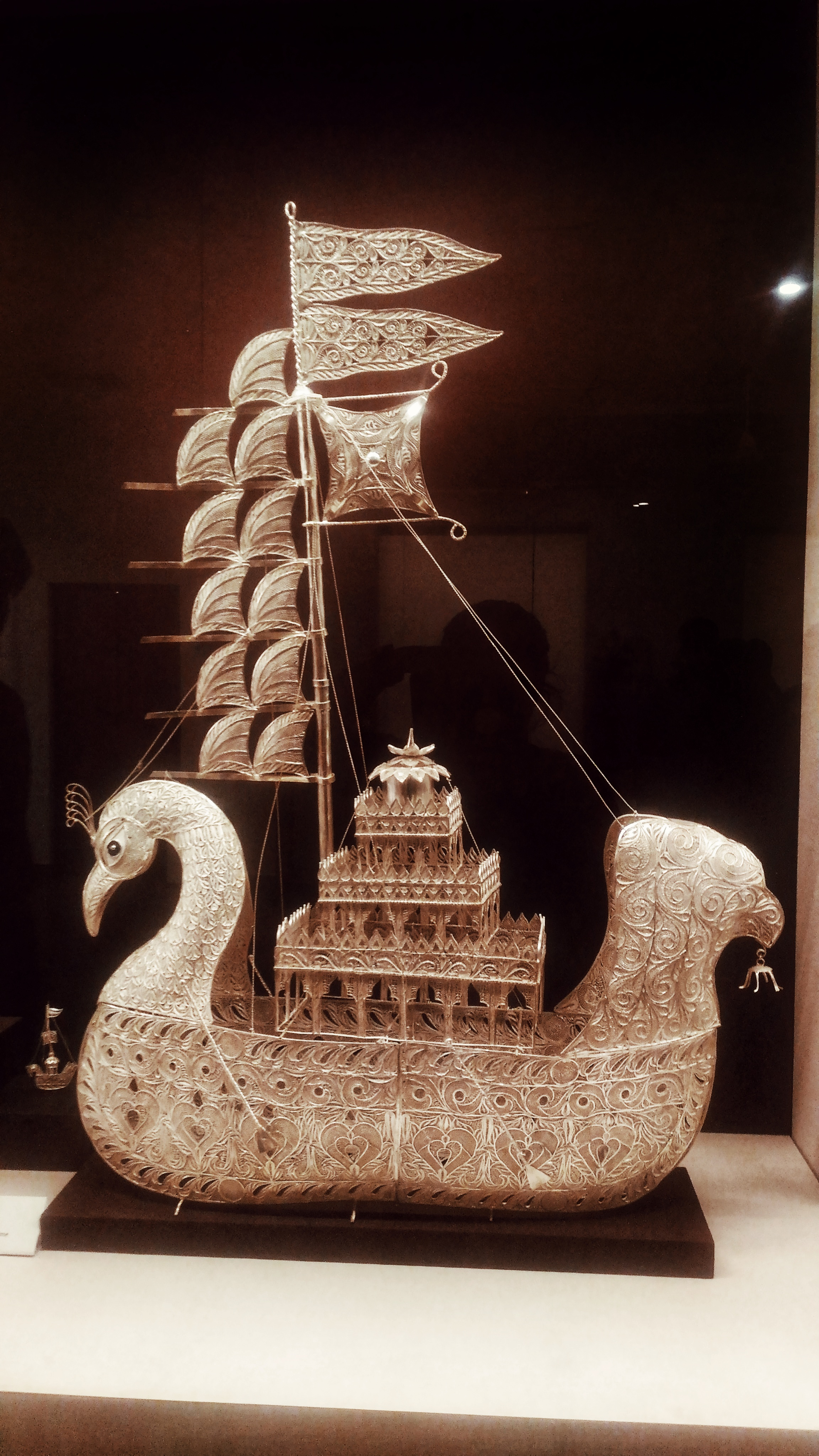
Silver filigree of a boita at Odisha Crafts Museum

The Maritime history of Odisha, (Note: "Odiya:ଓଡ଼ିଶାର ସାମୁଦ୍ରିକ ଇତିହାସ [Oḍisāra Sāmudrika Itihāsa]) known as Kalinga in ancient times, started much before 800 BC according to early sources. The people of this region of eastern India along the coast of the Bay of Bengal sailed up and down the Indian coast. They travelled to Indo China and throughout Maritime Southeast Asia, introducing elements of their culture to the people with whom they traded. The 6th century Manjusrimulakalpa mentions the Bay of Bengal as Kalingodra and in ancient Classical India, the Bay of Bengal was known as Kalinga Sagar (Kalinga Sea), indicating the importance of Kalinga in the maritime trade. The old traditions are still celebrated in the annual Boita Bandana festival including its major celebration at Cuttack on the banks of Mahanadi river called Bali Jatra, and is held for seven days in October–November at various coastal districts, most famous at Cuttack though.

== Location ==
Located on the eastern coast of India, the ancient state of Kalinga extended from the Ganges to the Godavari River, including parts of modern Odisha, Andhra Pradesh, and surrounding areas. According to political scientist Sudama Misra, the Kalinga janapada originally comprised the area covered by the Puri and Ganjam districts. The navigable rivers, including the Ganges, Mahanadi, Vamsadhara and Godavari provided access to the interior, where precious and semi-precious stones were found, and their deltas provided natural harbours. From these harbours, the people of the region traded by sea with Ceylon in the south, with Burma in the east, and further afield with the states of the Maritime Southeast Asia, Indochina, and China. The maritime activity of Kalinga was so extensive that what is now called the Bay of Bengal was once called the Sea of Kalinga.

The coastline is unstable. The southwest monsoon carries sediment along the coast, at times forming bars and spits that protect the harbours, at other times eroding the protective breakwaters. The rivers carry silt, extending their deltas and filling the former harbours. For this reason, some of the ports named in ancient times no longer exist or have greatly declined. For example, Chilika Lake was an important harbour but later became unusable for deep-water vessels due to silting.

== Ports ==
There were two types of ports in Early Odisha. The categorisation was based on location. They are the following:

- Pattana- These ports were situated on the sea coast where cargoes were loaded and unloaded.
- Dronimukha- These ports were situated near the confluence of the river and sea.

Some of the ports mentioned by the geographer Ptolemy in the 2nd century AD were Nanigaina (Puri), Katikardama (Kataka) and Kannagara (Konarak). The important ports on the Kalinga coastline were Tamralipta, Khalkatapatna, Manikapatna (Chelitalo), Palur (Dantapura), Gopalpur (Mansurkota), Dosarene, Sonapur, Baruva (Barua), Kalingapatnam, Pithunda. Later in the 9th and 10th centuries CE, Arab sources mention Ganjam, Kalinganagar, Keylkan, Al-Lava and Nubin. After the 15th century, ports included Balasore, Pipili, Ganjam, Harishapur, Chandabali and Dhamra.

== Early history ==
Roman trade with India according to the Periplus Maris Erythraei (1st century CE).

Excavations at Golbai Sasan have shown a Neolithic culture dating to as early as ca. 2300 BC, followed by a Chalcolithic (copper age) culture and then an Iron Age culture starting around 900 BC. Tools found at this site indicate boat building, perhaps for coastal trade. Fish bones, fishing hooks, barbed spears, and harpoons show that fishing was an important part of the economy. Some artefacts from the Chalcolithic period are similar to those found in Vietnam, indicating possible early contact with Indochina.

Texts like the Jatakas and Ceylonese chronicles mention Dantapura and Simhapura, with Dantapura being a notable port. The Chinese traveler Hiuen Tsang referred to a coastal city called Che-li-ta-lo, identified as modern Puri. Early historical sources record that Kalinga became subject to Magadha in 362 BC, regained independence during a civil war in Magadha around 320 BC, but around 261 BC was conquered by the Maurya emperor Ashoka (269 BC to 232 BC). The site at Sisupalagarh, occupied from the 3rd century BC to the 4th century AD, has been identified with Tosali, the provincial capital of Ashoka, and with Kalinganagara, the capital city of Kalinga after it regained independence from Mauryan empire early in the 1st century BC during the reign of Kharavela. The history of the following centuries is complex. At times, the north and south of Kalinga were separate states; at other times, they were united. Sometimes Kalinga was independent, sometimes it was a tributary to a more powerful neighbour.

The Bhauma-Kara dynasty ruled over Utkal, as the northern and eastern part of Odisha was then known, from the 8th to 10th centuries AD. These rulers paid tribute to Gaudeshwar Devapala (810–850 AD), ruler of the Pala Empire of Bengal For a period, the rulers of Utkal were forced to acknowledge the suzerainty of the Tamil Chola dynasty under their king Rajendra Chola I (1012–1044), with whom they became allied by marriage. After regaining independence, Anantavarma Chodagangadeva (1078–1191) established control over a wide region from the Ganges to the Godavari, moving his capital from Kalinganagar to Cuttack. The power of Odisha waxed and waned over the following centuries, but it was not until 1568 that Odisha finally lost its independence.

== Ships ==
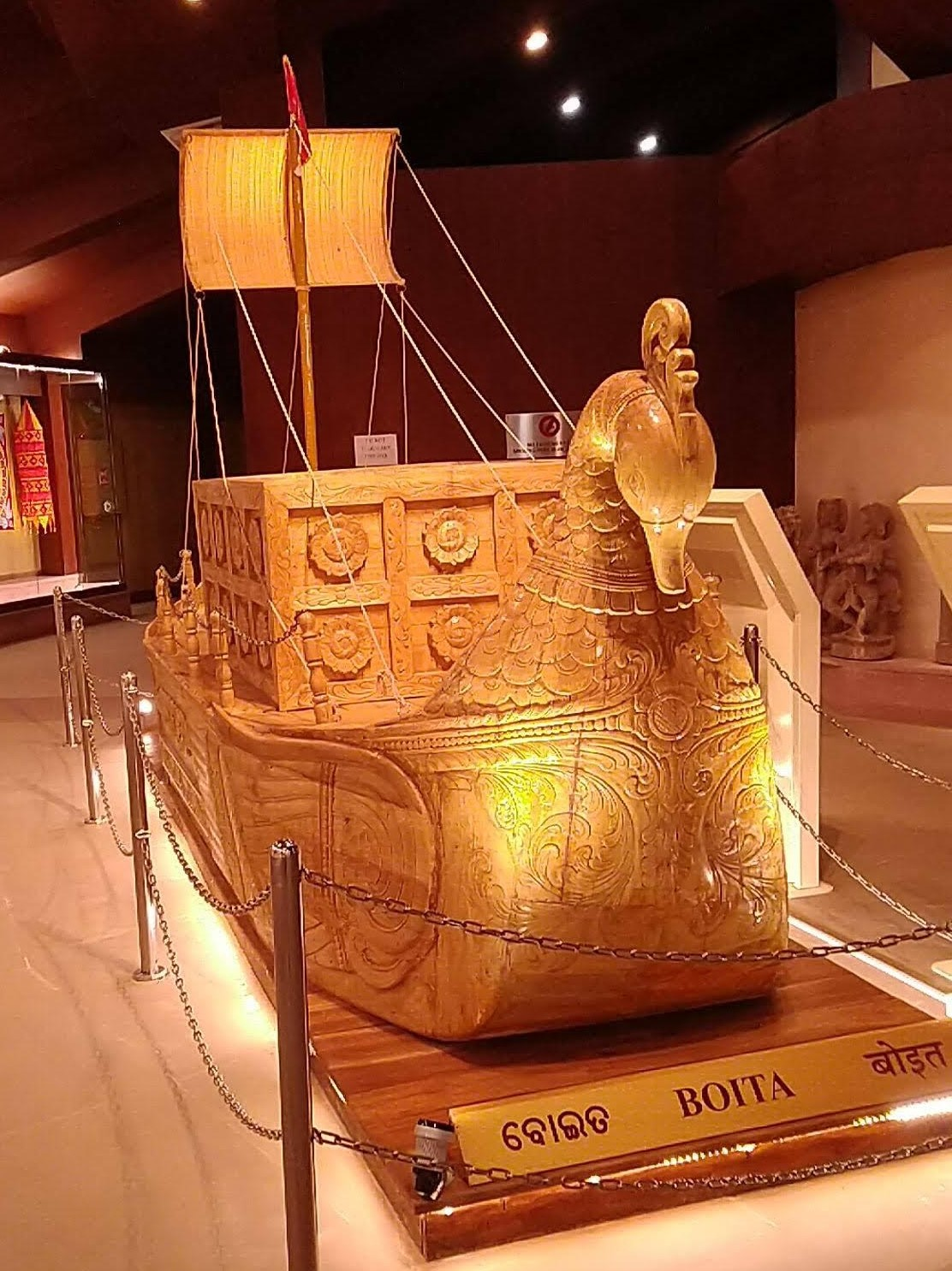
Model of a Boita at Konark ASI Museum

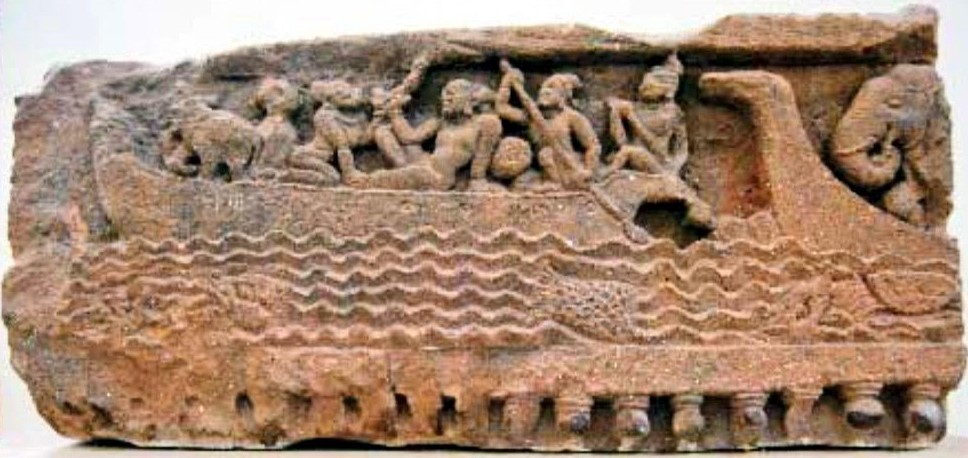
Sculptured frieze depicting two Boitas found near Brahmeswara Temple

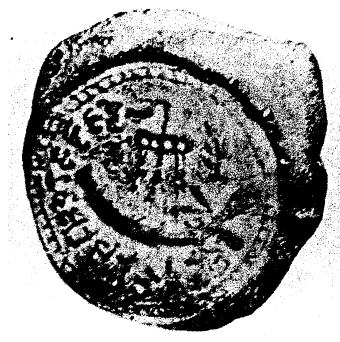
Terracotta seal depicting ship found in West Bengal, dated between 400 BCE and 100 BCE

Rules and regulations regarding the construction of ships were recorded in the Sanskrit Juktikalpataru (Yukti Kalpa Taru). The Madalapanji records that king Bhoja built many ships with local wood. The recovery of many woodworking adzes and other artefacts from Chilika Lake shows that Golabai was a boat-building center.

Terracotta seals from Bangarh and Chandraketugarh (400 BC to 100 BC) depict seagoing vessels containing corn. The ships have a single mast with a square sail. The earliest depiction of ships in Odisha is in a sculptured frieze showing two ships, found near the Brahmeswara Temple, Bhubaneswar, and now preserved in the Odisha State Museum. The first ship has standing elephants in the front part, two people seated in the center and two sailor with oars at the rear steering the ship.

== Sea routes ==
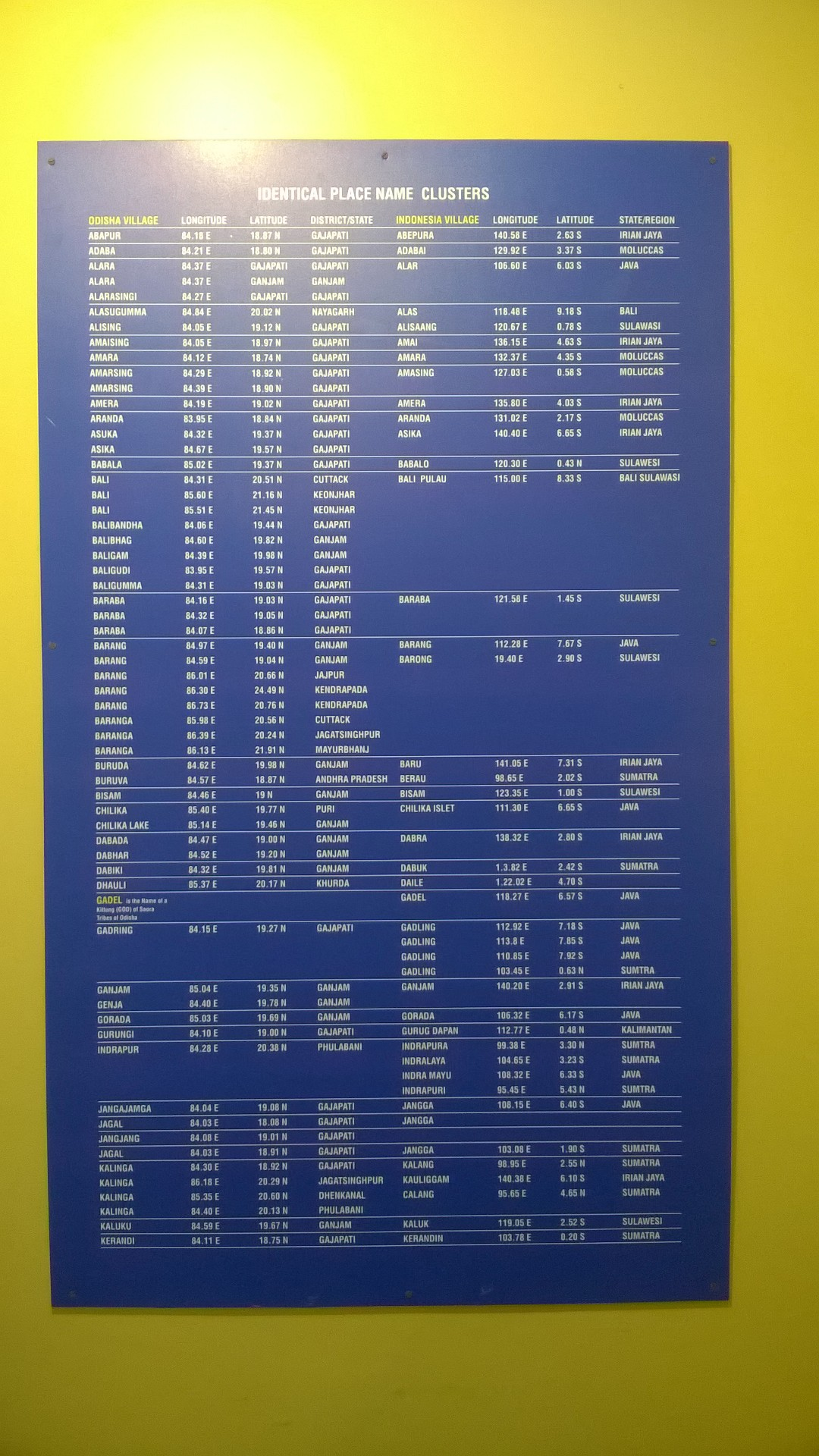
Identical places between Odisha and Indonesia mentioned at Odisha Maritime museum (Part-1)

From June to September the summer monsoons blow from the southwest, from Ceylon towards Kalinga. From December to early March, the retreating monsoon blows in the opposite direction. Southeast Asia has similar seasonal wind patterns.

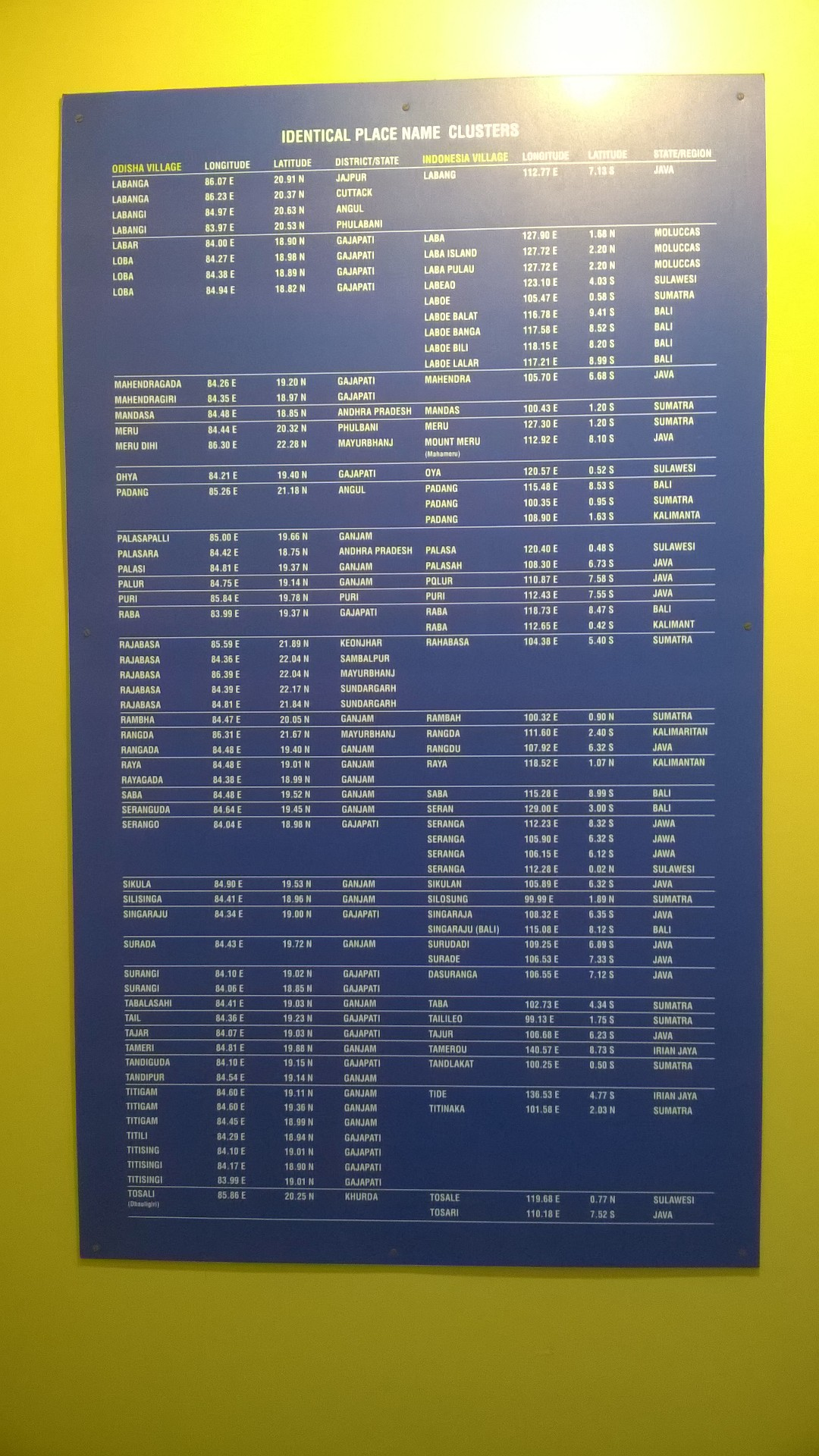
Identical places between Odisha and Indonesia mentioned at Odisha Maritime museum (Part-2)

Over Indonesia, in July and August, the winds blow from Australia in a northwesterly direction, shifting towards a northeasterly direction as they cross the equator. The pattern reverses during January and February. Early navigators would have exploited these seasonal winds, navigating by the stars, the color of the water, the presence of sea snakes, and observation of the flights of sea crows and other homing birds.

The ships of Kalinga were not able to make long sea voyages without stopping along the way for food and water. Ships outbound from Tamralipta would have followed the Burmese coast, stopping at the Nicobar Islands, a one-month journey. From there, they continued to the southeast, then sailed down the Malay Peninsula and through the strait of Malacca, and onward to Java or Bali, or headed northeast to Indochina or China. An alternative route was southward down the coast of India, perhaps stopping in Ceylon, then southeast to Sumatra.

== Trade ==
Palur, near the Rushikulya River in the Ganjam district, was an important port in the 2nd century AD. Archaeological exploration has unearthed fragments of Chinese celadon ware, Roman rouletted pottery, and amphora pieces, indicating that the port engaged in significant international trade. An unusual medallion has a Kushana-style king with a Brahmi inscription on one side, and a Roman head with a Roman inscription on the other. A Roman coin of the emperor Tiberius has been found at Salihundam, and other Roman coins have been found at other sites, giving further evidence of trade with the Roman Empire.

Trade with Southeast Asia was established by the 1st century AD, and may have had much earlier origins. Later findings include 12th-century Ceylonese coins and 14th-century Chinese coins. Similar coins from Kotchina in Sumatra point to a triangular trade between Odisha, Ceylon, and Sumatra. Trading was not without risks. The kings of Kalinga, Siam and Java had to periodically mount expeditions to put down Malay and Bugis pirates operating in the Strait of Malacca and throughout Maritime Southeast Asia.

Manikapatna was a port on the banks of Chilika that flourished from early historical times until the 19th century AD. Excavations have found many types of pottery from different parts of India, and coins from Ceylon and China. The more modern levels contain Chinese celadon and porcelain and Arabic-glazed pottery. An 18th-century Mosque has an inscription saying sailors and traders prayed there before setting out on their voyages.

According to a 6th-century AD source, Kalinga was famous for its elephants, for which it found a market in Ceylon, as well as for precious stones, ivory, pepper, betel nuts, and fine textiles. In return, Kalinga imported pearl and silver from Ceylon. Corn and rice were also exported. Traders imported spices and sandalwood from the east, some of it destined for onward transport to the Mediterranean market. A boat depicted in the Sun Temple of Konarak in the 13th century contains a giraffe, indicating trade with Africa, presumably carried on Arab vessels.

== Overseas contacts ==
=== Burma ===
Burma was known as Kalingarat (Kalinga Rastra) in the 7th century BC. There is evidence of very early settlement in the southern Mon region. By the 2nd century AD, the Kalingans were ruling Kalaymyo, the Arakan River valley and Pegu, around the gulf of Martaban. The remains of a ship excavated at Tante, near Yangon, are thought to have belonged to Kalingan traders. Place names and similarities in architecture also indicate close contacts across the gulf of Bengal. The Buddhagat, the sacred scripture of Burma, describes trade with the Buddhist merchants of Kalinga, leading to missionaries coming to propagate the faith, and then to Kalinga's political domination of parts of coastal Burma during the 4th to 7th centuries AD. Coins with Hindu symbols found in Pegu confirm this contact.

=== Cambodia ===
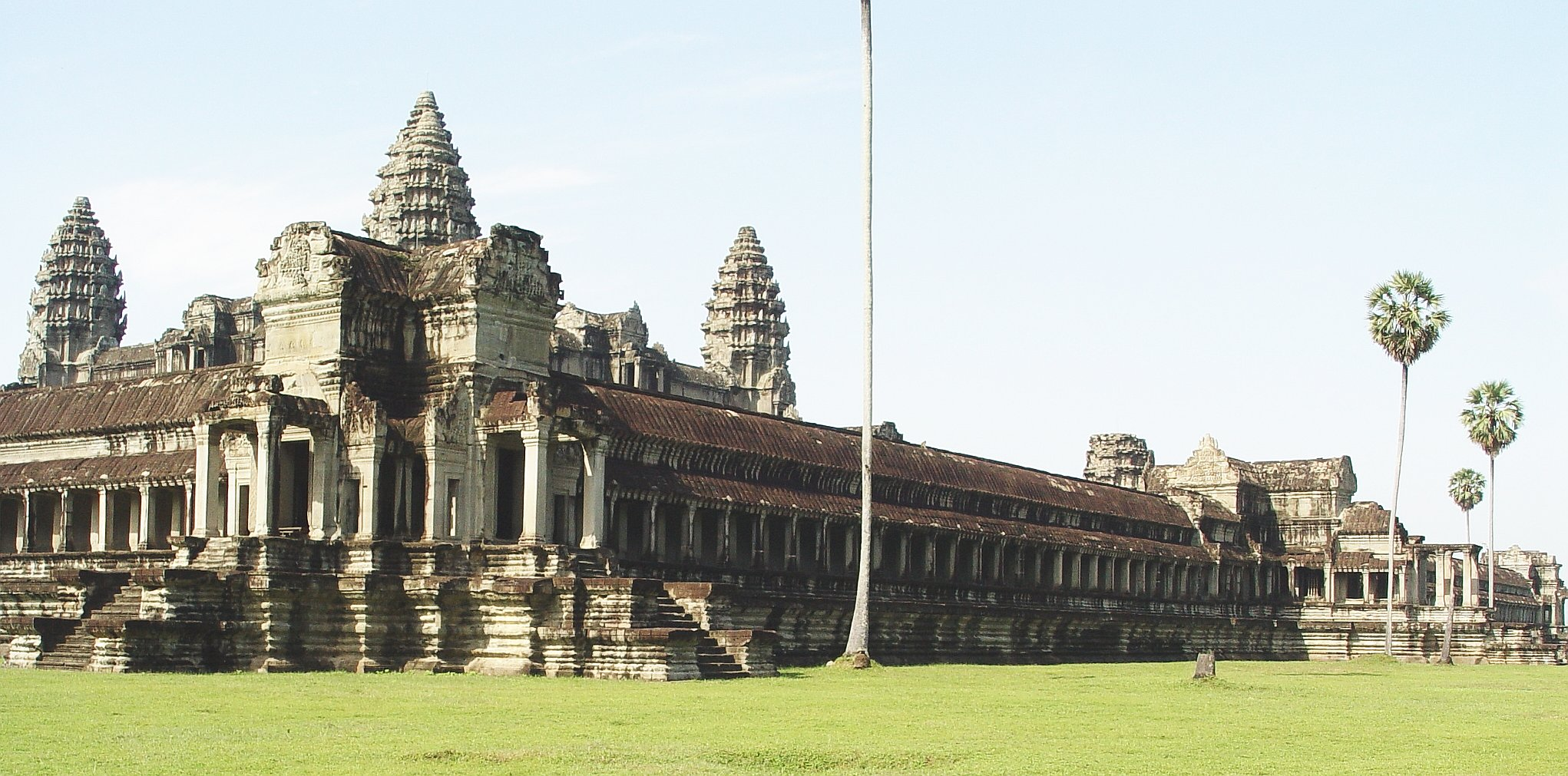
Angkor Wat viewed from the northwest

Emigrants from Kalinga came to Cambodia in the 3rd century BC, fleeing Emperor Ashoka. However, after Ashoka had converted to Buddhism and sent missionaries to Cambodia, they accepted the teachings and helped establish the religion in the region. The early monuments of the Khmers (of modern Cambodia) appear to be of Andhra origin rather than from Kalinga. However, although some of the inscriptions at Angkor Wat in Cambodia are in Sanskrit, others are in the Kalinga script. The design of the Angkor Wat temple shows influences from the Jagannath Puri temple of Odisha.

=== China ===
The first record of trade with China is found in the account of Fa Hien (399–411 AD), who sailed in a merchant vessel from the port of Temralipti back to China.

The Chinese pilgrim Hieun Tsang (645 CE) tells of sea voyages from the ports of Tamralipta (modern Tamluk) and Chelitalo to Simhala (modern Sri Lanka) and China. A former king of Odra (Odisha) named Subhakararisha, who had abdicated to become a monk, voyaged to China in 716 AD. and introduced Tantric Buddhism. There is an account of the carriage by sea in 794 AD of a present by the King of Udra to the Emperor of China.

Odisha imported silk from China, and a Chinese coin from the 8th century has been found at Sirpur. Between 813 and 818, three missions were sent from the Javanese nation of Kalinga to the court of Hsien Tung in China, bringing rarities such as a live rhinoceros, a five-coloured parrot and some black boys and girls from East Africa.

=== Sri Lanka ===
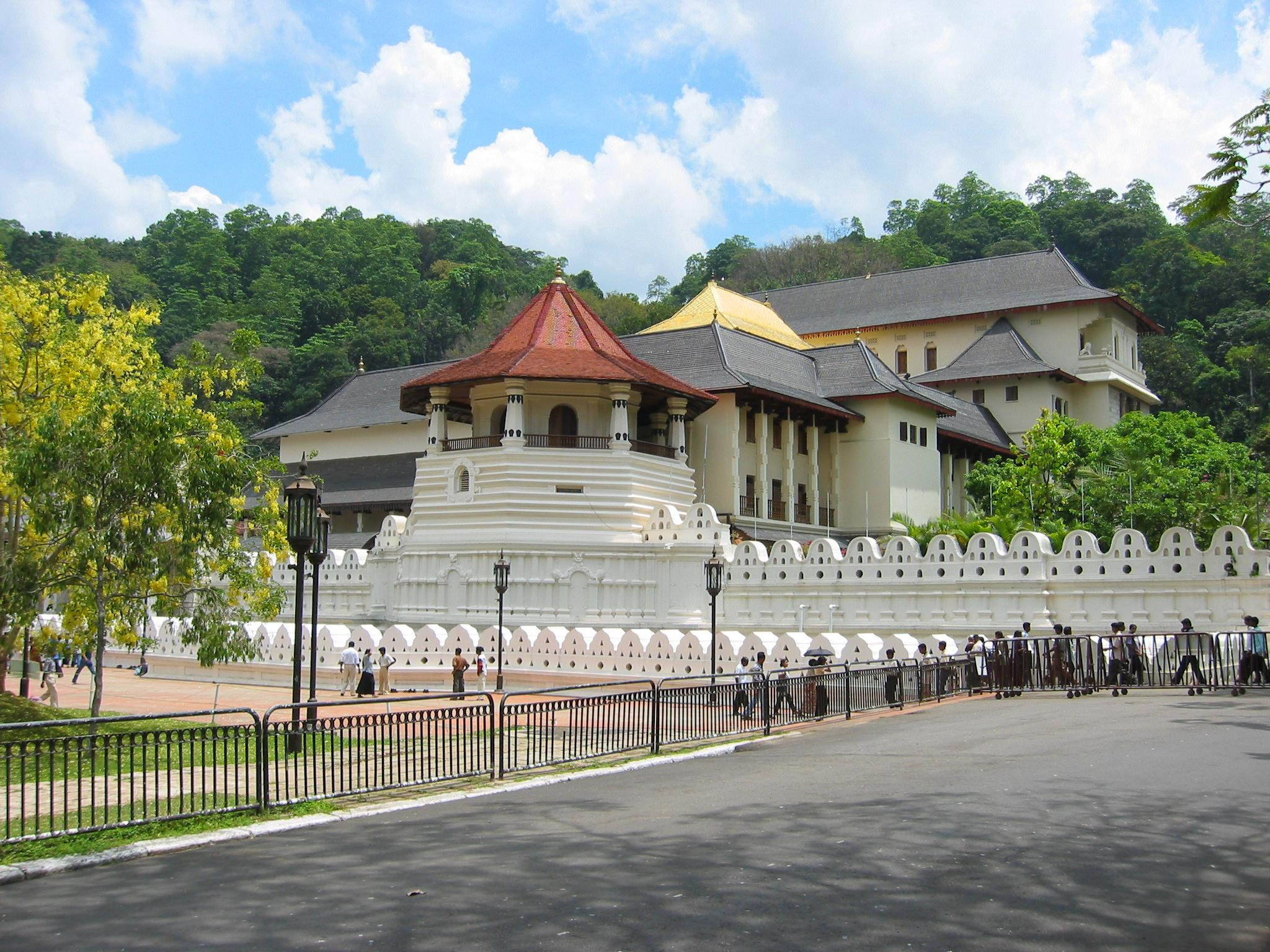
The Temple of the Tooth Relic in Kandy, Sri Lanka

Kalinga had strong ties with Simhala (Sri Lanka). Some scholars say that the first king of Simhala, Vijaya, came from Simhapura in eastern India, the capital of Kalinga, and that his grandmother was the daughter of Kalinga's king. The emperor Ashoka sent his son to Ceylon to establish Buddhism, and later sent his daughter Sanghamitra to organise the nuns. The Samantapasadika says that eight families from Kalinga accompanied her. The Dathavamsa talks of the friendship between king Guhasiva of Kalinga and king Mahasena of Ceylon (277 – 304 AD). It also mentions the king of Kalinga giving the tooth relic of Gautama Buddha as a dowry to Dantakumara upon his marriage to the king's daughter. Dantakumara took the relic to Ceylon, where it was enshrined in a stupa.

Hinayanic Buddhism flourished in Ceylon in the 4th and 5th centuries AD, and the influence of Ceylonese scholars spread through Burma, Siam, and Cambodia, establishing the beliefs and practices that continue in these countries today. Kalinga was also strongly influenced by Ceylonese culture, particularly the Theravada teachings of Buddhaghosa, since it lay along the route taken by pilgrims from Ceylon visiting holy places in India. Pilgrims from Kalinga sailed to Ceylon to honour the sacred tooth and visit the monasteries. The Chinese pilgrim Hieun Tsang describes these sea voyages from the port of Tamralipta and Chelitalo to Simhala.

According to the Chulavamsa, the king of Kalinga visited Ceylon during the reign of Aggabodhi II (610–611 AD). King Vijayabahu I of Ceylon (1055–1110 AD) married the daughter of the king of Kalinga. Nissanka Malla, son of king Gaparaja of Kalinga became ruler of Ceylon (1187–1196 AD). A prince of Kalinga named Magha invaded Ceylon with a fleet carrying 24,000 soldiers and ruled the island from 1214 to 1235 AD.

== Later history ==
Between the 11th and 16th centuries CE, the name Kalinga was gradually replaced by Odra Desa, Uddisa, and eventually Odisha. During the rule of Kapilendradeva (1435–1466 AD), the Odia kingdom established political supremacy over a vast territory beyond the geographical limits of Odisha, ruling from the Ganges to Arcot in the south. His successors retained their hold over an extensive territory. During the rule of Prataprudradeva, from 1497 AD to 1541 AD, the kingdom extended from the Hooghly and Midnapore districts of West Bengal to the Guntur district of Andhra Pradesh.

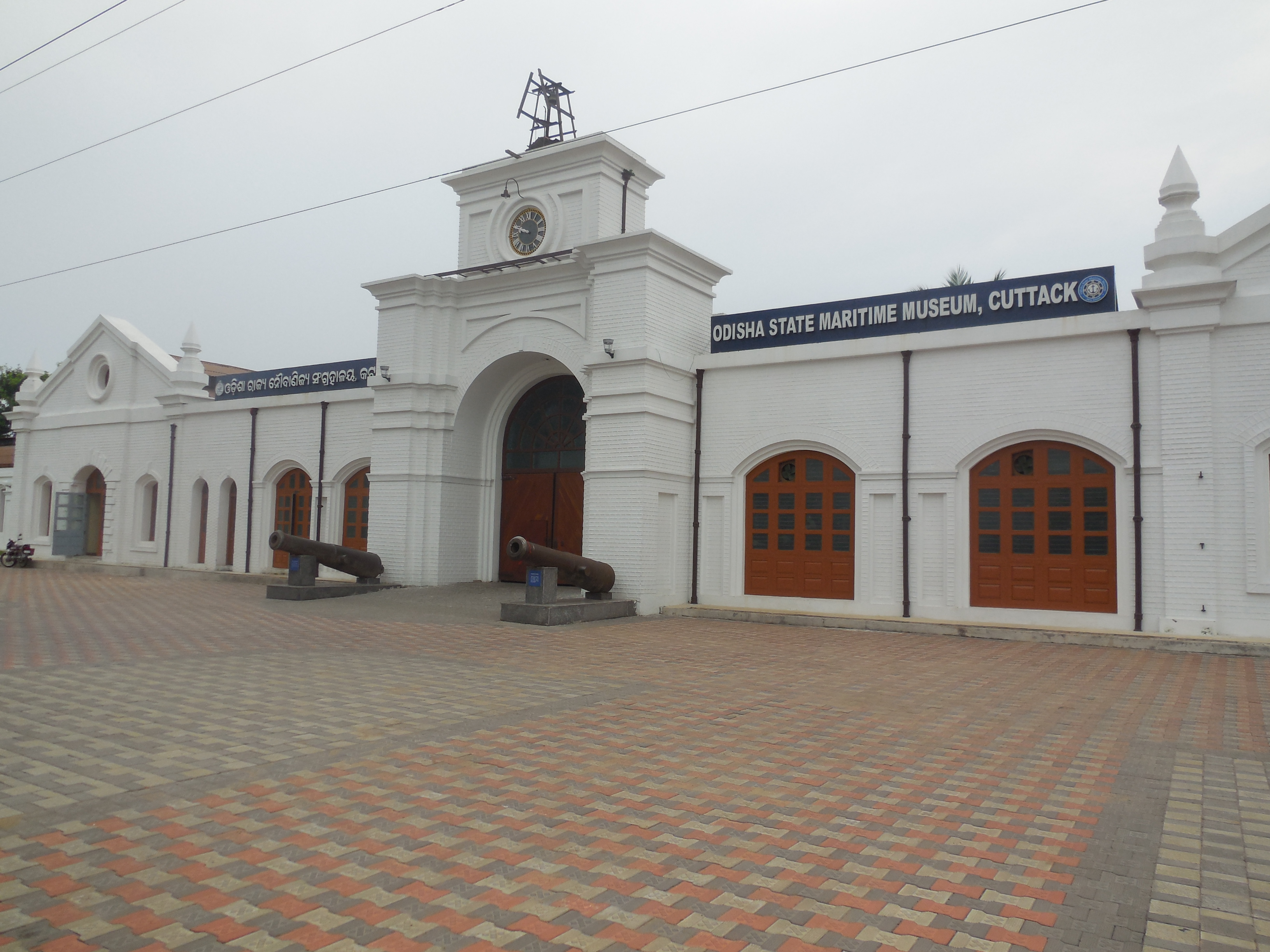
Odisha State Maritime Museum, Cuttack

Arabian sailors began to intrude into the Bay of Bengal as early as the 8th century, and later Portuguese, Dutch, English, and French ships became dominant, reducing the sailors of Odisha to the coastal trade. In 1568, the Muslim ruler of Bengal, Sulaiman Khan Karrani and then the Mughal Empire succeeded in conquering the land, ending its independence. Odisha was subsequently ceded to the Marathas in 1751, and came under British rule during the Second Anglo-Maratha War (1803–1805).

Maritime trade declined after the reign of the Gajapati Empire and with the rising dominance of European naval powers in Asia. However, minor contacts continued under the reign of Bhoi dynasty at Khurda such as noted from the Manchu language memorials and edicts depicting contacts under the reign of Qing dynasty in China, when the Qianlong Emperor received a gift from the Brahmin (Ch. Polomen 婆羅門, Ma. Bolomen) envoy of a ruler whose Manchu name was Birakišora han of Utg'ali (Ch. Wutegali bilaqishila han 烏特噶里畢拉奇碩拉汗), who is described as a ruler in Eastern India. Hence, referring to Birakisore Deva I of Khurda (1736–1793), who styled himself as Gajapati, the ruler of Utkala. Many of the gosains entering Tibet from China passed through his territory when visiting the Jagannath temple at Puri. With the defeat of the Marathas in the Second Anglo-Maratha War in 1803 and the resulting annexation of Odisha into the British Empire, ended whatever remained of the maritime trade links.

== See also ==
- Maritime history of Bengal
- Indian maritime history
- Sadhabas, ancient mariners from the Kalinga empire in eastern India
