= Indian Maritime Centre =

The Indian Maritime Centre is an autonomous body formed by the Government of India to adopt an integrated maritime policy approach among various sub-sectors and represent India's maritime sector at international forums like the International Maritime Organization. The Indian Maritime Centre board consists of a chairman and other representatives. The centre is managed by a task force constituted by the Ministry of Ports, Shipping and Waterways (MoPSW).

== See also ==
- Indian maritime history
