= Empress of India (disambiguation) =

The Empress of India is a former royal title.

It may also refer to:

- HMS Empress of India (1891), the British pre-dreadnought battleship
- HMS Emperor of India, the British dreadnought battleship
- RMS Empress of India, the Canadian passenger ships
- Empress of India Medal, a medal
- Empress of India, Queen Victoria (r. 1876–1901)
- A work by Frank Stella owned by the Museum of Modern Art
