= Indian maritime history =

Aspect of Indian history

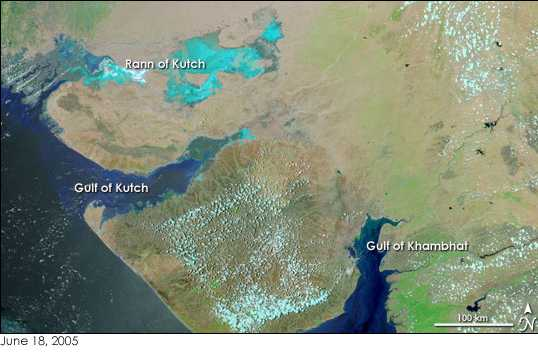
To the northwest of Lothal (2400 BCE) lies the Kutch peninsula. Proximity to the Gulf of Khambhat allowed direct access to sea routes. Lothal's topography and geology reflects its maritime past.

Indian maritime history begins during the 3rd millennium BCE, when the Indus Valley Civilisation initiated maritime trading contact with Mesopotamia. India's long coastline, with the Deccan Peninsula projecting into the Indian Ocean, helped foster extensive maritime trade and cultural exchange. The Indian Ocean is named after India due to its prominent geographic position in the region.

As per Vedic records, Indian traders and merchants traded with the Far East and Arabia. During the Maurya Empire (c. 320–185 BCE), there was a definite "naval department" to supervise the ships and trade.At the end of 1st century BCE, Indian products reached the Romans during the rule of Augustus, and the Roman historian Strabo mentions an increase in Roman trade with India following the Roman annexation of Egypt. As trade between India and the Greco-Roman world increased, spices became the main import from India to the Western world, bypassing silk and other commodities. Indians were present in Alexandria, while Christian and Jewish settlers from Rome continued to live in India long after the fall of the Roman Empire, which resulted in Rome's loss of the Red Sea ports, previously used to secure trade with India by the Greco-Roman world since the Ptolemaic dynasty. The Indian commercial connection with Southeast Asia proved vital to the merchants of Arabia and Persia during the 7th–8th century. A study published in 2013 found that some 11 percent of Australian Aboriginal DNA is of Indian origin and suggests these immigrants arrived about 4,000 years ago, possibly at the same time dingoes first arrived in Australia.

On orders of Manuel I of Portugal, four vessels under the command of navigator Vasco da Gama rounded the Cape of Good Hope, continuing to the eastern coast of Africa to Malindi to sail across the Indian Ocean to Calicut by 1498. This discovery of the Cape Route meant that the wealth of the Indies was now open for the Europeans to explore. The Portuguese Empire was the first European empire to grow from spice trade. By 1869, the completion of the Suez Canal resulted in a faster maritime route between Europe and India, allowing the United Kingdom to more easily maintain control in India and the Indian Ocean.

== National Maritime Day ==
5 April is celebrated as National Maritime Day in India. On this day in 1919 the SS Loyalty, the first ship of the Scindia Steam Navigation Company Ltd., journeyed to the United Kingdom, a crucial step for India's shipping history when sea routes were controlled by the British.

== Prehistory ==
The region around the Indus River began to show visible increase in both the length and the frequency of maritime voyages by 3000 BCE. Optimum conditions for viable long-distance voyages existed in this region by 2900 BCE. Mesopotamian inscriptions indicate that Indian traders from the Indus Valley—carrying copper, hardwoods, ivory, pearls, carnelian, and gold—were active in Mesopotamia during the reign of Sargon of Akkad (c. 2300 BCE). Gosch & Stearns write on the Indus Valley's pre-modern maritime travel: Evidence exists that Harappans were bulk-shipping timber and special woods to Sumer on ships and luxury items such as lapis lazuli. The trade in lapis lazuli was carried out from northern Afghanistan over eastern Iran to Sumer but during the Mature Harappan period an Indus colony was established at Shortugai in Central Asia near the Badakshan mines and the lapis stones were brought overland to Lothal in Gujarat and shipped to Oman, Bahrain and Mesopotamia.

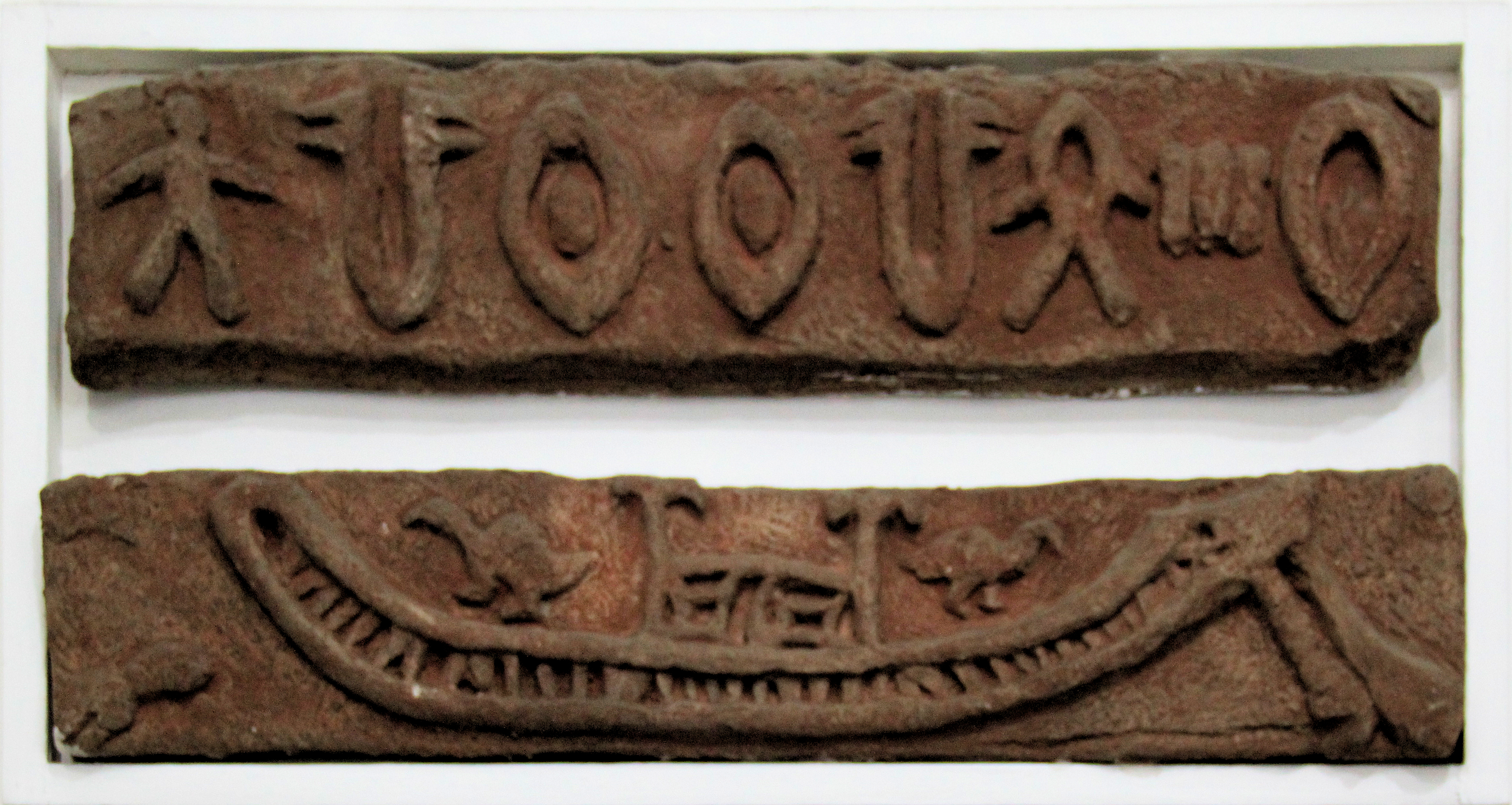
Indus valley seal, Boat with direction-finding birds to find land.

Archaeological research at sites in Mesopotamia, Bahrain, and Oman has led to the recovery of artefacts traceable to the Indus Valley civilisation, confirming the information on the inscriptions. Among the most important of these objects are stamp seals carved in soapstone, stone weights, and colourful carnelian beads....Most of the trade between Mesopotamia and the Indus Valley was indirect. Shippers from both regions converged in Persian Gulf ports, especially on the island of Bahrain (known as Dilmun to the Sumerians). Numerous small Indus-style artefacts have been recovered at locations on Bahrain and further down the coast of the Arabian Peninsula in Oman. Stamp seals produced in Bahrain have been found at sites in Mesopotamia and the Indus Valley, strengthening the likelihood that the island may have acted as a redistribution point for goods coming from Mesopotamia and the Indus area....There are hints from the digs at Ur, a major Sumerian city-state on the Euphrates, that some Indus Valley merchants and artisans (bead makers) may have established communities in Mesopotamia.

The world's first dock at Lothal (2400 BCE) was located away from the main current to avoid deposition of silt. Modern oceanographers have observed that the Harappans must have possessed great knowledge relating to tides in order to build such a dock on the ever-shifting course of the Sabarmati, as well as exemplary hydrography and maritime engineering. This was the earliest known dock found in the world, equipped to berth and service ships. It is speculated that Lothal engineers studied tidal movements, and their effects on brick-built structures, since the walls are of kiln-burnt bricks. This knowledge also enabled them to select Lothal's location in the first place, as the Gulf of Khambhat has the highest tidal amplitude and ships can be sluiced through flow tides in the river estuary. The engineers built a trapezoidal structure, with north–south arms of average 21.8 metres (71.5 ft), and east–west arms of 37 metres (121 ft).

Excavations at Golbai Sasan in Odisha have shown a Neolithic culture dating to as early as ca. 2300 BC, followed by a Chalcolithic (copper age) culture and then an Iron Age culture starting around 900 BC. Tools found at this site indicate boat building, perhaps for coastal trade. Fish bones, fishing hooks, barbed spears and harpoons show that fishing was an important part of the economy. Some artefacts of the Chalcolithic period are similar to artefacts found in Vietnam, indicating possible contact with Indochina at a very early period.

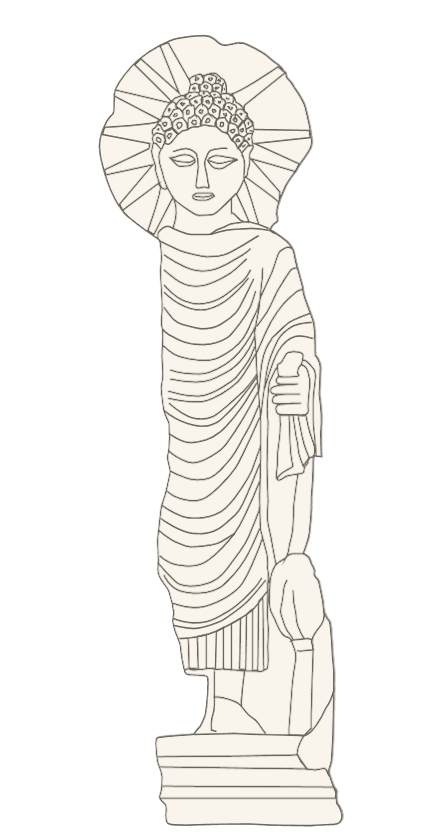
The Berenike Buddha, discovered in Berenice Troglodytica in 2022.

Indians had already been trading with Egypt for a long time even before the conquest of Egypt by the Romans. At the end of 1st century BCE Indian products reached the Romans during the rule of Augustus, and the Roman historian Strabo mentions an increase in Roman trade with India following the Roman annexation of Egypt. Recent excavations at Berenike in Egypt have confirmed, there was a small community of Indian Buddhists at Alexandria, the greatest of all Roman ports. A large number of significant finds have been made providing evidence of the cargo from the Malabar Coast and the presence of Tamil people from South India and Jaffna being at this last outpost of the Roman Empire.

== Early kingdoms ==
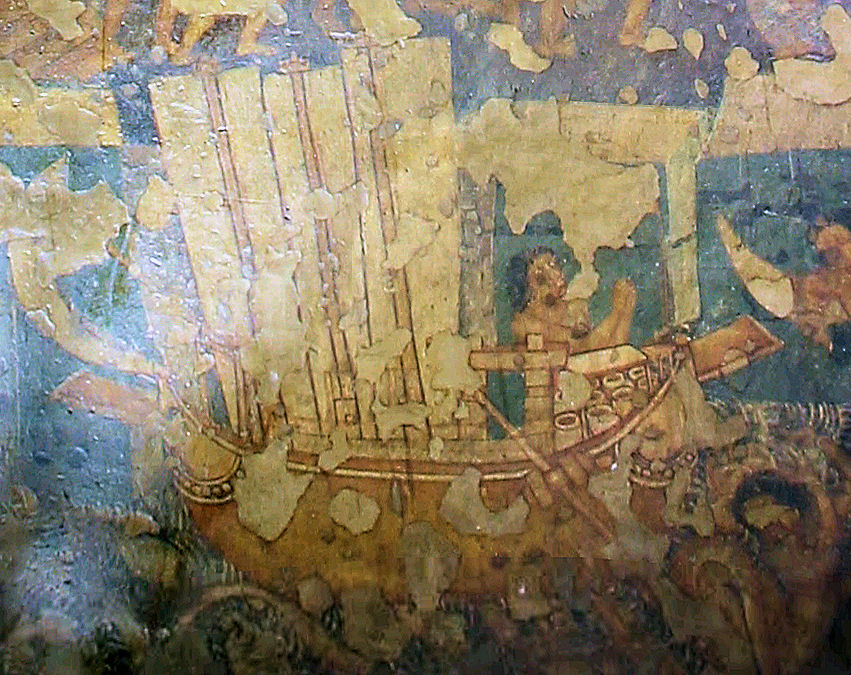
Three-mast sailship, c. 5th century

Indian cartography locates the Pole star, and other constellations of use in navigational charts. These charts may have been in use by the beginning of the Common Era for purposes of navigation. Detailed maps of considerable length describing the locations of settlements, sea shores, rivers, and mountains were also made. The Periplus Maris Erythraei mentions a time when sea trade between India and Egypt did not involve direct sailings. The cargo under these situations was shipped to Aden:

Roman trade with India according to the Periplus Maris Erythraei (1st century CE).

Eudaimon Arabia was called fortunate, being once a city, when, because ships neither came from India to Egypt nor did those from Egypt dare to go further but only came as far as this place, it received the cargoes from both, just as Alexandria receives goods brought from outside and from Egypt.

Tamil Pandya embassies were received by Augustus Caesar and Roman historians mention a total of four embassies from the Tamil country. Pliny famously mentions the expenditure of one million sestertii every year on goods such as pepper, fine cloth and gems from the southern coasts of India. Tamil inscriptions have been found in Luxor in Egypt. In turn, Tamil literature from the Classical period mentions foreign ships arriving for trade and paying in gold for products.

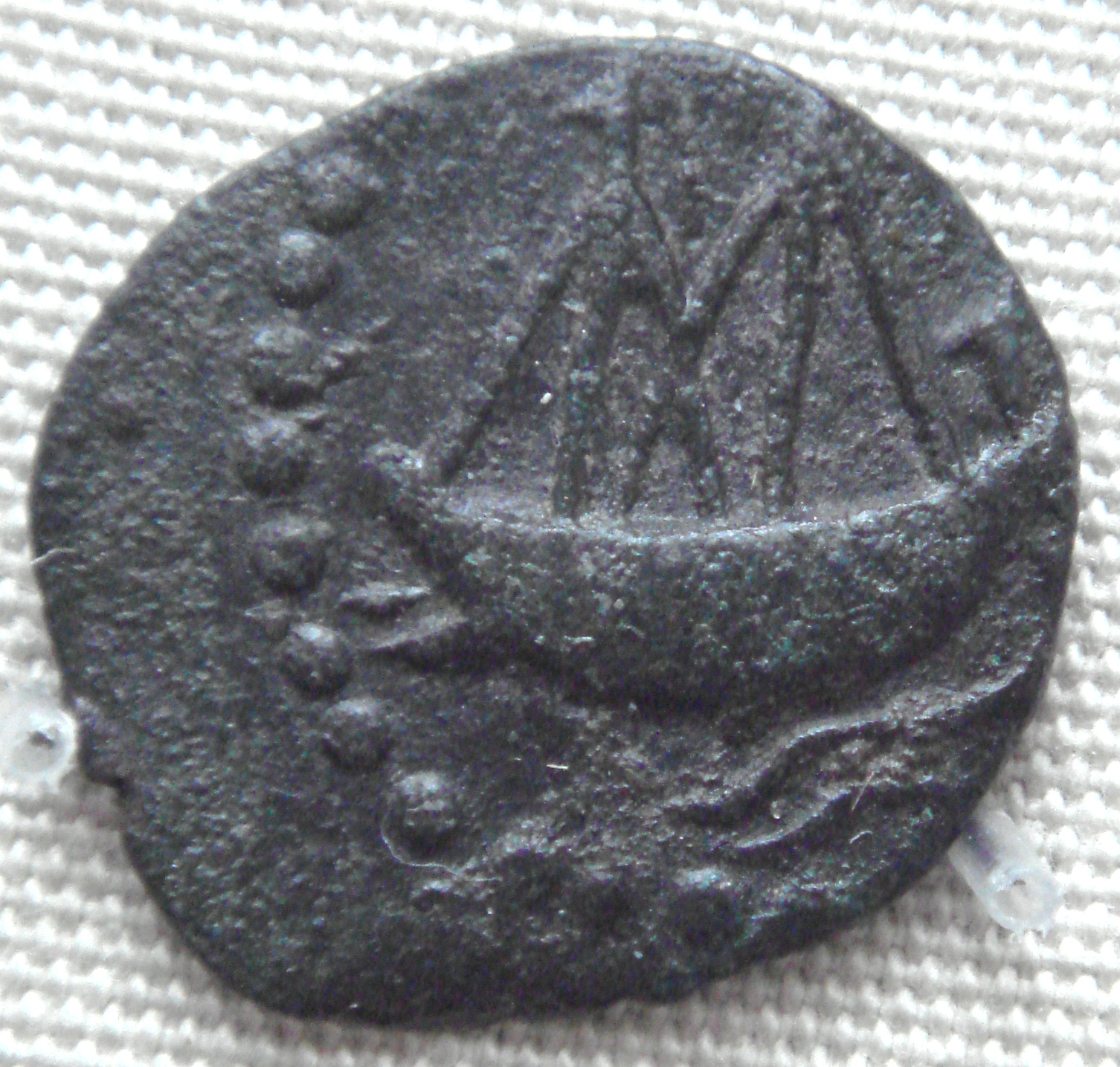
Indian ship on lead coin of Vasisthiputra Sri Pulamavi, testimony to the naval, seafaring and trading capabilities of the Satavahanas during the 1st–2nd century CE.

The first clear mention of a navy occurs in the mythological epic Mahabharata. Historically, however, the first attested attempt to organise a navy in India, as described by Megasthenes (c. 350—290 BCE), is attributed to Chandragupta Maurya (reign 322—298 BCE). The Maurya Empire (322–185 BCE) navy continued till the times of emperor Ashoka (reign 273—232 BCE), who used it to send massive diplomatic missions to Greece, Syria, Egypt, Cyrene, Macedonia and Epirus. Following nomadic interference in Siberia—one of the sources for India's bullion—India diverted its attention to the Malay Peninsula, which became its new source for gold and was soon exposed to the world via a series of maritime trade routes. The period under the Mauryan Empire also witnessed various other regions of the world engage increasingly in the Indian Ocean maritime voyages.

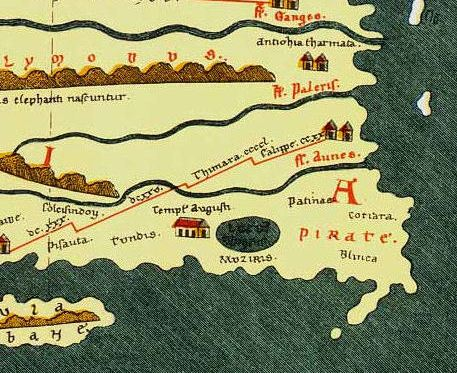
Muziris, as shown in the Tabula Peutingeriana.

According to the historian Strabo (II.5.12.) the Roman trade with India trade initiated by Eudoxus of Cyzicus in 130 BCE kept increasing. Indian ships sailed to Egypt as the thriving maritime routes of Southern Asia were not under the control of a single power. In India, the ports of Barbaricum (modern Karachi), Barygaza, Muziris, Korkai, Kaveripattinam and Arikamedu on the southern tip of India were the main centres of this trade. The Periplus Maris Erythraei describes Greco—Roman merchants selling in Barbaricum "thin clothing, figured linens, topaz, coral, storax, frankincense, vessels of glass, silver and gold plate, and a little wine" in exchange for "costus, bdellium, lycium, nard, turquoise, lapis lazuli, Seric skins, cotton cloth, silk yarn, and indigo". In Barygaza, they would buy wheat, rice, sesame oil, cotton and cloth.

The Ethiopian kingdom of Aksum was involved in the Indian Ocean trade network and was influenced by Roman culture and Indian architecture. Traces of Indian influences are visible in Roman works of silver and ivory, or in Egyptian cotton and silk fabrics used for sale in Europe. The Indian presence in Alexandria may have influenced the culture but little is known about the manner of this influence. Clement of Alexandria mentions the Buddha in his writings and other Indian religions find mentions in other texts of the period. The Indians were present in Alexandria and Christian and Jewish settlers from Rome continued to live in India long after the fall of the Roman Empire, which resulted in Rome's loss of the Red Sea ports, previously used to secure trade with India by the Greco—Roman world since the time of the Ptolemaic dynasty.

== Early Common Era—High Middle Ages ==
Historic Indosphere cultural influence zone of Greater India for transmission of elements of Indian elements such as the honorific titles, naming of people, naming of places, mottos of organisations and educational institutes as well as adoption of Hinduism, Buddhism, Indian architecture, martial arts, Indian music and dance, traditional Indian clothing, and Indian cuisine, a process which has also been aided by the ongoing historic expansion of Indian diaspora.

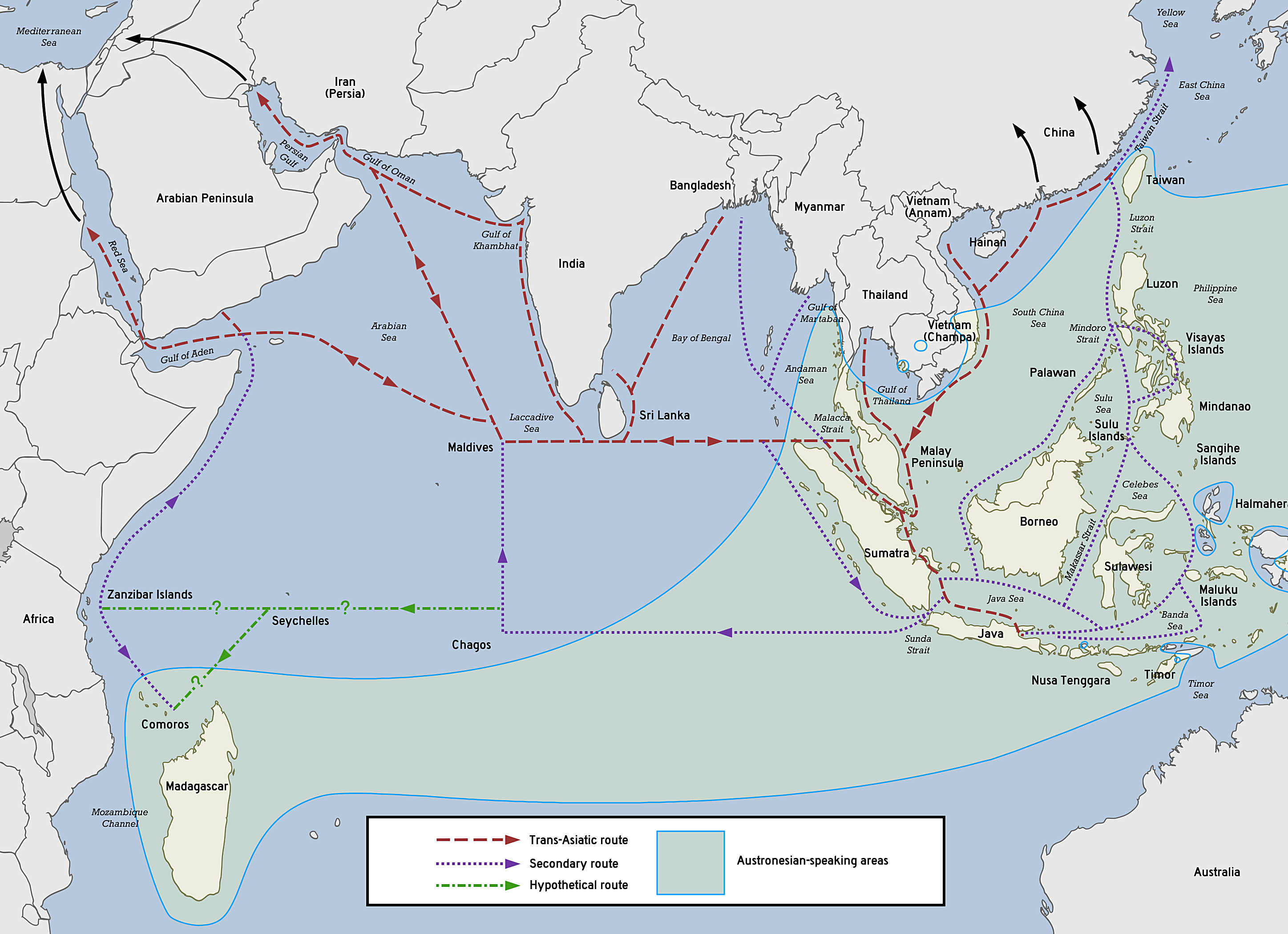
Austronesian proto-historic and historic maritime trade network in the Indian Ocean

During this period, Hindu and Buddhist religious establishments of Southeast Asia came to be associated with economic activity and commerce as patrons entrusted large funds which would later be used to benefit local economy by estate management, craftsmanship and promotion of trading activities. Buddhism, in particular, travelled alongside the maritime trade, promoting coinage, art and literacy. This route caused the intermixing of many artistic and cultural influences, Hellenistic, Iranian, Indian and Chinese, Greco-Buddhist art represents one such vivid examples of this interaction. Buddha was first depicted as human in the Kushan period with intermixing of Greek and Indian elements, and the influence of this Greco-Buddhist art can be found in later Buddhist art in China and throughout countries on the Silk Road. Ashoka and after him his successors of Kalinga, Pallava and Chola empires along with their vassals Pandya and Chera dynasties, as well as Vijayanagara Empire all played a vital role in expanding Indianisation, extending Indian maritime trade and growth of Hinduism and Buddhism. Port of Kollam is an example of important trade port in Maritime Silk Route.

The Maritime Silk Route, which flourished between the 2nd century BC and 15th century AD connected China, Southeast Asia, the Indian subcontinent, Arabian Peninsula, Somalia, Egypt and Europe. Despite its association with China in recent centuries, the Maritime Silk Route was primarily established and operated by Austronesian sailors in Southeast Asia, Tamil merchants in India and Southeast Asia, Greco-Roman merchants in East Africa, India, Ceylon and Indochina, and by Persian and Arab traders in the Arabian Sea and beyond. Prior to the 10th century, the route was primarily used by Southeast Asian traders, although Tamil and Persian traders also sailed them. For most of its history, Austronesian thalassocracies controlled the flow of the Maritime Silk Road, especially the polities around the straits of Malacca, Bangka, the Malay Peninsula, and the Mekong delta; although Chinese records misidentified these kingdoms as being "Indian" due to the Indianisation of these regions but it had influenced the kingdoms and its culture. The route was influential in the early spread of Hinduism and Buddhism to the east. The Maritime Silk Road developed from the earlier Austronesian spice trade networks of Islander Southeast Asians with Sri Lanka and Southern India (established 1000 to 600 BCE).

Kalinga (in 3rd century BCE was annexed by the Mauryan emperor Ashoka) and Vijayanagara Empire (1336-1646) also established footholds in Malaya, Sumatra and Western Java. Maritime history of Odisha, known as Kalinga in ancient times, started before 350 BC according to early sources. The people of this region of eastern India along the coast of the Bay of Bengal sailed up and down the Indian coast, and travelled to Indo China and throughout Maritime Southeast Asia, introducing elements of their culture to the people with whom they traded. The old traditions are still celebrated in the annual Bali Jatra, or Boita Bandana festival held for five days in October/November.

Textiles from India were in demand in Egypt, East Africa, and the Mediterranean between the 1st and 2nd centuries CE, and these regions became overseas markets for Indian exports. In Java and Borneo, the introduction of Indian culture created a demand for aromatics, and trading posts here later served Chinese and Arab markets. The Periplus Maris Erythraei names several Indian ports from where large ships sailed in an easterly direction to Chryse. Products from the Maluku Islands that were shipped across the ports of Arabia to the Near East passed through the ports of India and Sri Lanka. After reaching either the Indian or the Sri Lankan ports, products were sometimes shipped to East Africa, where they were used for a variety of purposes including burial rites.

Indian spice exports find mention in the works of Ibn Khurdadhbeh (850), al-Ghafiqi (1150 CE), Ishak bin Imaran (907) and Al Kalkashandi (14th century). Chinese traveler Xuanzang mentions the town of Puri where "merchants depart for distant countries." The Abbasid Caliphate (750–1258 CE) used Alexandria, Damietta, Aden and Siraf as entry ports to India and China. Merchants arriving from India in the port city of Aden paid tribute in form of musk, camphor, ambergris and sandalwood to Ibn Ziyad, the sultan of Yemen.

Chola territories during Rajendra Chola I, c. 1030 CE.

The Chola dynasty (300BC—1279) reached the peak of its influence and power during the medieval period. Emperors Rajaraja Chola I (reigned 985–1014) and Rajendra Chola I (reigned 1012–1044) extended the Chola kingdom beyond the traditional limits. At its peak, the Chola Empire stretched from the island of Sri Lanka in the south to the Godavari basin in the north. The kingdoms along the east coast of India up to the river Ganges acknowledged Chola suzerainty. Chola navies invaded and conquered Srivijaya and Srivijaya was the largest empire in Maritime Southeast Asia. Goods and ideas from India began to play a major role in the Indianisation of the wider world from this period. The Cholas excelled in foreign trade and maritime activity, extending their influence overseas to China and Southeast Asia. Towards the end of the 9th century, southern India had developed extensive maritime and commercial activity. The Cholas, being in possession of parts of both the west and the east coasts of peninsular India, were at the forefront of these ventures. The Tang dynasty (618–907) of China, the Srivijaya Empire in Maritime Southeast Asia under the Sailendras, and the Abbasid Caliphate at Baghdad were the main trading partners.

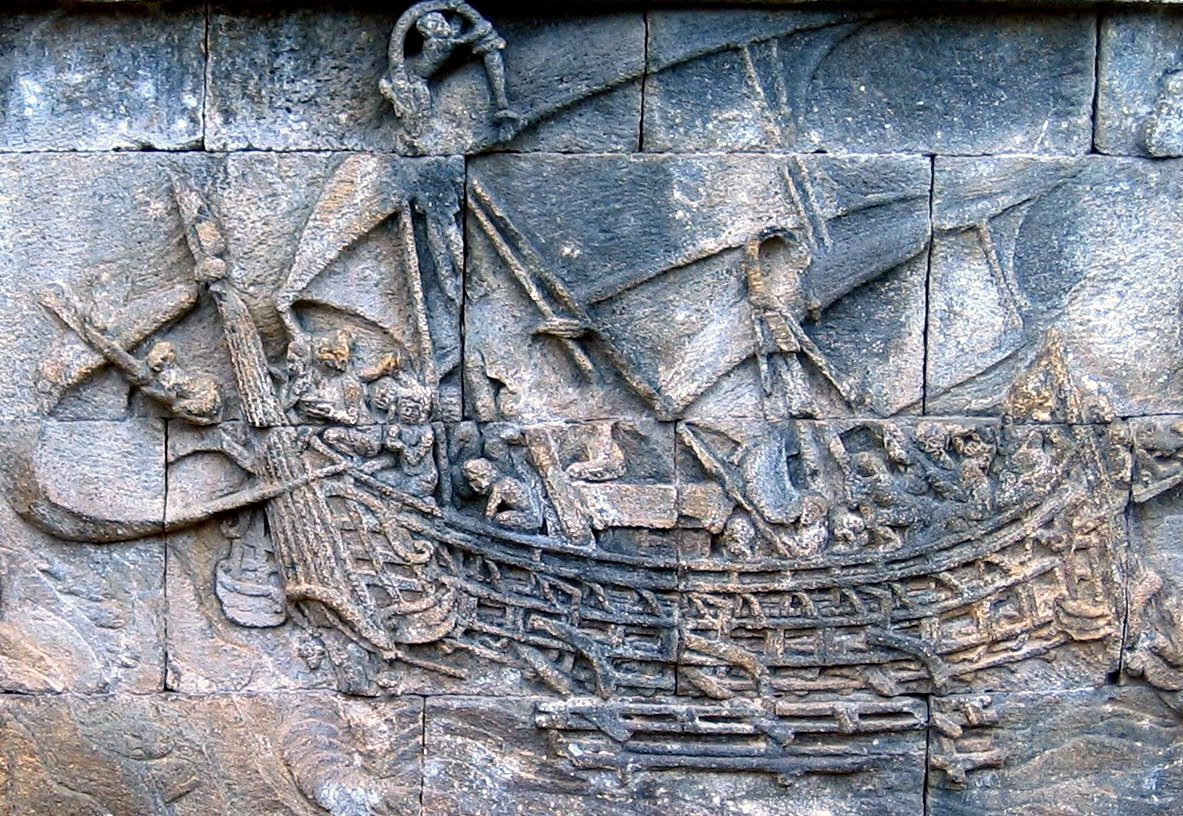
One of the Borobudur ships from the 8th century, they were depictions of large Javanese outrigger trading vessels. Shown with the characteristic tanja sail of Southeast Asian Austronesians.

Srivijaya Empire, an Indianised Hindu-Buddhist empire founded at Palembang in 682 CE as indicated in Tang records, rose to dominate the trade in the region around the straits and the South China Sea emporium by controlling the trade in luxury aromatics and Buddhist artifacts from West Asia to a thriving Tang market. Chinese records also indicate that the early Chinese Buddhist pilgrims to South Asia booked passage with the Austronesian ships that traded in Chinese ports. Books written by Chinese monks like Wan Chen and Hui-Lin contain detailed accounts of the large trading vessels from Southeast Asia dating back to at least the 3rd century CE.

One of the Pandya Empire (3rd century BCE to 14th century CE) ruler Parantaka Nedumjadaiyan (765–790) and the Chera dynasty (absorbed into the Pandya political system by 10th/11th century AD) were a close ally of the Pallavas (275 CE to 897 CE). Pallavamalla Nadivarman defeated the Pandya Varaguna with the help of a Chera king. Cultural contacts between the Pallava court and the Chera country were common. Eventually, Cheras dynasty were subsumed by Pandya dynasty, which in turn was subsumed by the Pallava dynasty.

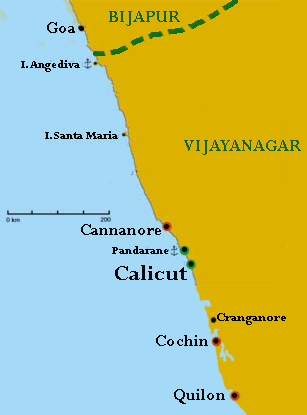
Port of Kollam (est. 825 CE) & Calicut, map C.1500.

Kollam (also called Quilon or Desinganadu's) in coastal Kerala become operational in AD.825, and has a high commercial reputation since the days of the Phoenicians and Romans, The ruler of Kollam (who were vassals of Pandya dynasty who in turn later became vassals of Chola dynasty) also used to exchange the embassies with Chinese rulers and there was flourishing Chinese settlement at Kollam. The Indian commercial connection with Southeast Asia proved vital to the merchants of Arabia and Persia between the 7th and 8th centuries CE, and merchant Sulaiman of Siraf in Persia (9th Century) found Kollam to be the only port in India, touched by the huge Chinese junks, on his way from Carton of Persian Gulf. Marco Polo, the great Venetian traveller, who was in Chinese service under Kublai Khan in 1275, visited Kollam and other towns on the west coast, in his capacity as a Chinese mandarin. Fed by the Chinese trade, port of Kollam was also mentioned by Ibn Battuta in the 14th century as one of the five Indian ports he had seen in the course of his travels during twenty-four years.

Growth and development of agriculture in Kerala hinterlands brought about plentiful availability of surplus. The excess agricultural crops and grains were bartered for other necessities in angadis or trading centres, turning the ports to cities. Traders used coins especially in foreign trade to export spices, muslin, cotton, pearls and precious stones to countries of the west and received the wine, olive oil, amphora and terracotta pots from there. Egyptian dinars and Venetian ducats (1284-1797) were in great demand in medieval Kerala's international trade.

The Arabs and the Chinese were important trade partners of medieval Kerala. Arab trade and navigation attained a new enthusiasm since the birth and spread of Islam. Four gold coins of Umayyad Caliphate (661-750 CE) found in Kothamangalam testifies the visit of Arab traders to Kerala in that period. With the formation of Abbasid Caliphate (750-1258 CE) the Golden Age of Islam began and trade flourished as the religion was favorably disposed towards trade. Ninth century onwards the Arab trade to Malabar was raised to new esteems and saw many outposts of Muslim merchants. Malabar maritime traders, reviled as lowest-caste Hindus due to longstanding maritime taboos, rapidly converted to Islam. This, later on, became a strong element of Kerala Maritime History.

The Trade with Malabar resulted in the drainage of Chinese gold in abundance that the Song dynasty (1127-1279) prohibited the use of gold, silver and bronze in foreign trade in 1219 and silk fabrics and porcelain was ordered to be bartered against foreign goods. Pepper, coconut, fish, betel nuts, etc. were exported from Malabar in exchange for gold, silver, colored satin, blue and white porcelain, musk, quicksilver and camphor from China.

== Late Middle Ages ==
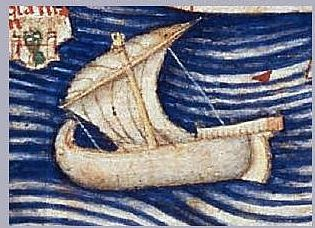
Indian vessel as shown in the Fra Mauro map (1460).

Ma Huan (1413–51) reached Cochin and noted that Indian coins, known as fanam, were issued in Cochin and weighed a total of one fen and one li according to the Chinese standards. They were of fine quality and could be exchanged in China for 15 silver coins of four-li weight each.

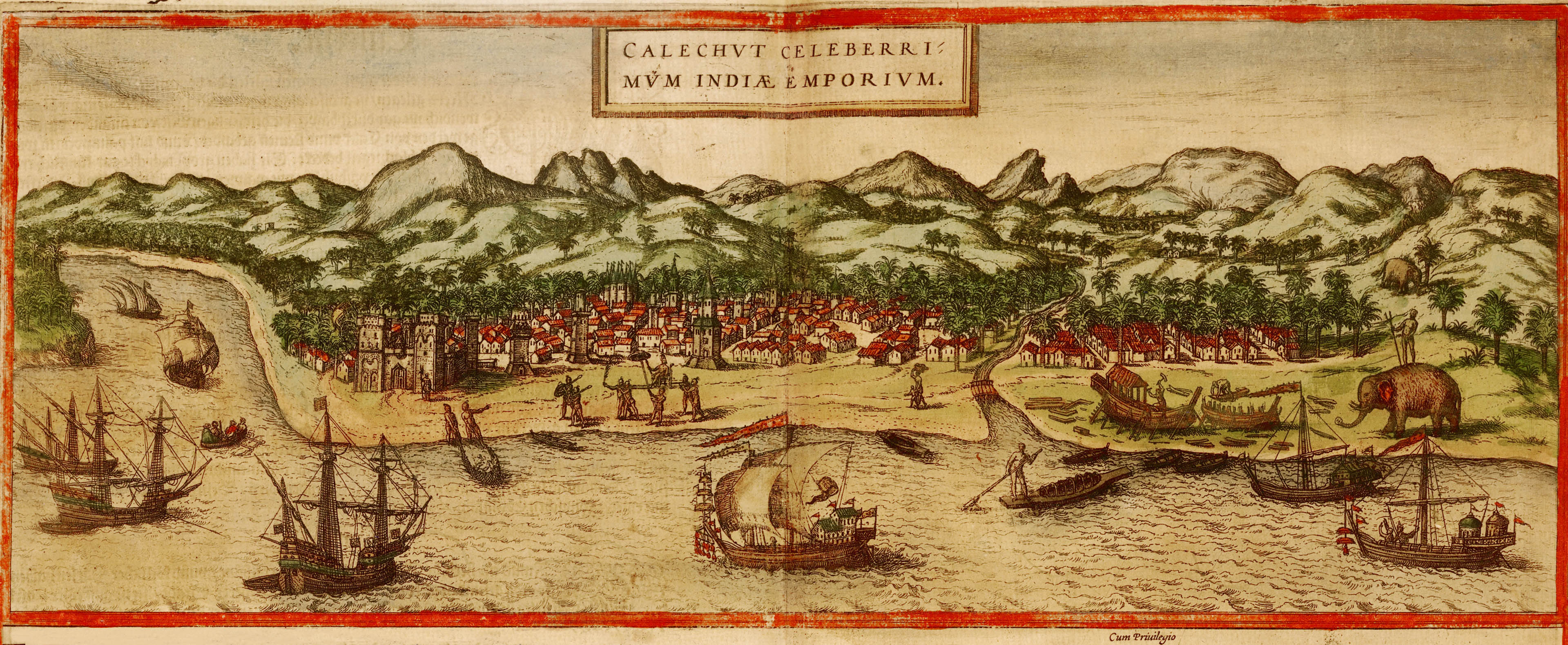
Image of Calicut, India from Georg Braun and Frans Hogenberg's atlas Civitates orbis terrarum, 1572.

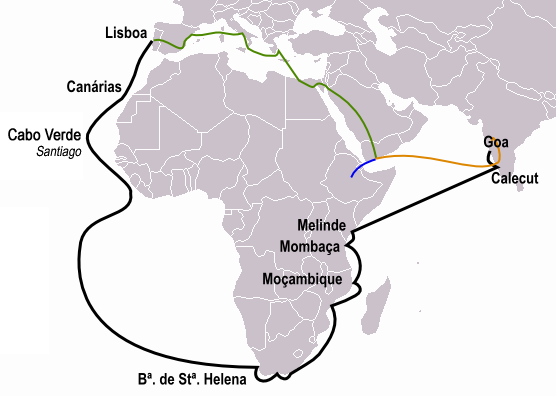
This figure illustrates the path of Vasco da Gama's course to India (black), the first to go around Africa. Voyages of Pêro da Covilhã (orange) and Afonso de Paiva (blue) are also shown with common routes marked in green.

On the orders of Manuel I of Portugal, four vessels under the command of navigator Vasco da Gama rounded the Cape of Good Hope in 1497, continuing to Malindi on the eastern coast of Africa, from there to sail across the Indian Ocean to Calicut. Christian missionaries traveling with trade, such as Saint Francis Xavier, were instrumental in the spread of Christianity in the East.

The first Dutch expedition left from Amsterdam (April 1595) for South East Asia. Another Dutch convoy sailed in 1598 and returned one year later with 600,000 pounds of spices and other Indian products. The United East India Company forged alliances with the principal producers of cloves and nutmeg.

== Early Modern Era ==
Shivaji Bhonsle (reign 1664–1680) maintained a navy under the charge of general Kanhoji Angre (served 1698–1729). The initial advances of the Portuguese were checked by this navy, which also effectively relieved the traffic and commerce in India's west coast of Portuguese threat. The Maratha navy also checked the English East India Company, until the navy itself underwent a decline due to the policies of general Nanasaheb (reign 1740 – 1761).

Baba Makhan Shah Labana, a noted Sikh of the 17th century is known for trade in sea route to Gulf and Mediterranean region.

During the Mughal Empire, the province of Bengal Subah had a large shipbuilding industry. Economic historian Indrajit Ray estimates shipbuilding output of Bengal during the sixteenth and seventeenth centuries at 223,250 tons annually, compared with 23,061 tons produced in nineteen colonies in North America from 1769 to 1771. He also assesses ship repairing as very advanced in Bengal.

Bengali shipbuilding was advanced compared to European shipbuilding at the time. An important innovation in shipbuilding was the introduction of a flushed deck design in Bengal rice ships, resulting in hulls that were stronger and less prone to leak than the structurally weak hulls of traditional European ships built with a stepped deck design. The British East India Company later duplicated the flushed deck and hull designs of Bengal rice ships in the 1760s, leading to significant improvements in seaworthiness and navigation for European ships during the Industrial Revolution.

== British Raj – Modern Period ==
The British East India Company shipped substantial quantities of spices during the early 17th century. Rajesh Kadian (2006) examines the history of the British navy in as the British Raj was established in India:

In 1830 ships of the British East India Company were designated as the Indian navy. However, in 1863, it was disbanded when Britain's Royal Navy took control of the Indian Ocean. About thirty years later, the few small Indian naval units were called the Royal Indian Marine (RIM). In the wake of World War I, Britain, exhausted in manpower and resources, opted for expansion of the RIM. Consequently, on 2 October 1934, the RIM was reincarnated as the Royal Indian Navy (RIN).

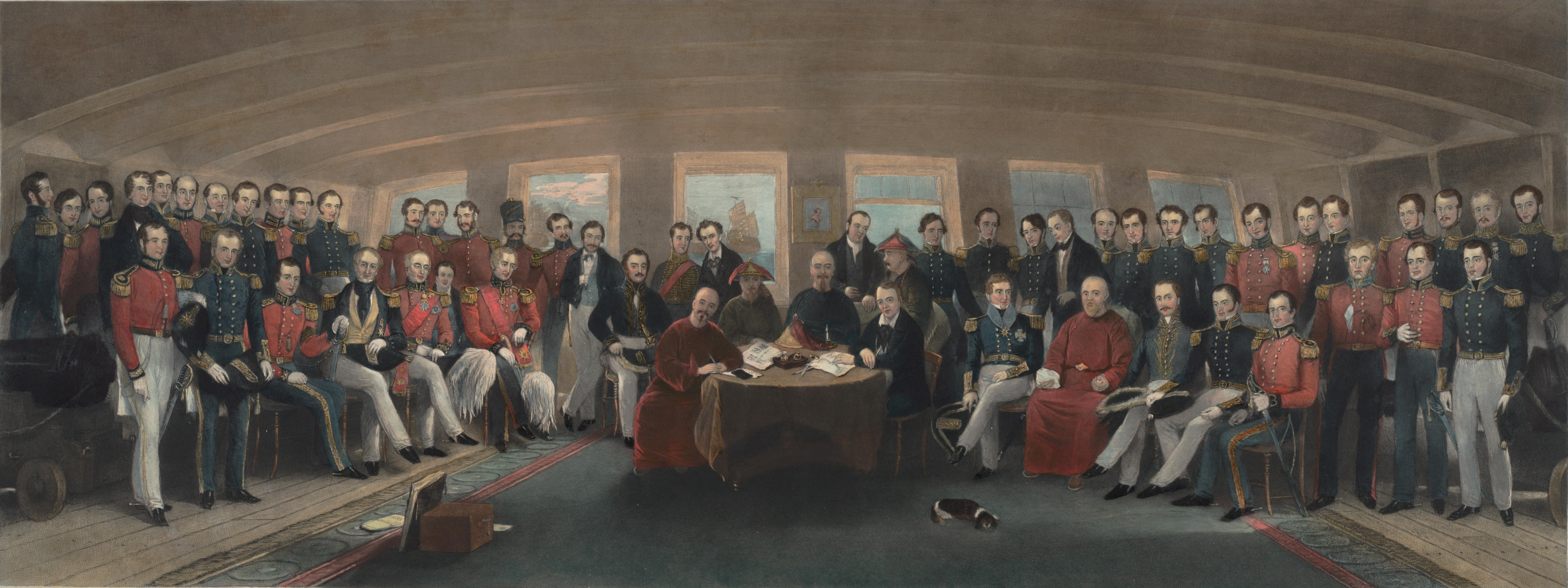
The Treaty of Nanking was signed in 1842 on board HMS Cornwallis, made by shipbuilders at the Bombay Dockyard.

The Indian rulers weakened with the advent of the European powers. Shipbuilders, however, continued to build ships capable of carrying 800 to 1,000 tons. The shipbuilders at the Bombay Dockyard built ships like HMS Hindostan and HMS Ceylon, inducted into the Royal Navy. The historical ships made by Indian shipbuilders included HMS Asia (commanded by Edward Codrington during the Battle of Navarino in 1827), the frigate HMS Cornwallis (onboard which the Treaty of Nanking was signed in 1842), and HMS Minden (on which "The Star-Spangled Banner" was composed by Francis Scott Key). David Arnold examines the role of Indian shipbuilders during the British Raj:

Shipbuilding was a well-established craft at numerous points along the Indian coastline long before the arrival of the Europeans and was a significant factor in the high level of Indian maritime activity in the Indian Ocean region....As with cotton textiles, European trade was initially a stimulus to Indian shipbuilding: vessels built in ports like Masulipatam and Surat from Indian hardwoods by local craftsmen were cheaper and tougher than their European counterparts.

Between the seventeenth and early nineteenth centuries Indian shipyards produced a series of vessels incorporating these hybrid features. A large proportion of them were built in Bombay, where the Company had established a small shipyard. In 1736 Parsi carpenters were brought in from Surat to work there and, when their European supervisor died, one of the carpenters, Lowji Nuserwanji Wadia, was appointed Master Builder in his place.

Wadia oversaw the construction of thirty-five ships, twenty-one of them for the Company. Following his death in 1774, his sons took charge of the shipyard and between them built a further thirty ships over the next sixteen years. The Britannia, a ship of 749 tons launched in 1778, so impressed the Court of Directors when it reached Britain that several new ships were commissioned from Bombay, some of which later passed into the hands of the Royal Navy. In all, between 1736 and 1821, 159 ships of over 100 tons were built at Bombay, including 15 of over 1,000 tons. Ships constructed at Bombay in its heyday were said to be 'vastly superior to anything built anywhere else in the world'.

The 1869 completion of the Suez Canal created a more direct route between Britain and India, furthering the importance of coastal cities like Mumbai.

== Contemporary Era (1947–present) ==
=== Military ===
In 1947, the Republic of India's navy consisted of 33 ships, and 538 officers to secure a coastline of more than 4,660 miles (7,500 km) and 1,280 islands. The Indian navy conducted annual Joint Exercises with other Commonwealth navies throughout the 1950s. The navy saw action during various of the country's wars, including Indian integration of Junagadh, the liberation of Goa, the 1965 war, and the 1971 war. Following difficulty in obtaining spare parts from the Soviet Union, India also embarked upon a massive indigenous naval designing and production programme aimed at manufacturing destroyers, frigates, corvettes, and submarines.

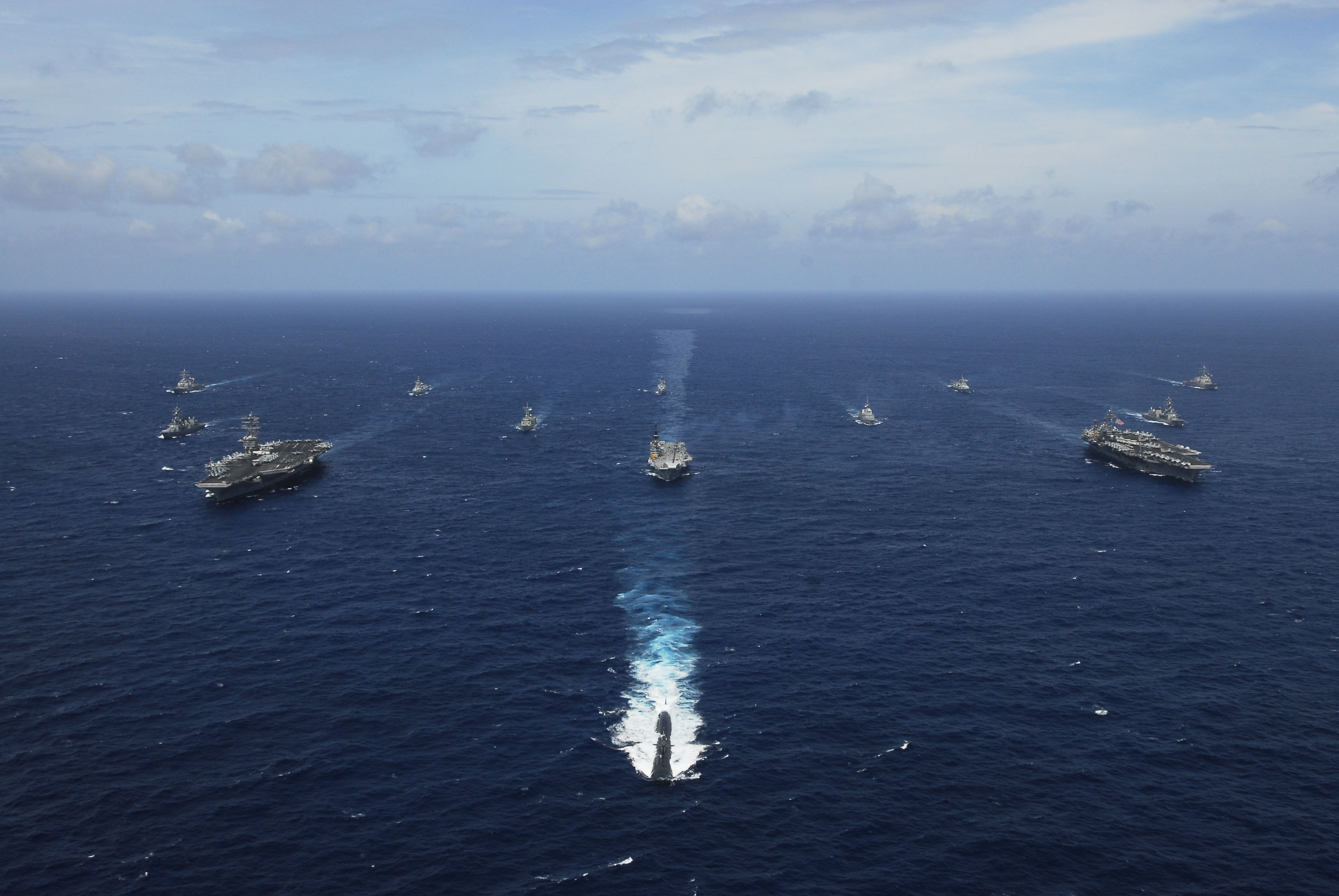
Ships participating in the Malabar 2007 naval exercise from the navies of India, United States, Japan, Australia and Singapore in the Bay of Bengal.

India's Coast Guard Act was passed in August 1978. The Indian Coast Guard participated in counter terrorism operations such as Operation Cactus. During contemporary times the Indian navy was commissioned in several United Nations peacekeeping missions. The navy also repatriated Indian nationals from Kuwait during the first Gulf War. Rajesh Kadian (2006) holds that: "During the Kargil War (1999), the aggressive posture adopted by the navy played a role in convincing Islamabad and Washington that a larger conflict loomed unless Pakistan withdrew from the heights.".

As a result of the growing strategic ties with the western world the Indian navy has conducted joint exercises with its western counterparts, including the United States Navy, and has obtained the latest naval equipment from its western allies. Better relations with the United States of America and Israel have led to joint patrolling of the Straits of Malacca.

=== Civil ===
Since the start of the new millennium international trade by and through India has grown manifold . The following table gives the detailed data about the major ports of India for the financial year 2005–06 and percentage growth over 2004–05 (Source: Indian Ports Association):

Name	Cargo Handled (06-07) '000 tonnes	% Increase (over 05–06)	Vessel Traffic (05-06)	% Increase (over 04–05)	Container Traffic (05-06) '000 TEUs	% Increase (over 04–05)
Kolkata (Kolkata Dock System & Haldia Dock Complex)	55,050	3.59%	2,853	07.50%	313	09.06%
Paradip	38,517	16.33%	1,330	10.01%	3	50.00%
Visakhapatnam	56,386	1.05%	2,109	14.43%	47	04.44%
Chennai	53,798	13.05%	1,857	11.26%	735	19.12%
Tuticorin	18,001	05.03%	1,576	06.56%	321	04.56%
Cochin	15,314	10.28%	1,225	09.38%	203	09.73%
New Mangalore Port	32,042	-06.99%	1,087	01.87%	10	11.11%
Mormugao	34,241	08.06%	642	-03.31%	9	-10.00%
Mumbai	52,364	18.50%	2,153	14.34%	159	-27.40%
J.N.P.T, Navi Mumbai	44,818	18.45%	2,395	03.06%	2,267	-04.39%
Ennore	10,714	16.86%	173	01.17%		
Kandla	52,982	15.41%	2,124	09.48%	148	-18.23%
All Indian Ports	463,843	9.51%	19,796	08.64%	4,744	12.07%

== See also ==
- Spread of Indian influence through maritime routes
  - Greater India
  - Indosphere
  - Indian diaspora
  - Buddhism in Southeast Asia
  - Hinduism in Southeast Asia
  - History of Indian influence on Southeast Asia
  - Indianization of Southeast Asia
  - Tamil loanwords in Hebrew
- Trading routes
  - Indian Ocean trade
  - Indo-Mediterranean
    - India–Middle East–Europe Economic Corridor
    - Indo-Roman trade relations
  - Indo-Pacific
  - Indo-Mesopotamia relations
  - Maritime history of Odisha
  - Silk Road
  - Ancient maritime history
- Economy
  - Economic history of India
  - Historic GDP of India (1-1947 CE)
- Museum
  - National Maritime Heritage Complex
