= Pithunda =

Pithunda was a port in the ancient kingdom of Kalinga on the eastern coast of India. Pithunda, or Prithuda was the capital of an old kingdom. The region was situated adjacent to another kingdom, which is located in Bandar taluk, now the modern Krishna district of Andhra Pradesh, not far from Masulipatam. Sylvain Levi considers that Pithunda was located to the south of Palur near Chicacola (Srikakulam in Andhra Pradesh) and Kalingapatanam.

Pithunda is described in the Jain text Uttaradhyana Sutra as an important center at the time of Mahavira (599 – 527 BC), and was frequented by merchants from Champa (now Vietnam). The Hathigumpha inscription says that Kharavela (c. 209 – 170 BC) conquered the city in his 11th regnal year. This occurred during a war between Kalinga and the Tamil confederacy to the south. After defeating the city, Kharavela is said to have ploughed it using a plough yoked to asses. Pithunda was called Pithundra in the Peripus and the Geography of Ptolemy (c. 90 – 168 AD).
