= Khalkatapatna =

Khalkatapatna was a sea port in what is now the state of Odisha on the eastern seaboard of India. The site is on the north bank of the Kushabhadra River. It was a port town during the Eastern Ganga dynasty during 12th and 15th centuries CE. Khalkatapatna was a link in the riverine and maritime navigation of Odisha and was an important port in trade with Arabian countries in the west and Indonesia and China in the east.

== Excavations ==
Excavations have been carried out at the site between 1984–85 and 1994–95. The excavations found a brick jelly floor that may have been used as a loading and unloading platform. Artifacts include two circular Chinese copper coins with square holes in the center from the 14th century AD, Chinese celadon ware and porcelain and glazed chocolate ware of Arabian origin.

The site also held wheel-turned bowls, basins, vases and miniature pots, and jewelry made of terracotta, glass and copper. The archaeological excavations shed light that the Kushabhadra river was navigable at the time, and may have been used for transportation of blocks of stone for use in the construction of the Konark Sun Temple built by King Narasimhadeva I (1236–1264 AD).

== Decline ==
Satellite images of the region and the river course have shown the river is evolving.
