= Harishpur, Odisha =

Coordinates: 20.332390°N 86.250506°E

Harishpur or Harishapur is a community in the Jagatsinghpur district of the Indian state of Odisha. The Gada Harishpur Panchayat is the location of the Sarabanta Jagatnath temple (height 82 meters) situated near by the Bay of Bengal. Most of the people here are dependent on the Bay of Bengal for their food and clothing.

Harishpur was one of the main ports of Odisha during the period of the Ganga dynasty, which ruled from the 11th century to the early 15th century. After Odisha was conquered by the Muslims in the time of Akbar, Harishpur rose to greater prominence. During the early 19th century, Harishpur was an important port for export of fabrics made in Odisha. However, the textile industry declined in the face of European imports, leading to a collapse of trade.

The community was badly affected by a super-cyclone during the 1999 North Indian Ocean cyclone season. (29 October which was a black pole for the community) In 2001, thousands of dead olive ridley sea turtles were found on the stretch of coast between Harishpur and Devi river mouth. Again in 2007, Harishpur was one of the locations on the Odisha coast where large numbers of dead turtles were found, apparently killed by mechanized fishing boats. Now about 1200 families or about 50000 of population is living in this panchayat or community. This community or panchayat is consisting of Noliasahi, Kadamnasi, Sarabanta, Gada Harish pur, Ahanda, Pathara kunda and Garia villages.

== Festivals ==
In Gada Harisha Pur panchayat, Sitala puja festival takes place at the beginning of the Gada Harish Pur village, Maa Manasha Puja festival which take place at the middle of the Gada Harish Pur Village and Ganga puja takes place at the end of the village.
