= RMS Empress of India =

RMS or SS Empress of India may refer to one of these Canadian Pacific Steamship Company ocean liners:

- RMS Empress of India (1890), a 5,905 gross register tons (GRT) ship that served Canadian Pacific until 1914; later named Loyalty; scrapped 1929
- RMS Empress of India (1908), originally the 17,500 GRT North German Lloyd ship SS Prinz Friedrich Wilhelm launched in 1907; briefly named Empress of China in 1921; renamed Empress of India; later renamed Montlaurier, Monteith, and Montnairn before being scrapped in 1929.

== See also ==
- Empress of India
