= Radhakanta Math =

Indian Hindu monastery

Coordinates: 19.800481°N 85.819130°E

Radhakanta Math is a Hindu monastery in the temple town of Puri in India.The math is renowned for having the Gambhira or the room where Chaitanya Mahaprabhu lived in Puri. His staff, water pot, bed and sandals are still preserved here. The stone idol of the presiding deity Radhakanta is said to have been brought from Kanchi by King Purushottama Deva.
