= Heritage City Development and Augmentation Yojana =

Urban planning scheme in India

Heritage City Development and Augmentation Yojana (HRIDAY)
- Country: India
- Prime Minister(s): Narendra Modi
- Launched: 21 January 2015; 11 years ago
- Budget: ₹5 billion (US$ 63,000,000)
- Status: active

National Heritage City Development and Augmentation Yojana (HRIDAY) was launched on 21 January 2015 with the aim of bringing together urban planning, economic growth and heritage conservation in an inclusive manner to preserve the heritage character of each Heritage City.

The Scheme shall support development of core heritage infrastructure projects including revitalization of linked urban infrastructure for heritage assets such as monuments, Ghats, temples etc. along with reviving certain intangible assets. These initiatives shall include development of sanitation facilities, roads, public transportation & parking, citizen services, information kiosks etc.

With a duration of four years (completing in November 2018) and a total outlay of ₹5 billion (US$ 63,000,000), the Scheme is set to be implemented in 13 identified Cities namely, Ajmer, Amaravati, Amritsar, Badami, Dwarka, Gaya, Kanchipuram, Mathura, Puri, Varanasi, Velankanni, Vellore and Warangal. scheme ended in 2019 merged into PRASHAD scheme

== Objectives ==
The objectives of the scheme are:

- Planning, development and implementation of heritage-sensitive infrastructure
- Service Delivery and infrastructure provisioning in the core areas of the historic city
- Preserve and revitalise heritage wherein tourists can connect directly with city's unique character
- Develop and document a heritage asset inventory of cities – natural, cultural, living and built heritage as a basis for urban planning, growth, service provision and delivery
- Implementation and enhancement of basic services delivery with focus on sanitation services like public conveniences, toilets, water taps, street lights, with use of latest technologies in improving tourist facilities/amenities.
- Local capacity enhancement for inclusive heritage-based industry

== Funding ==
HRIDAY is a central sector scheme, where 100% funding will be provided by Government of India. INR 500 Crores have been allocated to the scheme, under the following heads:

HRIDAY funding scheme
| Budget Components | Allocation (%) | Funds Allocated (₹ Crore) |
|---|---|---|
| Project Implementation | 85 | 400 + 25 |
| City PMU Establishment | 3 | 15 |
| Administrative and Operating Expenses | 1 | 5 |
| Information, Education and Communication | 4 | 20 |
| DPRs and HMP preparation | 4 | 20 |
| Capacity Development | 3 | 15 |

The scheme would be implemented in a mission mode. Each city has been granted a specific amount of fund, based on its population and size. The funding is as follows:

HRIDAY funding by city
| S.No | City | State | Funds (₹ Crore) |
|---|---|---|---|
| 1 | Ajmer | Rajasthan | 40.04 |
| 2 | Amaravati | Andhra Pradesh | 22.26 |
| 3 | Amritsar | Punjab | 69.31 |
| 4 | Badami | Karnataka | 22.26 |
| 5 | Dwaraka | Gujarat | 22.26 |
| 6 | Gaya | Bihar | 40.04 |
| 7 | Kanchipuram | Tamil Nadu | 23.04 |
| 8 | Mathura | Uttar Pradesh | 40.04 |
| 9 | Puri | Odisha | 22.54 |
| 10 | Varanasi | Uttar Pradesh | 89.31 |
| 11 | Velankanni | Tamil Nadu | 22.26 |
| 12 | Warangal | Telangana | 40.54 |
