= Puri (city) =

City in Odisha, India

- City
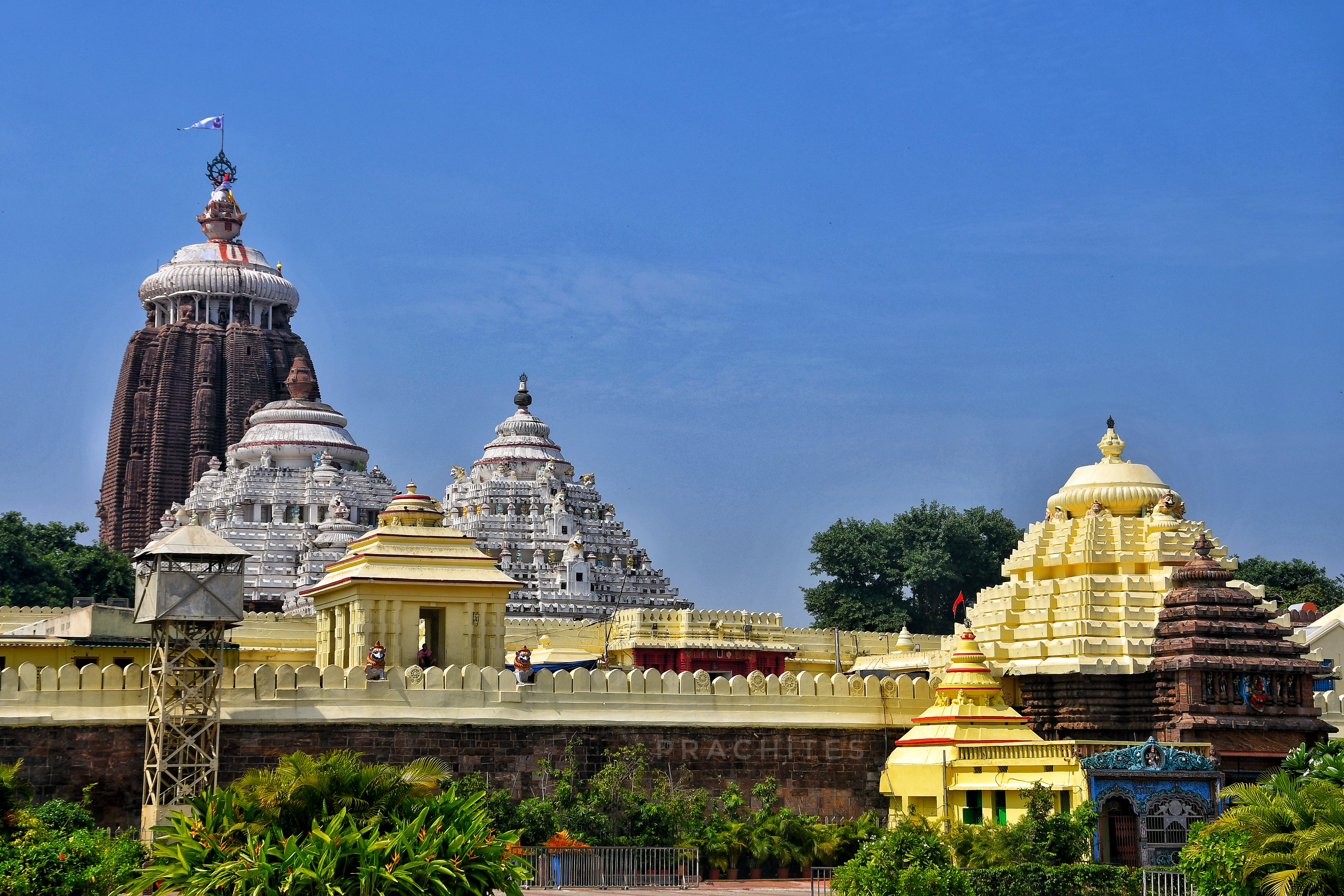
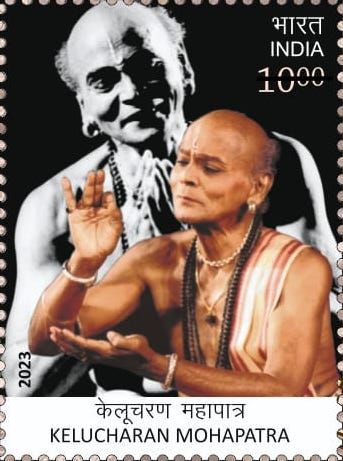
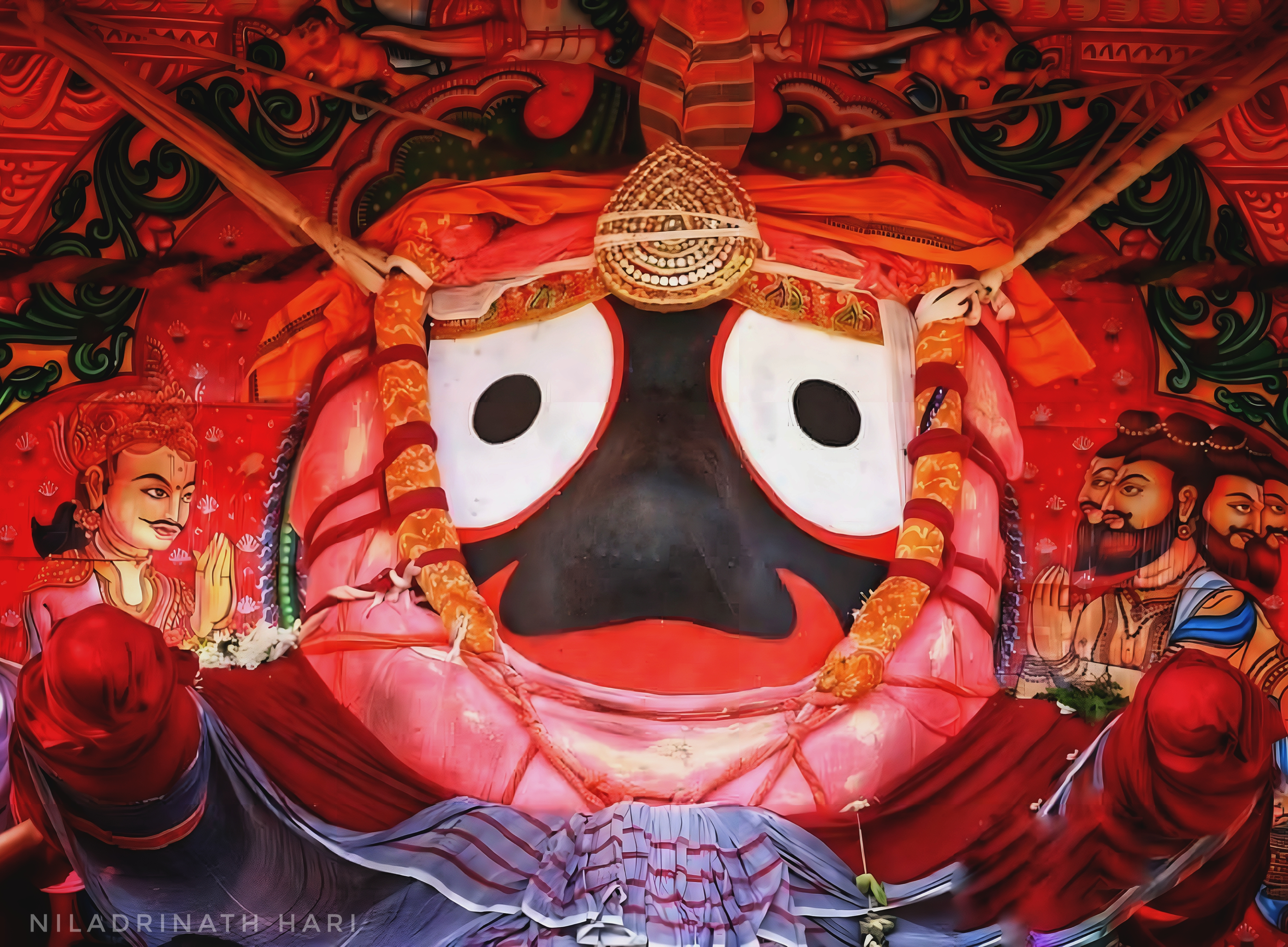
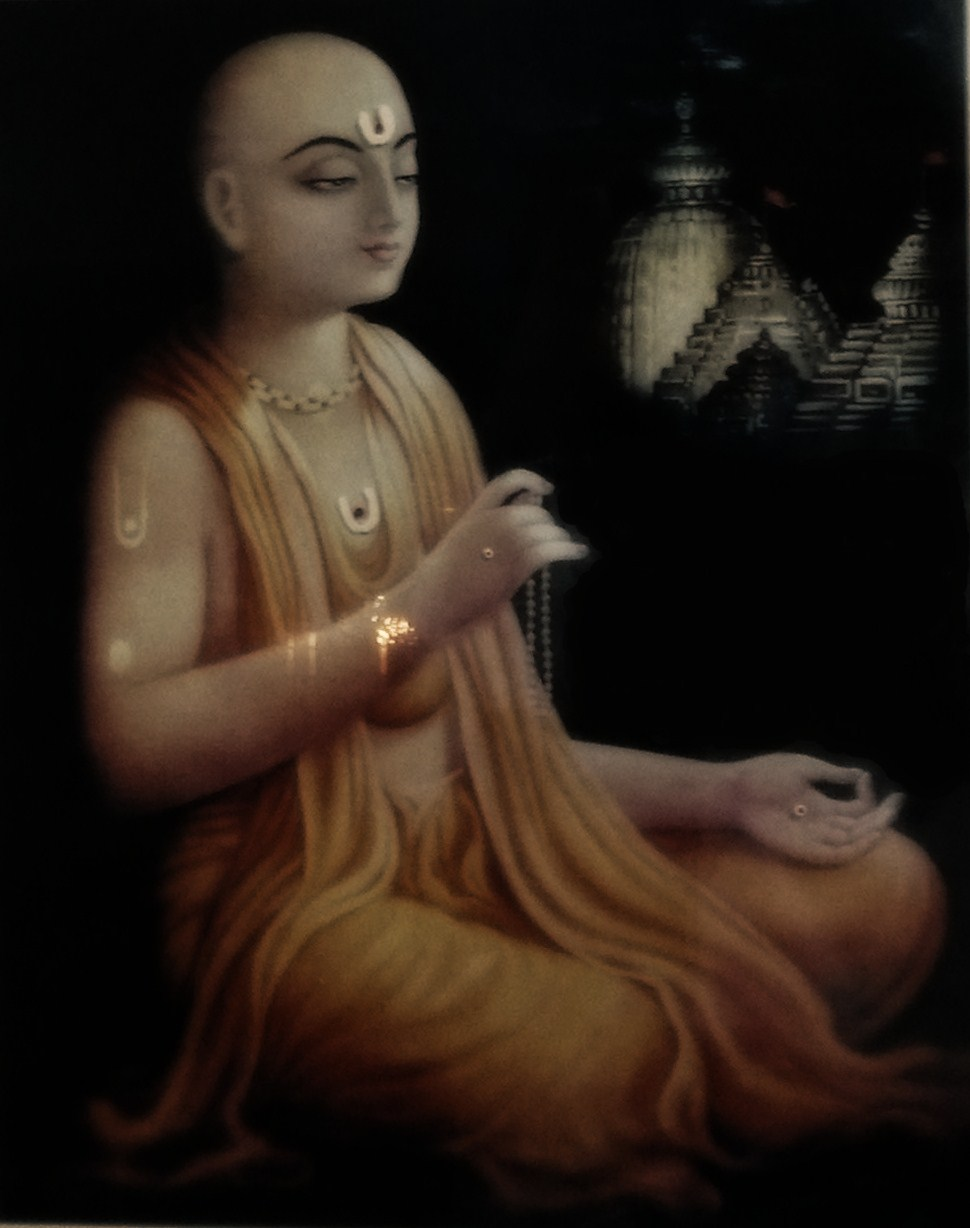
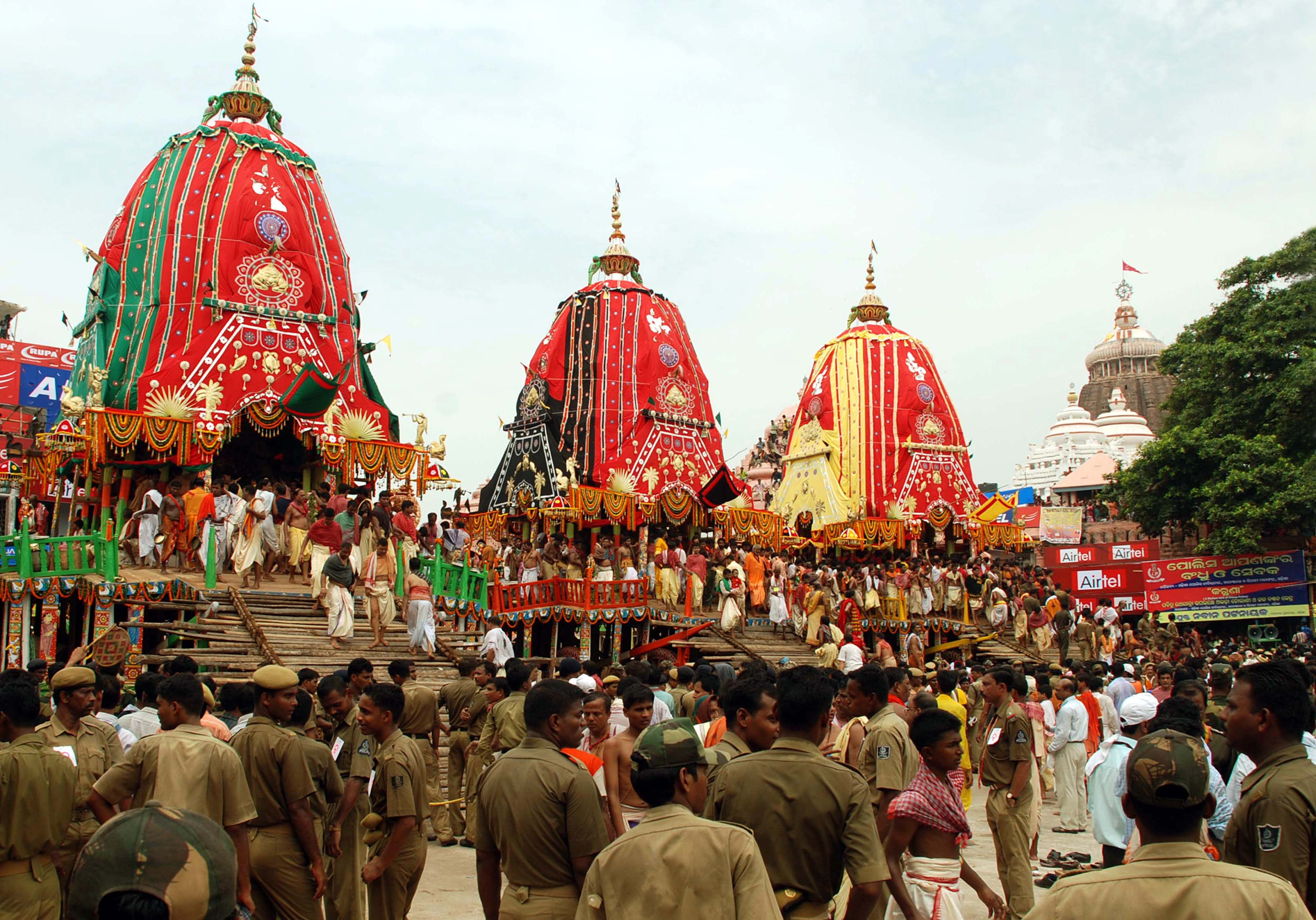
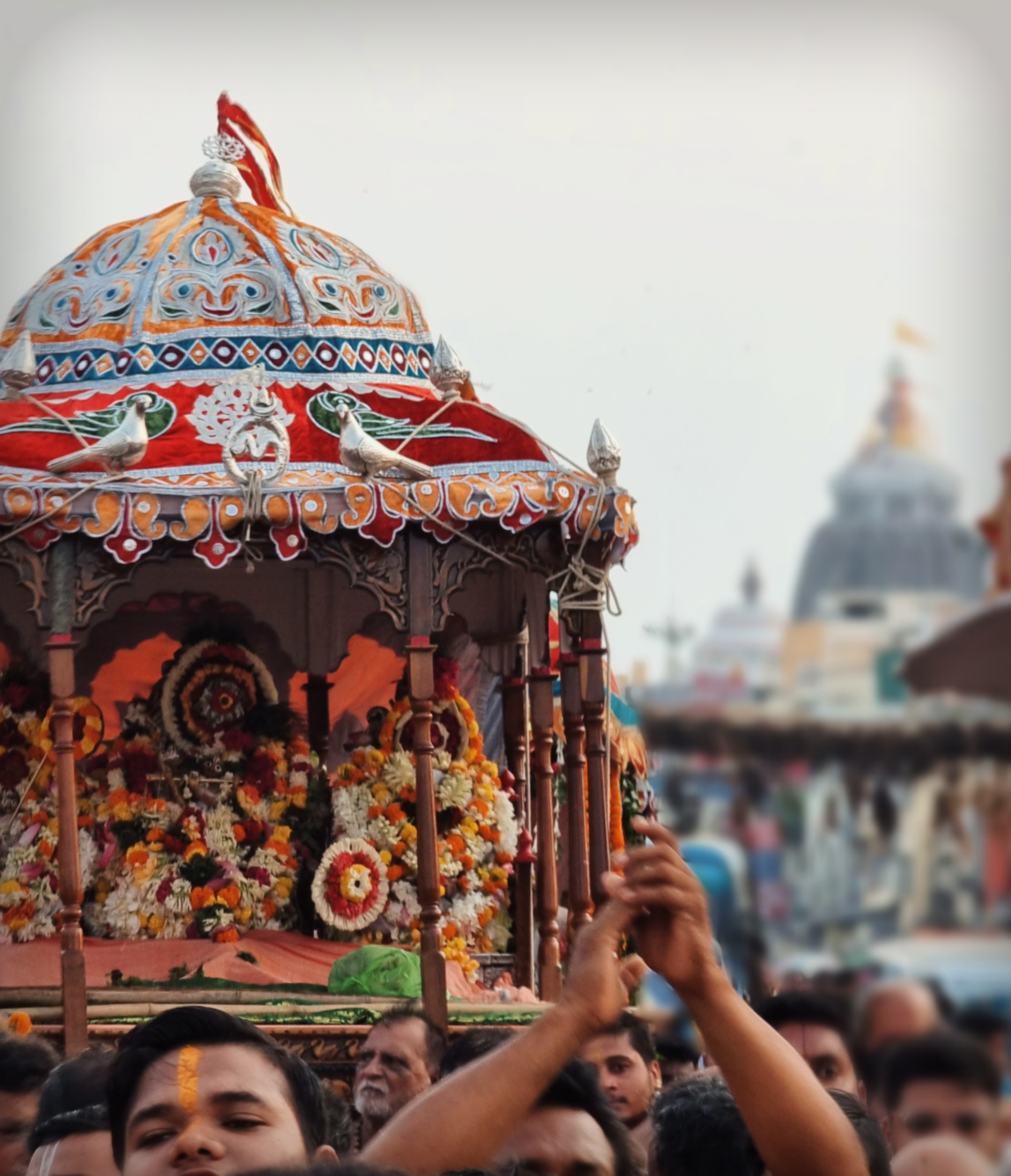
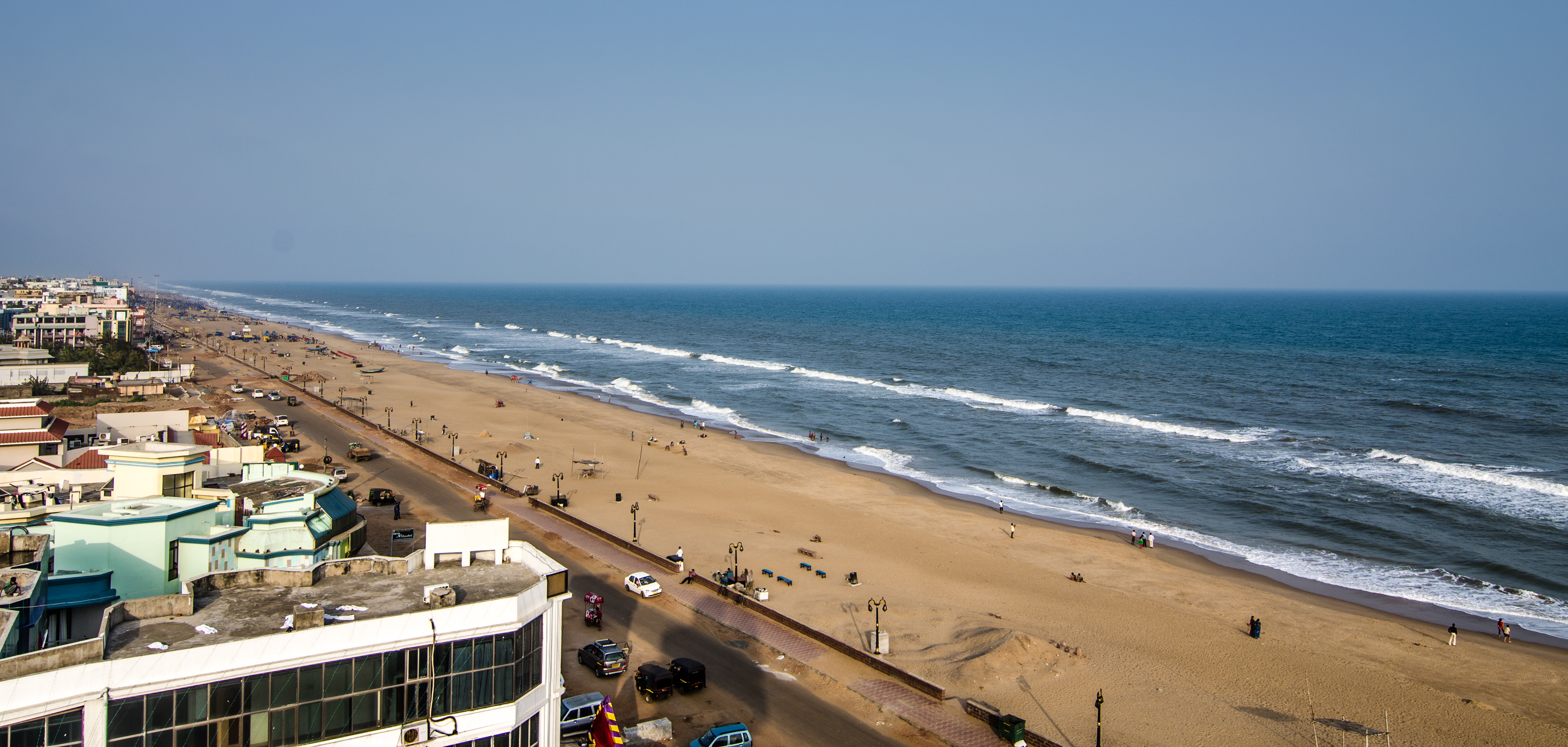
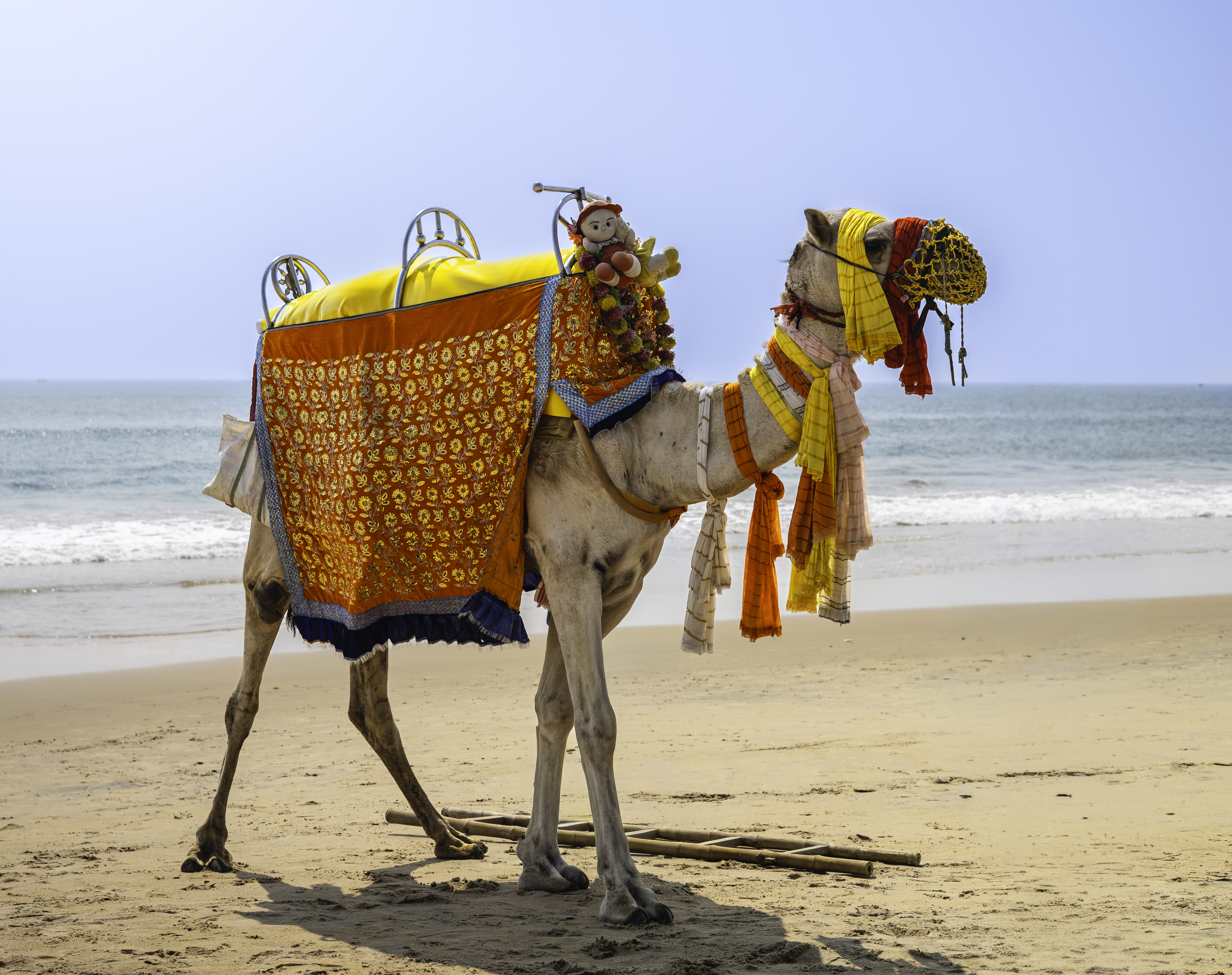
- Left to right, top to bottom: Jagannath Temple, Puri, One of the Char Dham; Kelucharan Mohapatra; Jagannath; Chaitanya Mahaprabhu; Ratha Yatra (Puri); Chandan Yatra; and Golden Beach
- Nicknames: Spiritual City, Sri Jagannath Dham
- Location within Odisha Location within India Location within Asia
- Coordinates: 19°48′38″N 85°49′53″E
- Country: India
- State: Odisha
- District: Puri
- Established: c. 8th century CE (as a permanent settlement via the Govardhan Math)
- Royal urban expansion: c. 1135 CE (Jagannath Temple construction)
- British District: 23 October 1828
- Founder: King Jajati I (Jajati Keshari) of the Somabamshi Dynasty
- Named for: Jagannath Temple

Government
  - Type: Municipal Corporation
  - Body: Puri Municipal Corporation
  - Member of Parliament: Sambit Patra (BJP)
  - Member of Legislative Assembly: Sunil Kumar Mohanty (BJD)
  - Collector & District Magistrate: Dibya Jyoti Parida, IAS
  - Superintendent of Police: Prateek Singh, IPS

Area
  - Total: 16.84 km^{2} (6.50 sq mi)
- Elevation: 0.1 m (0.33 ft)

Population (2011)
  - Total: 200,564
  - Rank: India 228th, Odisha 6th
  - Density: 11,910/km^{2} (30,850/sq mi)

Language
  - Official: Odia
- Time zone: UTC+5:30 (IST)
- PIN: 752001
- Telephone code: 06752
- Vehicle registration: OD-13
- Website: https://www.puri.odisha.gov.in

Char Dham

Puri, also known as Jagannath Puri, (Odia: [ˈpuɾi]) is a coastal city and a Municipal Corporation in the state of Odisha in eastern India. It is the district headquarters of Puri district and is situated on the Bay of Bengal, 60 kilometres (37 mi) south of the state capital of Bhubaneswar. It is home to the 12th-century Jagannath Temple and is one of the original Char Dham pilgrimage sites for Hindus. Puri has been known by several names since ancient times and was locally known as "Sri Kshetra" and the Jagannath temple is known as "Badadeula". Puri and the Jagannath Temple were invaded 18 times by Muslim rulers, from the 7th century AD until the early 19th century with the objective of looting the treasures of the temple. Odisha, including Puri and its temple, were part of British India from 1803 until India attained independence in August 1947. Even though princely states do not exist in India today, the heirs of the House of Gajapati still perform the ritual duties of the temple. The temple town has many Hindu religious mathas or monasteries.

The economy of Puri is dependent on the religious importance of the Jagannath Temple to the extent of nearly 80 per cent. The 24 festivals, including 13 major ones, held every year in the temple complex contribute to the economy; Ratha Yatra and its related festivals are the most important which are attended by millions of people every year. Sand art and applique art are some of the important crafts of the city.

Puri has been chosen as one of the heritage cities for Heritage City Development and Augmentation Yojana (HRIDAY) scheme of Government of India.

Puri is a significant part of the "Krishna pilgrimage circuit" which also includes Mathura, Vrindavan, Barsana, Gokul, Govardhan, Kurukshetra and Dwarka.

== History ==
=== Names in history ===
Puri, the holy land of Jagannatha, also known by the popular vernacular name Srikshetram, has many ancient names in the Hindu scriptures such as the Rigveda, Matsya purana, Brahma Purana, Narada Purana, Padma Purana, Skanda Purana, Kapila Purana and Niladrimahodaya. In the Rigveda, in particular, it is mentioned as a place called Purushamandama-grama meaning the place where the Creator deity of the world – Supreme Divinity deified on an altar or mandapa was venerated near the coast and prayers offered with Vedic hymns. Over time the name got changed to Purushottama Puri and further shortened to Puri, and the Purusha came to be known as Jagannatha. Sages like Bhrigu, Atri and Markandeya had their hermitage close to this place. Its name is mentioned, conforming to the deity worshipped, as Srikshetra, Purusottama Dhāma, Purusottama Kshetra, Purusottama Puri and Jagannath Puri. Puri, however, is the popular usage. It is also known by the geographical features of its location as Shankhakshetra (the layout of the town is in the form of a conch shell), Neelāchala ("Blue mountain" a terminology used to name a very large sand lagoon over which the temple was built but this name is not in vogue), Neelāchalakshetra, Neelādri. In Sanskrit, the word "Puri" means town or city, and is cognate with polis in Greek.

Another ancient name is Charita as identified by General Alexander Cunningham of the Archaeological Survey of India, which was later spelled as Che-li-ta-lo by the Chinese traveller Xuanzang. When the present temple was built by the Eastern Ganga king Anantavarman Chodaganga in the 11th and 12th centuries AD, it was called Purushottamkshetra. However, the Moghuls, the Marathas and early British rulers called it Purushottama-chhatar or just Chhatar. In Moghul ruler Akbar's Ain-i-Akbari and subsequent Muslim historical records it was known as Purushottama. In the Sanskrit drama Anargha Raghava Nataka as well, authored by Murari Mishra, a playwright, in the 8th century AD, it is referred to as Purushottama. It was only after the 12th century AD that Puri came to be known by the shortened form of Jagannatha Puri, named after the deity or in a short form as Puri. It is the only shrine in India, where Radha, along with Lakshmi, Saraswati, Durga, Bhudevi, Sati, Parvati, and Shakti, abodes with Krishna, who is also known by the name Jagannatha.

=== Ancient period ===
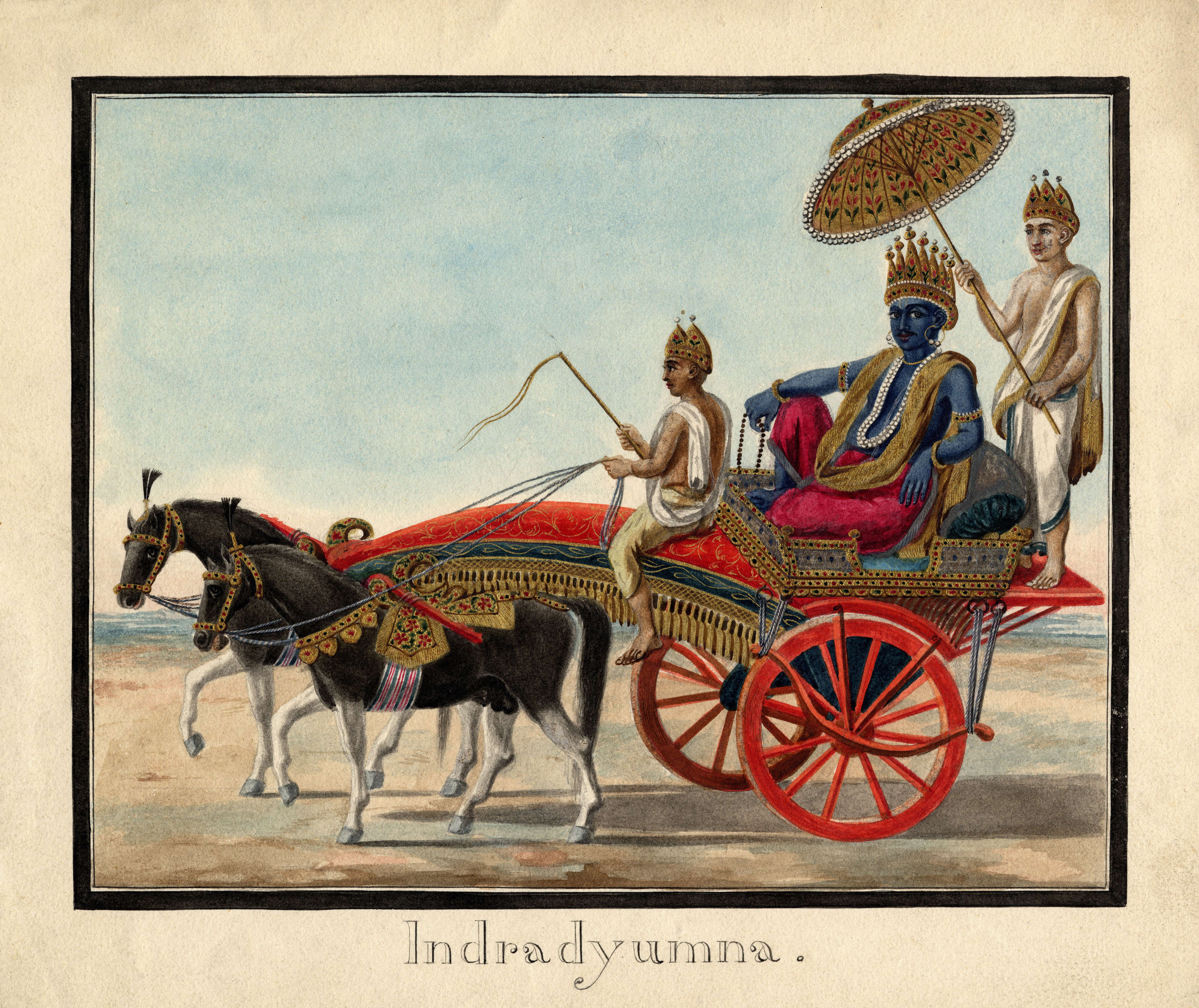
King Indradyumna of Ujjayani credited with building the original Puri Jagannath temple in 318 AD

According to the chronicle Madala Panji, in 318 AD, the priests and servitors of the temple spirited away the idols to escape the wrath of the Rashtrakuta king Rakatavahu. In the temple's historical records it finds mention in the Brahma Purana and Skanda Purana stating that the temple was built by the king Indradyumna, Ujjayani.

S. N. Sadasivan, a historian, in his book A Social History of India quotes William Joseph Wilkins, author of the book Hindu Mythology, Vedic and Purānic as stating that in Puri, Buddhism was once a well established practice but later Buddhism faded and Brahmanism became the order of the religious practice in the town; the Buddha deity is now worshipped by the Hindus as Jagannatha. It is also said by Wilkinson that some relics of Buddha were placed inside the idol of Jagannatha which the Brahmins claimed were the bones of Krishna. Even during Maurya king Ashoka's reign in 240 BC, Kalinga was a Buddhist center and that a tribe known as Lohabahu (barbarians from outside Odisha) converted to Buddhism and built a temple with a statue of Buddha which is now worshipped as Jagannatha. Wilkinson also says that the Lohabahu deposited some Buddha relics in the precincts of the temple.

Construction of the present Jagannath Temple started in 1136 AD and completed towards the latter part of the 12th century. The Eastern Ganga king Anangabhima III dedicated his kingdom to Jagannatha, then known as the Purushottama-Jagannatha, and resolved that from then on he and his descendants would rule under "divine order as Jagannatha's sons and vassals". Even though princely states do not exist in India today, the heirs of the Puri Estate still perform the ritual duties of the temple; the king formally sweeps the road in front of the chariots before the start of the Ratha Yatra. This ritual is called Cherra Pahanra.

=== Medieval and early modern periods ===
The history of Puri is on the same lines as that of the Jagannath Temple, which was invaded 18 times during its history to plunder the treasures of the temple, rather than for religious reasons. The first invasion occurred in the 8th century AD by Rastrakuta king Govinda III (798–814 AD), and the last took place in 1881 AD by the monotheistic followers of Alekh (Mahima Dharma) who did not recognise the worship of Jagannatha. From 1205 AD onward there were many invasions of the city and its temple by Muslims of Afghan and Moghul descent, known as Yavanas or foreigners. In most of these invasions the idols were taken to safe places by the priests and the servitors of the temple. Destruction of the temple was prevented by timely resistance or surrender by the kings of the region. However, the treasures of the temple were repeatedly looted. The table lists all the 18 invasions along with the status of the three images of the temple, the triad of Jagannatha, Balabhadra and Subhadra following each invasion.

Invasion number	Invader (s), year (s) AD	Local rulers	Status of the three images of the Jagannath temple
1	Raktabahu or Govinda III (798–814) of the Rashtrakuta Empire	King Subhanadeva of Bhaumakara dynasty	Idols shifted to Gopali near Sonepur. Were brought back to Puri by Yayati I after 146 years and re-consecrated after performing Nabakalebara.
2	Illias Shah, Sultan of Bengal, 1340	Narasinghadeva III	Images shifted to a secret location.
3	Feroz Shah Tughlaq, 1360	Ganga King Bhanudeva III	Images not found, though rumoured that they were thrown into the Bay of Bengal.
4	Ismail Ghazi commander of Alauddin Hussain Shah of Bengal, 1509	King Prataprudradeva	Images shifted to Chandhei Guha Pahada near Chilika Lake.
5	Kalapahara, army assistant general of Sulaiman Karrani of the Afghan Sultan of Bengal, 1568	Mukundadeva Harichandan	Images initially hidden in an island in Chilika Lake. However, the invader took the idols from here to the banks of the Ganges River and burnt them. Bisher Mohanty, a Vaishnavite saint, who had followed the invading army, retrieved the Brahmas and hid it in a drum at Khurdagada in 1575 AD and finally re-installed it in the deities. Deities were brought back to Puri and consecrated in the Jagannath Temple.
6	Suleman, the son of Kuthu Khan and Osman, the son of Isha (ruler of Orissa), 1592	Ramachandradeva, the Bhoi dynasty ruler of Khurda	Revolt was by local Muslim rulers who desecrated the images.
7	Mirza Khurum, the commander of Islam Khan I, the Nawab of Bengal, 1601	Purushottamadeva of Bhoi Dynasty	Image moved to Kapileswarpur village by boat through the river Bhargavi and kept in the Panchamukhi Gosani temple. Thereafter, the deities were kept in Dobandha—Pentha.
8	Hasim Khan, the Subedar of Orissa, 1608	Purushottam Deva, the King of Khurda	Images shifted to the Gopal temple at Khurda and brought back in 1608.
9	Kesodasmaru, 1610	Purusottamdeva, the king of Khurda	Images kept at the Gundicha Temple and brought back to Puri after eight months.
10	Kalyan Malla, 1611	Purushottamadeva, the King of Khurda	Images moved to 'Mahisanasi' also known as'Brahmapura' or 'Chakanasi' in the Chilika Lake where they remained for one year.
11	Kalyan Malla, 1612	Paiks of Purushottamadeva, the King of Khurda	Images placed on a fleet of boats at Gurubai Gada and hidden under the 'Lotani Baragachha' or Banyan tree) and then at 'Dadhibaman Temple'.
12	Mukarram Khan, 1617	Purushottama Deva, the King of Khurda	Images moved to the Bankanidhi temple, Gobapadar and brought back to Puri in 1620.
13	Mirza Ahmad Beg, 1621	Narasingha Deva	Images shifted to 'Andharigada' in the mouth of the river Shalia across the Chilika Lake. Moved back to Puri in 1624.
14	Amir Mutaquad Khan alias Mirza Makki, 1645	Narasingha Deva and Gangadhar	Not known.
15	Amir Fateh Khan, 1647	Not known	Not known
16	Ekram Khan and Mastram Khan on behalf of Mughal Emperor Aurangzeb, 1692	Divyasingha Deva, the king of Khurda	Images moved to 'Maa Bhagabati Temple' and then to Bada Hantuada in Banpur across the Chilika Lake, and finally brought back to Puri in 1699.
17	Muhammad Taqi Khan, 1731 and 1733	Birakishore Deva and Birakishore Deva of Athagada	Images moved to Hariswar in Banpur, Chikili in Khalikote, Rumagarh in Kodala, Athagada in Ganjam and lastly to Marda in Kodala. Shifted back to Puri after 2.5 years.
18	Followers of Mahima Dharma, 1881	Birakishore Deva and Birakishore Deva of Athagada	Images burnt in the streets.

Puri is the site of the Govardhana Matha, one of the four cardinal institutions established by Adi Shankaracharya, when he visited Puri in 810 AD, and since then it has become an important dham (divine centre) for the Hindus; the others being those at Sringeri, Dwarka and Jyotirmath. The Matha (monastery of various Hindu sects) is headed by Jagatguru Shankarachrya. It is a local belief about these dhams that Vishnu takes his dinner at Puri, has his bath at Rameshwaram, spends the night at Dwarka and does penance at Badrinath.

In the 16th century, Chaitanya Mahaprabhu of Bengal established the Bhakti movements of India, now known by the name the Hare Krishna movement. He spent many years as a devotee of Jagannatha at Puri; he is said to have merged with the deity. There is also a matha of Chaitanya Mahaprabhu here known as Radhakanta Math.

In the 17th century, for the sailors sailing on the east coast of India, the temple served as a landmark, being located in a plaza in the centre of the city, which they called the "White Pagoda" while the Konark Sun Temple, 60 kilometres (37 mi) away to the east of Puri, was known as the "Black Pagoda".

The iconic representation of the images in the Jagannath temple is believed to be the forms derived from the worship made by the tribal groups of Sabaras belonging to northern Odisha. These images are replaced at regular intervals as the wood deteriorates. This replacement is a special event carried out ritualistically by special group of carpenters.

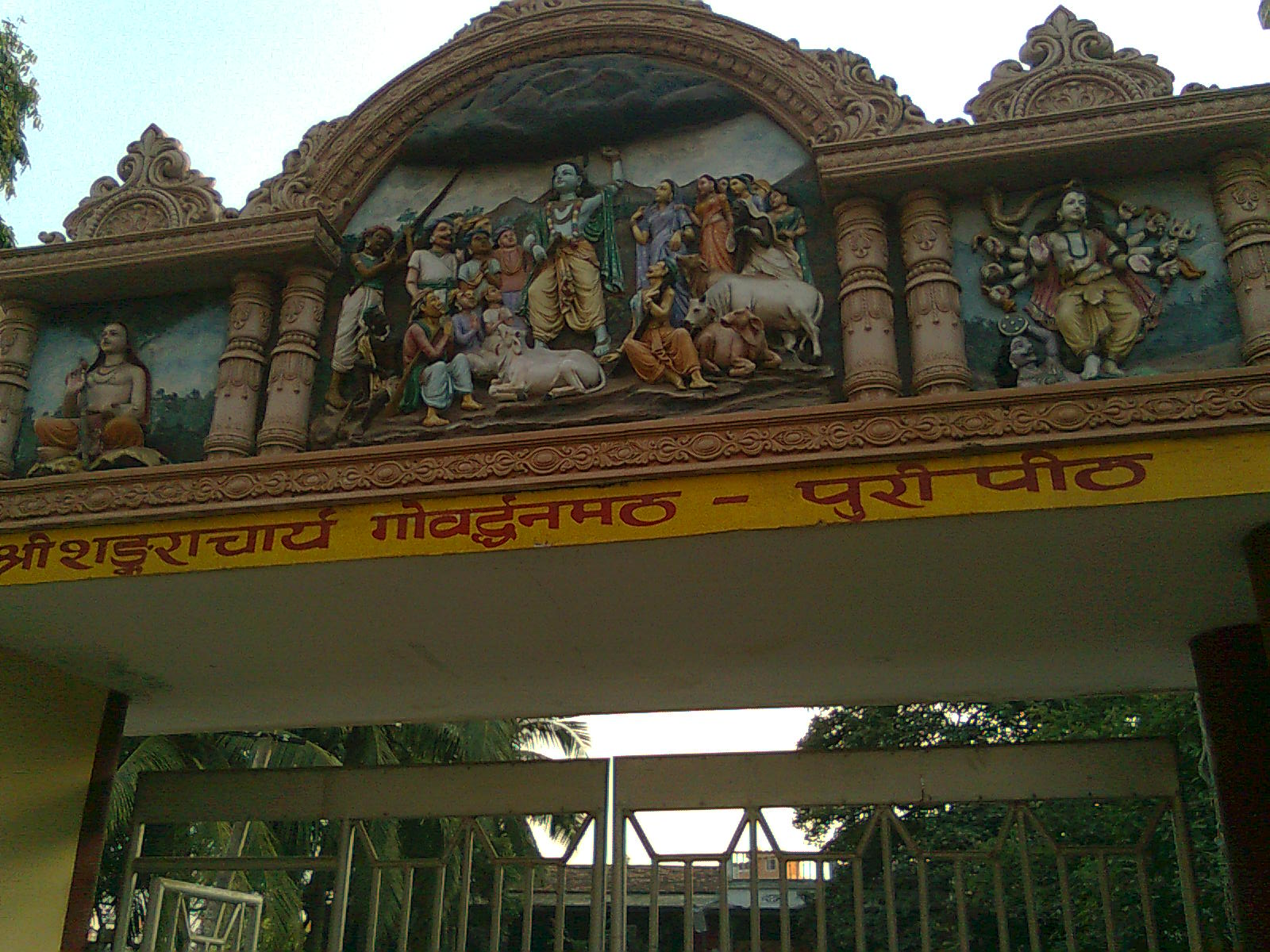
Govardhana matha main gate

The city has many other Mathas as well. The Emar Matha was founded by the Tamil Vaishnava saint Ramanujacharya in the 12th century AD. This Matha, now destroyed, was located in front of Simhadvara across the eastern corner of the Jagannath Temple, and reported to have been built in the 16th century during the reign of kings of Suryavamsi Gajapatis. The Matha was in the news on 25 February 2011 for the large cache of 522 silver slabs unearthed from a closed chamber.

The British conquered Orissa in 1803, and, recognising the importance of the Jagannath Temple in the life of the people of the state, they initially appointed an official to look after the temple's affairs and later declared the temple as part of a district.

=== Modern history ===
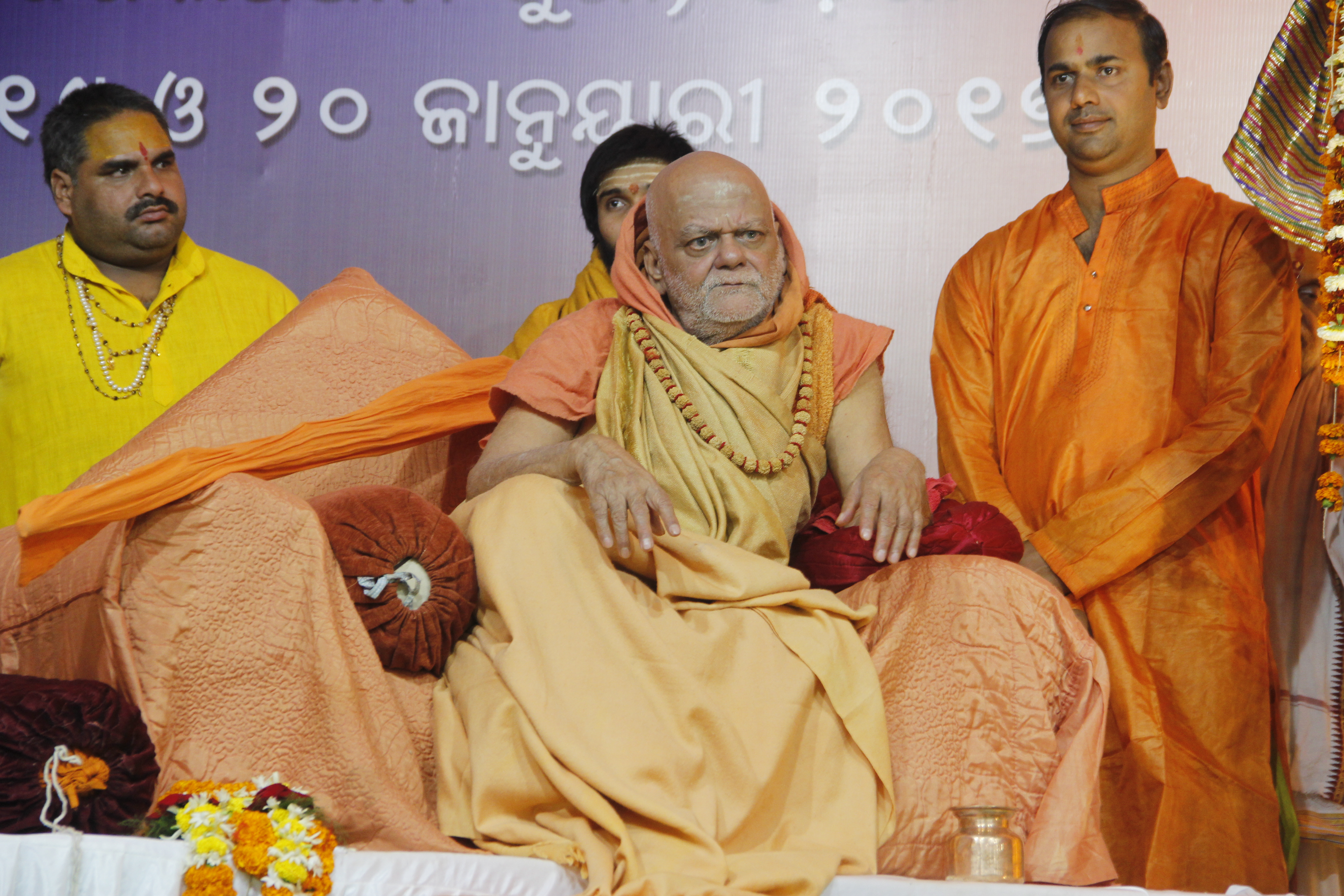
H.H Jagadguru Swami Nischalananda Saraswati, The Shankaracharya of Puri

In 1906, Sri Yukteswar, an exponent of Kriya Yoga and a resident of Puri, established an ashram, a spiritual training center, named "Karar Ashram" in Puri. He died on 9 March 1936 and his body is buried in the garden of the ashram.

The city is the site of the former summer residence of British Raj, the Raj Bhavan, built in 1913–14 during the era of governors.

For the people of Puri, Jagannatha, visualised as Krishna, is synonymous with their city. They believe that Jagannatha looks after the welfare of the state. However, after the partial collapse of the Jagannath Temple (in the Amalaka part of the temple) on 14 June 1990, people became apprehensive and considered it a bad omen for Odisha. The replacement of the fallen stone by another of the same size and weight (7 tonnes (7.7 tons)), that could be done only in the early morning hours after the temple gates were opened, was done on 28 February 1991.

Puri has been chosen as one of the heritage cities for the Heritage City Development and Augmentation Yojana scheme of the Indian Government. It is chosen as one of the 12 heritage cities with "focus on holistic development" to be implemented within 27 months by the end of March 2017.

In January 2024, the Shree Jagannath Heritage Corridor (also called "Srimandir Parikrama") was inaugurated to enhance security and ease of movement around the Jagannath Temple. The project includes a 75-meter corridor, improved drainage, CCTV surveillance, and dedicated zones for pilgrims and servitors. Its implementation needed the tearing down of several ancient buildings and historic institutions that formed the sanctuary's core outer landscape, such as the Emar Mutt and its Raghunandan library.

Non-Hindus are not permitted to enter the shrines but were historically allowed to view the temple and the proceedings from the roof of the erstwhile Raghunandan library, originally located within the precincts of the temple, for a small donation.

== Geography and climate ==
=== Geography ===
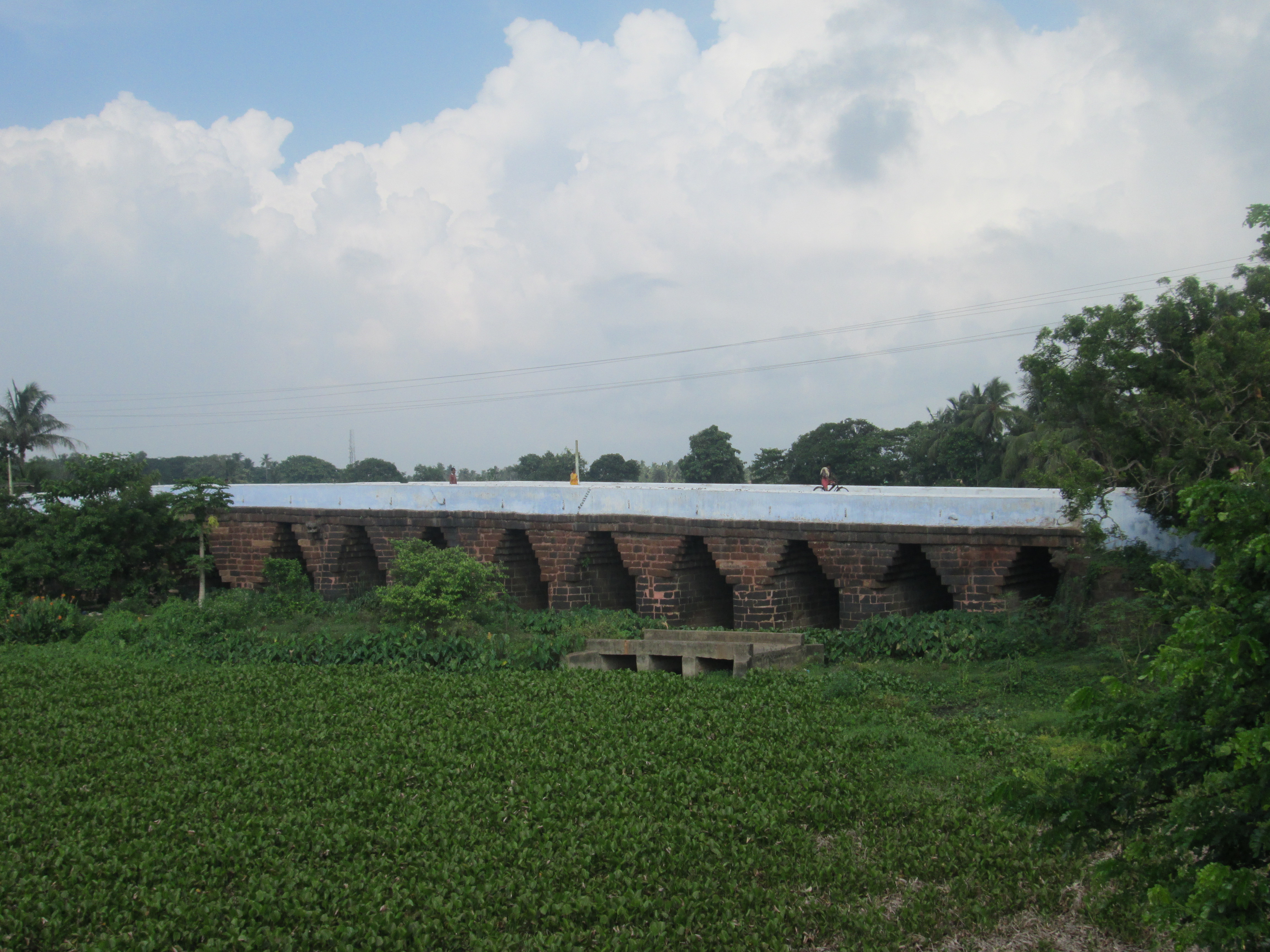
The Atharanala Bridge dating back to the 16th century at the entrance of Puri

Puri, located on the east coast of India on the Bay of Bengal, is in the centre of the Puri district. It is delimited by the Bay of Bengal on the southeast, the Mauza Sipaurubilla on the west, Mauza Gopinathpur in the north and Mauza Balukhand in the east. It is within the 67 kilometres (42 mi) coastal stretch of sandy beaches that extends between Chilika Lake and the south of Puri city. However, the administrative jurisdiction of the Puri Municipality extends over an area of 16.3268 square kilometres (6.3038 sq mi) spread over 30 wards, which includes a shore line of 5 kilometres (3.1 mi).

Puri is in the coastal delta of the Mahanadi River on the shores of the Bay of Bengal. In the ancient days it was near to Sisupalgarh (also known as "Ashokan Tosali"). Then the land was drained by a tributary of the Bhargavi River, a branch of the Mahanadi River. This branch underwent a meandering course creating many arteries altering the estuary, and formed many sand hills. These sand hills could be cut through by the streams. Because of the sand hills, the Bhargavi River, flowing to the south of Puri, moved away towards the Chilika Lake. This shift also resulted in the creation of two lagoons, known as Sar and Samang, on the eastern and northern parts of Puri respectively. Sar lagoon has a length of 5 miles (8.0 km) in an east–west direction and a width of 2 miles (3.2 km) in north–south direction. The estuary of the Bhargavi River has a shallow depth of just 5 feet (1.5 m) and the process of siltation continues. According to a 15th-century Odia writer Saraladasa, the bed of the unnamed stream that flowed at the base of the Blue Mountain or Neelachal was filled up. Katakarajavamsa, a 16th-century chronicle (c.1600), attributes filling up of the bed of the river which flowed through the present Grand Road, as done during the reign of King Narasimha II (1278–1308) of Eastern Ganga dynasty.

=== Climate ===
According to the Köppen–Geiger climate classification system the climate of Puri is classified as Aw (Tropical savanna climate). The city has moderate and tropical climate. Humidity is fairly high throughout the year. The temperature during summer touches a maximum of 36 °C (97 °F) and during winter it is 17 °C (63 °F). The average annual rainfall is 1,337 millimetres (52.6 in) and the average annual temperature is 26.9 °C (80.4 °F). The weather data is given in the following table.

Climate data for Puri (1991–2020, extremes 1901–2012)
Month	Jan	Feb	Mar	Apr	May	Jun	Jul	Aug	Sep	Oct	Nov	Dec	Year
Record high °C (°F)	33.4 (92.1)	35.8 (96.4)	40.0 (104.0)	41.1 (106.0)	42.2 (108.0)	44.2 (111.6)	37.6 (99.7)	36.8 (98.2)	39.1 (102.4)	36.1 (97.0)	34.2 (93.6)	32.8 (91.0)	44.2 (111.6)
Mean daily maximum °C (°F)	27.3 (81.1)	29.4 (84.9)	31.4 (88.5)	32.3 (90.1)	33.2 (91.8)	32.7 (90.9)	31.9 (89.4)	31.8 (89.2)	32.3 (90.1)	32.1 (89.8)	30.2 (86.4)	28.2 (82.8)	31.1 (88.0)
Mean daily minimum °C (°F)	17.5 (63.5)	21.5 (70.7)	25.1 (77.2)	26.5 (79.7)	27.7 (81.9)	27.6 (81.7)	26.9 (80.4)	26.8 (80.2)	26.8 (80.2)	25.1 (77.2)	21.2 (70.2)	17.7 (63.9)	24.2 (75.6)
Record low °C (°F)	10.6 (51.1)	12.2 (54.0)	12.1 (53.8)	17.4 (63.3)	16.7 (62.1)	19.4 (66.9)	19.4 (66.9)	20.9 (69.6)	17.0 (62.6)	16.3 (61.3)	11.8 (53.2)	8.6 (47.5)	8.6 (47.5)
Average rainfall mm (inches)	15.9 (0.63)	12.5 (0.49)	16.3 (0.64)	26.6 (1.05)	72.3 (2.85)	171.5 (6.75)	340.9 (13.42)	360.9 (14.21)	272.1 (10.71)	204.4 (8.05)	56.8 (2.24)	15.4 (0.61)	1,565.7 (61.64)
Average rainy days	0.8	1.0	1.2	1.4	3.8	8.2	12.0	13.5	10.9	7.5	2.1	0.4	62.9
Average relative humidity (%) (at 17:30 IST)	70	74	79	83	83	82	84	83	81	74	66	63	77
Source: India Meteorological Department

== Demographics ==
Historical population
Year	Pop.	±%
1872	22,263	—
1881	22,095	−0.8%
1891	28,794	+30.3%
1901	49,334	+71.3%
1911	39,686	−19.6%
1921	38,694	−2.5%
1931	37,568	−2.9%
1941	41,055	+9.3%
1951	49,057	+19.5%
1961	60,815	+24.0%
1971	72,674	+19.5%
1981	100,942	+38.9%
1991	125,199	+24.0%
2001	157,837	+26.1%
2011	200,567	+27.1%
Source: Census of India

Religious Demographic in Puri Municipality (2011)
1. Hinduism (97.8%)
2. Christianity (1.64%)
3. Other (0.52%)

According to the 2011 Census of India, Puri is an urban agglomeration governed by the Municipal Corporation in Odisha state, with a population of 200,564, comprising 104,086 males, 96,478 females, and 18,471 children (under six years of age). The sex ratio is 927. The average literacy rate in the city is 88.03 per cent (91.38 per cent for males and 84.43 per cent for females).

=== Religion ===
The overwhelming majority of the people in the city (98%) are Hindus, with a small Christian population.

=== Language ===
Languages spoken in Puri Municipality (2011)
1. Odia (83.8%)
2. Telugu (12.4%)
3. Bengali (2.29%)
4. Hindi (0.85%)
5. Urdu (0.44%)
6. Others (0.22%)

Majority of the people speaks Odia, followed by a large minority of Telugu speakers, with substantial number of Bengali and Hindi speakers.

== Administration ==
The Puri Municipality, Puri Konark Development Authority, Public Health Engineering Organisation and Orissa Water Supply Sewerage Board are some of the principal organisations that are devolved with the responsibility of providing for civic amenities such as water supply, sewerage, waste management, street lighting and infrastructure of roads. The major activity, which puts maximum pressure on these organisations, is the annual event of the Ratha Yatra held during June- July. According to the Puri Municipality more than a million people attend this event. Hence, development activities such as infrastructure and amenities to the pilgrims, apart from security, gets priority attention.

The civic administration of Puri is the responsibility of the Puri Municipality. The municipality came into existence in 1864 in the name of the Puri Improvement Trust, which was converted into Puri Municipality in 1881. After India's independence in 1947, the Orissa Municipal Act (1950) was promulgated entrusting the administration of the city to the Puri Municipality. This body is represented by elected representatives with a chairperson and councillors representing the 30 wards within the municipal limits.

The electricity is provided by Tata Power Central Odisha Distribution Limited in the city and the entire district.

== Economy ==
The economy of Puri is dependent on tourism to the extent of about 80 per cent. The temple is the focal point of the city and provides employment to the people of the town. Agricultural production of rice, ghee, vegetables and so forth of the region meet the large requirements of the temple. Many settlements around the town exclusively cater to the other religious requirements of the temple. The temple administration employs 6,000 men to perform the rituals. The temple also provides economic sustenance to 20,000 people. According to Colleen Taylor Sen, an author on food and travel, writing on the food culture of India, the temple kitchen has 400 cooks serving food to as many as 100,000 people. According to J Mohapatra, Director, Ind Barath Power Infra Ltd (IBPIL), the kitchen is known as "a largest and biggest kitchen of the world."

== Culture and cityscape ==
=== Landmarks ===
==== Jagannath Temple at Puri ====
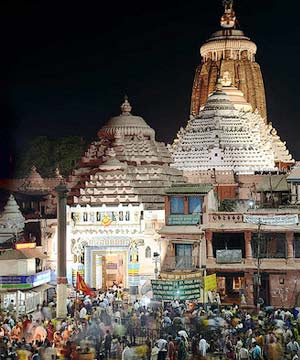
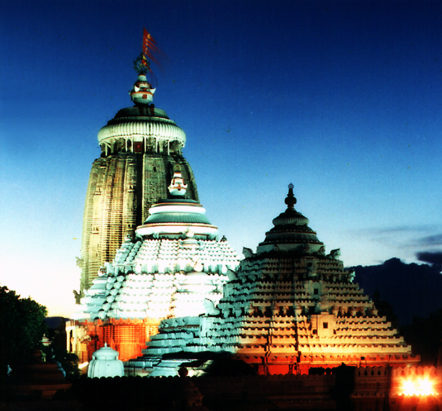
Left: Jagannath Temple at Puri Right: View of the temple at night

The Jagannath Temple at Puri is one of the major Hindu temples built in the Kalinga style of architecture. The temple tower, with a spire, rises to a height of 58 metres (190 ft), and a flag is unfurled above it, fixed over a wheel (chakra).

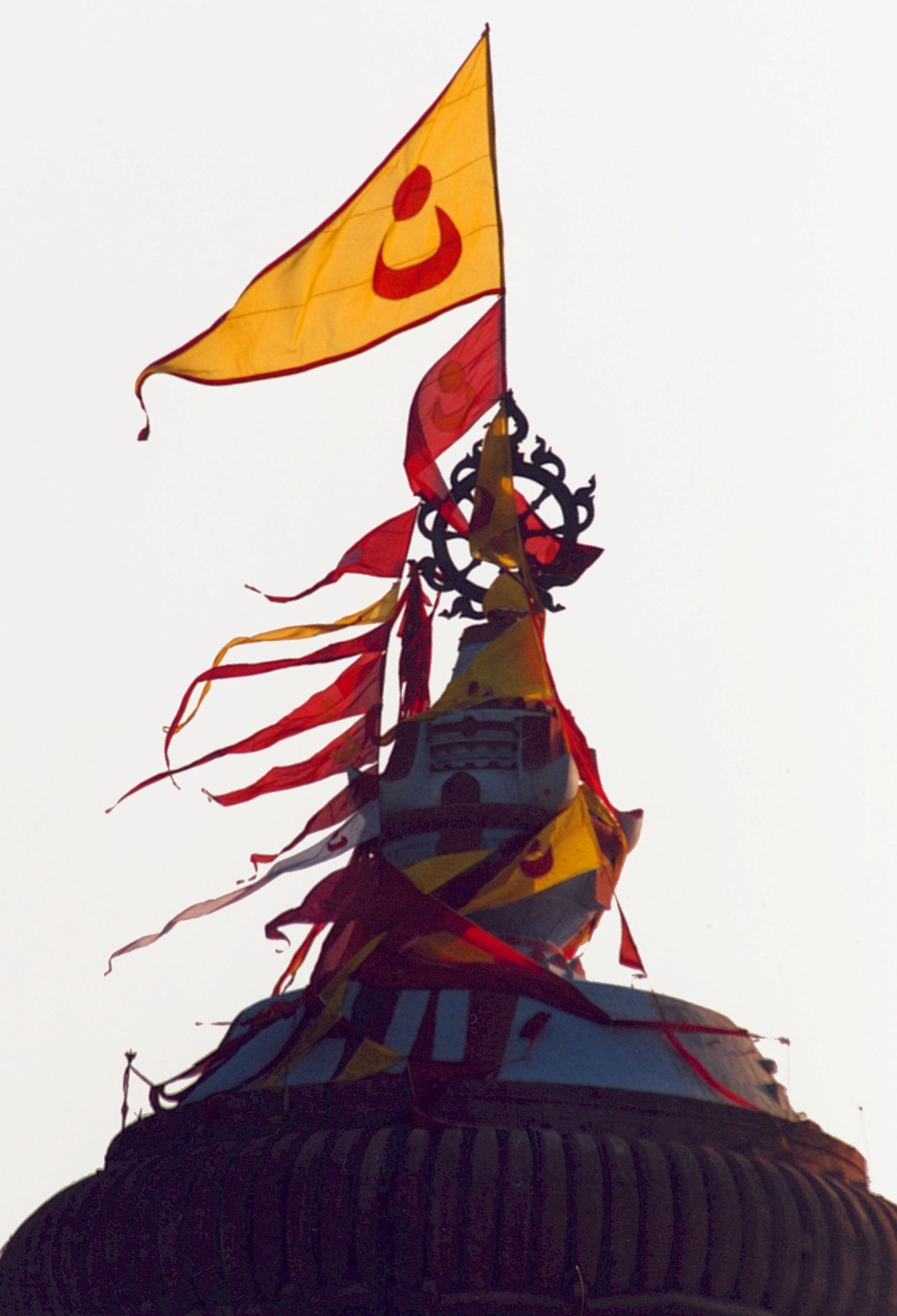
Left:Ritual chakra and flags at the top shikhara of Puri temple of Jagannatha also related to Sudarsana chakra. The red flag (12 hand or 14 feet (4.3 m) denotes that Jagannath is within the temple.

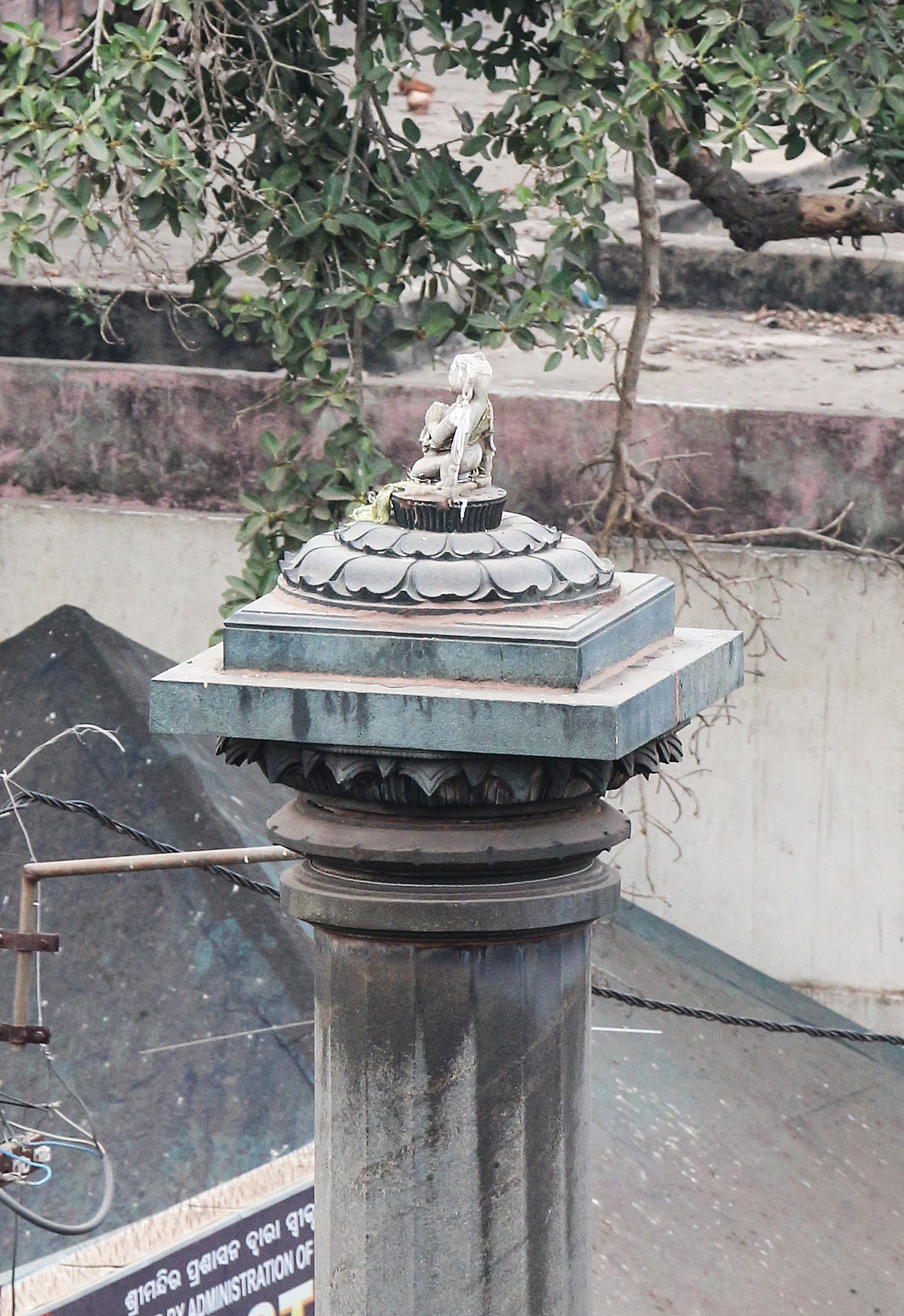
Right: Statue of Aruna the charioteer of the Sun God on top of the Aruna Stambha in front of the Singhadwara

The temple is built on an elevated platform (of about 420,000 square feet (39,000 m^{2}) area), 20 feet (6.1 m) above the adjacent area. The temple rises to a height of 214 feet (65 m) above the road level. The temple complex covers an area of 10.7 acres (4.3 ha). There are four entry gates in four cardinal directions of the temple, each gate located at the central part of the walls. These gates are: the eastern gate called the Singhadwara (Lions Gate), the southern gate known as Ashwa Dwara (Horse Gate), the western gate called the Vyaghra Dwara (Tigers Gate) or the Khanja Gate, and the northern gate called the Hathi Dwara or (elephant gate). These four gates symbolise the four fundamental principles of Dharma (right conduct), Jnana (knowledge), Vairagya (renunciation) and Aishwarya (prosperity). The gates are crowned with pyramid shaped structures. There is a stone pillar in front of the Singhadwara, called the Aruna Stambha {Solar Pillar}, 11 metres (36 ft) in height with 16 faces, made of chlorite stone; at the top of the stamba an elegant statue of Aruṇa (Sun) in a prayer mode is mounted. This pillar was shifted from the Konarak Sun Temple. The four gates are decorated with guardian statues in the form of lion, horse mounted men, tigers, and elephants in the name and order of the gates. A pillar made of fossilised wood is used for placing lamps as offering. The Lion Gate (Singhadwara) is the main gate to the temple, which is guarded by two guardian deities Jaya and Vijaya. The main gate is ascended through 22 steps known as Baisi Pahaca, which are revered, as it is believed to possess "spiritual animation". Children are made to roll down these steps, from top to bottom, to bring them spiritual happiness. After entering the temple, on the left side, there is a large kitchen where food is prepared in hygienic conditions in huge quantities; the kitchen is called as "the biggest hotel of the world".

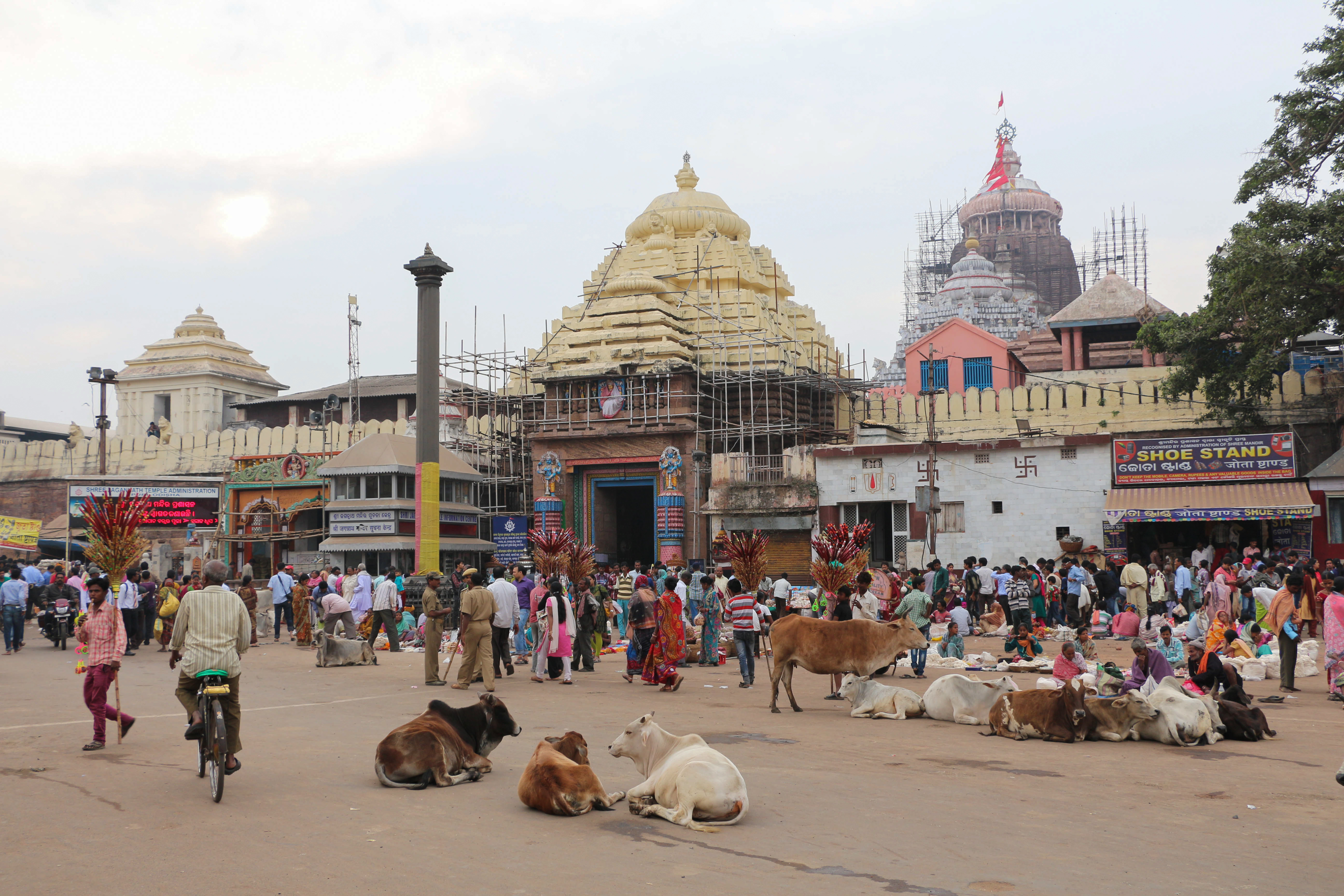
The main entrance of the Jagannath Temple

According to a legend King Indradyumma was directed by Jagannatha in a dream to build a temple for him which he did as directed. However, according to historical records the temple was started some time during the 12th century by King Chodaganga of the Eastern Ganga dynasty. It was completed by his descendant, Anangabhima Deva, in the 12th century. The wooden images of Jagannatha, Balabhadra and Subhadra were then deified here. The temple was under the control of the Hindu rulers up to 1558. Then, when Orissa was occupied by the Afghan Nawab of Bengal, it was brought under the control of the Afghan General Kalapahad. Following the defeat of the Afghan king by Raja Mansingh, the General of Mughal emperor Akbar, the temple became part of the Mughal Empire till 1751. Subsequently, it was under the control of the Marathas till 1803. During the British Raj, the Puri Raja was entrusted with its management until 1947.

The triad of images in the temple are of Jagannatha, personifying Krishna, Balabhadra, His older brother, and Subhadra, His younger sister. The images are made of neem wood in an unfinished form. The stumps of wood which form the images of the brothers have human arms, while that of Subhadra does not have any arms. The heads are large, painted and non-carved. The faces are marked with distinctive large circular eyes.

==== The Pancha Tirtha of Puri ====
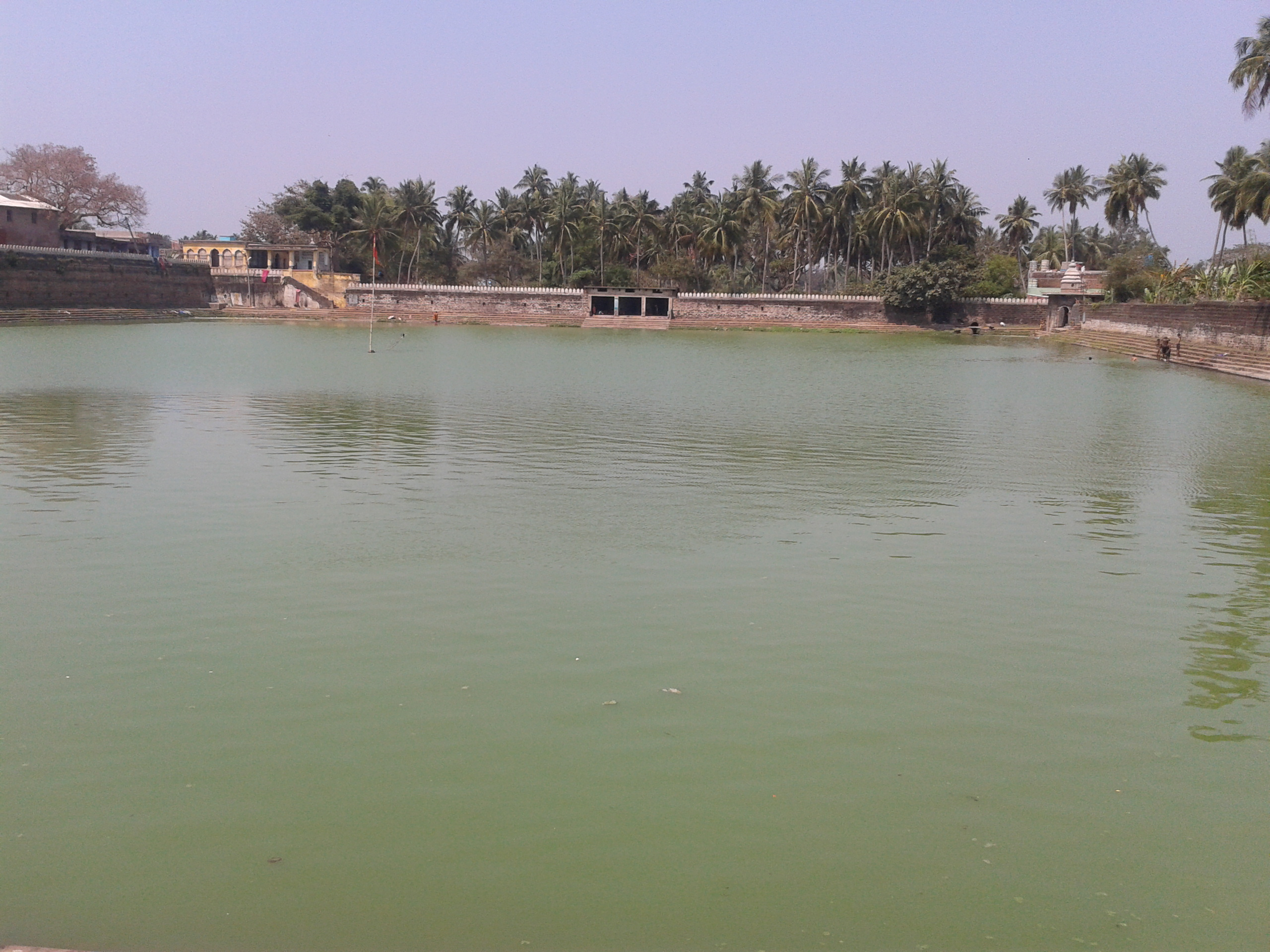
Markandeshwar Tank

Hindus consider it essential to bathe in the Pancha Tirtha or the five sacred bathing spots of Puri, to complete a pilgrimage to Puri. The five sacred water bodies are the Indradyumana Tank, the Rohini Kunda, the Markandeya Tank, the Swetaganga Tank, and the Bay of Bengal also called the Mahodadhi, in Sanskrit 'Mahodadhi' means a "great ocean"; all are considered sacred bathing spots in the Swargadwara area. These tanks have perennial sources of supply from rainfall and ground water.

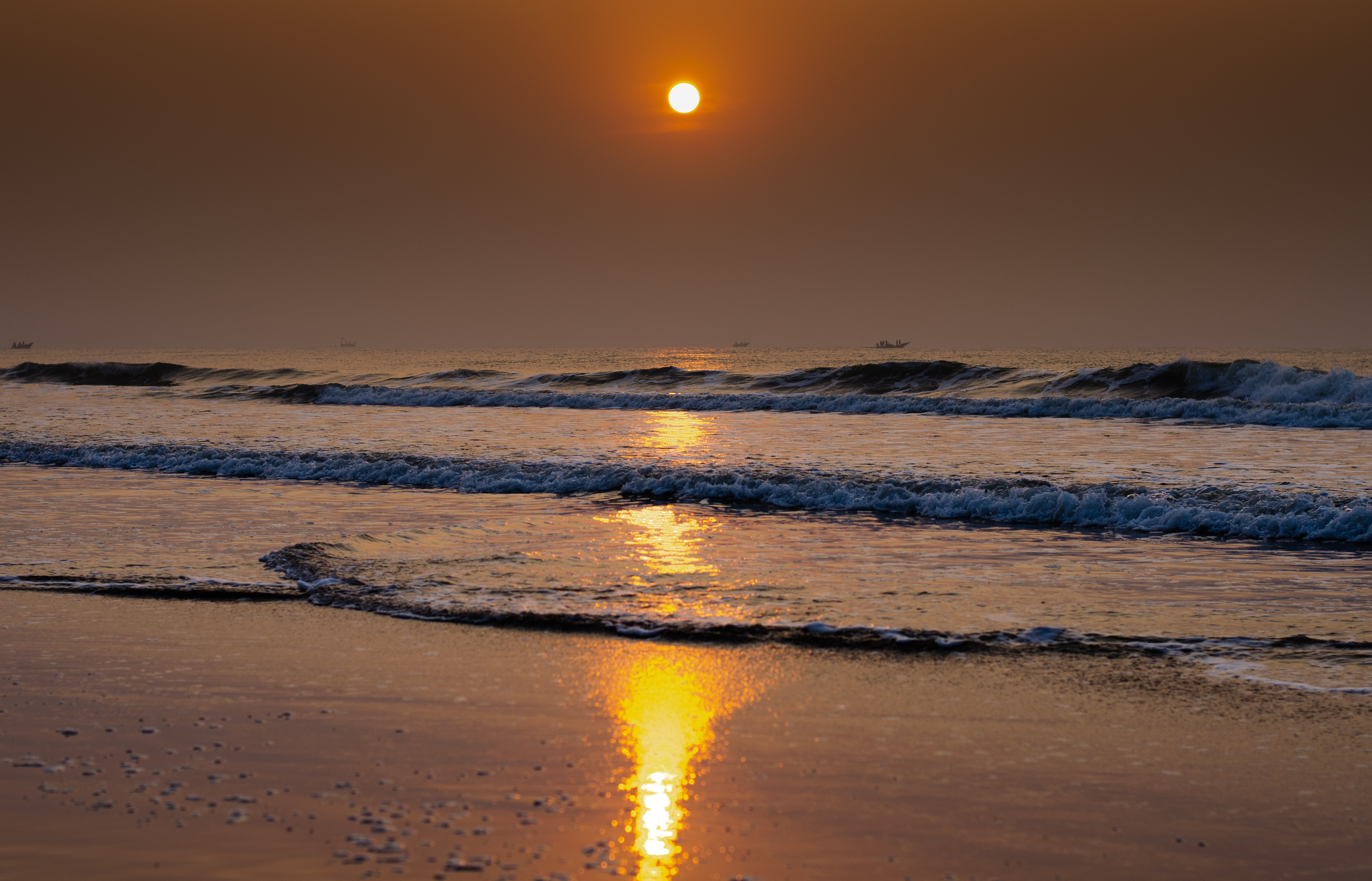
Sunrise at Puri Sea Beach

==== Gundicha Temple ====
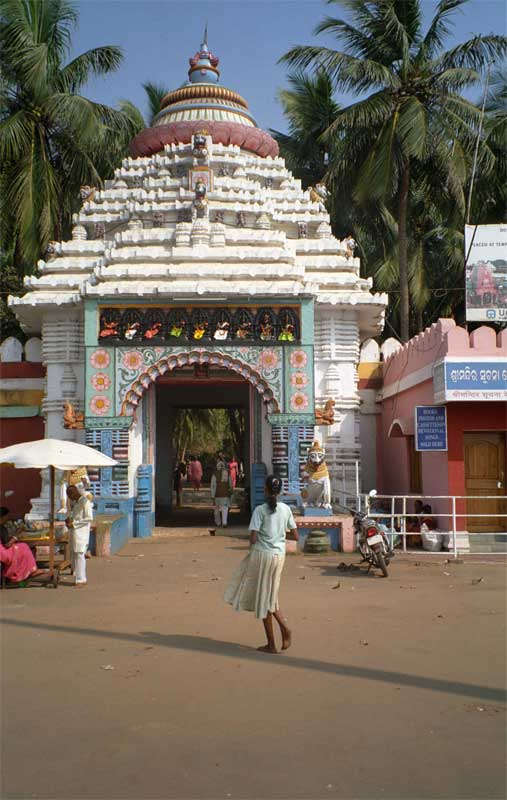
Main entrance of the Gundicha Temple

The Gundicha Temple, known as the Garden House of Jagannatha, stands in the centre of a garden, bounded by compound walls on all sides. It lies at a distance of about 3 kilometres (1.9 mi) to the northeast of the Jagannath Temple. The two temples are located at the two ends of the Bada Danda (Grand Avenue), which is the pathway for the Ratha Yatra. According to a legend, Gundicha was the wife of King Indradyumna who originally built the Jagannath temple.

The temple is built using light-grey sandstone, and, architecturally, it exemplifies typical Kalinga temple architecture in the Deula style. The complex comprises four components: vimana (tower structure containing the sanctum), jagamohana (assembly hall), nata-mandapa (festival hall) and bhoga-mandapa (hall of offerings). There is also a kitchen connected by a small passage. The temple is set within a garden, and is known as "God's Summer Garden Retreat" or garden house of Jagannatha. The entire complex, including the garden, is surrounded by a wall which measures 430 by 320 feet (131 m × 98 m) with height of 20 feet (6.1 m).

Except for the 9-day Ratha Yatra, when the triad images are worshipped in the Gundicha Temple, otherwise it remains unoccupied for the rest of the year. Tourists can visit the temple after paying an entry fee. Foreigners (generally prohibited entry in the main temple) are allowed inside this temple during this period. The temple is under the Jagannath Temple Administration, Puri, the governing body of the main temple. A small band of servitors maintain the temple.

==== Swargadwar ====
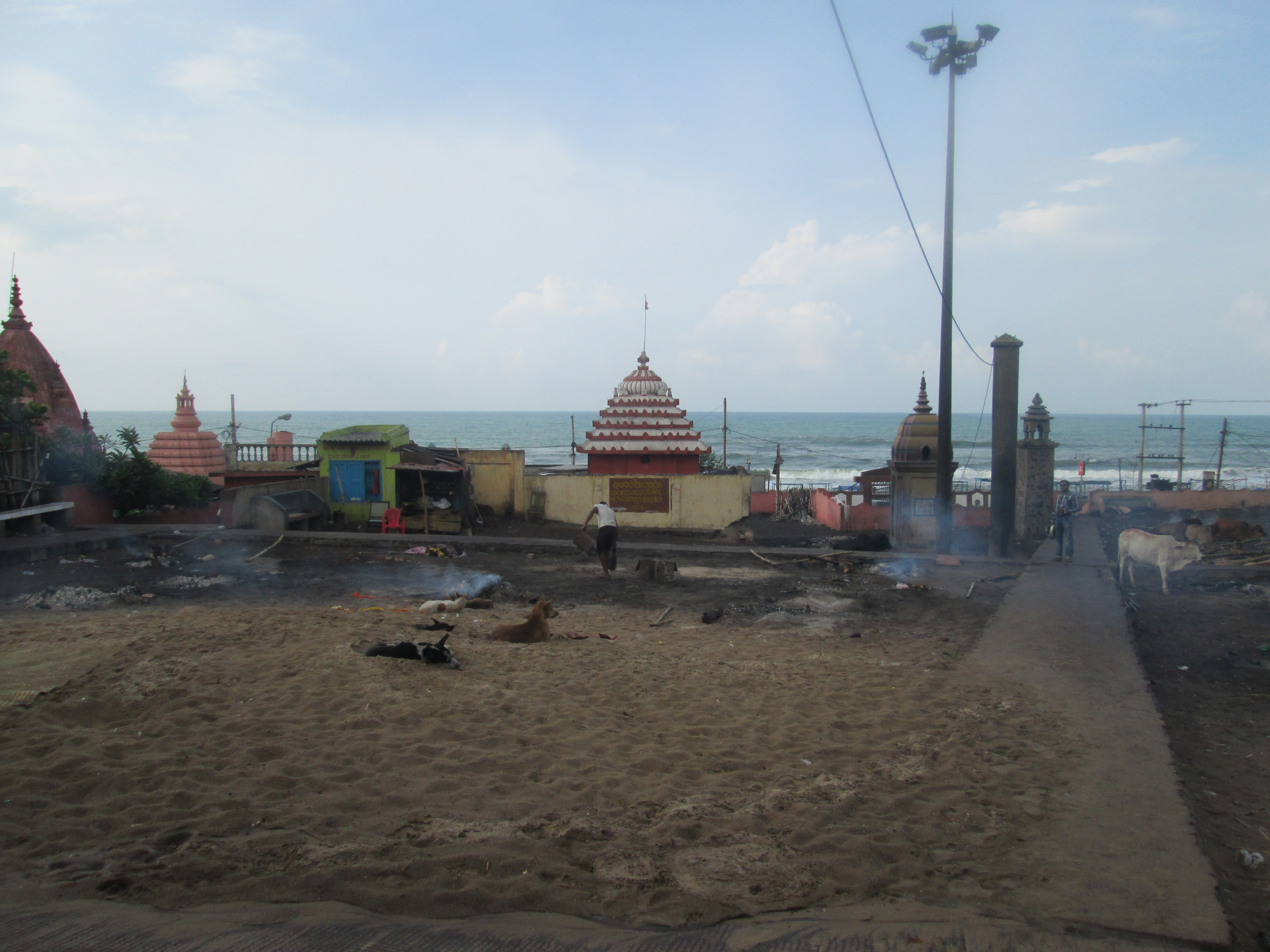
Sea at Swargadwar of Puri

Swargadwar is the name given to the cremation ground or burning ghat which is located on the shores of the sea. Here thousands of dead bodies of Hindus brought from faraway places are cremated. It is a belief that the Chaitanya Mahaparabhu disappeared from this Swargadwar about 500 years back.

==== Beach ====
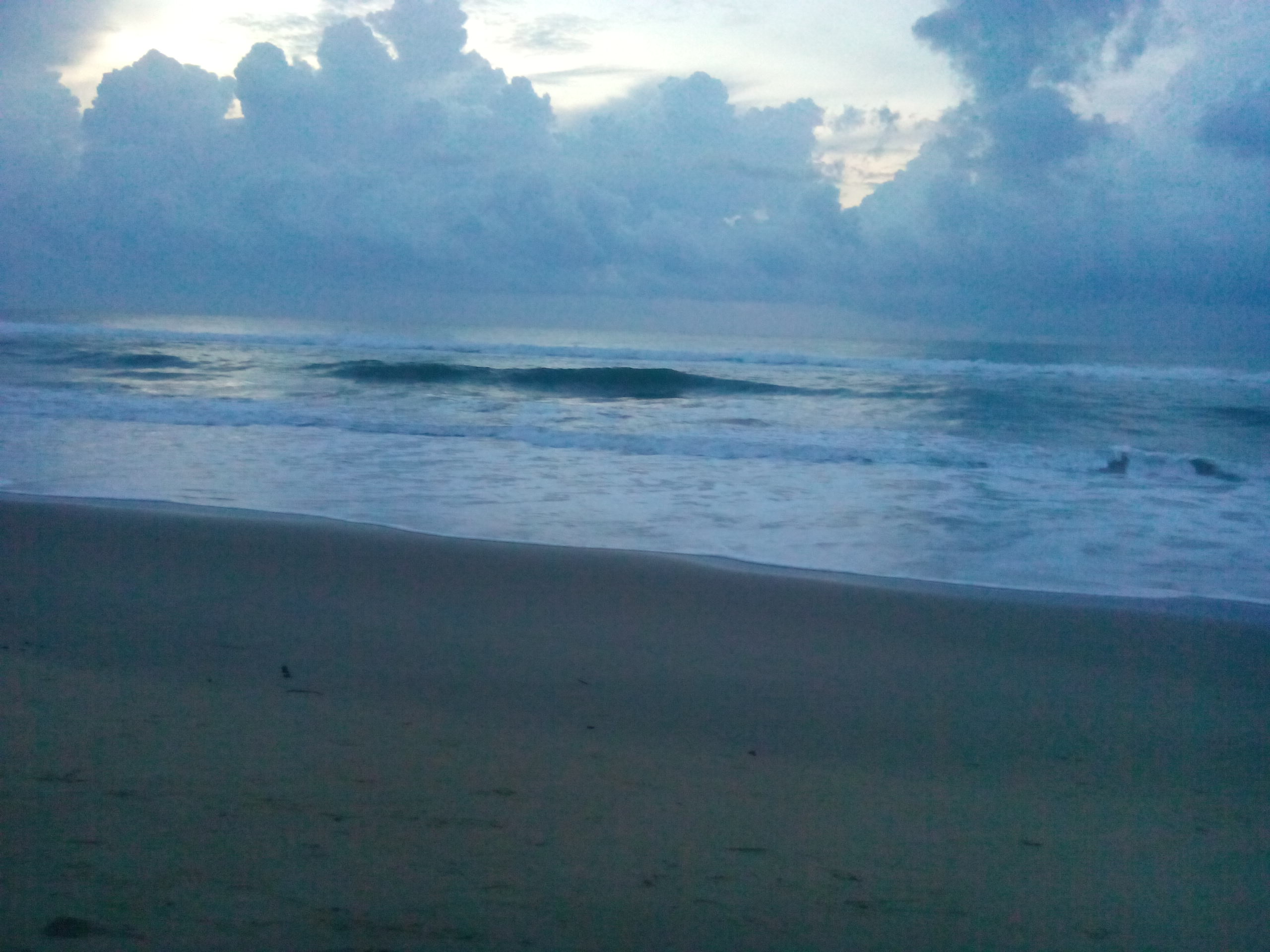
Puri sea sunrise

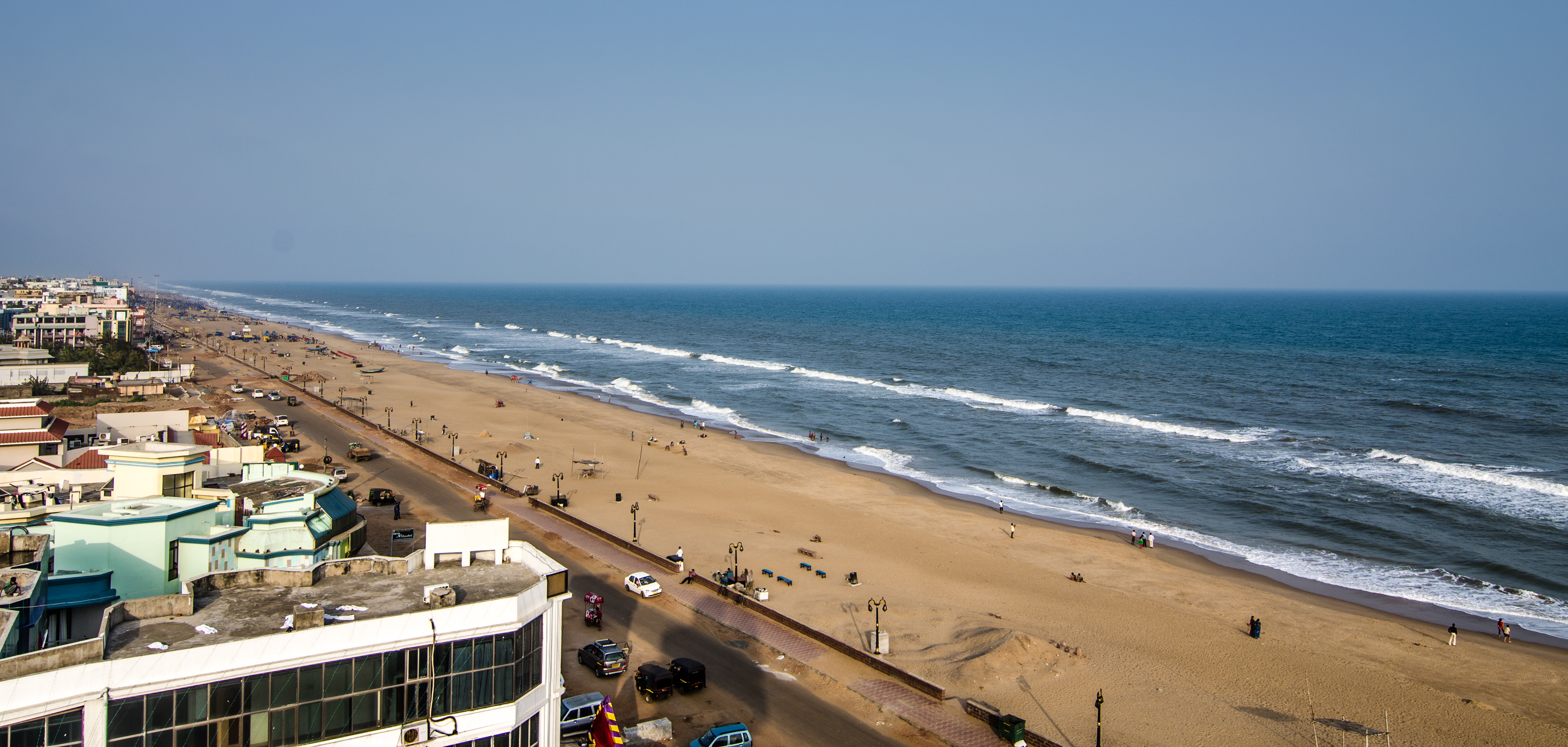
Puri sea beach viewed from the light house

The beach at Puri, known as the "Ballighai beach, at the mouth of Nunai River", is 8 kilometres (5.0 mi) away from the town and is fringed by casurina trees. It has golden yellow sand. Sunrise and sunset are pleasant scenic attractions here. Waves break in at the beach which is long and wide.

==== District museum ====
The Puri district museum is located on the station road where the exhibits in display are the different types of garments worn by Jagannatha, local sculptures, patachitra (traditional, cloth-based scroll painting), ancient Palm-leaf manuscripts, and local craft work.

==== Raghunandana library ====
Raghunandana Library was a library located in the Emara Matha complex (opposite Simhadwara or lion gate, the main entrance gate). The Jagannatha Aitihasika Gavesana Samiti (Jagannatha Historical Centre) is also located here. The library housed ancient palm leaf manuscripts on Jagannatha, his cult and the history of the city. The Raghunandana Library is now defunct, destroyed along with the centuries-old Embar Mutt in 2021, deemed as an encroaching element in the Shree Jagannath Heritage Corridor project. Its collections were taken out from the Mutt possession in 2019 and are now displaced to the Puri collectorate office.

=== Festivals of Puri ===
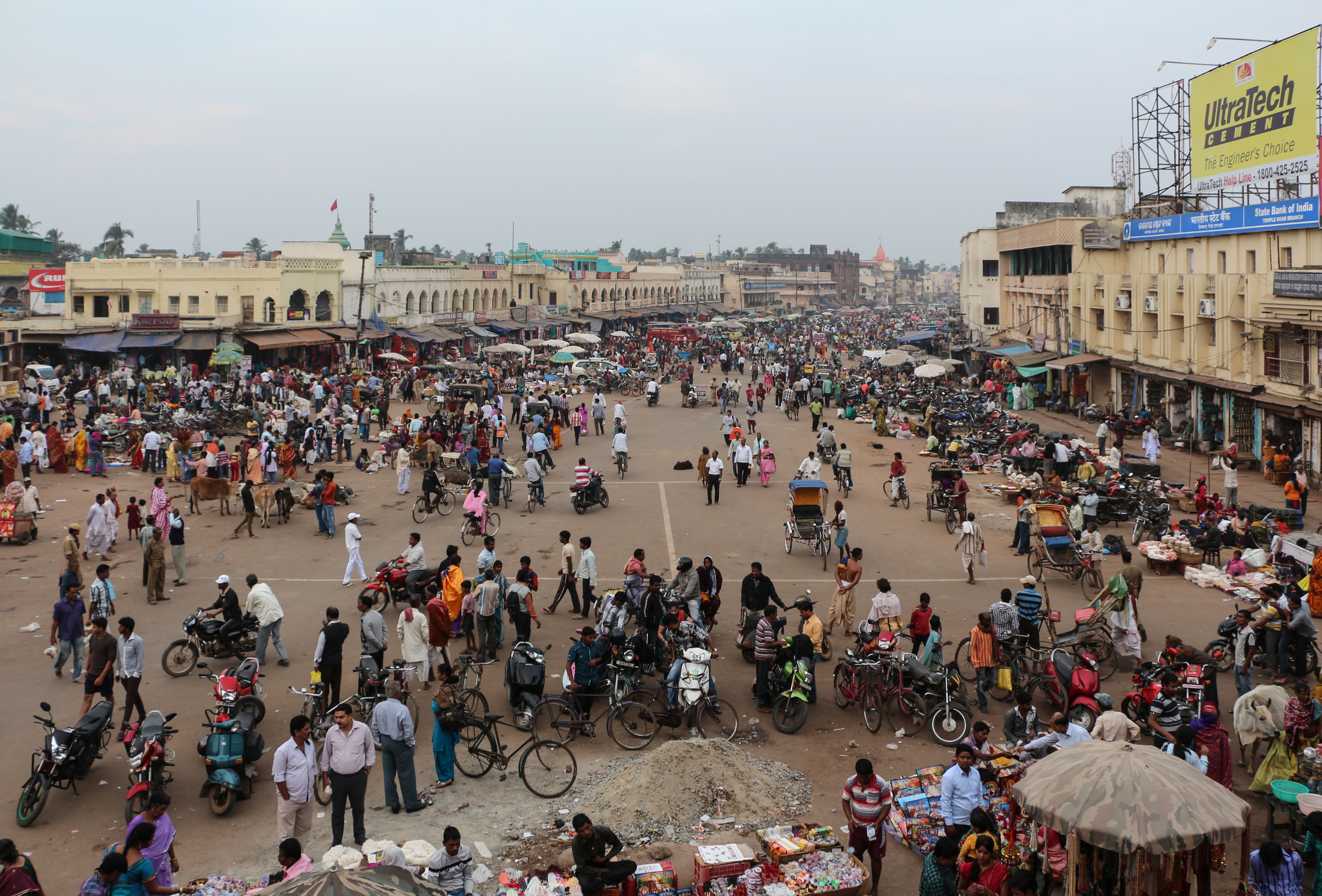
The Grand Road near the Jagannath Temple

Puri witnesses 24 festivals every year, of which 13 are major. The most important of these is the Ratha Yatra, or the car festival, held in the June–July, which is attended by more than 1 million people.

==== Ratha Yatra at Puri ====
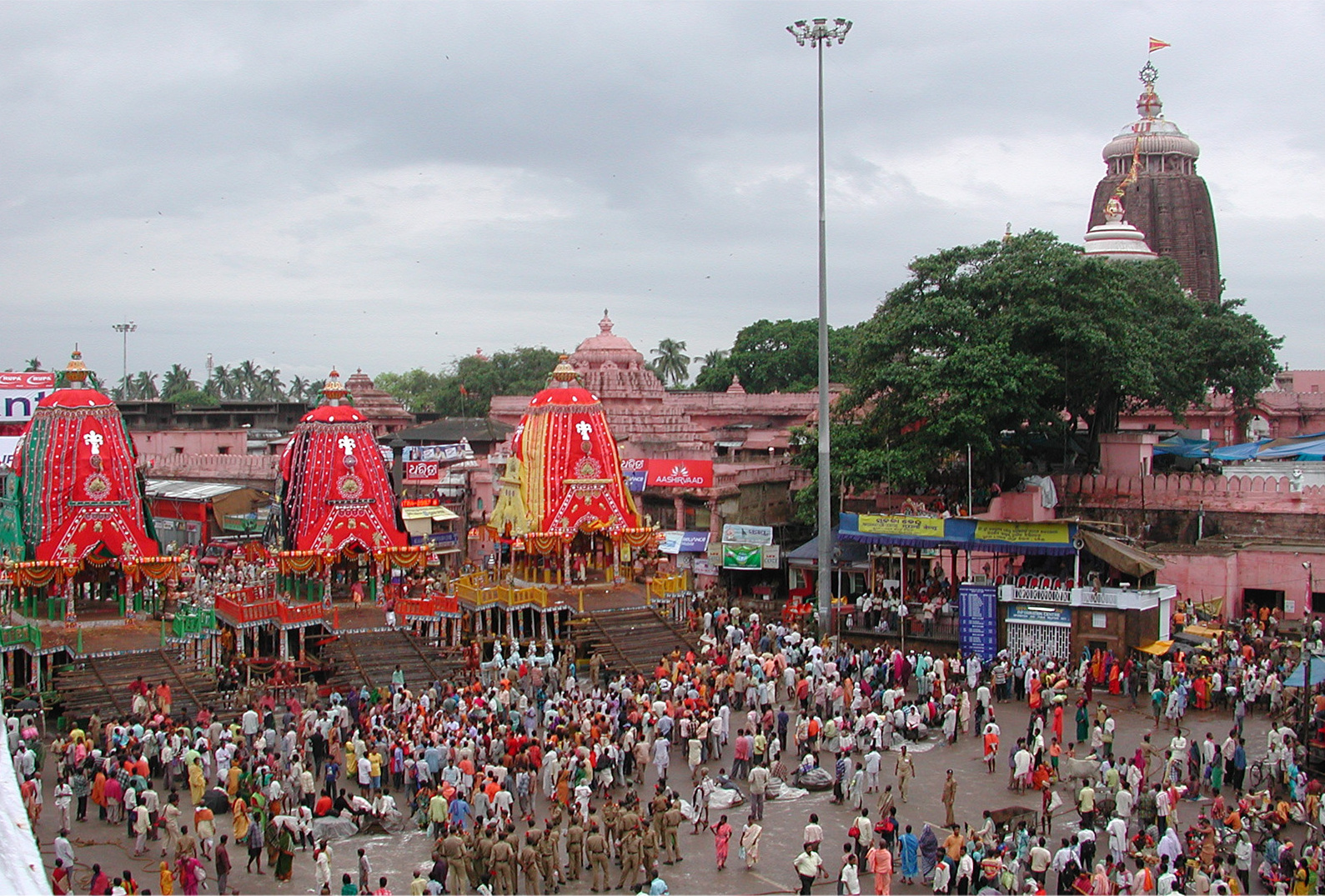
The Ratha Yatra in Puri in modern times showing the three chariots of the deities with the Temple in the background

The Jagannath Temple triad are normally worshipped in the sanctum of the temple at Puri, but once during the month of Asadha (rainy season of Orissa, usually in June or July), they are brought out on the Bada Danda (main street of Puri) and taken over a distance of (3 kilometres (1.9 mi)) to the Gundicha Temple in huge chariots (ratha), allowing the public to have darśana (holy view). This festival is known as the Ratha Yatra, meaning the journey (yatra) of the chariots. The yatra starts every year according to the Hindu calendar on the Asadha Sukla Dwitiya day, the second day of bright fortnight of Asadha (June–July).

Historically, the ruling Ganga dynasty instituted the Ratha Yatra on the completion of the Jagannath Temple around 1150 AD. This festival was one of those Hindu festivals that was reported to the Western world very early. Friar Odoric, in his account of 1321, reported how the people put the "idols" on chariots, and the King, the Queen and all the people drew them from the "church" with song and music.

The Rathas are huge wooden structures provided with large wheels, which are built anew every year and are pulled by the devotees. The chariot for Jagannatha is about 45 feet (14 m) high and 35 square feet (3.3 m^{2}) and takes about 2 months for its construction. The chariot is mounted with 16 wheels, each of 7 feet (2.1 m) diameter. The carving in the front face of the chariot has four wooden horses drawn by Maruti. On its other three faces, the wooden carvings are of Rama, Surya and Vishnu. The chariot is known as Nandi Ghosha. The roof of the chariot is covered with yellow and red coloured cloth. The next chariot is of Balabhadra which is 44 feet (13 m) in height fitted with 14 wheels. The chariot is carved with Satyaki as the charioteer, roof covered in red and green coloured cloth, and the chariot is known as Taladhwaja. The carvings on this chariot include images of Narasimha and Rudra as Jagannatha's companions. The next chariot in the order is of Subhadra, which is 43 feet (13 m) in height supported on 12 wheels, roof covered in black and red colour cloth, and the chariot is known as Darpa Dalaan and the charioteer carved is Arjuna. Other images carved on the chariot are of Vana Durga, Tara Devi and Chandi Devi. The artists and painters of Puri decorate the cars and paint flower petals and other designs on the wheels, the wood-carved charioteer and horses, and the inverted lotuses on the wall behind the throne. The chariots of Jagannatha pulled during Ratha Yatra is the etymological origin of the English word Juggernaut. The Ratha Yatra is also termed as the Shri Gundicha yatra and Ghosha yatra

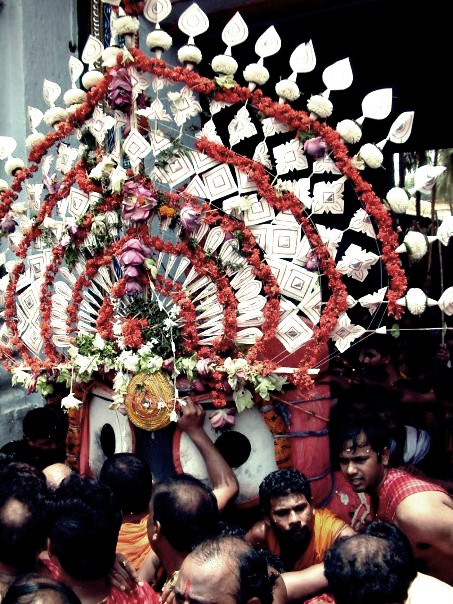
Pahandi bije during Ratha Yatra at Puri

==== Chhera Panhara ====
The Chhera Panhara (sweeping with water) is a significant ritual associated with the Ratha Yatra. During this ritual, the Gajapati King wears the outfit of a sweeper and sweeps all around the deities and chariots. The king cleans the road in front of the chariots with a gold-handled broom and sprinkles sandalwood water and powder. As per the custom, although the Gajapati King has been considered the most exalted person in the Kalingan kingdom, he still renders the menial service to Jagannatha. This ritual signifies that under the lordship of Jagannatha, there is no distinction between the powerful sovereign and the humblest devotee.

==== Chandan Yatra ====
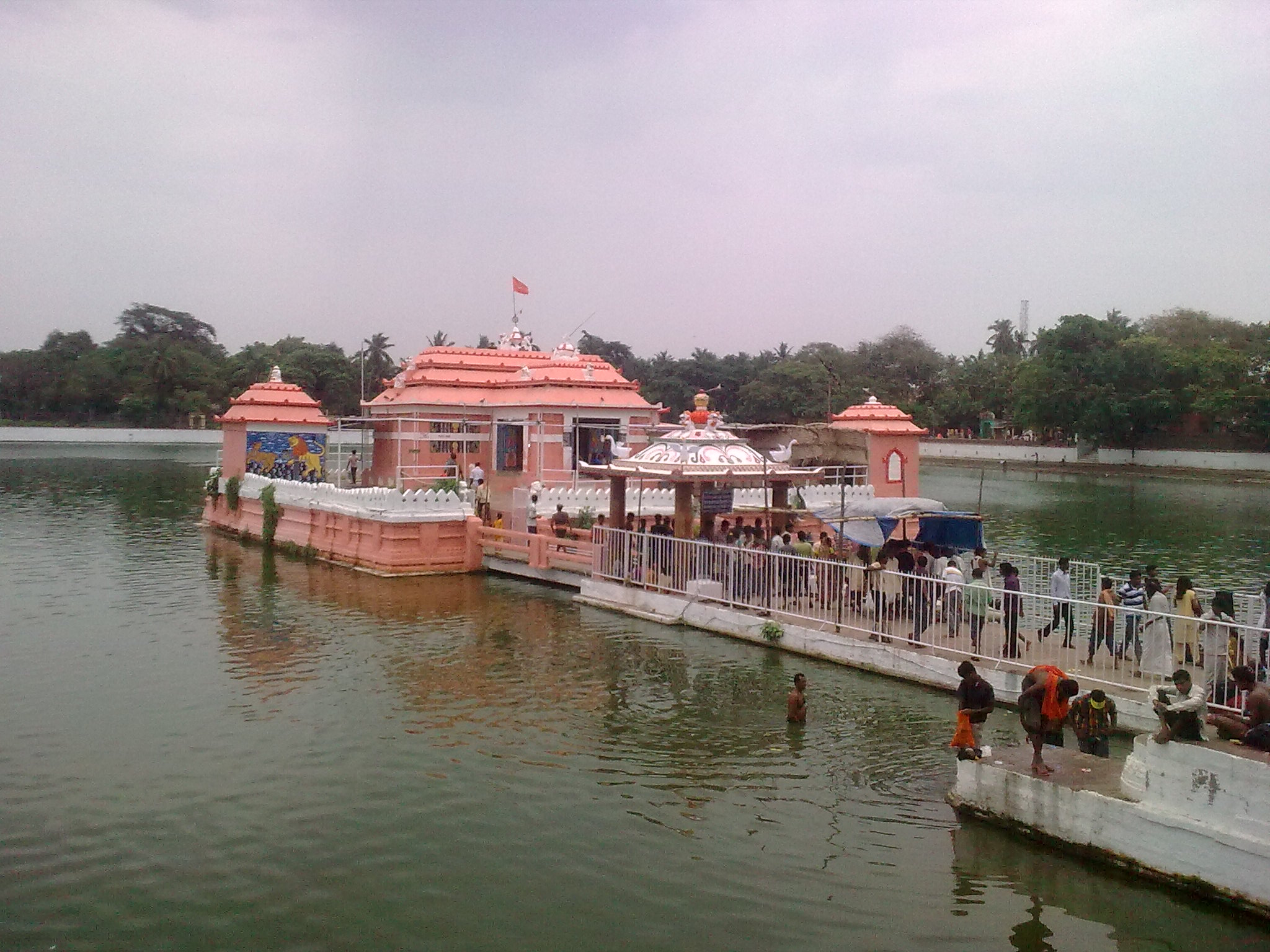
The Narendra Tirtha tank where ceremonies of Chandan Yatra are performed

The Chandan Yatra festival held every year on Akshaya Tritiya day marks the commencement of the construction of the chariots of the Ratha Yatra. It also marks the celebration of the Hindu new year.

==== Snana Yatra ====
Every year, on the Purnima day in the Hindu calendar month of Jyestha (June), the triad images of the Jagannath Temple are ceremonially bathed and decorated on the occasion of Snana Yatra. Water for the bath is taken in 108 pots from the Suna kuan (meaning: "golden well") located near the northern gate of the temple. Water is drawn from this well only once in a year for the sole purpose of the religious bath of the deities. After the bath the triad images are dressed in the fashion of the elephant god, Ganesha. Later, during the night, the original triad images are taken out in a procession back to the main temple but kept at a place known as Anasara pindi. After this the Jhulan Yatra is performed when proxy images of the deities are taken out in a grand procession for 21 days, cruised over boats in the Narendra Tirtha tank.

==== Anavasara or Anasara ====
Anasara, a derivative of the Sanskrit word "Anavasara", literally means vacation. Every year after the holy Snana Yatra, the triad images, without the Sudarshana Chakra, are taken to a secret altar named Anavasara Ghar (also known as Anasara pindi, 'pindi' is Oriya term meaning "platform") where they remain for the next fortnight of (Krishna paksha); devotees are not allowed to view these images. Instead, devotees go to the nearby Brahmagiri to see the Lord in the four-handed form of Alarnath, a depiction of Vishnu. Devotees then get the first glimpse of the Lord only on the day before Ratha Yatra, which is called Navayouvana. It is a local belief that the gods suffer from fever after taking an elaborate ritual bath, and they are treated by the special servants, the Daitapatis, for 15 days. Daitapatis perform special nitis (rites) known as Netrotchhaba (a rite of painting the eyes of the triad). During this period cooked food is not offered to the deities.

==== Naba Kalebara ====
Naba Kalebara is one of the most grand events associated with the LJagannatha that takes place when one lunar month of Ashadha is followed by another of Ashadha called Adhika Masa (extra month). This can take place at an interval of 8, 12 or even 18 years. Literally meaning the "New Body" (Nava = New, Kalevar = Body) in Odia, the festival is witnessed by millions of people and the budget for this event generally exceeds $500,000. The event involves installation of new images in the temple and burial of the old ones in the temple premises at Koili Vaikuntha. During the Nabakalebara ceremony held during July 2015 the idols that were installed in the temple in 1996 were replaced by specially carved new images made of neem wood. More than 3 million people are reported to have attended this festival.

==== Suna Besha ====
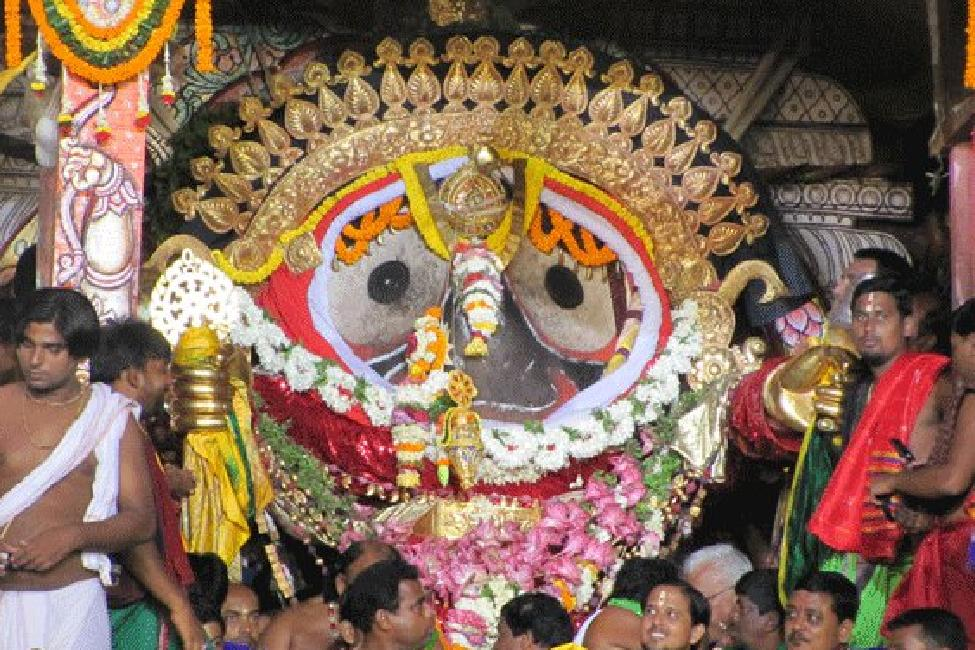
Suna Besha or Golden Attire of Lord Jagannatha

Suna Besha, ('Suna besh'in English translates to "gold dressing") also known as Raja or Rajadhiraja Bhesha or Raja Bhesha, is an event when the triad images of the Jagannath Temple are adorned with gold jewellery. This event is observed five times in a year. It is commonly observed on Magha Purnima (January), Bahuda Ekadashi also known as Asadha Ekadashi (July), Dashahara (Bijayadashami) (October), Karthik Purnima (November), and Pousa Purnima (December). One such Suna Bhesha event is observed on Bahuda Ekadashi during the Ratha Yatra on the chariots placed at the Simhadwar. The other four Beshas are observed inside the temple on the Ratna Singhasana (gem studded altar). On this occasion gold plates are decorated over the hands and feet of Jagannatha and Balabhadra; Jagannatha is also adorned with a Chakra (disc) made of gold on the right hand while a silver conch adorns the left hand. Balabhadra is decorated with a plough made of gold on the left hand while a golden mace adorns his right hand.

==== Niladri Bije ====
Niladri Bije, celebrated in the Hindu calendar month Asadha (June–July) on Trayodashi (13th day), marks the end of the Ratha Yatra. The large wooden images of the triad of gods are taken out from the chariots and then carried to the sanctum sanctorum, swaying rhythmically; a ritual which is known as pahandi.

==== Sahi yatra ====
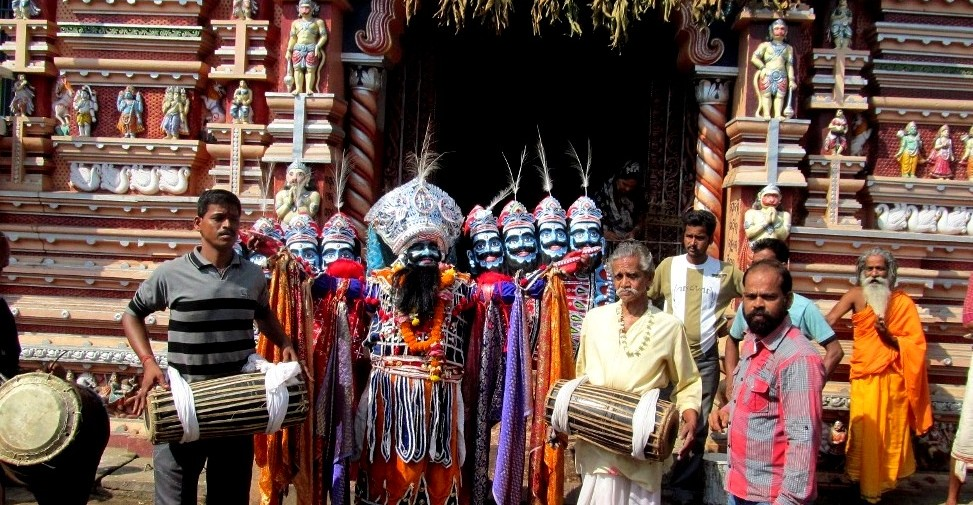
A scene from a play being enacted during the Sahi Yatra

The Sahi Yatra, considered the world's biggest open-air theatre, is an annual event lasting 11 days; a traditional cultural theatre festival or folk drama which begins on Ram Navami and ends on Rama avishke (Sanskrit meaning : anointing). The festival includes plays depicting various scenes from the Ramayana. The residents of various localities, or Sahis, are entrusted the task of performing the drama at the street corners.

==== Samudra Arati ====
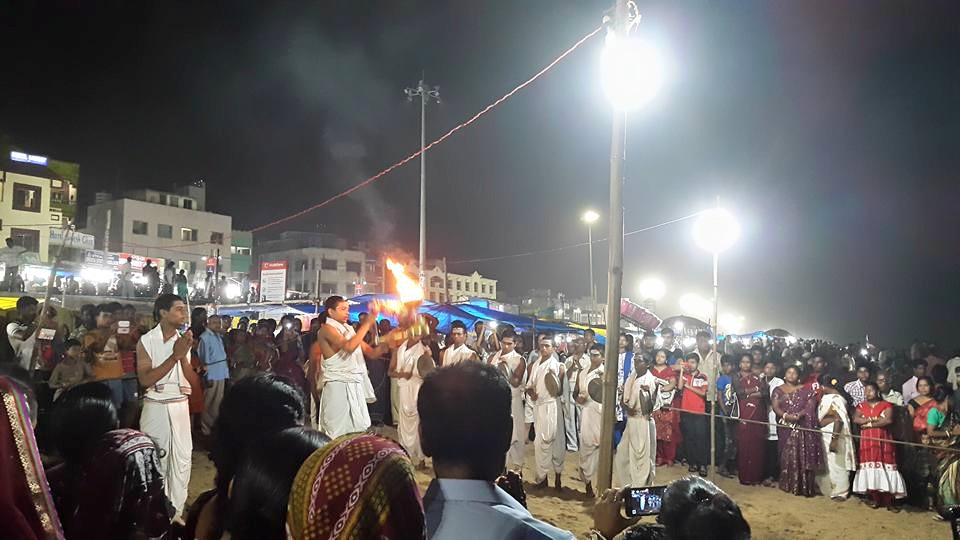
Samudra arati of worship of the sea by disciples of the Matha at Puri

The Samudra arati is a daily tradition started by the present Shankaracharya 9 years ago. The daily practise includes prayer and fire offering to the sea at Swargadwar in Puri by disciples of the Govardhan Matha. On Paush Purnima of every year the Shankaracharya himself comes out to offer prayers to the sea.

=== Arts and crafts ===
==== Sand art ====
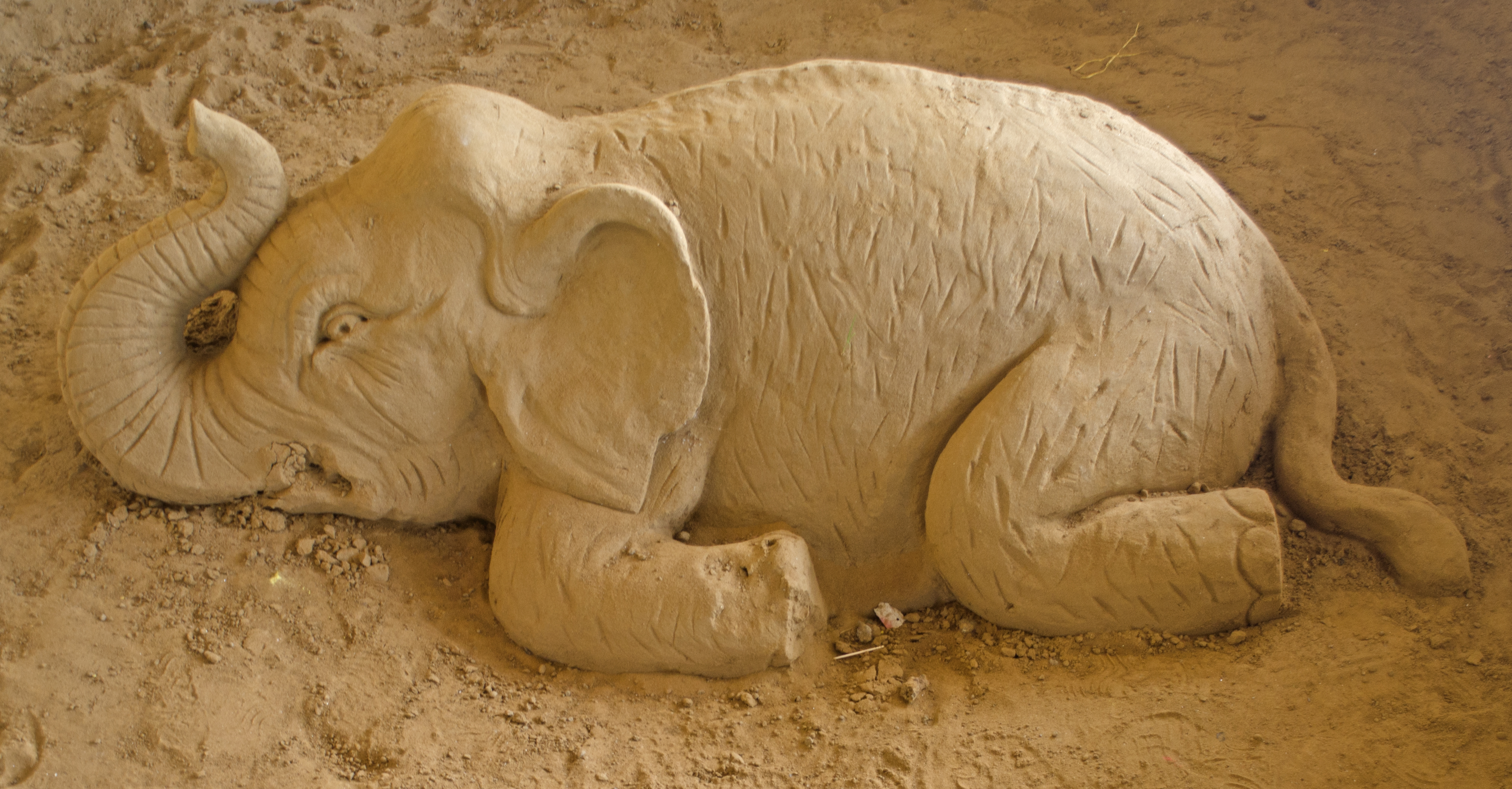
Sand art of a baby elephant

Sand art is a special art form that is created on the beaches of Puri. The art form is attributed to Balaram Das, a poet who lived in the 14th century. Sculptures of various gods and famous people are now created in sand by amateur artists. These are temporary in nature as they get washed away by waves. This art form has gained international fame in recent years. One of the famed sand artists of Odisha is Sudarshan Patnaik. He established the Golden Sand Art Institute in 1995, in the open air on the shores of Bay of Bengal, to provide training to students interested in this art form.

==== Appliqué art ====
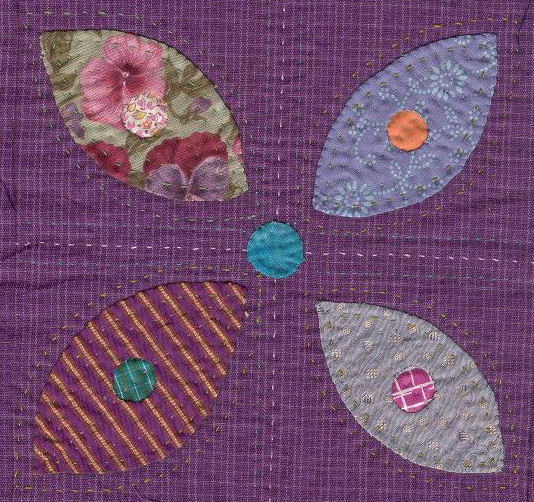
An applique art work

Appliqué art, which is a stitching-based craft unlike embroidery, has been pioneered by the people of Pipili. It is widely used in Puri, both for decoration of the deities and for sale. The members of the Suchika caste were employed as darjis (tailors) or sebaks by the Maharaja of Puri. They prepared articles for decorating the deities in the temple for various festivals and religious ceremonies. The appliqué works are brightly coloured and patterned fabric in the form of canopies, umbrellas, drapery, carry bags, flags, coverings of dummy horses and cows, and other household textiles; these are marketed in Puri. The cloth used is made in dark colours of red, black, yellow, green, blue and turquoise blue.

==== Pattachitra ====
Pattachitra, one of the oldest forms of cloth-based scroll painting of the region, originally created for ritual use and as souvenirs for pilgrims to Puri, as well as other temples in Odisha.

=== Cultural activities ===
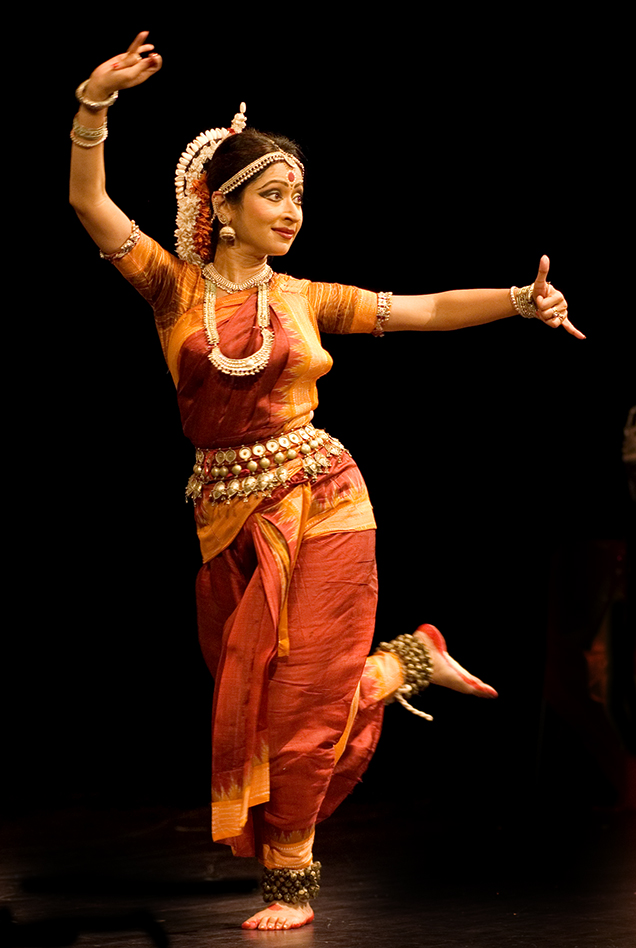
Odissi dancer

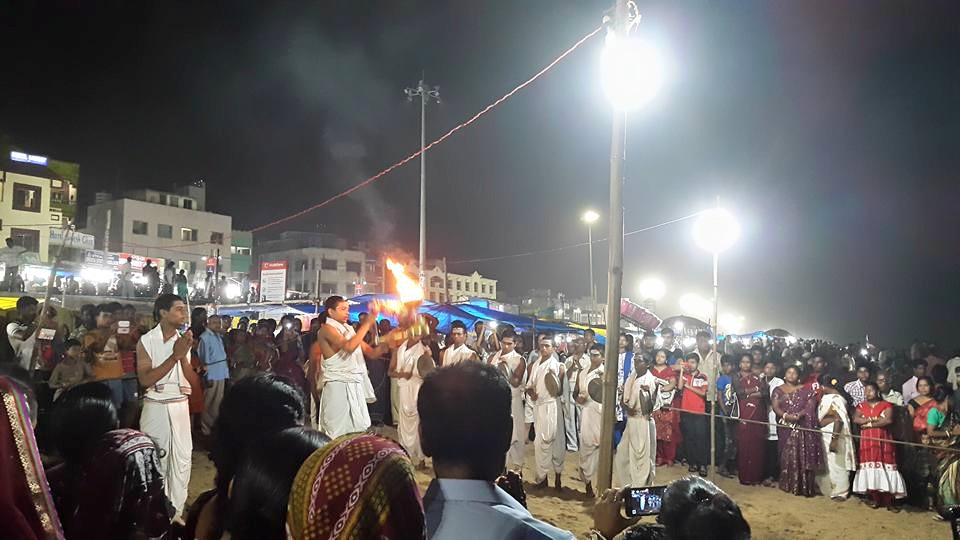
Samudra arati or worship of the sea at Swargadwar by disciples of the Govardhana matha

Cultural activities, including the annual religious festivals, in Puri are: The Puri Beach Festival held from 5 to 9 November every year, and the Shreekshetra Utsav held from 20 December to 2 January every year. The cultural programs include unique sand art, display of local and traditional handicrafts and food festival. In addition, cultural programs are held for two hours on every second Saturday of the month at the district Collector's Conference Hall near Sea Beach Police Station. Odissi dance, Odissi music and folk dances are part of this event. Odissi dance is the cultural heritage of Puri. This dance form originated in Puri from the dances performed by Devadasis (Maharis) attached to the Jagannath Temple who performed dances in the Nata mandapa of the temple to please the deities. Though the devadasi practice has been discontinued, the dance form has become modern and classical and is widely popular; many of the Odissi virtuoso artists and gurus (teachers) are from Puri. Some of the notable Odissi dancers are Kelucharan Mohapatra, Mayadhar Raut, Sonal Mansingh, and Sanjukta Panigrahi.

== Transport ==
=== Road ===
Earlier, when roads did not exist, people used to walk or travel by animal-drawn vehicles or carriages along beaten tracks to reach Puri. Travel was by riverine craft along the Ganges up to Calcutta, and then on foot or by carriages. It was only during the Maratha rule that the Jagannath Sadak (Road) was built around 1790. The East India Company laid the rail track from Calcutta to Puri, which became operational in 1898. Puri is now well-connected by rail, road and air services.

=== Train ===
A broad gauge railway line of the South Eastern Railways which connects Puri with Kolkata and Khorda Road is an important railway junction on this route. The rail distance is 499 kilometres (310 mi) from Kolkata and 468 kilometres (291 mi) from Vishakhapatnam. Road network includes NH 203 that links the city with Bhubaneswar, the state capital, situated about 60 kilometres (37 mi) away. NH 203 B connects the city with Satapada via Brahmagiri. Marine drive, which is part of NH 203 A, connects Puri with Konark. Puri railway station is among the top hundred booking stations of the Indian Railways. Puri railway station is 1,321 kilometres (821 mi) away from New Delhi.

=== Air ===
A proposal was received from the State Government of Odisha for development of a Greenfield Airport at Puri to the Ministry of Civil Aviation seeking 'Site Clearance' approval under GFA Policy.

Shree Jagannath International Airport is likely to be operational by 2029.

== Education ==
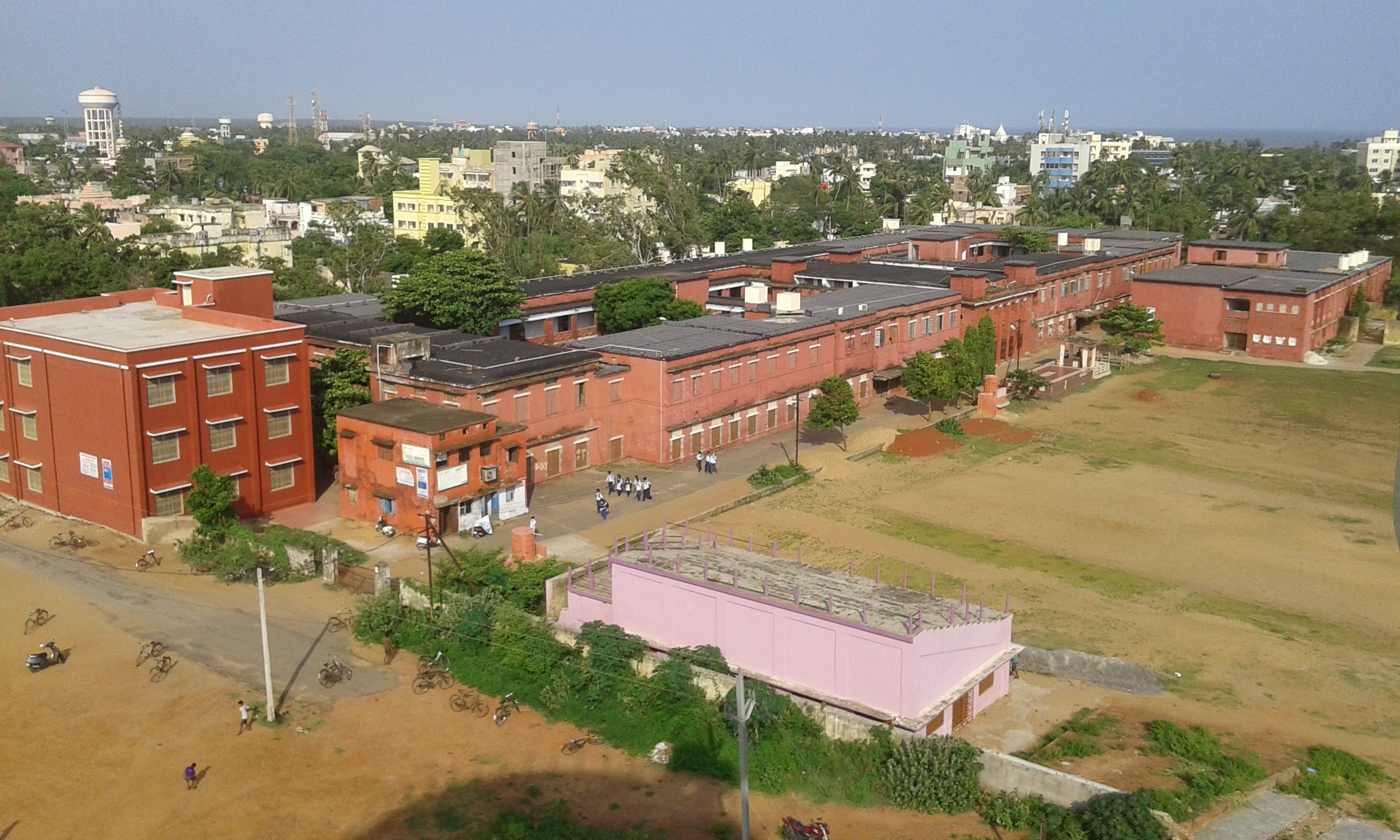
Samanta Chandra Sekhara College, Puri

=== Schools ===
- D.A.V Public School, Puri
- Kendriya Vidyalaya, Puri
- Puri Zilla School

=== Colleges and Universities ===
- Central Sanskrit University, Shri Sadashiv Campus
- Ghanashyama Hemalata Institute of Technology and Management
- Shree Jagannath Sanskrit University
- Sri Jagannath Medical College and Hospital

== Notable people ==
- Bidhu Bhusan Das - Academic and Vice-Chancellor, DPI Odisha
- Gopabandhu Das – Social worker
- Nilakantha Das – Social activist
- Pankaj Charan Das – Odissi dancer
- Prabhat Nalini Das - pro Vice-Chancellor, academician, feminist, Dean IIT Kanpur
- Gajapati Maharaja Dibyasingha Deb - Odia King
- Charles Garrett – Cricketer
- Chakhi Khuntia – Freedom fighter
- Mayadhar Mansingh - Odia poet and writer
- Pinaki Misra - Politician
- Kelucharan Mohapatra – Odissi dancer
- Raghunath Mohapatra – Architect and sculptor
- Baisali Mohanty - ALC Global Fellow at University of Oxford, United Kingdom
- Rituraj Mohanty – Singer
- Sarat Kumar Mukhopadhyay - Poet, novelist
- Sudarshan Pattnaik – Sand Artist
- Jayee Rajguru - Freedom fighter
- Madhusudan Rao – Odia Poet
- Bhaktisiddhanta Sarasvati - spiritual master and founder of Gaudiya Math
- Sudarshan Sahoo - Sculptor

== See also ==
- Chari Kshetra
- Konark Dance Festival

== Bibliography ==
- Ananda, Sri G. (2015). Empires of the Vedas Volume IV: The Kingdom of God. Art of Unity. ISBN 978-1-5078-9942-7.
- Bansal, Sunita Pant (1 April 2012). HIndu Pilgrimage: A journey through the holy places of hindus all over India. V&S Publishers. ISBN 978-93-5057-251-1.
- Das, Manoranjan (1982). The wooden horse: drama. Bookland International.
- Dash, Abhimanyu (July 2011). "Invasions on the Temple of Lord Jagannath, Puri" (PDF). Government of Odisha. Archived from the original (PDF) on 29 March 2017.
- Bindloss, Joe; Brown, Lindsay; Elliott, Mark; Harding, Paul (2007). Northeast India. Lonely Planet. ISBN 978-1-74179-095-5.
- Davis, Roy Eugene (1 January 1997). Life Surrendered in God: The Philosophy and Practices of Kriya Yoga. Motilal Banarsidass. ISBN 978-81-208-1495-0.
- Jones, Constance; Ryan, James D. (2006). Encyclopedia of Hinduism. Infobase Publishing. ISBN 978-0-8160-7564-5.
- Kapoor, Subodh (2002). The Indian Encyclopaedia. Cosmo Publications. ISBN 978-81-7755-257-7.
- Madan, T. N (1 January 1988). Way of Life: King, Householder, Renouncer : Essays in Honour of Louis Dumont. Motilal Banarsidass. ISBN 978-81-208-0527-9.
- Managers, City (2006). "Puri City DevelopmentPlan 2006" (PDF). Puri Municipality:Government of Odisha. Archived from the original (PDF) on 5 March 2016.
- Mahanti, J C (2014). The Saga of Jagannatha and Badadeula at Puri (: Story of Lord Jagannatha and his Temple). Vij Books India Pvt Ltd. ISBN 978-93-82652-45-8.
- Mohapatra, J (24 December 2013). Wellness In Indian Festivals & Rituals: Since the Supreme Divine is manifested in all the Gods, worship of any God is quite legitimate. Partridge Publishing. ISBN 978-1-4828-1689-1.
- Naik, Shailaja D. (1 January 1996). Traditional Embroideries of India. APH Publishing. ISBN 978-81-7024-731-9.
- Ring, Trudy; Salkin, Robert M.; Boda, Sharon La (1994). International Dictionary of Historic Places: Asia and Oceania. Taylor & Francis. ISBN 978-1-884964-04-6.
- Sadasivan, S. N. (1 January 2000). A Social History of India. APH Publishing. ISBN 978-81-7648-170-0.
- Sen, Colleen Taylor (2004). Food Culture in India. Greenwood Publishing Group. ISBN 0-313-32487-5.
- Starza, O. M. (1993). The Jagannatha Temple at Puri: Its Architecture, Art, and Cult. BRILL. ISBN 90-04-09673-6.
