= Swargadwara =

Sacred cremation ground

Swargadwara (Odia: ସ୍ୱର୍ଗ ଦ୍ୱାର; lit. 'Gateway to Heaven') is a cremation ground considered one of India's most auspicious mortuary sites. It is located at on the shore of Bay of Bengal (called Mahodadhi), about a mile to the south of Jagannath Temple and southeastern area of the city Puri in Odisha. Generally the Hindus believe that, by cremation in Swargadwara, they will go to heaven for liberating their soul and will attain ultimate salvation.

Kapila Samhita said that the Swargadwara one of a seven sacred places from the list, where Brahma was embodied from Heaven on earth with Indradyumna for consecrating the holy Trinity.
