= Cuttack =

City in Odisha, India

Cuttack Kaṭaka (Odia)
- City
- Kataka
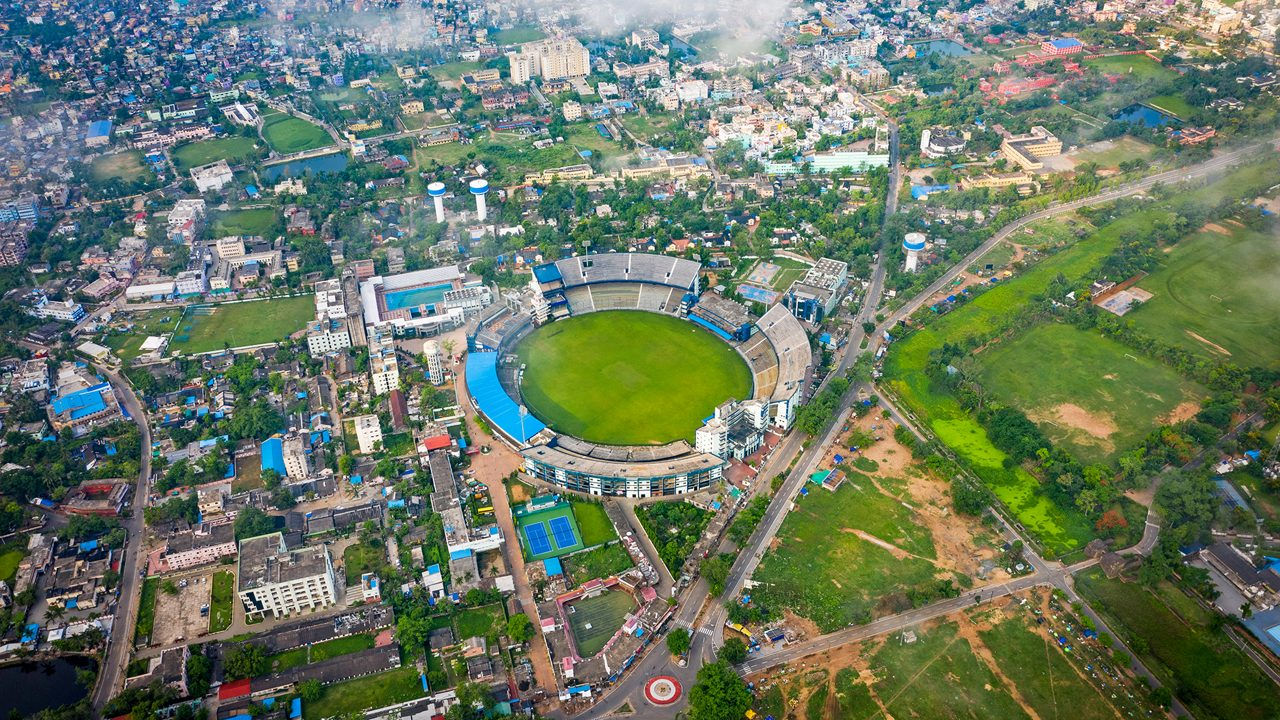
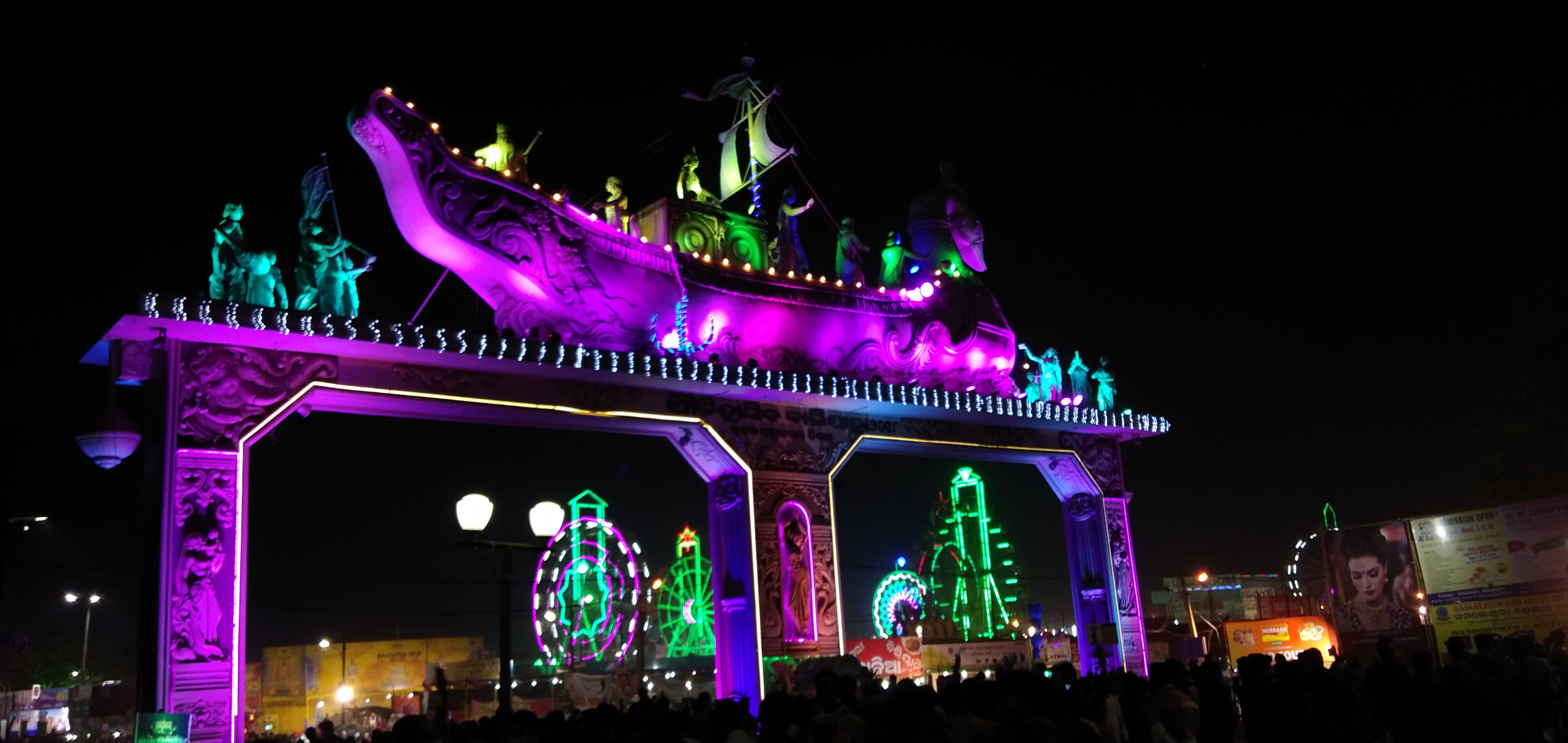
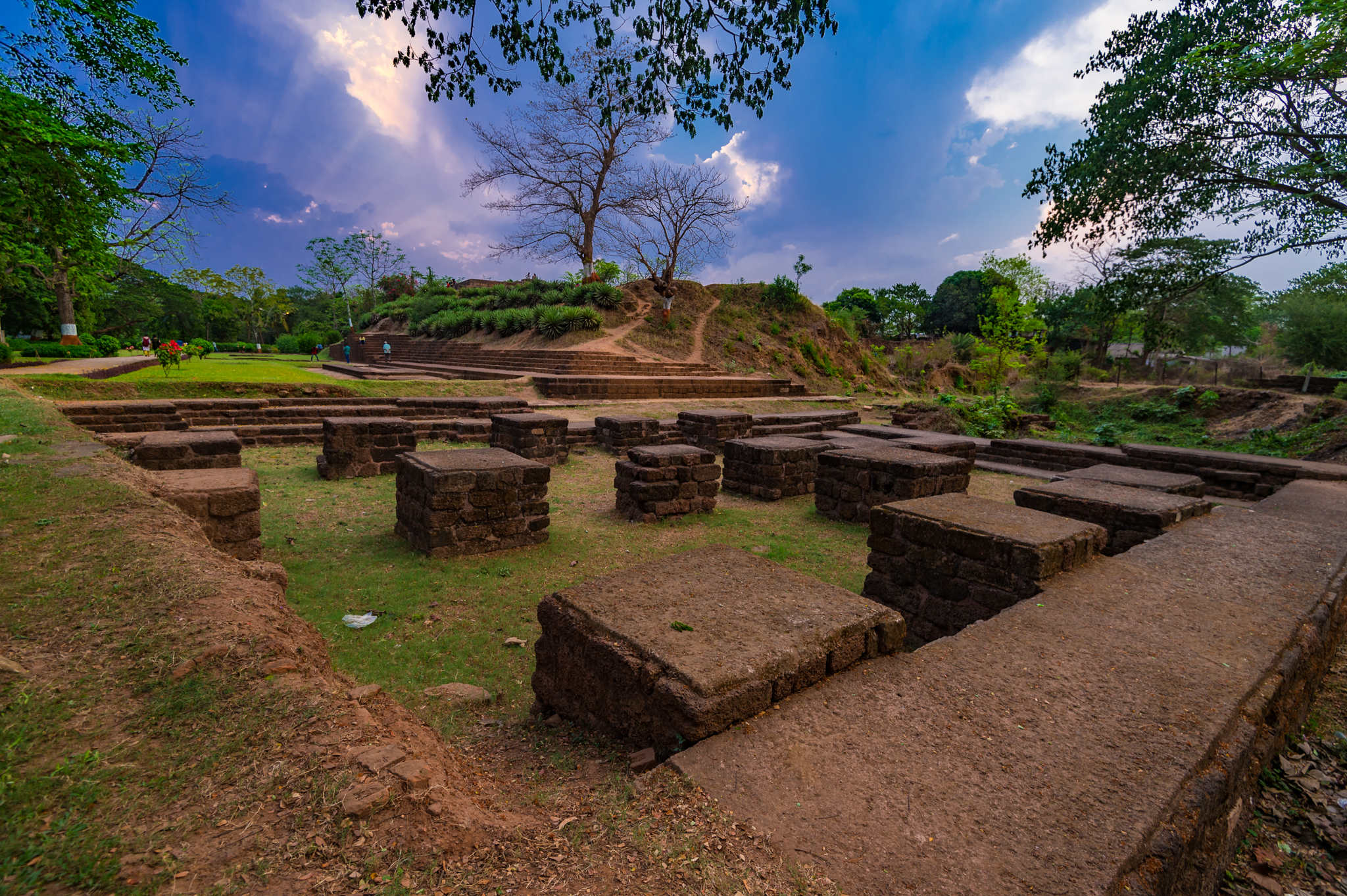
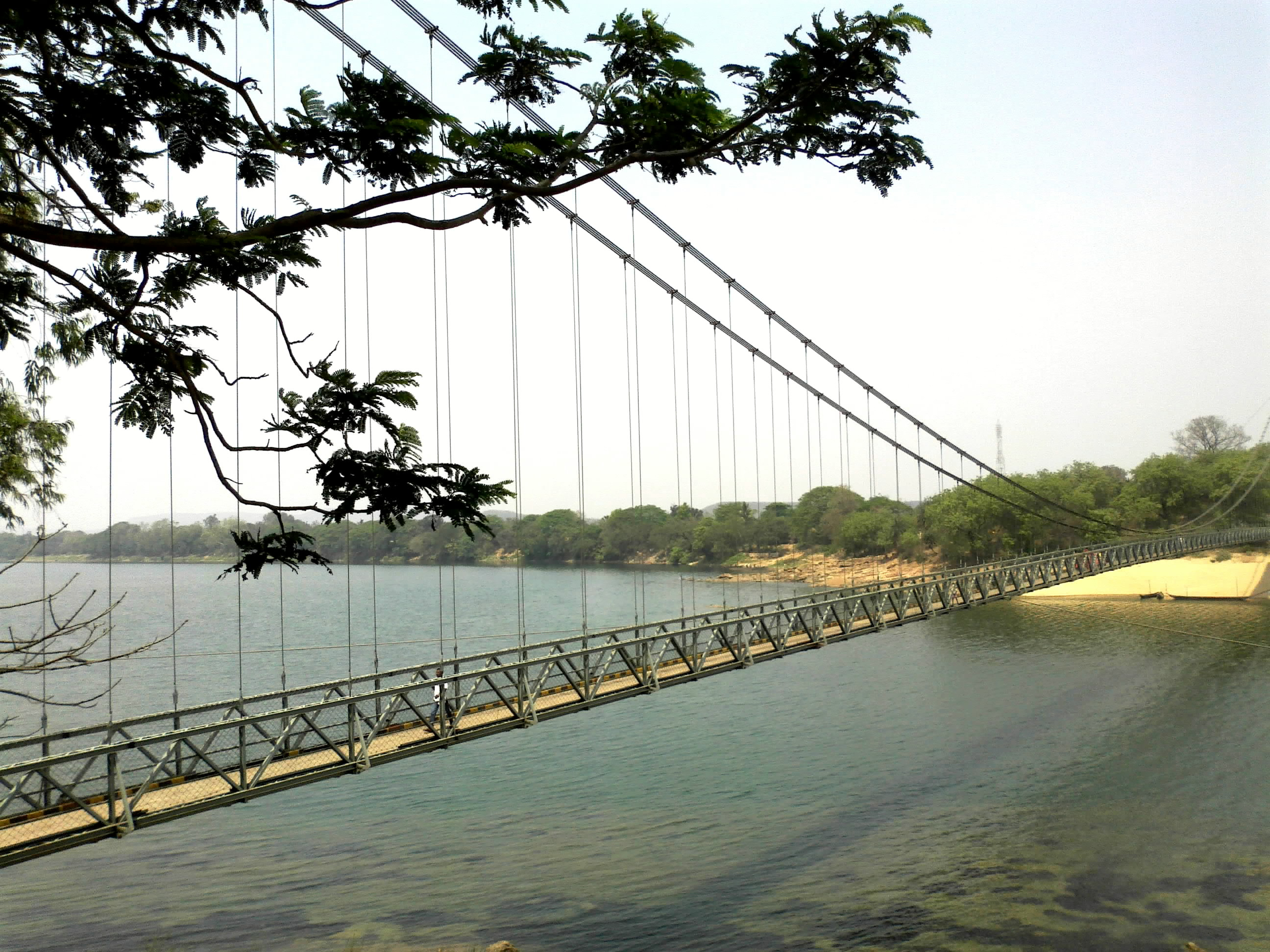
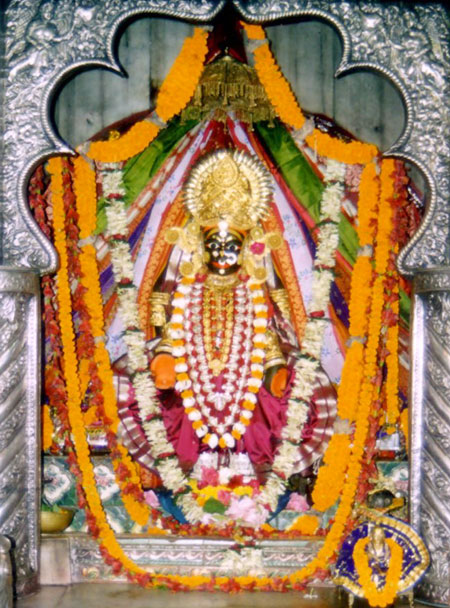
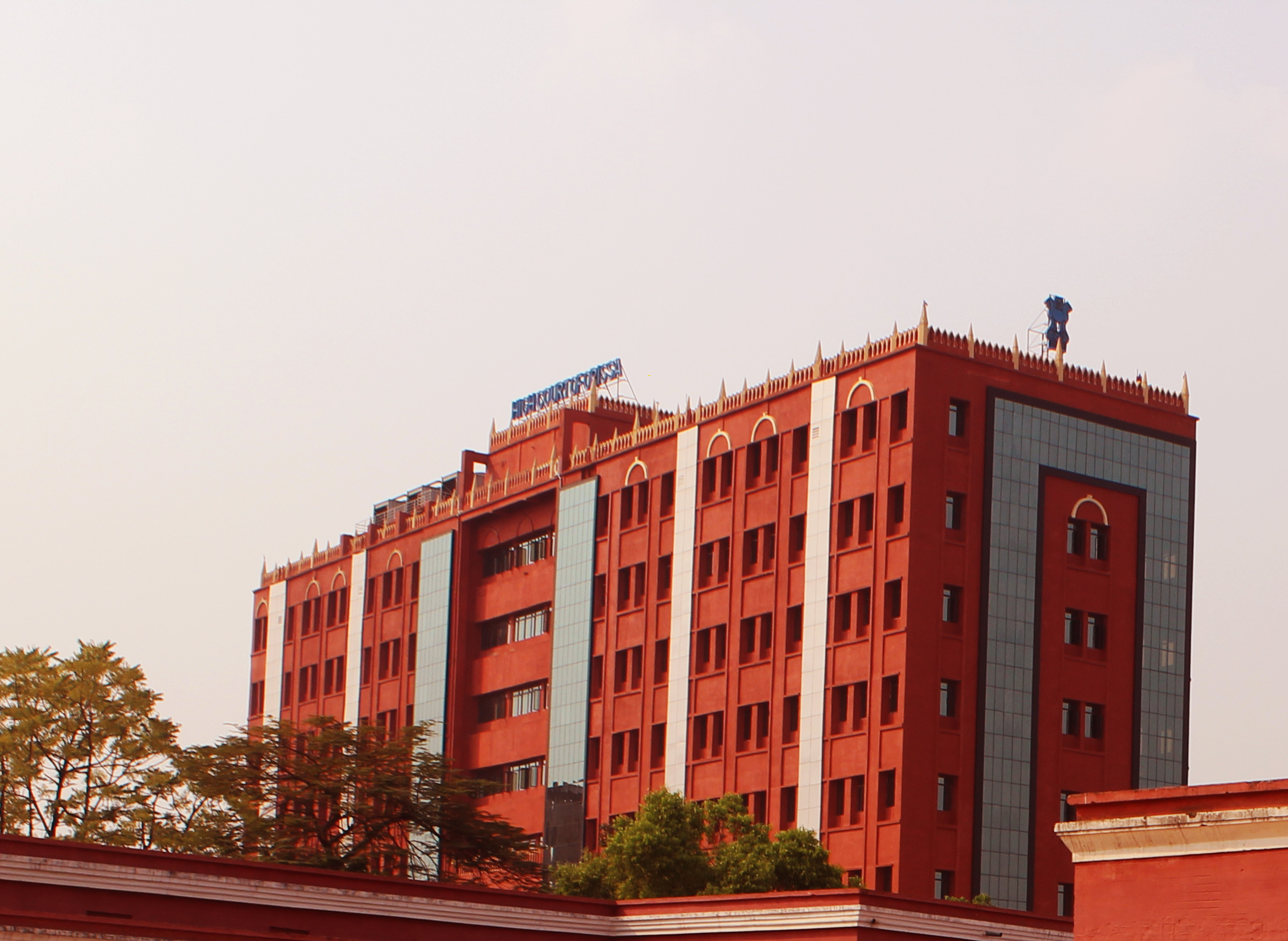
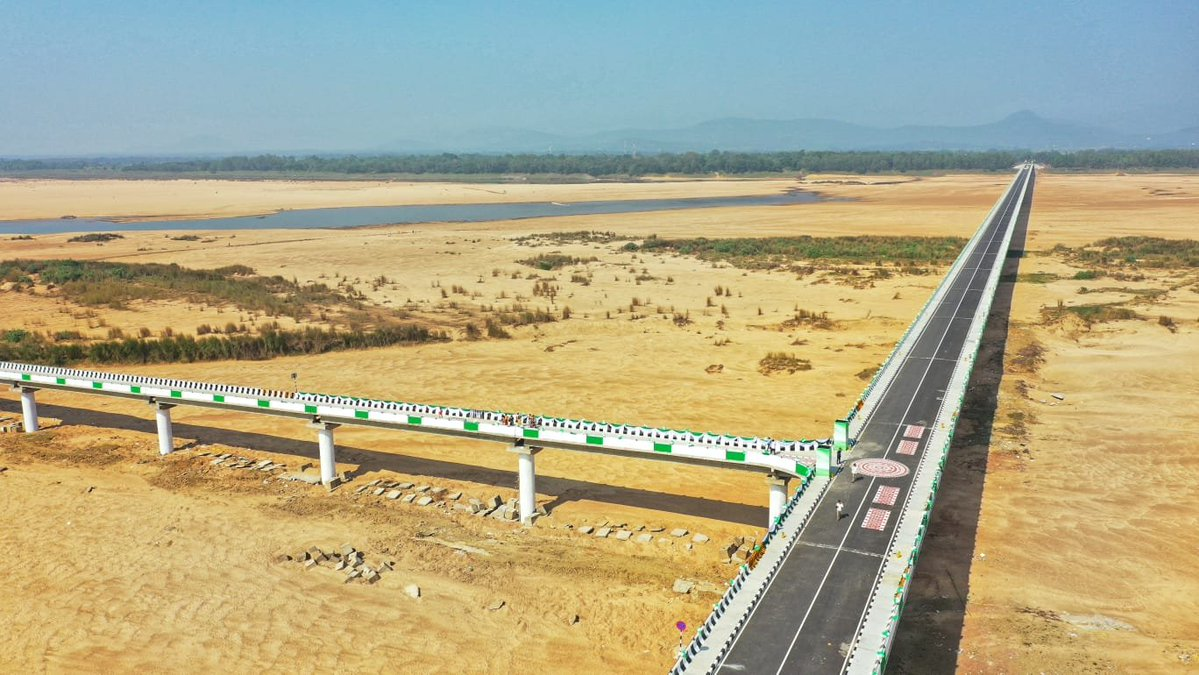
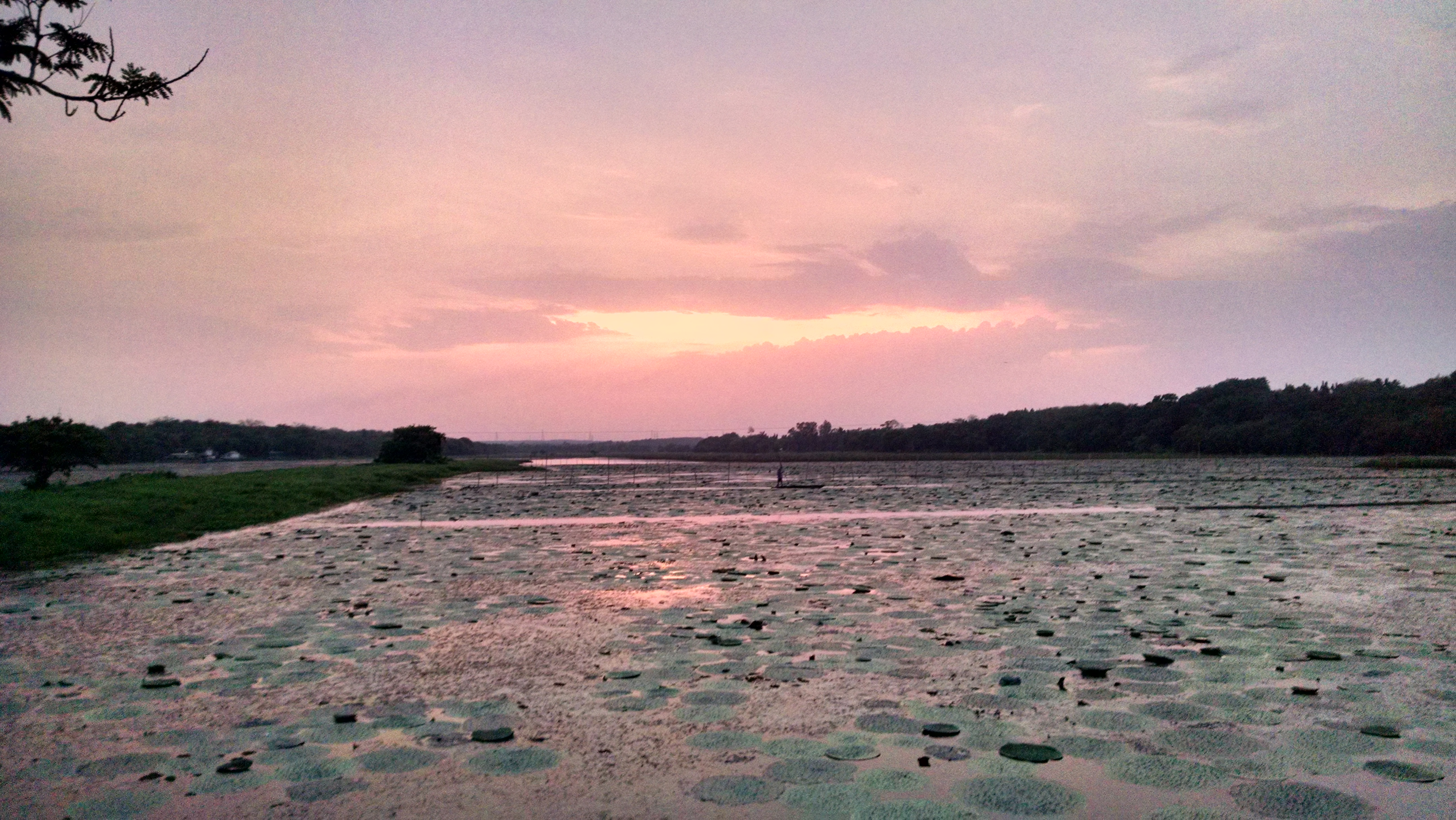
- Barabati Stadium Bali Jatra Barabati Fort Dhabaleswara bridge Cuttack Chandi Temple Orissa High Court Netaji Subhas Chandra Bose Setu Anshupa Lake
- Nicknames: Silver City; Millennium City
- Interactive map of Cuttack
- Location in Odisha, India Cuttack (India)
- Coordinates: 20°31′25″N 85°47′17″E
- State: Odisha
- District: Cuttack
- Established: 989 CE
- Founder: Markat Keshari of Keshari Dynasty
- Named for: Ancient military cantonment of Utkal

Government
  - Type: Municipal Corporation
  - Body: Cuttack Municipal Corporation
  - Mayor: Subhash Chandra Singh (BJD)
  - (MLA): 1. Sofia Firdous (INC); Barabati-Cuttack; 2. Souvic Biswal (BJD); Choudwar-Cuttack; 3. Prakash Ch. Sethi (BJP); Cuttack Sadar
  - MP: Bhartruhari Mahtab (BJP)
  - Municipal Commissioner: Dr. Amrit Ruturaj, IAS

Area
  - City: 192.5 km^{2} (74.3 sq mi)
  - Metro: 1,100 km^{2} (420 sq mi)
  - Rank: 2nd in Odisha
- Elevation: 36 m (118 ft)

Population (2011)
  - City: 610,189
  - Rank: India 72nd, Odisha 2nd
  - Density: 3,170/km^{2} (8,210/sq mi)
  - Metro: 653,149
- Demonym: Katakia

Languages
  - Official: Odia
- Time zone: UTC+5:30 (IST)
- ZIP code(s): 7530xx
- Telephone code: 0671
- Vehicle registration: OD-05
- UN/LOCODE: IN CUT
- Website: cmccuttack.odisha.gov.in

Cuttack (/ˈkʌtək/, officially Kataka [ˈkɔʈɔkɔ]), is the second largest city and the former capital of the Indian state of Odisha. It is also the headquarters of the Cuttack district. The name of the city is derived from the Odia and Sanskrit name Kataka, which literally means the fort, a reference to the ancient Barabati Fort around which the city initially developed. The Government of Odisha approved the restoration of the native spelling to reflect authentic Odia phonetics. Cuttack is known as the Millennium City as well as the Silver City due to its history of 1,000 years and famous silver filigree works respectively. The Orissa High Court and some other Odisha State Govt. offices are located there, and the city is the judicial capital of Odisha.

It is the commercial capital of Odisha and hosts many trading and business houses in and around the city. The city is known in Odisha for foods, such as the Thunkapuri, Dahibara, Lassi, various kinds of Chat, among others. Amongst all districts in Orissa, the undivided Cuttack district is known for its delicacies and sweets. Cuttack is also known for its Durga Puja, one of the major festivals of Odisha. A common destination of poets and artists, Cuttack also serves as a cultural hub within Odisha. The city is categorised as a Tier II city as per the ranking system used by the Government of India.

One particularly old and culturally relevant part of the city is centred on a strip of land between the Kathajodi River and the Mahanadi River, bounded on the south-east by Old Jagannath Road.

== Etymology ==
The name Cuttack is an anglicised form of Kataka (Odia: କଟକ, romanized: Kaṭaka) which is derived from Sanskrit कटक, meaning capital, fort and military establishment, or a cantonment. This transliteration emerged during British colonial rule. The city was known as Bidanasi Kataka (meaning Bidanasi Military Base) during the days when Barabati Fort was in existence. Bidanasi is now one of the localities of the city.

=== Renaming to Kataka ===
In 2024, the Mayor of the Cuttack Municipal Corporation, Subhash Chandra Singh, submitted a formal proposal to the Chief Minister of Odisha, Mohan Charan Majhi, seeking the renaming of Cuttack to “Katak”, citing it as the city’s original historic name.

In his letter, Singh referred to archival records preserved at the Records Department of Ravenshaw College, stating that the documents mention “Katak” as the traditional name historically used for the city. He also noted that the archival references had been highlighted in newspapers, bringing the issue into public discussion.

The Mayor urged the Government of Odisha to initiate an official review process, including consultation with historians, cultural organisations and local communities, to assess the historical and cultural basis of the proposal. He stated that restoring the historic name would help preserve cultural heritage, strengthen local identity and ensure clarity in official references.

Singh further requested that, if approved, the renaming be implemented through appropriate administrative and legislative measures, including official notifications, amendments to the state gazette and updates to public signage. The proposal followed a then recent decision by the Odisha government to revise the English spellings of several place names across the state.

On 12 June 2026, the Odisha state Cabinet approved the correction of colonial-era distorted English spellings for 64 locations across 26 districts, officially restoring Cuttack to its original Odia phonetic form Kataka. The announcement was made by Odisha Chief Secretary Anu Garg, who stated that the colonial-era distortions had diluted the state's linguistic heritage and cultural identity.

On 22 June 2026, the Revenue and Disaster Management Department issued the Corrected English spelling of the names of Administrative unit Notification, formally implementing corrected English spellings of various administrative place names across the state. The changes were also published in the Odisha Gazette on the same day. The notification followed approval by the Odisha State Cabinet to revise anglicised or historically distorted spellings in order to align them with original Odia phonetic forms. The initiative follows recommendations by a high-level committee chaired by Pratibha Ray, which reviewed thousands of public suggestions and identified distorted "Apabhransa" names to restore.

== History ==
The earliest written history of Cuttack may go back to the Keshari dynasty. As stated by the historian Andrew Stirling, present-day Cuttack was established as a military cantonment by king Nrupa Keshari of the Keshari dynasty in 989 CE. Stirling based his opinion on the Madala Panji, a chronicle of the Jagannatha temple of Puri. The reign of Maharaja Markata Keshari was distinguished for the stone embank built to protect the new capital from flooding in 1002 CE.

Historical and archaeological evidence suggests Cuttack became the capital of a kingdom founded by Raja Anangabhimadeva III of the Ganga dynasty in 1211 CE. After the end of Ganga rule, Odisha passed to the hands of the Suryavamsi Gajapati dynasty (1434–1541 CE), under whom Cuttack continued to be the capital of Odisha. After the death of Raja Mukunda deva, the last Hindu king of Orissa, Cuttack first came under Muslim rule and later under Mughals, who made Cuttack the seat of the new Orissa Subah (imperial top-level province) under Shah Jahan.

By 1750, Cuttack came under the Maratha Empire, and grew fast as a business center, serving as a point of contact between the Bhonsale Marathas of Nagpur and the English merchants of Bengal. The term "Attock te Cuttack" (Attock to Cuttack) was first used to describe the extent of the Maratha Empire after they conquered Cuttack in 1750 and Attock in 1758. It was occupied by the British in 1803 and later became the capital of the Odisha division in 1816. From 1948 onwards, when the capital was shifted to Bhubaneswar, the city remained the administrative headquarters for the state of Odisha. Cuttack is sometimes referred to as the Judicial Capital, as it is where the Orissa High Court is located. Also, it may be referred to as one half of Odisha's Twin Capital.

The introduction of the Sharadiya Utsav tradition in the city dates back to the visit of Saint Chaitanya in the 16th century, when the consecration of the idol of Durga by using the mask pattern was conducted in his presence at Binod Behari Devi Mandap.

The remains of the old moated Barabati Fort still exist in the heart of Cuttack.

== Geography ==
Cuttack is located at 20°31′23″N 085°47′17″E and has an average elevation of 36 metres (118 ft). The city is spread across an area of 192.5 km^{2} (74 sq mi). The city is a Cuttack Municipal Corporation, which consists of 59 wards. The city stretches from Phulnakhara in the south to Choudwar in the north and Kandarpur in the east to Naraj in the west, while the main city is located at the apex of the Mahanadi River delta. Apart from the Mahanadi, four of its distributaries also run through the city. The distributaries include the Mahanadi, Kathajodi, Kuakhai, and Birupa rivers, where Kathajodi further has two distributaries, the right being Devi while the left is Biluakhai. Mahanadi runs through the city on the northern side, separating the main city from the Jagatpur Industrial Area. The Kathajodi River forms a riverine island called Bayalis Mouza after separating the main city from Gopalpur. The Kuakhai River separates the southern part of the city into two halves, namely Pratap Nagri and the new township of Naranpur. The Kuakhai runs throughout the south of the city along Phulnakhara before entering Bhubaneswar. The Birupa river runs through the north of Jagatpur Industrial Area, separating it from Choudwar. There are numerous ponds known as (pokharis) in the city that store rainwater. The Mahanadi provides much of the drinking water to the city. Recent growth of the city has resulted in expansion across the Kathajodi River, and a newer township towards the head of the delta formed between the tributary Kathajodi river and the main river Mahanadi has come up by the name of Markat Nagar (popularly known as CDA by the local residents), which is spread across 2000 acres. CDA has 15 sectors out of which 11 are residential and has a population of around 150,000. Jagatpur and Mahanadi Vihar are the other two townships in the city. Mahanadi Vihar is the first satellite city project in Odisha. Naranpur is another satellite township coming up in Trishulia, on the other side of the Kathajodi River.

=== Climate ===
Cuttack experiences a tropical wet and dry climate. The summer season is from March to June, when the climate is hot and humid. The temperature around this season is 35 °C to 40 °C. Thunderstorms are common at the height of the summer. The monsoon months are from July to October, when the city receives most of its rainfall from the South West Monsoon. The annual rainfall is around 1,597.9 millimetres (159.79 cm). Temperatures are considerably lower during the rainy season, averaging around 30 °C. The winter season from November to February is characterised by mild temperatures and occasional showers. The winter months feature chilly northerly winds, which bring down the temperature to around 15 °C, though the bright sunshine helps maintain the pleasant weather. Temperatures may exceed 45 °C at the height of summer and may fall below 10 °C in winter. The highest recorded temperature is 47.7 °C (117.9 °F) recorded on 2 May 1957, and the lowest is 5.8 °C (42.4 °F) recorded on 7 January 1986.

Due to its proximity to the coast, the city is prone to cyclones from the Bay of Bengal. One such cyclone struck Cuttack in 1971, resulting in more than 10,000 deaths in the state. The Bureau of Indian Standards places the city inside seismic zone III on a scale ranging from I to V in order of increasing susceptibility to earthquakes. The United Nations Development Programme reports that there is a very high damage risk from winds and cyclones. The 1999 Odisha cyclone caused major damage to the city, claiming many lives.

Climate data for Cuttack (1991–2020, extremes 1901–2020)
Month	Jan	Feb	Mar	Apr	May	Jun	Jul	Aug	Sep	Oct	Nov	Dec	Year
Record high °C (°F)	36.6 (97.9)	40.1 (104.2)	42.8 (109.0)	45.0 (113.0)	47.7 (117.9)	47.2 (117.0)	42.3 (108.1)	38.4 (101.1)	41.1 (106.0)	40.0 (104.0)	36.9 (98.4)	33.7 (92.7)	47.7 (117.9)
Mean daily maximum °C (°F)	28.7 (83.7)	32.0 (89.6)	35.4 (95.7)	37.0 (98.6)	37.4 (99.3)	35.0 (95.0)	32.2 (90.0)	32.0 (89.6)	32.6 (90.7)	32.4 (90.3)	30.8 (87.4)	28.8 (83.8)	32.9 (91.2)
Mean daily minimum °C (°F)	14.3 (57.7)	17.7 (63.9)	21.6 (70.9)	23.8 (74.8)	25.0 (77.0)	24.8 (76.6)	24.0 (75.2)	23.9 (75.0)	23.8 (74.8)	22.3 (72.1)	18.3 (64.9)	14.3 (57.7)	21.1 (70.0)
Record low °C (°F)	5.8 (42.4)	8.5 (47.3)	13.0 (55.4)	13.5 (56.3)	16.5 (61.7)	17.0 (62.6)	18.2 (64.8)	17.5 (63.5)	17.0 (62.6)	14.0 (57.2)	10.0 (50.0)	7.5 (45.5)	5.8 (42.4)
Average rainfall mm (inches)	14.0 (0.55)	16.6 (0.65)	23.8 (0.94)	45.0 (1.77)	106.0 (4.17)	196.0 (7.72)	361.4 (14.23)	365.0 (14.37)	258.4 (10.17)	176.2 (6.94)	31.4 (1.24)	4.1 (0.16)	1,598 (62.91)
Average rainy days	0.7	1.2	1.6	3.0	5.1	9.6	15.0	15.6	12.0	6.8	1.7	0.4	72.8
Average relative humidity (%) (at 17:30 IST)	55	50	52	59	61	70	79	81	79	73	65	58	65
Source: India Meteorological Department

Cuttack has been ranked as the 9th best National Clean Air City among the category-2 3-10L population category in India according to the 'Swachh Vayu Survekshan 2024 Results'.

== Culture ==
=== Pilgrimage sites ===
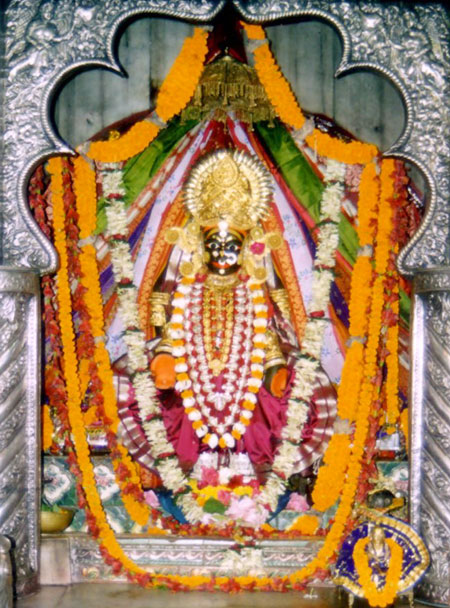
Cuttack Chandi Deity

==== Kataka Chandi Mandir ====
Dedicated to the Goddess Chandi, the presiding deity of Cuttack, the Kataka Chandi Mandir is located in proximity to the banks of the Mahanadi River. It is famous for its annual Durga Puja and Kali Puja festivals. The Durga Puja festivities are prominent in Maa Kataka Chandi mandir, which takes place for 16 days starting from the dark fortnight of Ashwina Krishna Ashtami till Ashwina Shukla Navami and Vijayadashami. The goddess, popularly called Maa Kataka Chandi, sits and rules in the heart of the ancient city. Gada Chandi Mandir, situated within the premises of the Barabati Fort, is one of the oldest temples in Kataka and is believed to be the older temple of Kataka Chandi before her shift to the present Kataka Chandi Mandir.

==== Dhabaleshwar Temple ====
Dedicated to the worship of Lord Shiva, Dhabaleswar Temple is situated on an island in the Mahanadi River and is embellished with stone carvings that date back to the early 10th and 11th centuries. The island is connected to the mainland on the other side by a suspension bridge, which is the first and only of its kind in the state.

==== Paramhansa Nath Temple ====
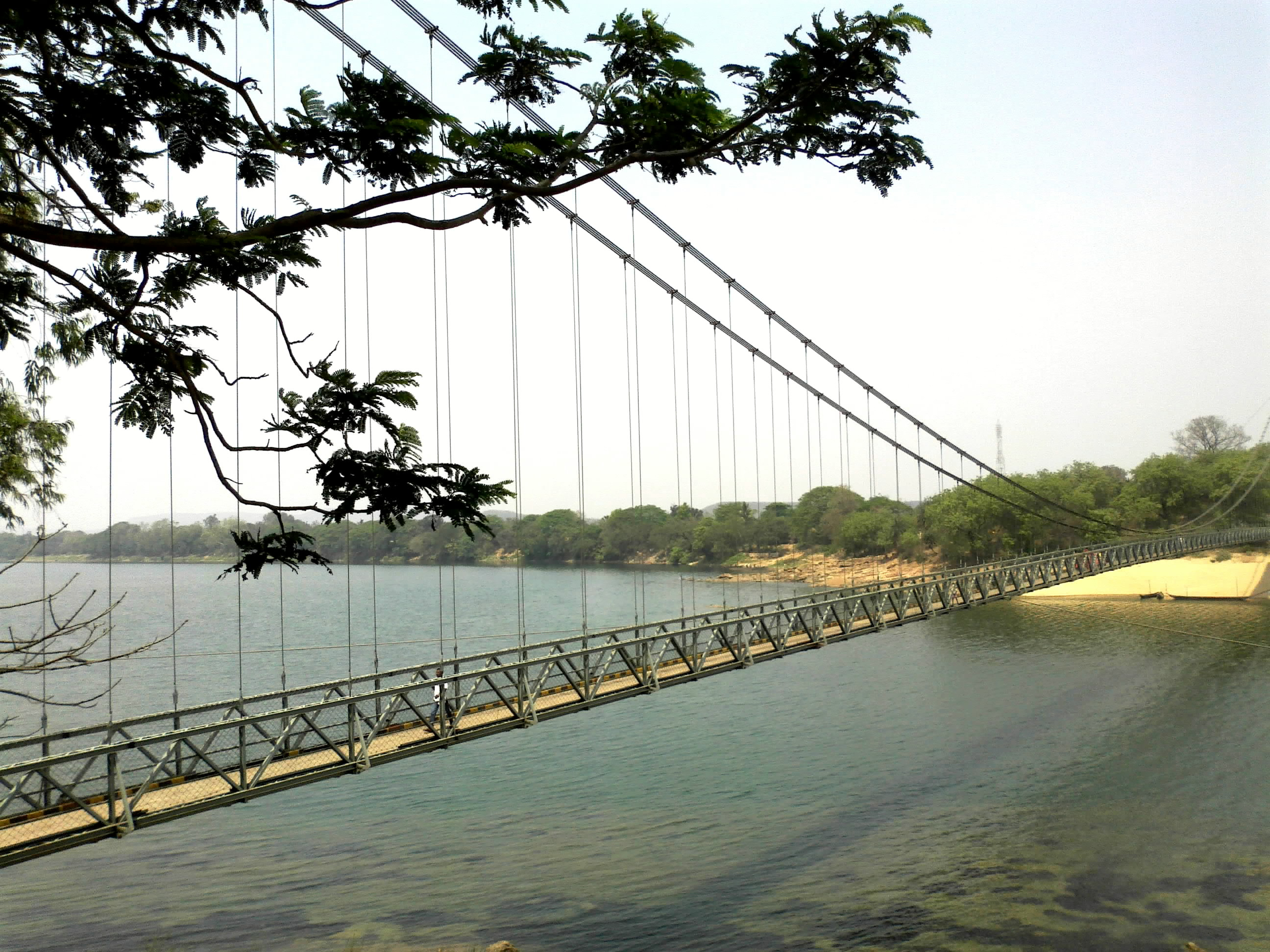
Dhabaleswara Bridge

Paramhansa Nath Temple, Biribat built, 11th A.D., 4 km from the Cuttack-Paradeep Road. It is situated right on the banks of the River Kathajodi, and has been standing at 80 feet for 1000 years. It is a five-chambered rekha and pidha shrine. The Vimana is of Pancharatha Rekha style. The doorjambs of the vimana and the bhogomandapa portray sculptures of the navagraha and dvarapalas. The plinth of the temple exhibits sculptures portraying war scenes, elephants and horses in procession, and decorated swans. In the sanctum a Patal-Phuta Shiva Linga can be found, as well as a wooden canopy, possibly added sometime in the mid-15th or 16th century. Other deities around the temple are Parvati, Kartikeya, and Ganesh. A large bull figure and Rama-abhisekha images are found on the northern wall of the temple. Two Vishnu images are found on the outer walls of the temple. The temple was built by the Somavanshi Dynasty.

==== Baba Ramdev Temple ====
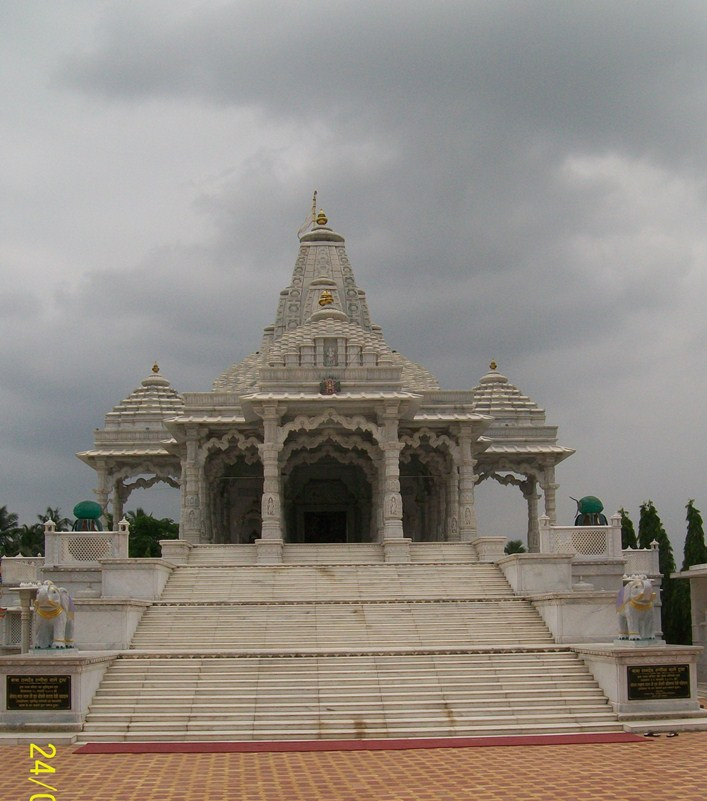
Baba Ramdev Temple

The temple is located beside the Cuttack–Bhubaneswar national highway. It is built entirely of white marble. Ramdev Pir is a Hindu folk deity of Rajasthan in India. Ramdev is considered to be an incarnation of Krishna. He was said to have had miraculous powers, and was well-known in the surrounding areas. One legend suggests that five Pirs from Mecca came to test Ramdev's powers.

==== Gurdwara Guru Nanak Daatan Sahib ====
A holy historical Sikh shrine, the Daatan Sahib Gurdwara, is where the first Sikh Guru, Shree Guru Nanak, halted on his way to Puri. It is believed that a tree branch planted by him after using it as a tooth cleaner still flourishes here, hence the name Daatan Sahib.

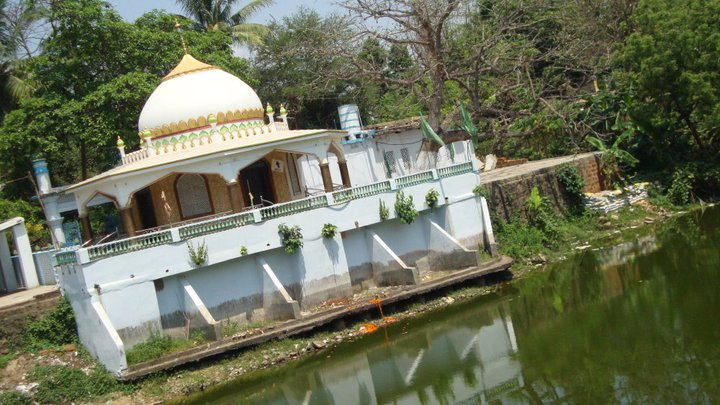
Bukhari Baba Peer

==== Digambar Jain Mandir ====
There are four Jain temples in Cuttack City that were established by Digambar and Swetambar Jain sects who had migrated to Cuttack from Uttar Pradesh and Rajasthan. These are situated at Choudhury Bazar, Jaunliapatty, Alamchand Bazar, and Kaji Bazar. Tirthankara images have been installed in these temples. The Digambar Jain temple at the Choudhury Bazar was constructed during the second half of the 20th century, and has notable design elements.

==== The Church of Epiphany ====
Although there are several churches in Cuttack, the oldest among them is the Church of Epiphany on the Cantonment Road, built in the year 1865. Its brick structure is a tell-tale example of British-era colonial architecture.

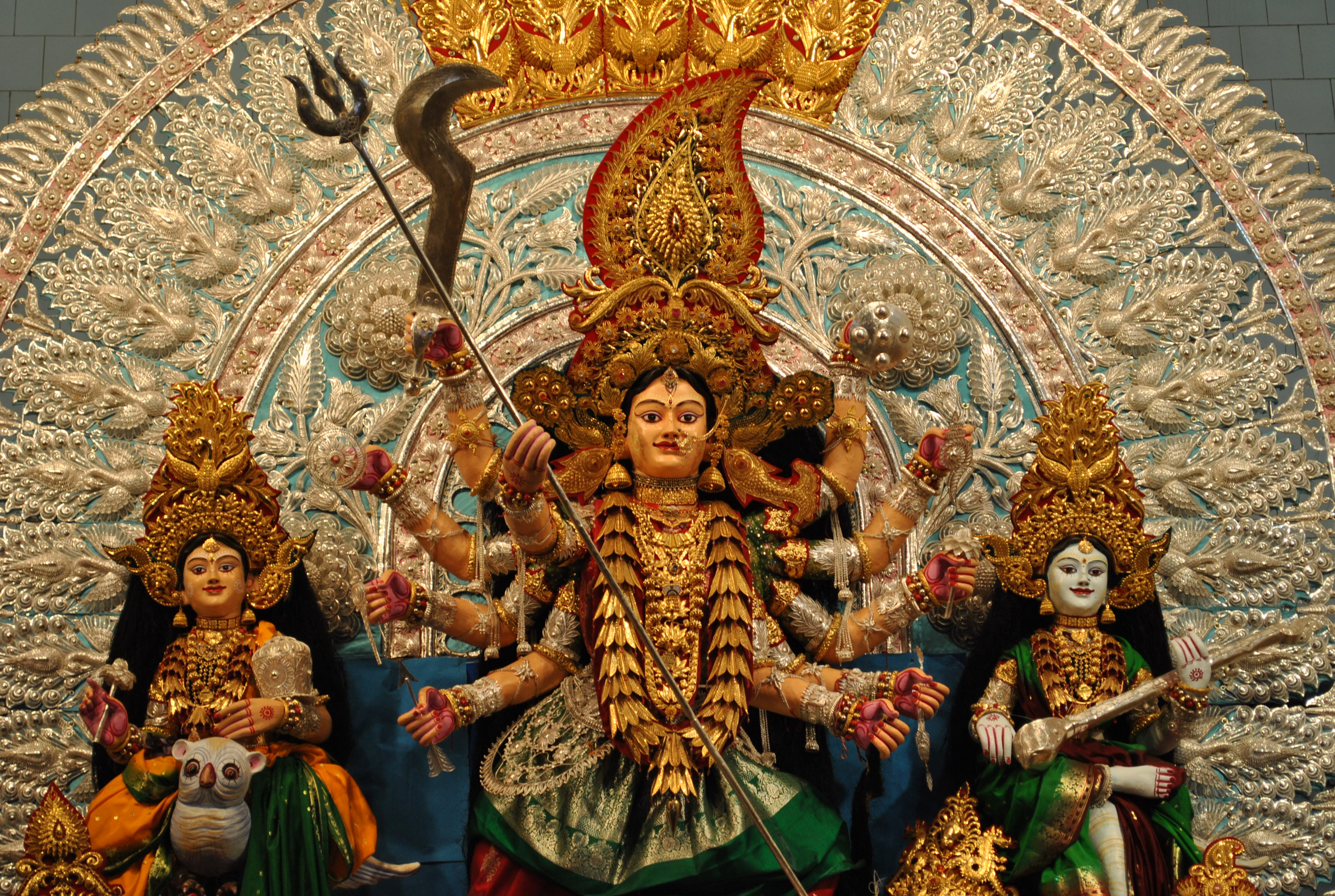
Goddess Durga Idol in Chaudhury Bazar

Other notable temples in Cuttack include the Gada Chandi Temple, the Khannagar Sai Mandir, the Amareswar Temple, the Raghunath Jew Temple, the Gopal Jew Temple, the Nitai Gouranga Matha, the Rasabihari Matha, the Shyamsundar Matha, the Ramakriskna Mission, the Maa Jhanjhirimangala Temple, the Dolamundai Jagannath Temple, the Chahata Ram Mandir, the Badambadi Siddhivinayak Temple, the Khannagar Kali Mandir, and the Kalia Boda Shani Temple. Cuttack also houses many churches, including the Holy Rosary Church and the Oriya Baptist Church.

=== Festivals ===
- Durga Puja: Cuttack is known throughout the nation for its Durga puja celebrations. Nearly 200 earthen idols of Goddess Durga are prepared by the different puja committees of the city to worship Goddess Durga. The speciality of Cuttack Durga Puja is its Durga Puja Suna Medha, in which the idols are adorned with huge amounts of gold and silver, with localities trying to outsmart each other by constructing more attractive idols. Cuttack celebrates Durga Puja with full energy on Maha Saptami, Maha Ashtami, Maha Navami, and Vijaya Dashami or Dussehra by burning an effigy of the demon Ravana. People from all of Odisha and nearby states visit Cuttack during this period to observe the famous festival.
- Boita Bandana: This festival is celebrated on the last day of the holy Hindu month of Kartik. On this auspicious day, people flow miniature boitas or model boats in the Mahanadi and Kathajodi rivers to pay homage to the ancient merchants of Kalinga Kingdom. This day also marks the beginning of Bali Jatra. This festival is similar to the Masakapam Kepesih festival of Bali, and to the Loi Krathong festival of Thailand, both of which involve ritualistic floating of model boats around the same time of year. In 2022, it etched its name in the Guinness Book of World Records through an initiative by Cuttack District administration and Mayor Subhash Singh, where over 2100 students of 22 schools made over 22,000 paper boats in 35 minutes, creating the world record.
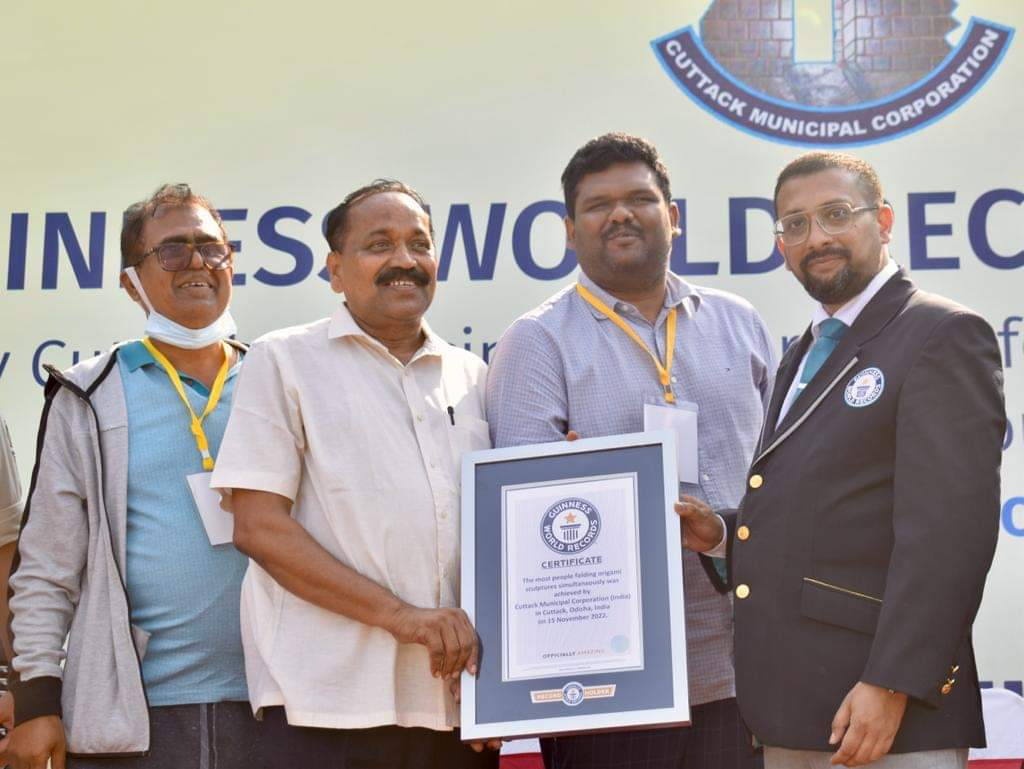
  Guinness Book of World Records for Balijatra. Record Number of paper boats created under 35 mins. Initiative by CMC and Mayor Subhash Singh
- Bali Jatra: The festival to which the people of Cuttack await the most is the Bali Jatra. Bali Yatra is supposedly the second largest trade festival in Asia and the largest in India. The name Bali Jatra literally means A Voyage to Bali. In olden times, merchants used to trade with the Southeast Asian island countries of Bali, Java, Sumatra, and Borneo. Whatever items they brought from those places after trading Oriya goods used to be put up for sale in the capital (which was then Cuttack). People from all over the state and beyond used to come to Cuttack to buy these items. Bali Jatra is the festival of continuing this ancient tradition. It is held every year in November on the banks of the Mahanadi. Many stalls are set up, selling both local and exotic goods. People from all over Odisha come to the Bali Jatra to buy items, as was the custom back in those days.
- Kali puja: This festival is dedicated to the Hindu goddess Kali and is celebrated on the new moon day of the Hindu month of Kartik. It coincides with the pan-Indian festival of Diwali amidst the bursting of firecrackers.
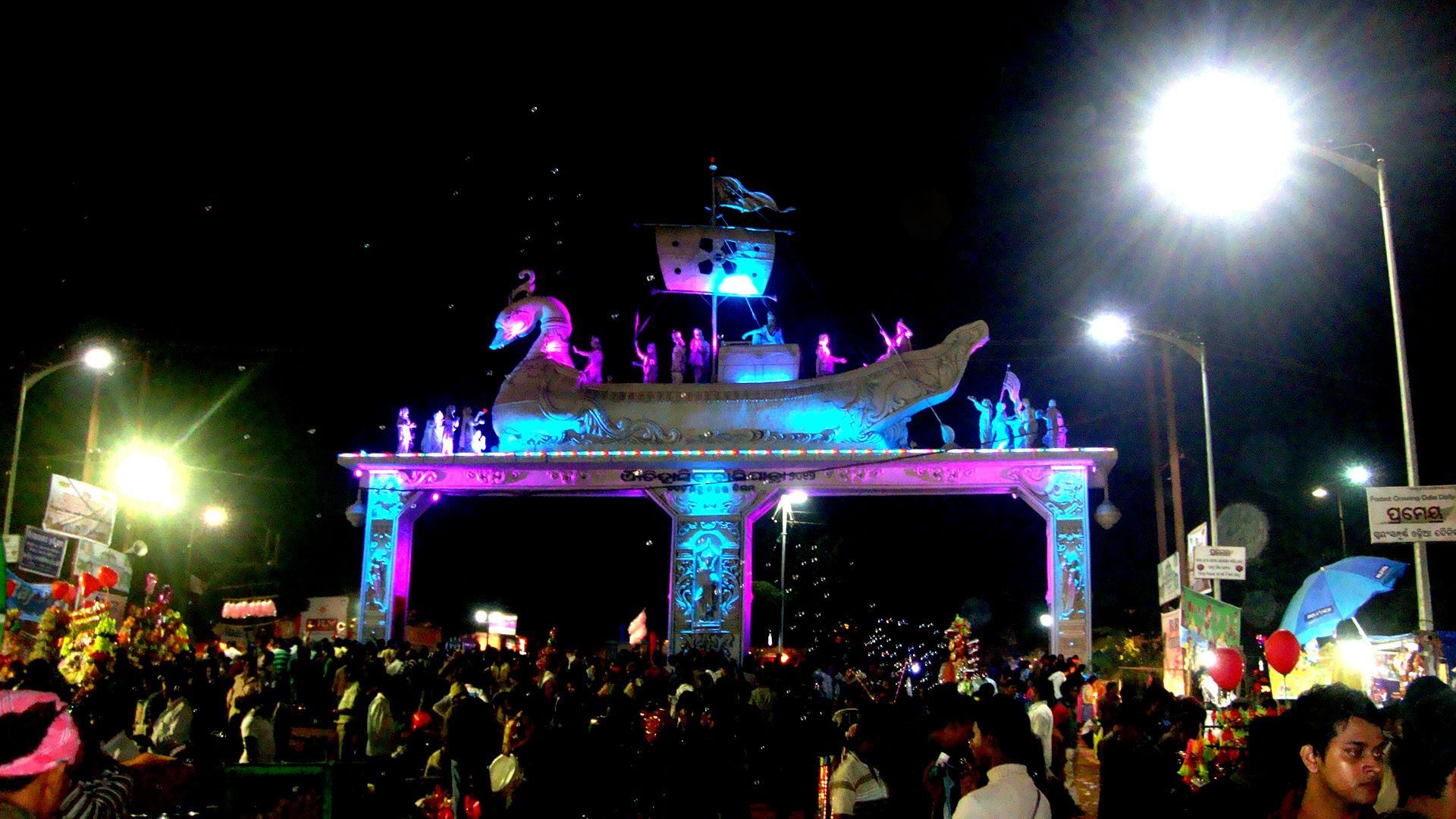
  Bali Jatra Entrance Gate
- Kartikeshwar Puja: The puja in Cuttack is organised by the puja committees of Cuttack. This festival is observed to worship Kartikeya, the eldest son of Lord Shiva. Nowhere else except Sabarimala is the Kartikeswar puja carried out with so much elan.
- Bada Osha: This is unique to Dhabaleswar Temple. Special Bhoga, namely Gaja and Tarana, are prepared on this day for the worshippers.
- Manabasa Gurubara was unique to Cuttack Odisha, later celebrated by east Odisha; west Odisha is worship to goddess Laxmi.
- Kite flying is also celebrated with much enthusiasm and energy in the city. Kite-flying culminates with the Makar Sankranti, with kite-flying competitions being held all over. Cuttack is the first city in Eastern India to introduce kite-flying.

All the other regular Indian festivals like Ratha Yatra, Raja, Ganesh Chaturthi, Vasant Panchami, Holi, Diwali, Chhath, Eid, Good Friday, Christmas, and the numerous festivals are celebrated here.

=== Cuisine ===
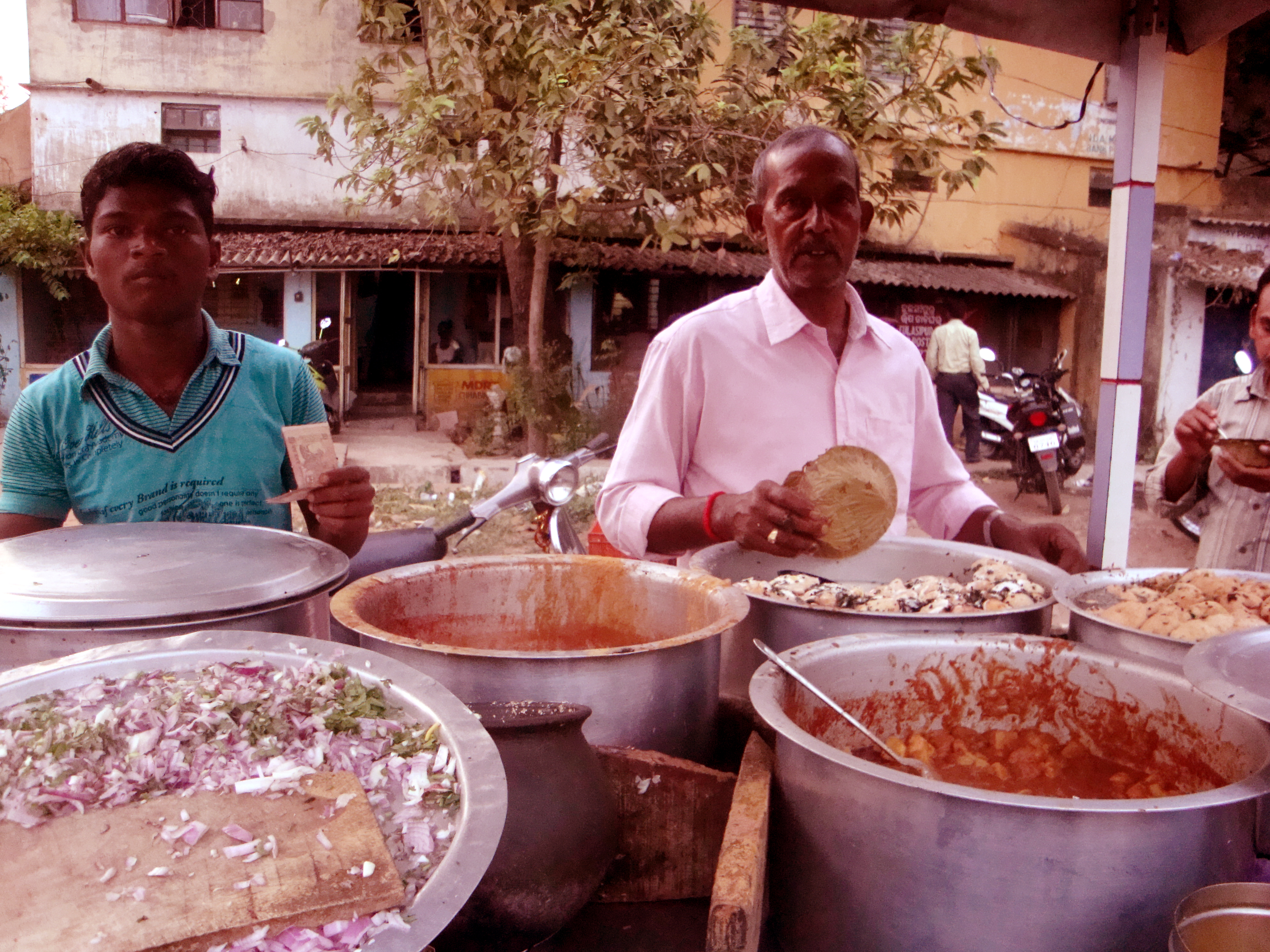
Cuttack Dahibara Aloodam

Cuttack is the street food capital of Odisha. It is famous for its Dahibara Aludam, a local delicacy made using black gram (a cousin of the mung bean) and potato curry.Chhena poda and Rasagulla from Salepur by Bikalananda Kar are local desserts made of unripened curd cheese made from buffalo or cow milk. Apart from Dahibara Aloodam: Chaat, Gupchup (puchuka / panipuri), and samosas rule the streets. The city has major food joints like Chandini Chowk, Bidanasi, Stadium Road, Buxi Bazar, Dolamundai, Choudhary Bazar, etc. Thunka puri is a famous delicacy available only during Baliyatra. Traditional Oriya food such as Dahi-Pakhal (rice soaked in water with yoghurt and seasonings) is considered a body coolant, accompanied by Badi chura or saga, and is consumed during the months of April–June.

Due to the quantity of Muslim households in the city, traditional Islamic and Mughlai cuisines like Biriyani, Tandoor, and Sheer kurma are also popular among the denizens. Due to its close proximity to Paradip and Mahanadi catchment areas, Cuttack is one of the major producers and consumers of fish. Fish curry is a popular dish among Odia households.

== Art and literature ==
Cuttack has been home to many notable personalities that have contributed substantially to the culture and history of modern Odisha. Some consider Cuttack the cultural capital of Odisha.

=== Drama and theatre culture ===
Cuttack had been the centre of art and literature in the past. Annapurna Theatre is considered the pioneer of the Oriya theatre company. The B-Group of the Annapurna theatre, situated in Buxi Bazar, is also one of the oldest theatres in Odisha. Kala Vikash Kendra in Cuttack is another institution for dance, drama, and music in Odisha. It organises international theatre olympiads annually where artists from different countries participate along with the local artists. Sarala Sahitya Sansad, Utkal Sahitya Samaj, and Marwari Yuva Manch are some other organisations contributing to the rich culture of Odisha.

=== Libraries, art galleries and auditoriums ===
Cuttack has been the seat of various literary activities, and many notable writers and poets lived and worked here. There are many old libraries in Cuttack, including the first library of the state, Kanika Library at Ravenshaw University, Biswanath Pandit Central Library, Odisha Urdu Library, Madhusudan Library, PK Padhihari Pathagara, Bakul Library, and Biren Mitra Library. CMC Sahid Bhawan has a large art gallery for exhibitions. Town Hall, KVK, Sahid Bhawan, Satabdi Bhawan, and Sarala Bhawan are the prominent auditoriums in the city.

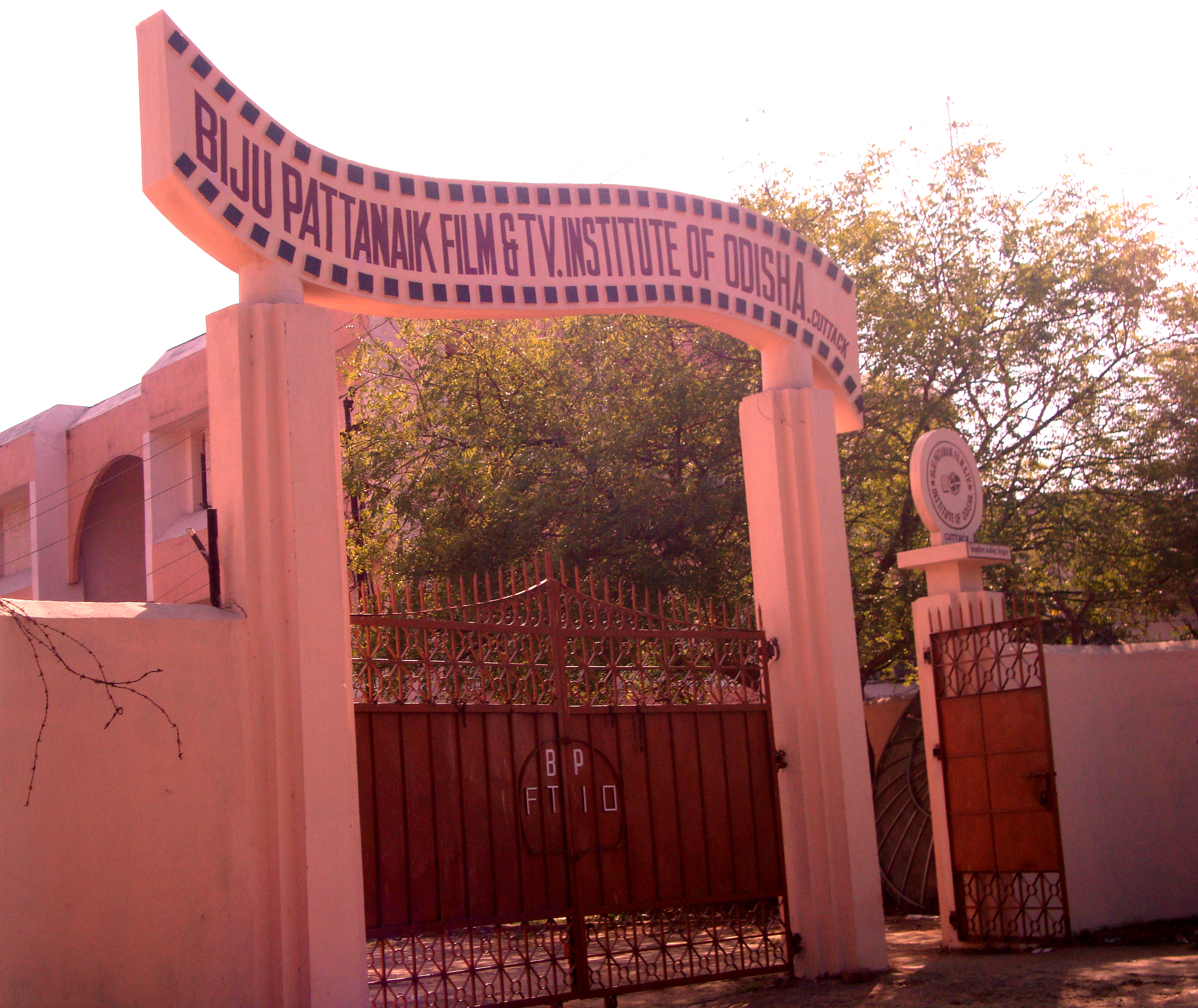
Biju Pattnaik Film and Television Institute of Odisha at Jobra

=== Odia film industry ===
The Odia film industry has its base in Cuttack. The Oriya film industry is popularly known as Ollywood, a portmanteau of the words Oriya and Hollywood. In 1974, the then CM of Orissa, Nandini Satpathy declared film-making and construction of cinema theatres as industry in the state, and two years later, in 1976 Orissa Film Development Corporation was established in Cuttack. One of the regional offices for the Central Board of Film Certification is situated in Cuttack.

=== Movie theatres ===
The city has several cinemas playing movies in Odia, Hindi, and English. Historically, Cuttack accounted for almost half of the number of cinema halls in the state, but eventually, those numbers declined. Presently, Cuttack hosts five single-screen cinemas named Grand, Brindaban, Samrat, Nishamani, and Jayashree. It also houses two multiplexes, namely Inox and Sangam, the former being the state's second four-screen multiplex after its Bhubaneswar branch. Odisha's First Cinema Hall marks its beginning from Cuttack. In 1926, a mobile cinema hall named Chameria Cinema Company showed films. Thereafter, Annapurna Theatre came into existence. In 1932, Hallmuk Cinema Hall marked its beginning at Tinkonia Bagicha. Movies like Harischandra and Odia's first movie, Sita Bibaha, were screened at this cinema hall in 1934. Another cinema hall named Capital Cinema was also built in Tinkonia Bagicha in 1936. The second Odia film, Lalita, was released at the same hall. Similarly, in 1944–45 Pravat Cinema Hall near Baropathar, in 1951 Hind Cinema was built. In 1962, United Talkies opened in Saheed Bhawan. Thereafter, Parvati Talkies was also built in Kalyanmandap of Cuttack Municipality. In 1969, Grand Cinema and Suraj Talkies and 1972 Jyoti Cinema, which was renamed Laxmi Hall, started. Later, more opened: Durga Hall (1979), Nisamani Hall, Samrat Hall (1980), Brundaban Hall, Sagar Sangam Hall, Devi Cinema (1982), Rajtarangini (1983), Jaysree Talkies (1985). In 2018, Inox Multiplex opened, as Odisha's second after Bhubaneswar Inox.

== Demographics ==
=== Population (2011) ===
Historical population
Year	Pop.	±%
1872	42,667	—
1881	42,656	−0.0%
1891	47,186	+10.6%
1901	51,364	+8.9%
1911	52,528	+2.3%
1921	51,007	−2.9%
1931	65,263	+27.9%
1941	74,291	+13.8%
1951	102,505	+38.0%
1961	146,308	+42.7%
1971	205,759	+40.6%
1981	295,268	+43.5%
1991	403,418	+36.6%
2001	534,654	+32.5%
2011	610,189	+14.1%
Source: Census of India

According to the 2011 census of India, the population of Cuttack City in 2011 was 610,189: 316,242 male and 293,947 female. Its urban / metropolitan population was 653,149, of which 338,788 are males and 314,361 are females. There were 48,585 children aged 0–6, 8.02% of the total population of Cuttack City: 25,358 boys and 23,227 girls. The gender ratio of Cuttack City was 997 per 1000 males, and for children, 916 girls per 1000 boys.

=== Literacy (2011) ===
Literacy in Cuttack
Literacy	Percent
Male	94.12%
Female	84.49%
All	91.17%

Cuttack has an average literacy rate of 91.17%, with male literacy at 97.87% and female literacy at 84.49%. Cuttack ranks high in literacy rate among the top cities of India.

=== Religion (2011) ===
Religions in Cuttack
Religion	Percent
Hinduism	89.65%
Islam	8.23%
Christianity	1.35%
Others	0.65%
Others include Jainism, Sikhism and Buddhism

Around 89.65% of the city's population are Hindus, while Muslims account for 8.23%, and the rest constitute 2% of the total population. Cuttack has the largest population of Christians in the state.

=== Languages (2011) ===
Languages spoken in Cuttack (M), 2011
1. Odia (80.95%)
2. Urdu (6.89%)
3. Hindi (4.41%)
4. Bengali (2.97%)
5. Telugu (2.90%)
6. Others (1.88%)

Odia is the primary language used in the city, besides which English and Hindi may be spoken and understood. There are people who also speak Santali, Bengali, Marwari, Telugu, Gujarati, Punjabi, Urdu, etc. English is widely used for commercial purposes. Most of the banners are written in Odia and English .

== Civic administration ==
=== Municipal finance ===
According to financial data published on the CityFinance Portal of the Ministry of Housing and Urban Affairs, the Cuttack Municipal Corporation reported total revenue receipts of ₹211 crore (US$25 million) and total expenditure of ₹219 crore (US$26 million) in 2022–23. Tax revenue accounted for about 51.2% of the total revenue, while the corporation received ₹85 crore in grants during the financial year.

=== Political and municipal administration ===
The City of Cuttack is administered by the Cuttack Municipal Corporation. CMC was established as a municipality on 4 June 1876 and was named as a corporation on 15 August 1994. This corporation covers an area of 192.5 km^{2}. The CMC is in charge of the civic and infrastructure needs of the Metropolitan City. The Mayor heads the municipal corporation and the municipal commissioner is head of the executive arm. A municipal commissioner is an Indian Administrative Service (IAS) officer appointed by the state government. Subhash Chandra Singh is the first directly elected mayor of Cuttack and holds executive power in the Municipal Corporation.

Cuttack City is divided into three constituencies, which are represented at the State Legislative Assembly, viz., Barabati-Cuttack, Choudwar-Cuttack, and Cuttack Sadar.

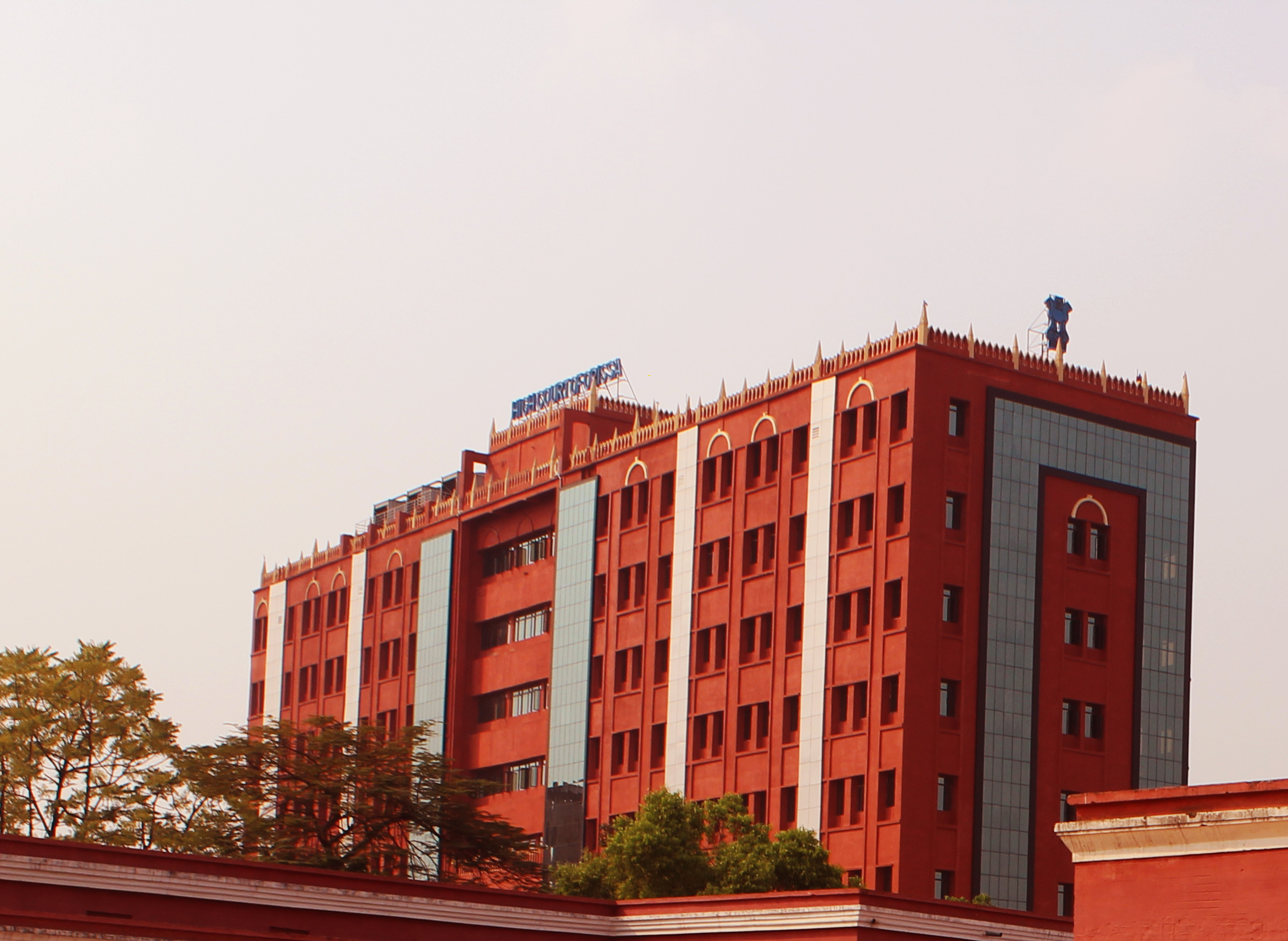
Odisha High Court from Ravenshaw Collegiate school

=== Police and judicial administration ===
The Bhubaneswar–Cuttack Police Commissionerate, under the control of the Commissioner of Police, looks after the law enforcement in Cuttack. Cuttack has 25 police stations in the city. The headquarters of the state police are situated in Cuttack. Cuttack is the judicial capital of Odisha, as the High Court is situated here. Apart from it, many other courts and tribunals have their offices in the city. Cuttack also houses a circle jail at Choudwar.

=== Utilities, NGOs and charitable organisations ===
Electricity is supplied by the state-operated Central Electricity Supply Utility of Odisha, or CESU. Fire services are handled by the state agency Odisha Fire Service. Drinking water is sourced from the underground wells and Mahanadi River. Water supply and sewerage are handled by the Public Health Engineering Organisation. State-owned Bharat Sanchar Nigam Limited, or BSNL, as well as private enterprises, among them Vodafone, Bharti Airtel, Jio, and Idea Cellular, are the leading telephone, cell phone, and Internet service providers in the city.

Cuttack has the largest number of NGOs, charitable organisations, orphanages, old age homes and destitute homes than anywhere else in the state.

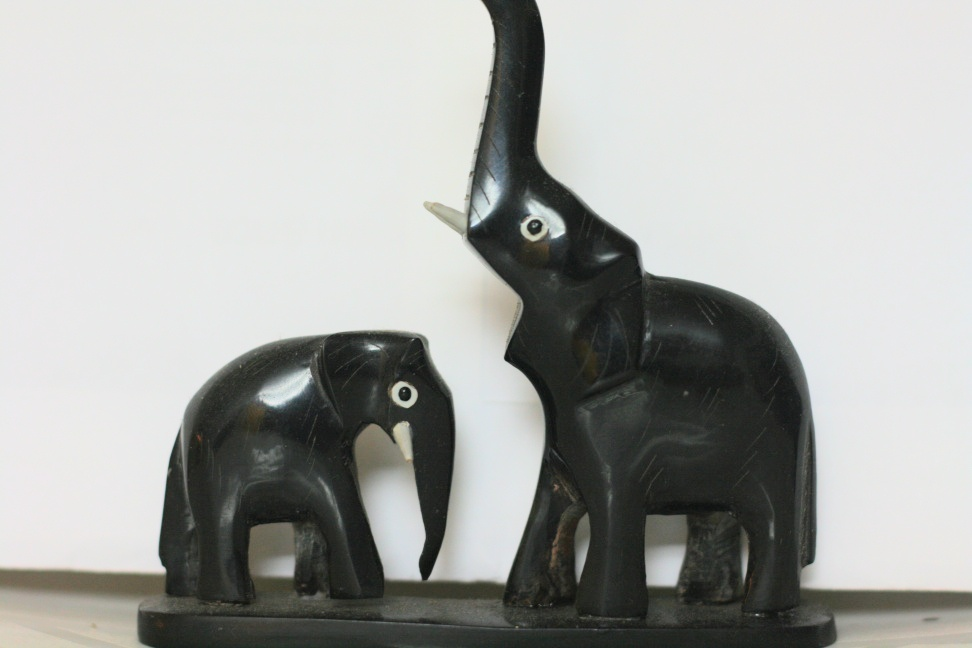
Traditional cow horn sculpture

== Economy ==
Cuttack is widely known as the commercial capital of Odisha. It is believed to have the largest GDP among all cities in Odisha due to its large business houses and a wide range of industries ranging from ferrous alloys, steel, and logistics to agriculture and traditional industries like textiles and handicrafts. There are many trading houses in the city renowned nationally and internationally. The Paradip Port, which is around 85 km from the city, facilitates this process.

=== Traditional industries ===
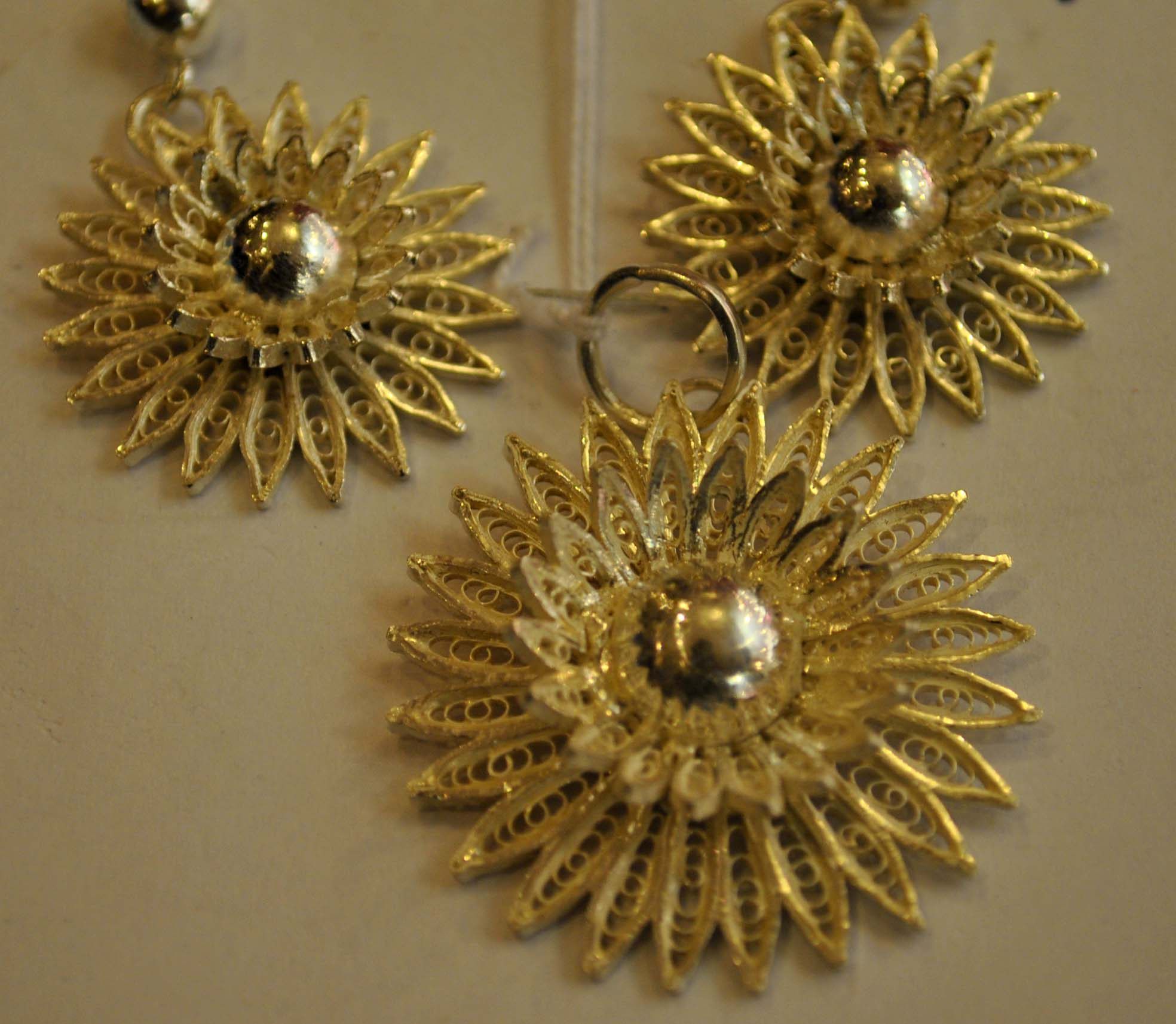
Tarakasi (Silver Filigree) Pendant and Ear rings

The city is one of the largest hubs for textiles in eastern India. The city's annual textile trade generates over a billion dollars of revenue. A large textile park is planned, giving a facelift to the erstwhile Orissa Textile Mills in the city outskirts. Cuttack is famous for its silver filigree works, and only because of these works it is also known as the silver city of India. Cuttack is also famous for its handicraft works using cows and mostly Buffalo horn. Cuttack has only one retail store for horn items named Utkal Gaurab Madhusudhan Horn Work. It was greatly contributed by the late Kalandi Charana Behera. Generally, the horn of dead cattle is used, and it is performed by licensed craftsmen only. This peculiar artefact is limited to Cuttack only, and anything of such kind is found nowhere else in the world. These fine and unique handicraft works add significantly to the local economy.

=== Industrial corridor and Special Economic Zone ===
There are 11 large-scale industries in and around Cuttack, mostly in Choudwar and Athagarh, and many more in the pipeline. These industries include steel, power, automobiles, alloys, and fireclay. Indian Metals & Ferro Alloys (IMFA), the country's largest producer of ferrous alloys, is in Choudwar, Cuttack. A mega-auto complex is in implementation stages on the city's outskirts. Cuttack occupies a very significant place in the logistics map of the country. The number of medium- and small-scale industries concentrated around Cuttack is by far the largest among the cities in the state. The industrial estates in and around Cuttack number around eight. Jagatpur and Khapuria are industrial estates inside the city. A large chunk of these serve as ancillary industries for the big industrial houses in Odisha and other states.

=== Service sector ===
Being the former capital and now the partial capital of the state and a big business hub, many central and state government and corporate offices are in Cuttack. The service sector is quite large. The people of nearby districts are heavily dependent on the city for their livelihood, contributing to the service sector and, thus, the floating population. The presence of National Rice Research Institute (NRRI), the largest rice research institute in Asia, adds to the importance of Cuttack in the agricultural map of the country. The presence of Odisha High Court and the SCB Medical & College, the largest medical institution in the state, further nourishes the service sector. Education is a major industry due to the large number of universities, colleges, schools, and coaching centres and caters to the neighbouring districts. The proximity to Paradip Port comes as an added advantage. OSL Group, one of the leading stevedore firms of the country, is headquartered in Cuttack. Cuttack, being the largest business hub of the state, is the nodal point of trade and transport. It also has the largest wholesale commodities market of the state at Malgodown, and Chhatra Bazaar caters to the whole state.

=== Media ===
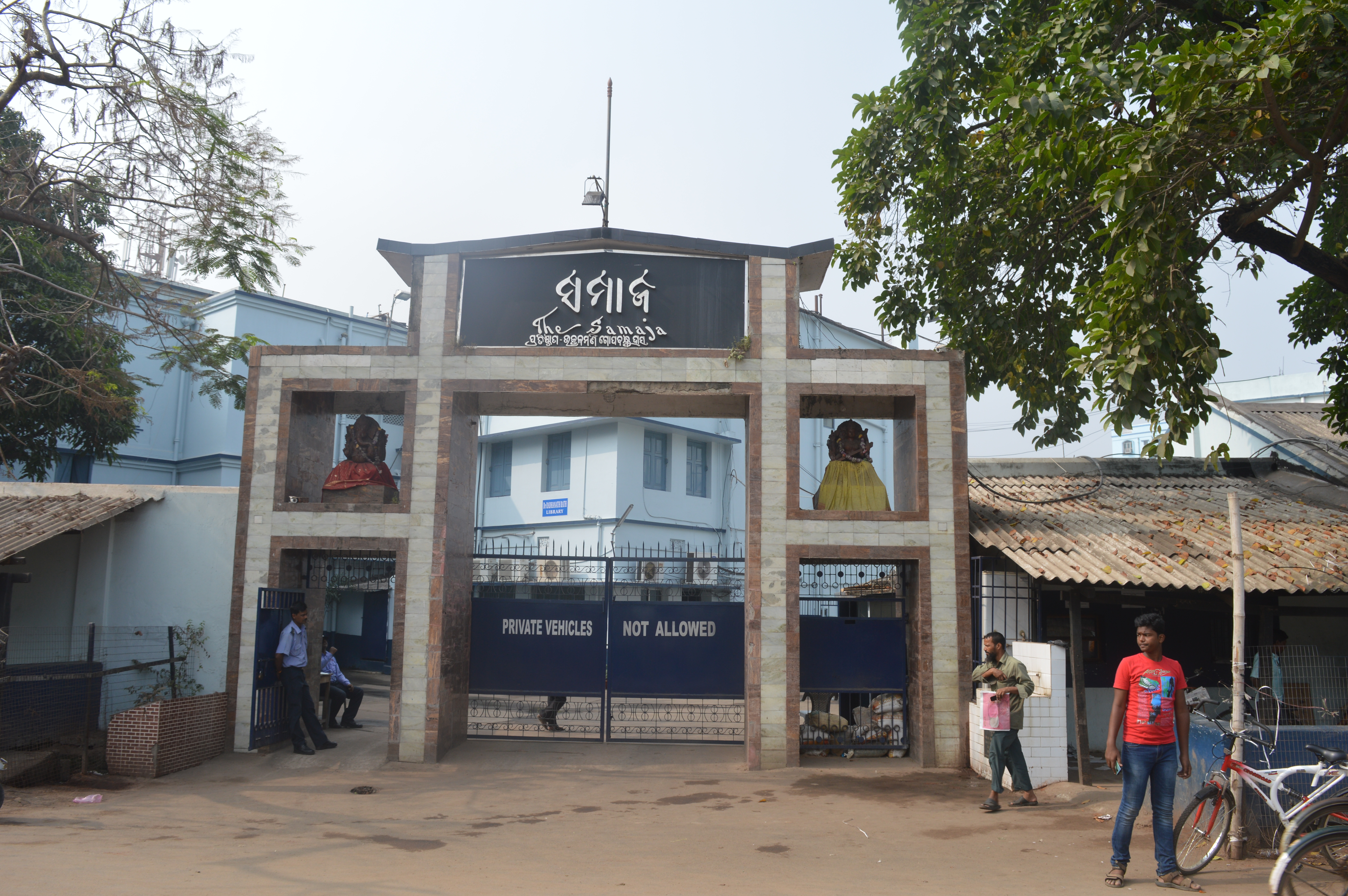
The Samaja Office

Cuttack has a Doordarshan centre that telecasts Odia programs. The Cuttack station of All India Radio started post-independence in 1948 and broadcasts programs in AM as well as FM bandwidth, catering to the whole state. At present, Cuttack has six local radio stations broadcasting on FM, including two from AIR. The private FM stations include 91.9 Sarthak FM, BIG 92.7 FM, RED 93.5 FM, and Radio Choklate 104 FM.

Among several print media houses located at Cuttack, Oriya newspapers published here include The Samaja (founded by Utkala Mani Gopabandhu Das), Prajatantra (founded by Harekrushna Mahatab, former Chief Minister of Odisha and former Governor of Maharashtra), Sambad, Dharitri, and the Matrubhasha.

== Healthcare ==
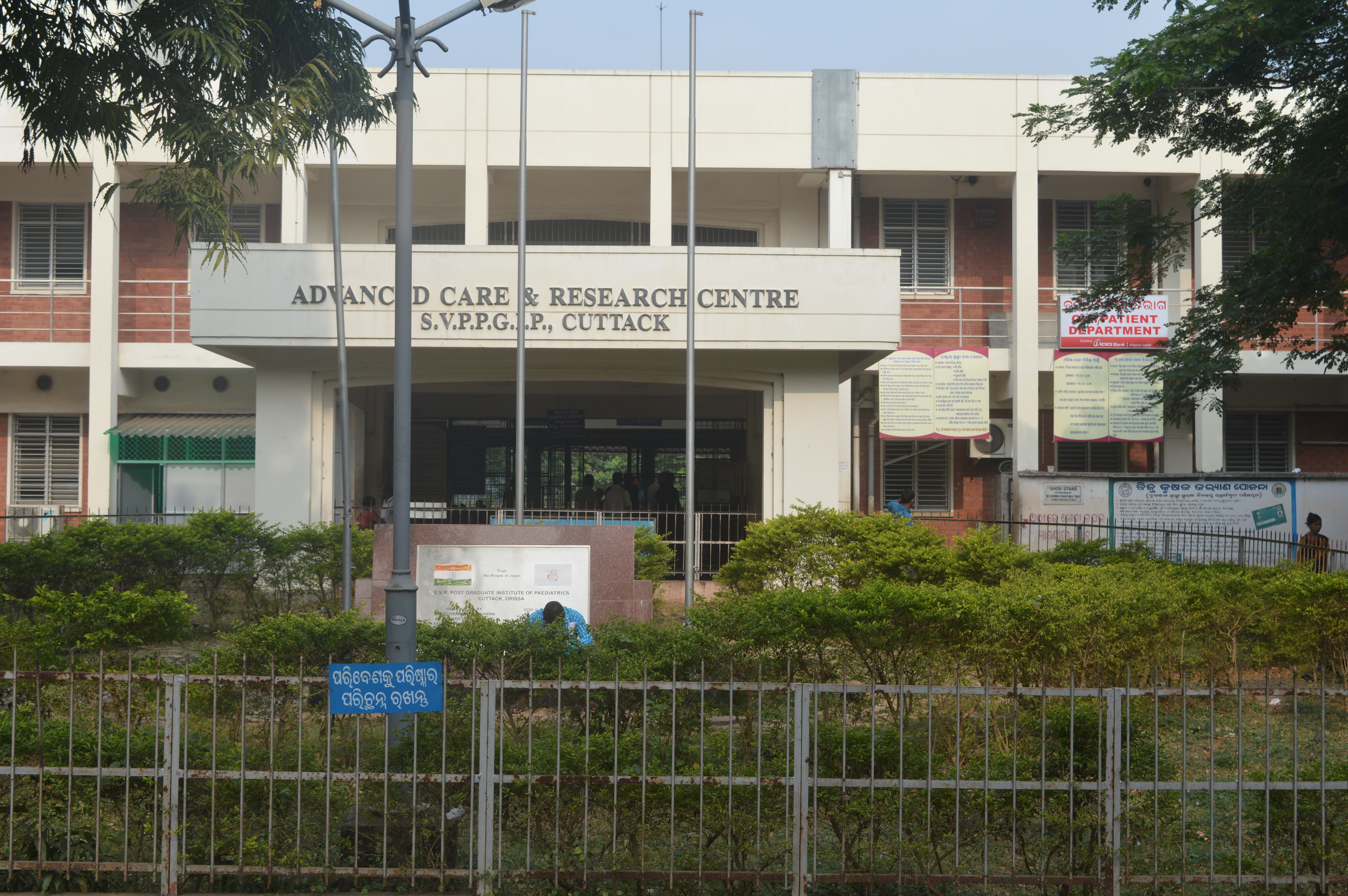
Sishu Bhawan Main Building

Cuttack is the healthcare hub of Odisha. Millions of people from different parts of Odisha and other states throng to the city with the hope of better medical facilities. Shri Ramachandra Bhanj Medical College (SCBMCH), the largest medical college of the state, is located in Cuttack. The Acharya Harihar Regional Cancer Centre (AHRCC), the only one of its kind in Eastern India, carries out high-end research and treatment in cancer. The Regional Spinal Injury Centre (RSIC) is also situated in the S.C.B. Medical College Campus, which provides rehabilitation measures to persons with disabilities, especially spinal injuries. Swami Vivekananda National Institute of Rehabilitation Training and Research (SVNIRTAR) is the most prestigious institution in the field of rehabilitation located at Olatpur, 30 km from Cuttack. Sardar Vallabhbhai Patel PG Institute of Paediatrics (SVPPIG), popularly known as Sishu Bhawan, is an annexe hospital of SCBMCH. It is the largest hospital of its kind in eastern India. Leprosy Home and Hospital near Nuabazar is over 100 years old and is still serving patients.

Major hospitals in and around Cuttack are District Headquarters Hospital (City Hospital), Shanti Memorial Hospital, HCG Panda Cancer Hospital, Ashwini Hospital, Sun Hospital, Sabarmati General Hospital, Dr. Agarwal's Eye Hospital, Heritage Healthcare Hospital, Dr. Chhirolya’s Nilakantha Brain Clinic, Rotary Eye Hospital, and Melvin Jones Lion's Eye Hospital, among others.

== Education ==
=== Schools and colleges in Cuttack ===
Schools in Cuttack are either run by the Cuttack Municipal Corporation or by private trusts and individuals. The Odia medium schools in Cuttack are affiliated to the Board of Secondary Education, Odisha whilst the English medium affiliated to either ICSE or the CBSE. Apart from English and Odia medium schools, certain Hindi, Urdu, Gujarati, Bengali and Telugu medium schools are also present in Cuttack. Ravenshaw Collegiate School, the oldest school of Odisha which proudly boasts many eminent personalities in its alumni including Netaji Subash Chandra Bose, Biju Patnaik, Harekrushna Mahatab, etc. Some of the other prominent Odia medium schools of the city include Secondary Board High School, Jobra High School, and Sri Aurobindo Institute of Higher Studies and Research, Matrubhaban.

The city has a number of Saraswati Shishu Mandirs and CBSE schools. The prominent public schools are Sai International Residential School (SIRS), D.A.V. Public School, Sector-6, CDA, Jawahar Navodaya Vidyalaya, Kendriya Vidyalaya No.1, Kendriya Vidyalaya No.2, Kendriya Vidyalaya No.3, Kendriya Vidyalaya Arc Charbatia, and Stewart School. Netaji Subhas Chandra Bose studied at Stewart School briefly before moving to Ravenshaw Collegiate School.

Under the 10+2+3/4 plan, students complete ten years of schooling and then enroll for two years in junior college, where they select one of three streams: arts, commerce, or science. This is followed by either a general degree course in a chosen field of study, or a professional degree course, such as law, engineering, and medicine. Most of the colleges in the city are affiliated to the Council of Higher Secondary Education. Some of the prominent colleges include Ravenshaw College, Choudwar College, Cuttack College, Netaji City College, Raghunathjew College, Sailabala Women's College, Emarti Devi Women's College, Indira Gandhi Women's College, Sri Aurobindo School Of New Thought, City Women's College, Sri Aurobindo Institute of Higher Studies & Research Matrubhaban, Kishore Nagar College, Kandarpur College. Sailabala Women's College, established in 1913 is the oldest women's college in Odisha.

=== Universities and institutes of higher education and research ===
The Twin Cities account for around 100 engineering colleges. Cuttack is home to several technical institutions which include Institute of Management and Information Technology (IMIT), Bhubananda Orissa school of Engineering(BOSE), Institute of Textile Technology (ITT), Dhaneshwar Rath Institute of Engineering & Management Studies (DRIEMS), Image Institute of Technology & Management (IITM), Ajay Binay Institute of Technology (ABIT), Institute of Professional Studies and Research (IPSAR), Jagannath Institute of Engineering and Technology, Barabati Institute of Management Studies etc. Some of the other institutes include Biju Pattnaik Institute of Film and Television and the Madhusudan Law College. Madhusudan Law college has been declared to be upgraded as a university.

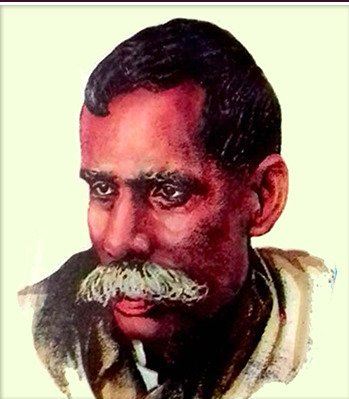
Portrait of Radhanath Ray

Established in 1869 as Cuttack Normal School, converted to Cuttack Training School in 1875 and later in 1923 as Secondary Training School, later renamed as Radhanath Training School, after the eminent teacher and poet Radhanath Ray, now known as Radhanatha Institute of Advanced Studies in Education (RNIASE) offers various teaching Courses, is located adjacent to the campus wall of Ravenshaw Collegiate School and in front of Swaraj Asrama in Bakharabad is the oldest institute in the State. Also in 1912, Odisha's only Urdu teacher training school was established in Sheikh Bazar Which is now only the Muslim Minority Govt Elementary Teacher Education Institution in Odisha where every year 100 pupil teachers complete their elementary teacher training.

==== National Law University Odisha (NLUO) ====
Cuttack is the home to the National Law University Odisha, one of the 14 NLU's in India, which was established under the National Law University Odisha Act of 2008, the National Law University(NLU Cuttack). It is one of the institutes for legal education in India funded by the Central as well as the State government. Housed in a sprawling campus the university sees a host of legal luminaries who impart education to the students.

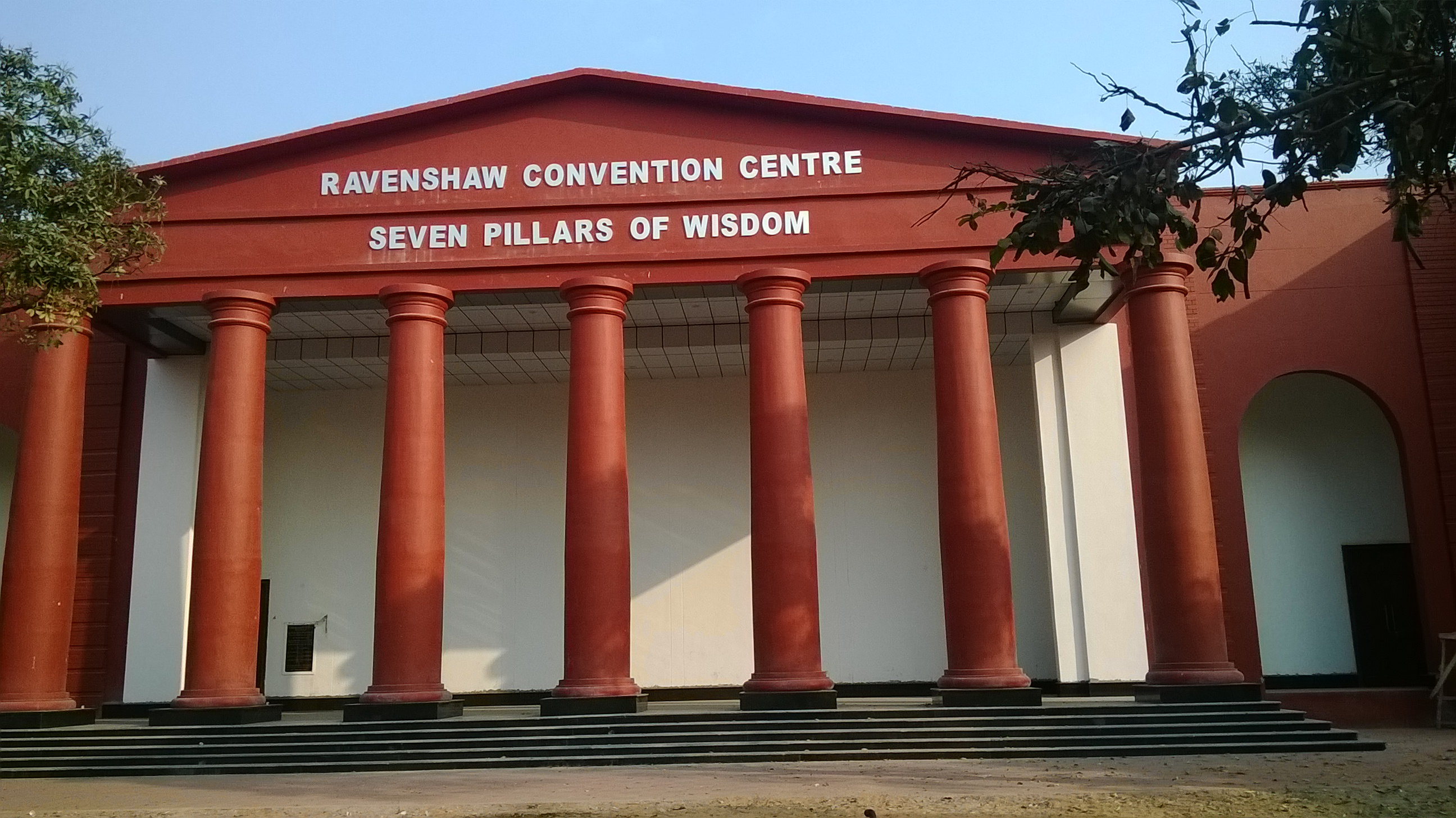
Ravenshaw Seven Pillars of Wisdom

==== Madhusudan Law University (MLU) ====
Cuttack houses Odisha's oldest law college, Madhusudan Law College. In 1869 the law course was introduced in the Ravenshaw Collegiate School, thereafter it continued in the Ravenshaw College. That time the Bachelor of Law course was under the University of Calcutta and after the foundation of Utkal University in 1943 the Madhusudan Law College was also established in the same year. This college is named after National Leader and politician Madhusudan Das. With effect from June 2020, Madhusudan Law College has been upgraded to Madhusudan Law University. As per the notification from DHE Odisha, "[a]ll the existing government and private law colleges, except the constituent law colleges of different universities of the state shall be affiliated and cease to be affiliated from their respective universities from that date and direct that the said University shall have jurisdiction, save as aforesaid, over all law colleges of the state."

==== Ravenshaw University ====
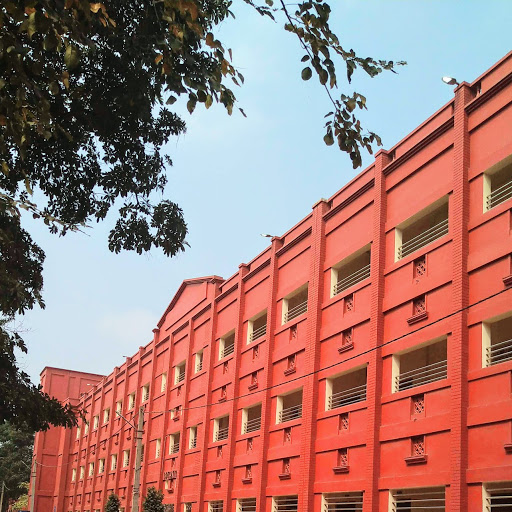
Ravenshaw University

Ravenshaw University is one of the oldest institutes of India and the oldest college of the state which was founded by Thomas Edward Ravenshaw in 1868 and was granted University status on 15 November 2006. Ravenshaw University came into existence on 15 November 2006. It was an up-gradation of Ravenshaw College established in 1868, one of the oldest and largest colleges in India which subsequently became an autonomous college with CPE status by UGC and 'A' grade by NAAC.

==== Sri Sri University ====
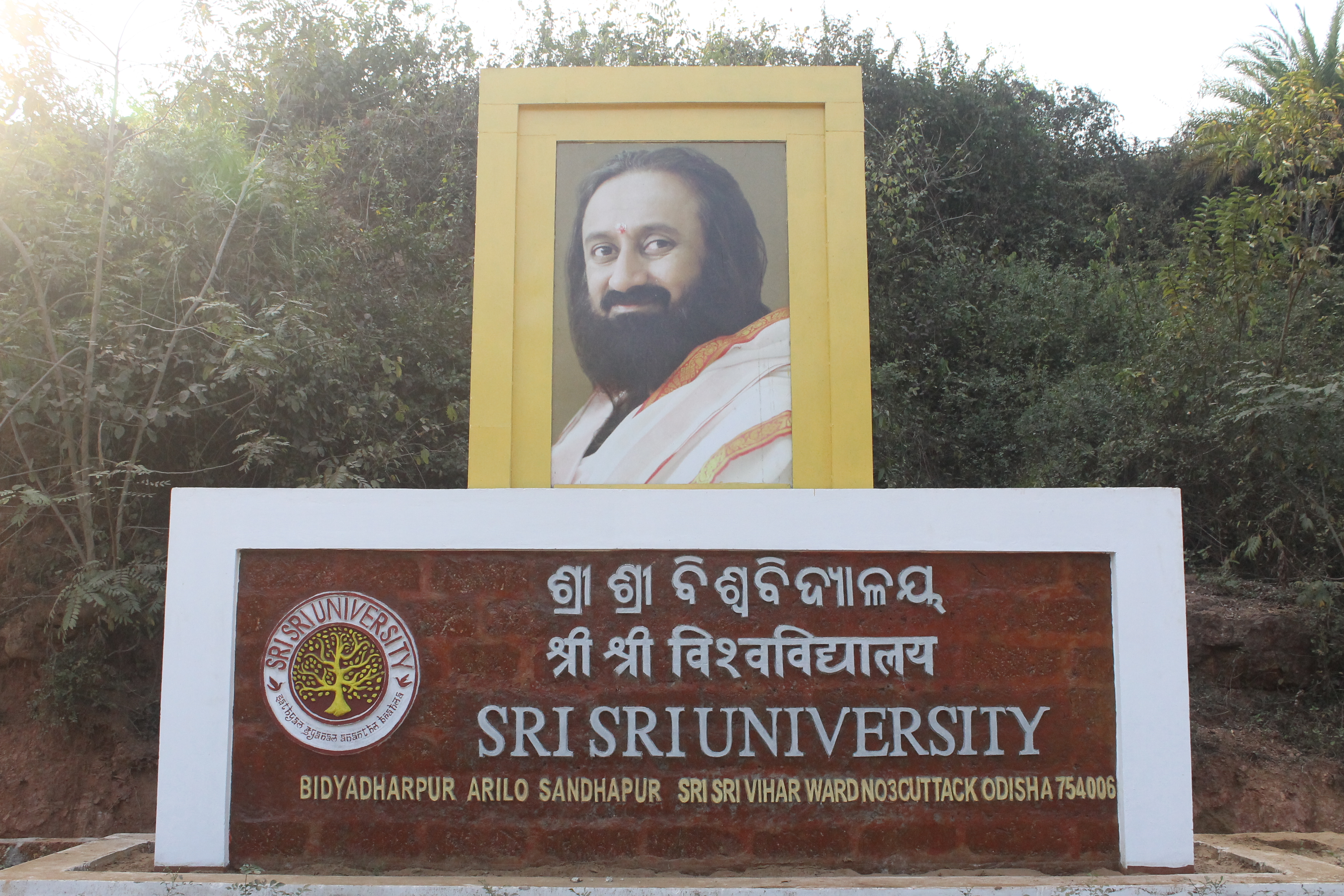
Sri Sri University at Naraj

Sri Sri University established by Sri Sri Ravi Shankar and Art of Living is situated at the far end of the city in Naraj. It came into operation in the year 2012.

==== National Rice Research Institute (NRRI) ====
Asia's largest rice research institute, the Central Rice Research Institute (CRRI) is situated in Cuttack. In 1945, the Government of India decided to establish a central Institute for rice research. As a result, the Central Rice Research Institute (CRRI) was set up on 23 April 1946 at Bidhyadharpur, Cuttack, Odisha with an experimental farmland of 60 hectares provided by Government of Orissa. The CRRI is one of the Institutes of the ICAR under the Division of Crop Sciences. The institute has two research stations- Central Rainfed Upland Rice Research Station (CRURRS), Hazaribagh, in Jharkhand, and the Regional Rainfed Lowland Rice Research Station (RRLRRS), Gerua, in Assam. These research stations were established to tackle the problems of rainfed uplands, and flood-prone rainfed lowlands, respectively. Two Krishi Vigyan Kendras (KVKs) also function under the CRRI and guided by the DDG (Agril. Extension). These KVKs are located at Santhapur, Cuttack and Jainagar, Koderma.

==== Srirama Chandra Bhanja Medical College and Hospital (SCBMCH) ====
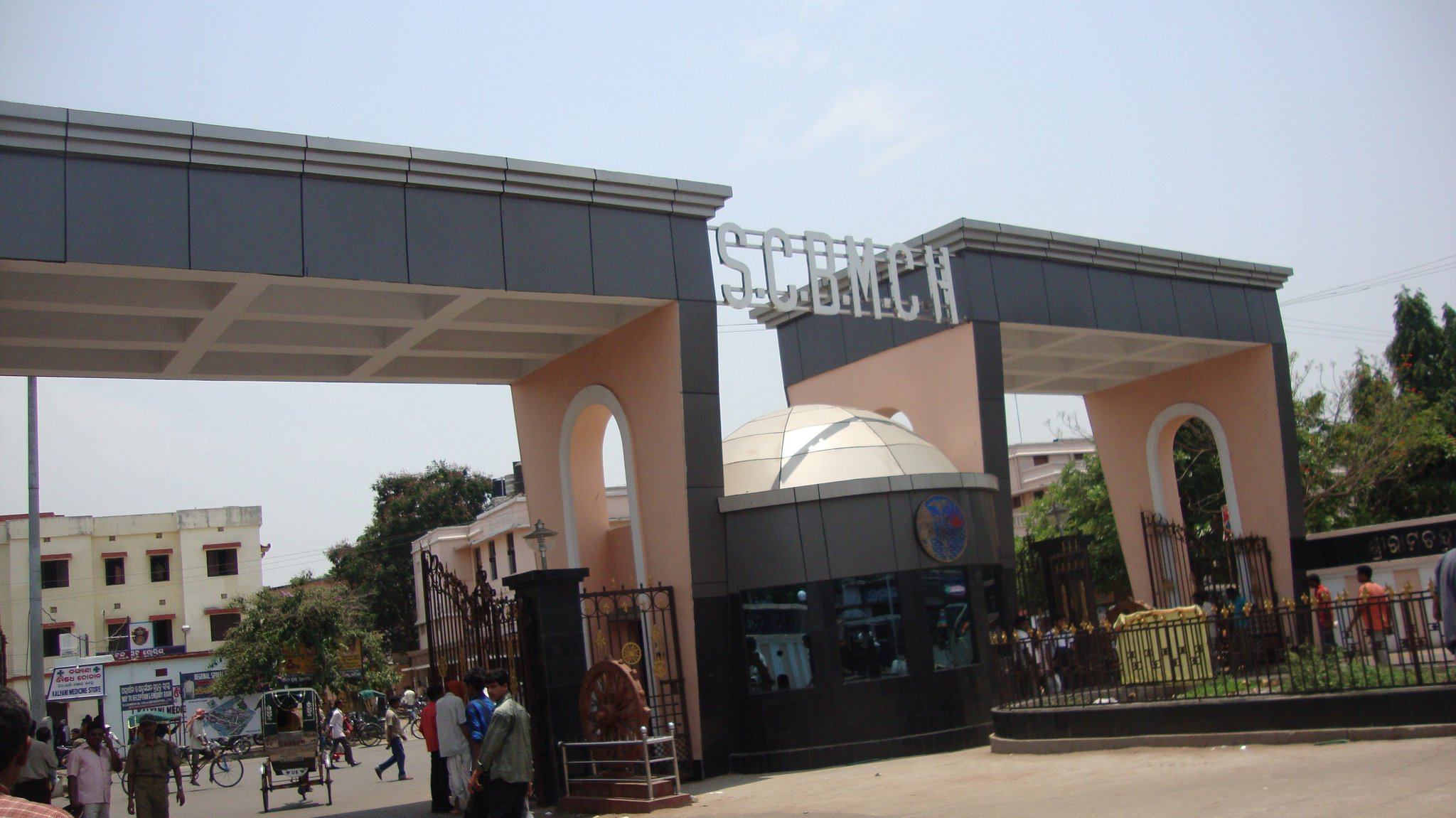
SCB medical college & hospital entrance gate

Shri Ramachandra Bhanj Medical College (SCB), the largest medical college of the state is located in Cuttack. The S.C.B. Medical College also has a dental wing which offers bachelor's degree in dental sciences. Acharya Harihar Regional Cancer Centre (AHRCC), the only one of its kind in Eastern India, carries out high-end research and treatment in cancer. The Regional Spinal Injury Centre (RSIC) is also situated in the S.C.B. Medical College Campus. RSIC is an autonomous organisation under the administrative and financial control of Department of Health & Family Welfare, Government of Odisha and is headed by the director of the RSIC which provides rehabilitation measures to persons with disabilities especially spinal injury.

==== Swami Vivekananda National Institute of Rehabilitation Training and Research (SVNIRTAR) ====
Svnitar is an institute in the field of rehabilitation. Swami Vivekanand National Institute of Rehabilitation Training and Research (SVNIRTAR) is an Autonomous body under Department of Empowerment of Persons with Disabilities (DIVYANGJAN), Ministry of Social Justice and Empowerment, Govt. of India. It provides total medical rehabilitation for the Persons with Locomotor Disabilities. It also conducts three bachelor's degree courses in Physiotherapy, Occupational Therapy, Prosthetics and Orthotics, three Postgraduate courses of Physiotherapy, Occupational Therapy and Prosthetics and Orthotics affiliated to Utkal University, Bhubaneswar. It also has an accreditation for DNB in Physical Medicine and Rehabilitation of National Board of Examination (NBE), New Delhi.

==== Sardar Vallabhbahai Patel Post Graduate Institute of Paediatrics (SVPPGIP) ====
SVPPGIP also known as Shishu Bhawan is the largest Paediatrics hospital in eastern India. Sardar Vallabhbhai Patel Post Graduate Institute of Paediatrics (Sishubhawan), Cuttack, Orissa is based on manifold historic backgrounds situated on the bank of river Kathjori amidst the lush greenery. This palatial building was the centre of administration during Mugul, Maratha and British regime from 1568 A.D. till independence. After independence this building was known as "Rajbhawan" where Governor of Orissa used to stay.

==== Biju Pattnaik Film and Television Institute of Odisha (BPFTIO) ====
The government of Odisha has established an autonomous Institute in the name and style of Biju Pattnaik Film & Television Institute of Orissa (BPFTIO) under World Bank assisted scheme to meet the emerging demand of well trained technical manpower in the field of television network and film production activities. Situated on the bank of river Mahanadi, BPFTIO occupies an independent space in the sprawling campus of Bhubanananda Orissa School of Engineering (BOSE), Cuttack the oldest Engineering School of the State. Funded by Government of Odisha, Department of Employment and Technical Education & Training, the institute offers diploma courses in 3 disciplines such as Cinematography, Sound & TV. Engineering and Film & Video Editing.

== Transport ==
=== Air ===
Cuttack has an air base named Charbatia Air Base for the exclusive use for light exercises and on and off training purposes of the Indian Air Force. The nearest commercial airport is the Biju Patnaik International Airport at Bhubaneswar, about 28 km away but the establishment of an airport in Cuttack, at Choudwar or Naraj to serve such a large population in and around the city is needed.

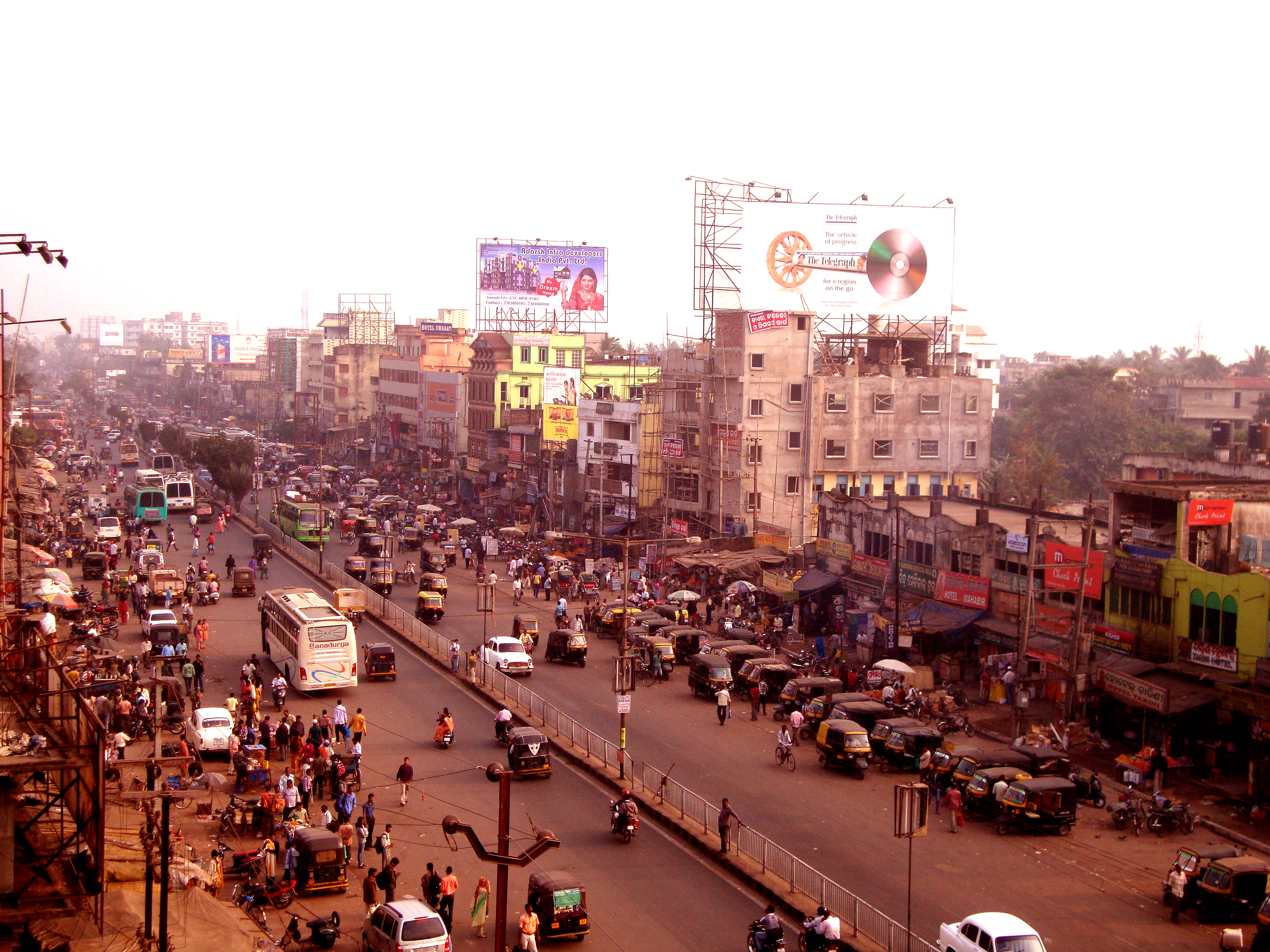
Badambadi Bus Stand

=== Road ===
On 28 April 2010, the Ministry of Road Transport and Highways officially published a new numbering system for the National highway network in the Gazette of the Government of India. As per the new numbering National Highway 16 (former National Highway 5) runs from North to South of the city. As a part of the Golden Quadrilateral project, this highway runs from Chennai to Kolkata. National Highway 55 (former National Highway 42) connects Cuttack with Sambalpur. Also Asian Highway 45 passes through the city. Feeder State Highways connect Cuttack to Jajpur, Paradeep, Talcher, Angul, Kendrapara and nearby towns in Cuttack district. Intra city transport is primarily through Auto rickshaws. From two decades, DTS city buses ply in the city to join different places in the city and the state capital. Cuttack is a major junction connecting all the major parts of the state. The bus terminus at Cuttack is located at Badambadi, and is one of the largest bus terminus in India, and thousands of private and government buses ply to hundreds of destinations every day. A new inter-state bus terminus (ISBT) at Balikuda is under construction to relieve pressure off the Badambadi Bus Terminus. Cuttack is now more strongly connected to Bhubaneswar and Dhenkanal due to the addition of two new bridges namely Netaji Subhas Chandra Bose Setu on Kathjodi and Utkal Gourab Madhusudan Setu on Mahanadi. The former is the longest road bridge in Odisha.

Cuttack Netaji Bus Terminal, is a hi-tech bus stand which has been built over 14.95 acres of land in Khannagar. The three-storey bus terminal building offers numerous facilities including state of art kiosks, a luxurious Aahar kendra (where passengers can have wholesome meal for Rs.5), dormitories and more. The bus terminal is named after the illustrious son of Odisha, Netaji Subhas Chandra Bose. It was built in the record time of 2 and a half years and was inaugurated by former Chief Minister of Odisha, Naveen Patnaik, on 16 September 2023.

=== Rail ===
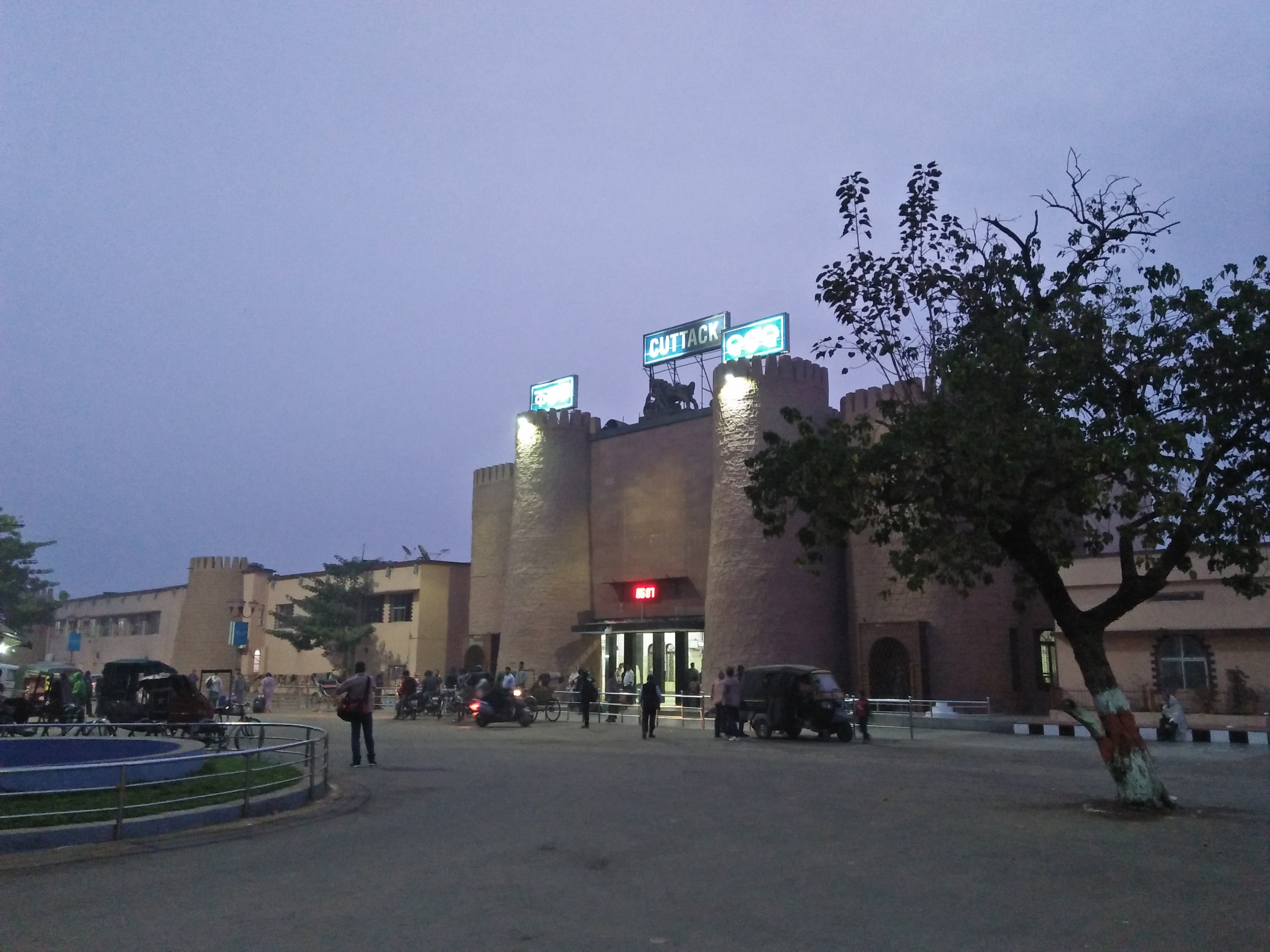
Cuttack Junction Railway Station

Cuttack Junction is one of the stations on the Howrah-Chennai main line of the East Coast Railway and falls under the Khurda Road division. A branch line to Paradeep starts from Cuttack. It is connected to all parts of India through trains run by the Indian Railways. The Cuttack Railway station is selected to be developed as a multi-functional railway station with food courts shopping plaza, theatres to be developed . Other railway stations in the city are Barang Junction railway station, Balikuda, Matagajpur, Kandarpur, Katha Jori, Kendrapara Road, Kapilas Road, Manguli, Nergundi and Naraj. The Mahanadi Rail bridge is the 5th longest rail bridge in India.

=== Mass Rapid Transit System (MRTS) ===
The Government of Odisha has proposed a rapid transit system for the cities of Cuttack and Bhuabneswar. On 23 August 2014, Government of Odisha's Housing and Urban Development Department signed a Memorandum of Understanding with Balaji Railroad Systems Ltd (BARSYL) for preparation of a detailed project report (DPR) for mass rapid transit system (MRTS) between Cuttack and Bhubaneswar. The Balaji Railroad Systems Ltd (BARSYL) would get Rs 25 million for preparation of DPR for approximately 30 km within a period of ten months. The government officials said it would be a testing for them to evict encroachments for expansion of roads in the twin cities.

The Government of Odisha is working on introduction of MEMU service in Cuttack. The Housing and Urban Development Department has taken up the issue for exploring Monorail system in Cuttack to make it the first city in the state to have MEMU service. A study on the viability of launching the monorail over an eight to 10 km stretch in the city is expected to be carried out soon. The Engineering Projects (India) Ltd would conduct a comprehensive survey of the city's capacity to host the system as well as the traffic and congestion problems and submit a proposal. The initially proposed route of circular Ring Road has been ruled out as it was not considered feasible on traffic considerations. While Badambadi-Madhupatana Link Road stretch is the most congested with traffic density crossing 300 per minute, thoroughfares like Choudhury Bazar College Square, Mangalabag, Buxi Bazaar, Chandni Chowk, CDA Square see peak flow of over 100 vehicles per minute are more likely to be taken into consideration.

== Sports ==
Cuttack is the sports hub of Odisha. It is the host to the famous Barabati Stadium as well as many other stadium and grounds. Cuttack has a branch of Sports Authority of India (SAI) training centres, which was established on 26 March 1987 under Sports Hostel Scheme in the Barabati Sports Complex. The authority is responsible for training in Athletics, Basketball, Football, Volleyball, and Gymnastics.

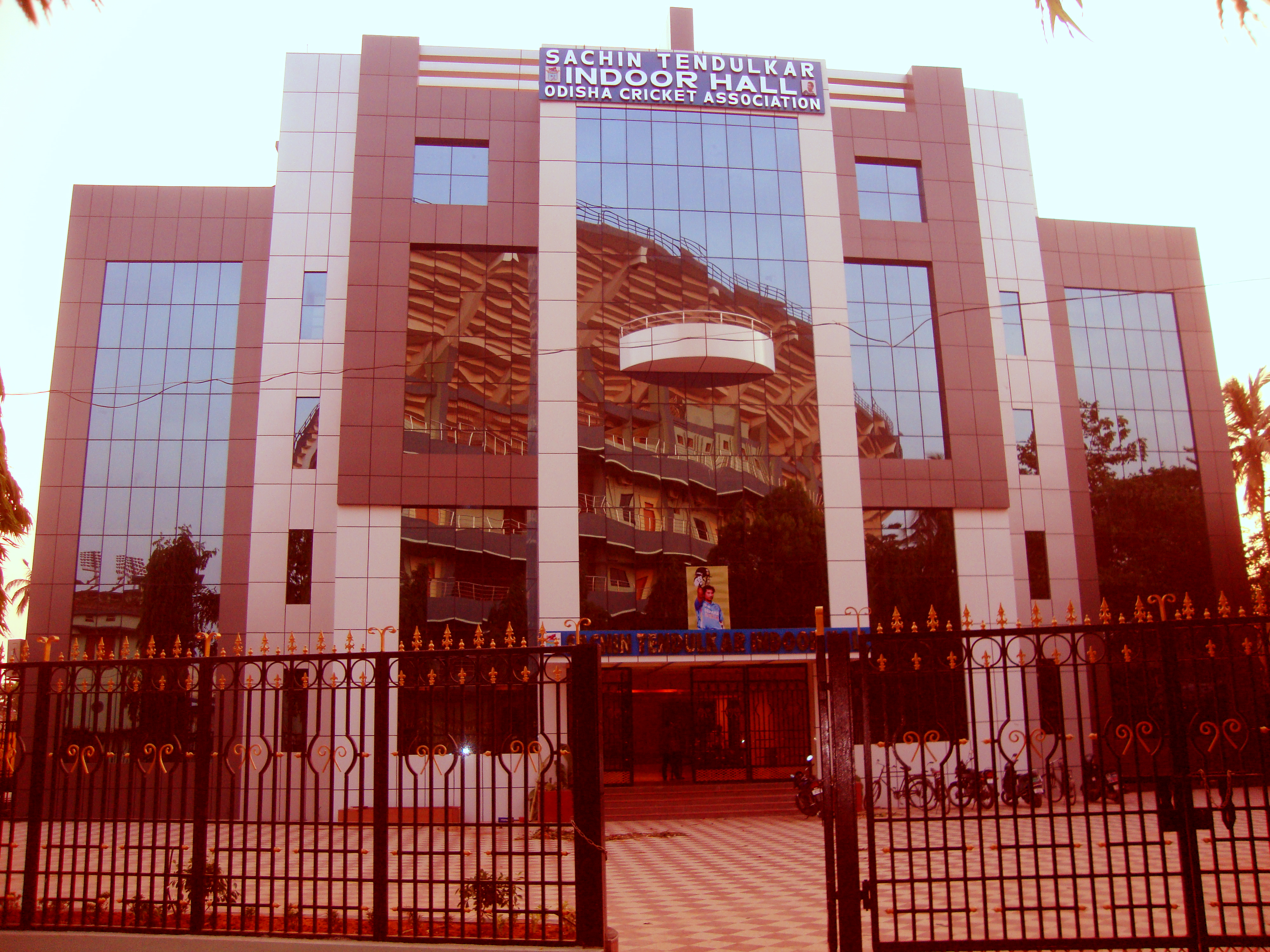
Sachin Tendulkar Indoor Hall

=== Barabati Sports Complex ===
Cuttack is the home to the Barabati Sports Complex. The Barabati Stadium is an important venue for international cricket and football matches. The Barabati Sports Complex hosts the head offices of most of the sports bodies of the state. Apart from cricket and football, the sports complex also has facilities for Lawn Tennis, Basketball, Volleyball, Swimming. The sports complex also houses an indoor hall christened as Sachin Tendulkar Indoor Hall, dedicated to legendary cricketer Sachin Tendulkar. The construction of the indoor hall was a joint venture of the Odisha Cricket Association and the Board of Control for Cricket in India which was formally inaugurated on the auspicious occasion of Utkal Divas. The centrally air-conditioned 185 feet long, 65 feet wide and 44 feet high four-storied complex has been built primarily to provide practise facility to cricketers during off season. The complex is also used to stage competitions in different indoor sports including basketball, volleyball, badminton, table tennis, fencing, judo, weight-lifting and wrestling.

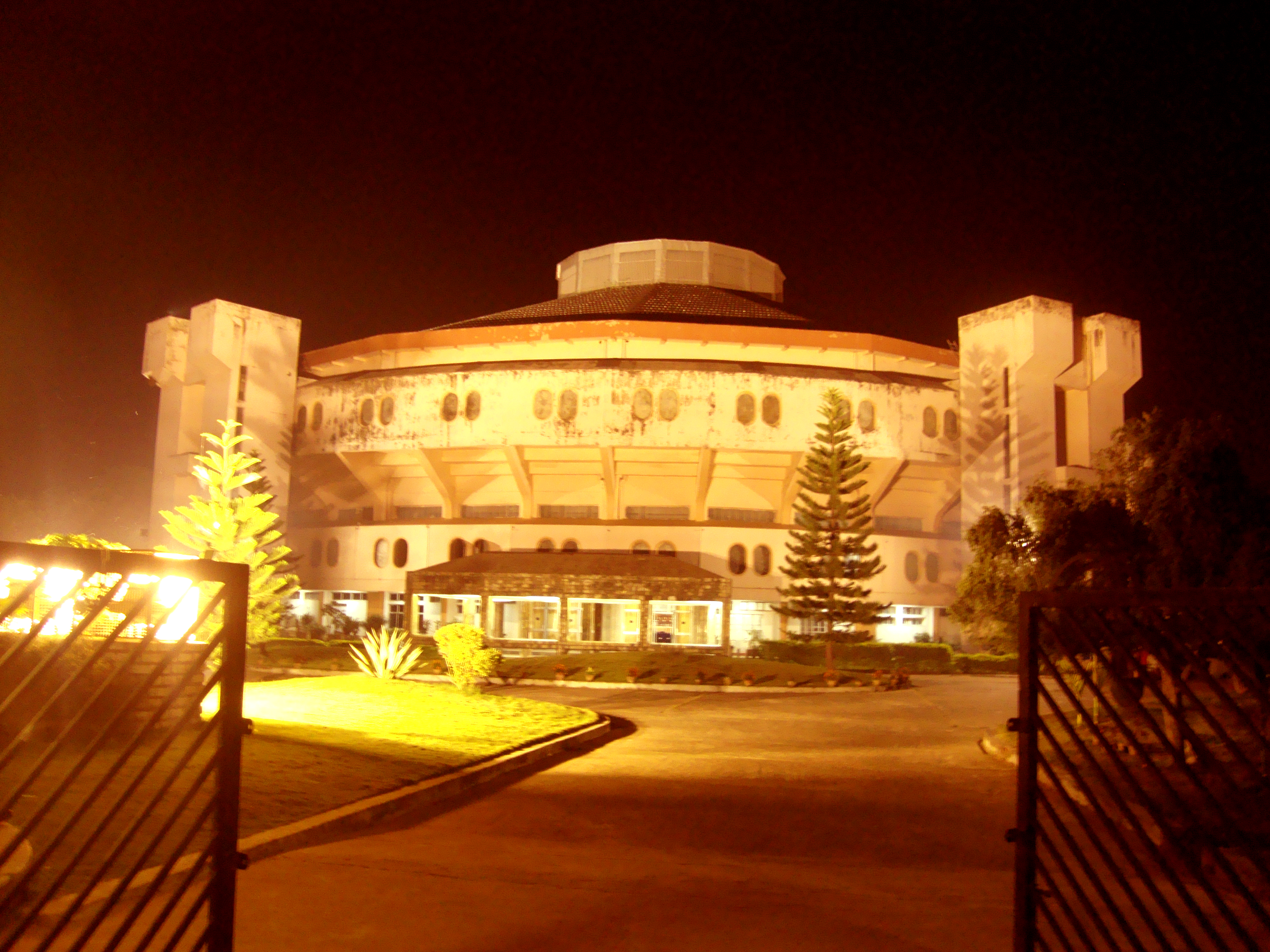
Jawaharlal Nehru Indoor Stadium

=== Jawaharlal Nehru Indoor Stadium ===
East India's second and Odisha's only indoor arena, Jawaharlal Nehru Indoor Stadium is situated in Cuttack. The indoor arena is primarily used for Gymnastics and Martial Arts. It has hosted many international and national sporting events in the past. It is also used to host musical concerts and award shows. It hosted the 21st edition of the Commonwealth Table Tennis Championships from 17 to 21 July 2019. It will host the BWF World Tour tournament Odisha Open from 2022 Onwards.

=== Satyabrata Stadium ===
This is situated inside the fort area and is primarily used for athletics and soccer. It has a concrete track used for athletics and synthetic basketball courts. It is used by the locals for jogging and morning exercises too.

=== Jagatpur Water Sports Complex ===
Cuttack is also the only hub in Odisha for water sports. The Rowing & Sculling Association of Odisha is situated in Cuttack at Jagatpur. The water sports events are facilitated in the River Birupa.

The DRIEMS Stadium at Tangi has also hosted international cricket matches and is a regular venue for Ranji Trophy matches. Cuttack also has many other sporting grounds like Nimpur Grounds, Bidanasi Grounds, Sunshine Grounds, Ravenshaw Grounds, SCB Medical Grounds, BOSE Grounds which are the venues for annual state cricket and football championships and some of which are often used as additional venues for Ranji Trophy and Santosh Trophy matches.

Cuttack along with Mumbai has hosted the 2013 Women's Cricket World Cup. Apart from it, Cuttack has also hosted matches in 1987 Cricket World Cup and 1996 Cricket World Cup. The 18th and 24th National Games were held in Cuttack in 1958 and 1970 respectively.

== Historical places of interest ==
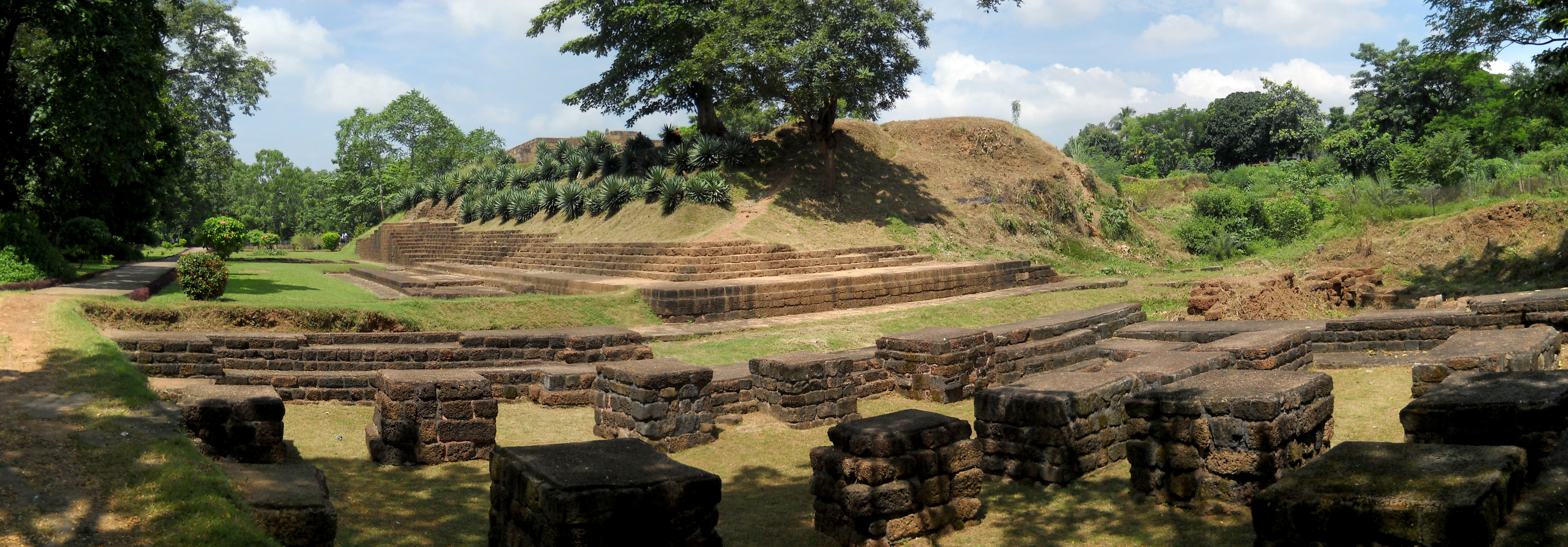
Barabati Fort ruins of nine-storied palace complex

=== Barabati Fort and Cantonment ===
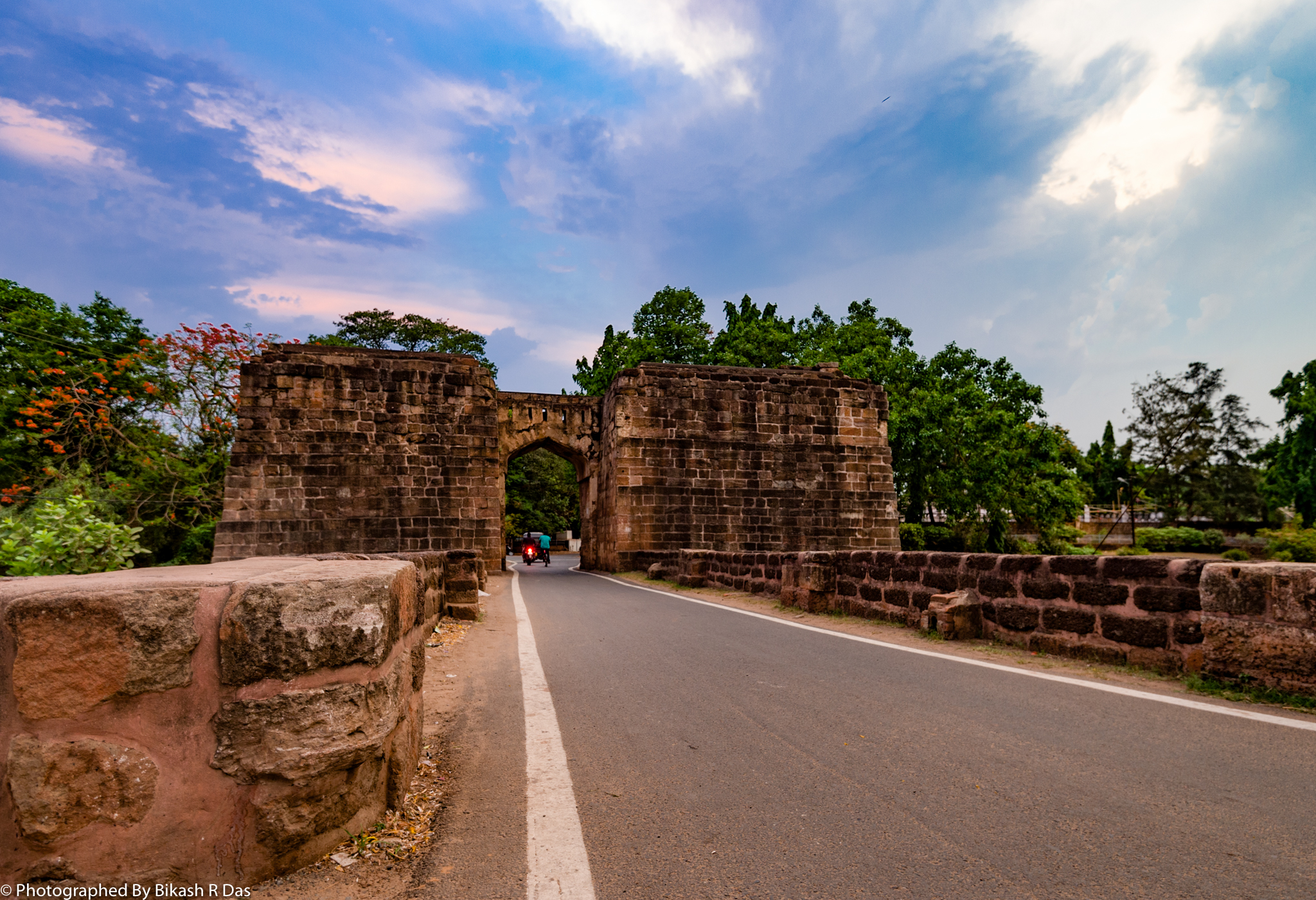
Barabati Fort arched gate over the moat is a symbol of Cuttack

The Barabati Fort is a 10th-century castle built by the Somavamshi dynasty lineage ruler Maharaja Markata Keshari. The ruins of the fort still remain with its moat, gate and the earthen mound of the nine-storied palace, which evokes the memories of past days. The ruins of the fort still remain on the right bank of the Mahanadi, in the western part of the city with its moat, gate and the earthen mound of the nine-storied palace, which evokes the memories of past days.

=== 9, Pithapur , Cuttack ===
This address has stood since the year 1904. In 1932 this was the HQ of India’s Freedom Struggle Martyr Legendary revolutionary Shri. Bhagabati Charan Panigrahi . In 1972 this was the HQ of the then Chief Minister of Orissa Legendary Smt. Nandini Satpathy . Ever since 2022 this has been serving as the HQ of SNSMT Chairman and noted socio-political leader Shri. Suparno Satpathy.

=== Chudangagarh Fort ===
Chudangagarh otherwise called Sarangagarh is located near the Barang Junction railway station and is 8 km. south-west of Cuttack city on a fair-weather road. Like Barabati Fort this fort also played a significant role in the medieval history of Orissa. Chodagandadeva of Ganga dynasty selected this site and built the fort for effective safeguard of his vast empire. Remains of fort walls, stepped wells, dilapidated temples, tanks with stone revetments, granary house, watch towers and dressed stones are abundantly noticed within the fortified area. A ruined palace containing sixteen rooms called Solapura Uasa is located inside the fort. The granary of the fort is indicated at a place called Chaula Ghara Banks. Chudangagarh is now a protected monument of the Archaeological Survey of India, New Delhi.

=== Netaji Birth Place Museum ===
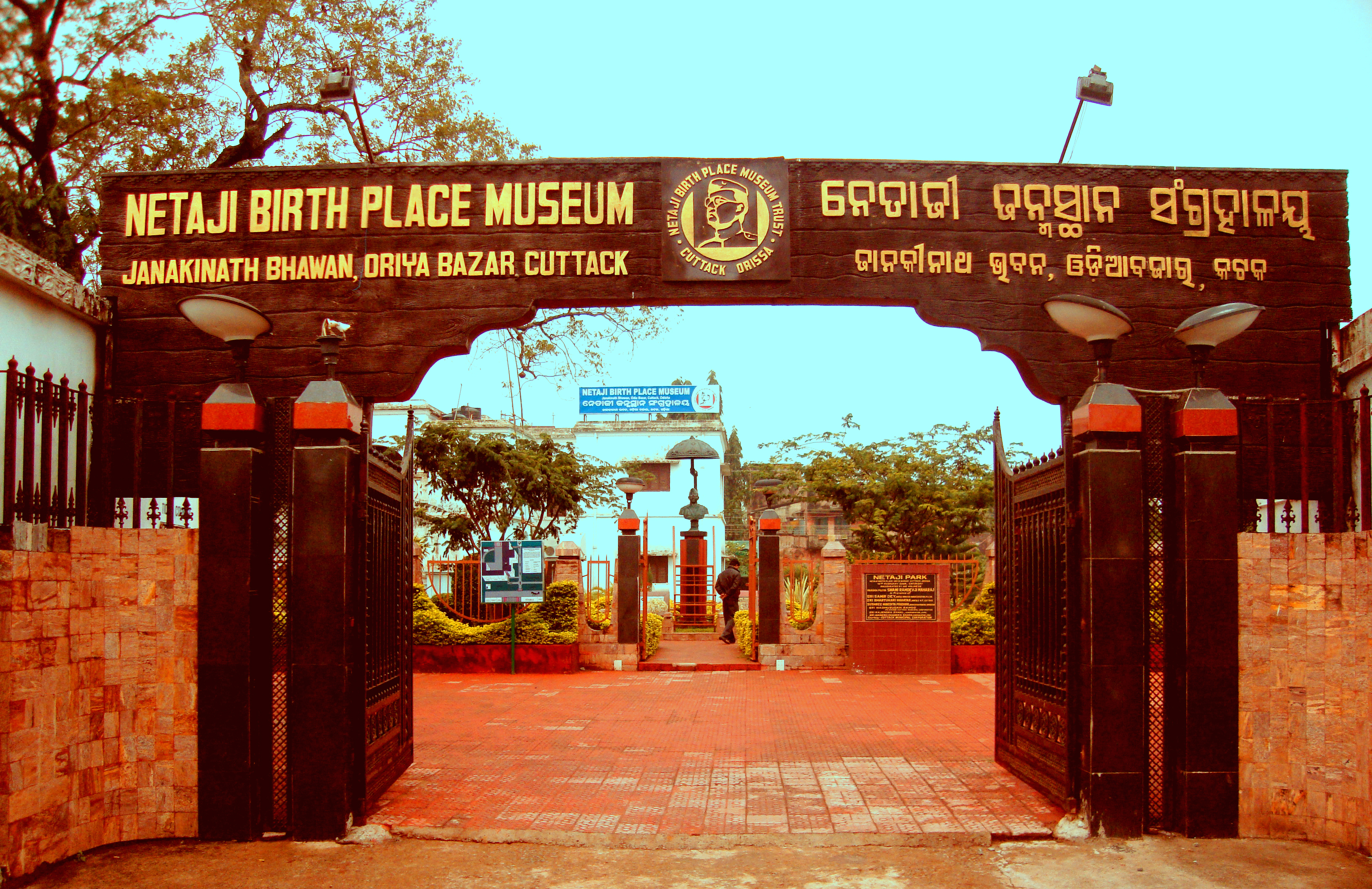
Netaji Subhash Chandra Bose Birth Place Museum

Cuttack takes pride in being the birthplace of Netaji Subhas Chandra Bose, the prominent Indian freedom-fighter and founder of Azad Hind Fauj. The birthplace of Netaji is situated in Oriya Bazar known as Janakinath Bhawan, behind Big Bazaar. The place has now been converted into a museum named Netaji Birth Place Museum. The museum showcases the original letters written by Netaji along with other important materials used by Netaji.

=== Madhusudan Sangrahalaya ===
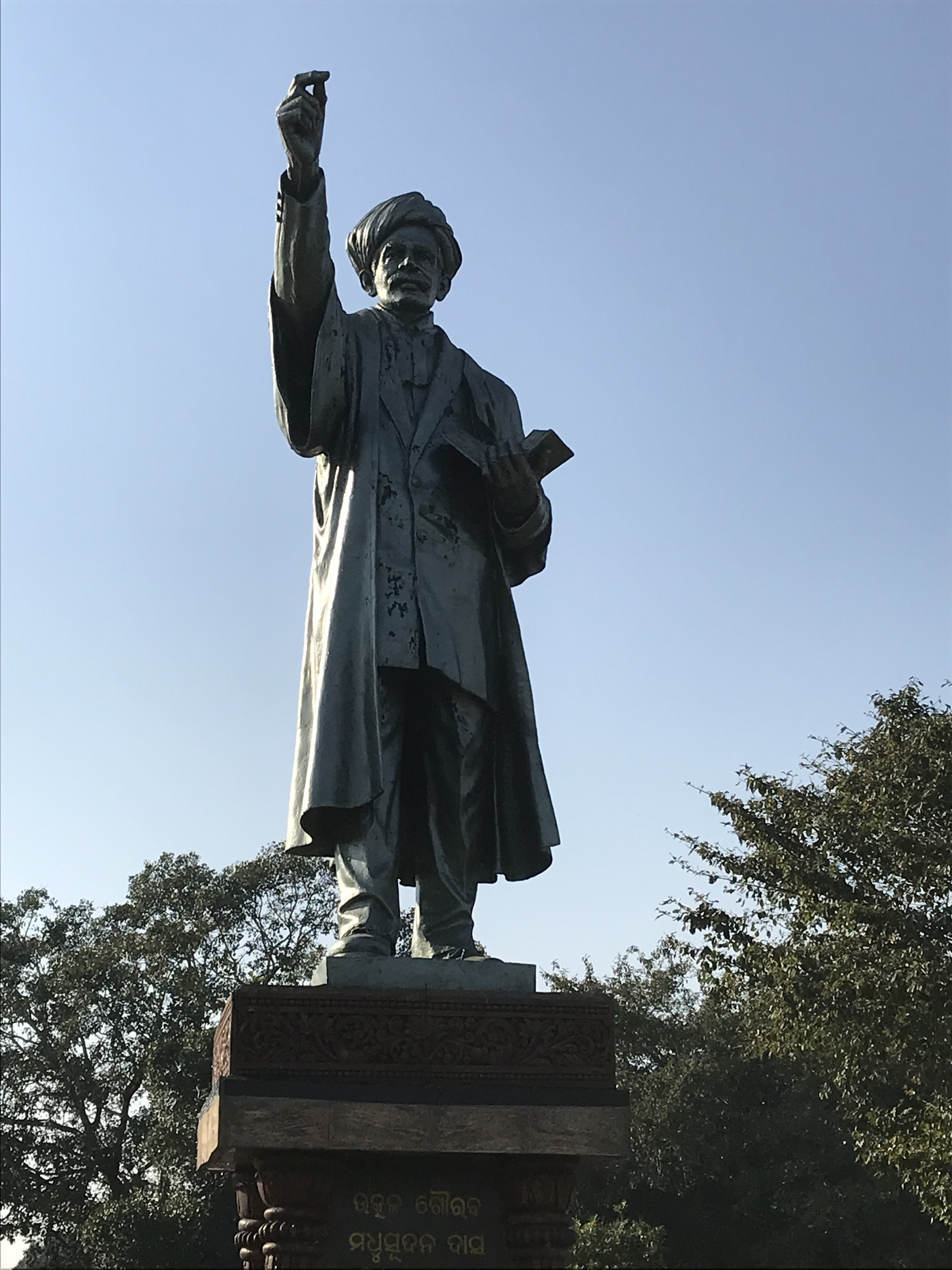
Madhusudan Statue

Cuttack is the birthplace of Utkala Gaurav Madhusudan Das. His former residence and workplace Madhusmruti was converted to Sailabala Women's College in 1952. A small hall within the college premises has been preserved as Madhusudan Sangrahalaya, that contains works and memoirs of the great architect of Odisha.

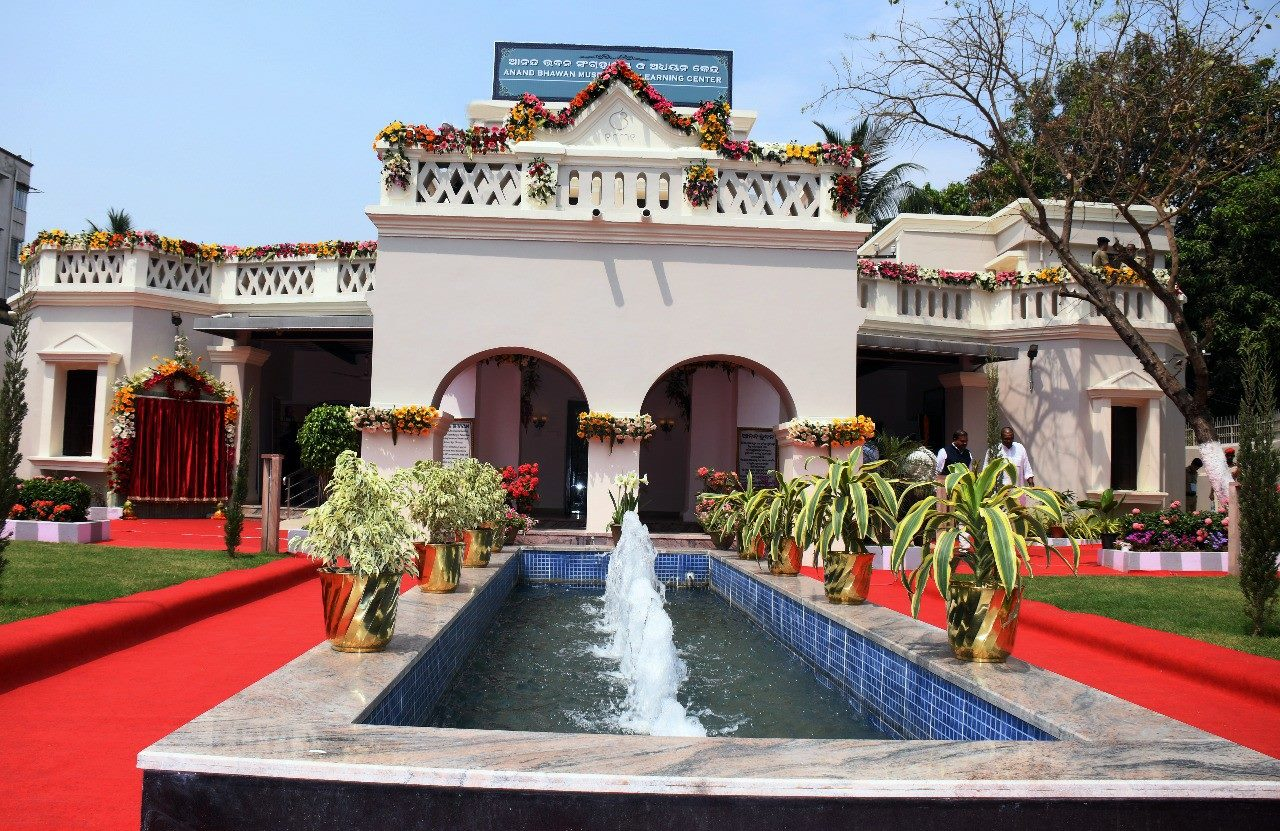
Anand Bhawan Museum and Learning Centre

=== Anand Bhavan Museum and Learning Centre ===
Anand Bhavan, the ancestral house of Biju Patnaik at Tulsipur, was converted into a memorial museum in 2016. Chief Minister of Odisha Naveen Patnaik's grandfather Laxmi Narayan Patnaik had built Anand Bhavan. Biju Babu was born there on 5 March 1916. Biju Babu's iconic Dakota DC-3 aircraft used to rescue Indonesian prime minister Sultan Sjahrir is scheduled to be showcased near his ancestral home.

=== Odisha State Maritime Museum ===
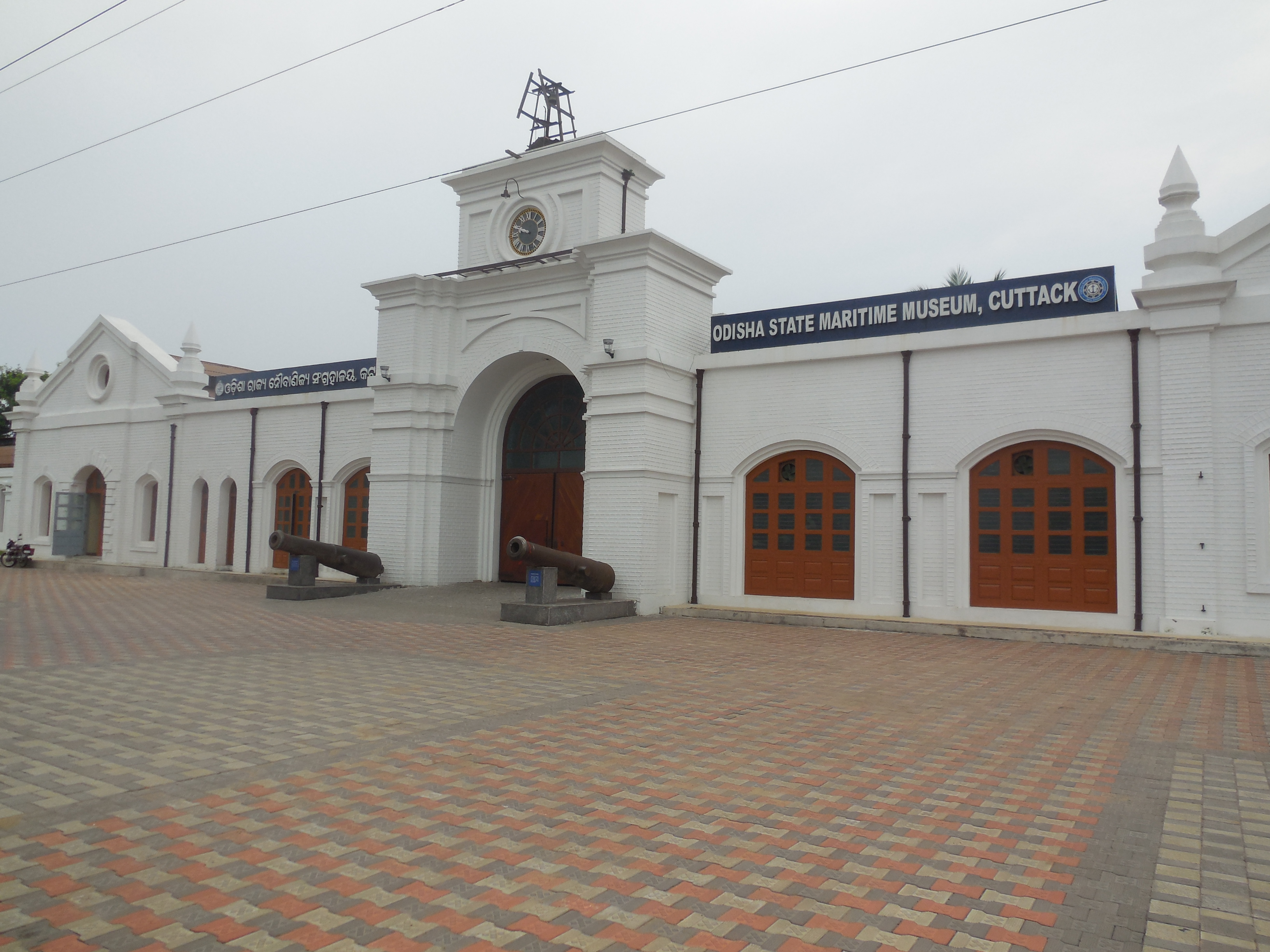
Odisha State Maritime Museum

The Odisha State Maritime Museum was inaugurated by the Odisha chief minister Shri Naveen Pattnaik on 1 April 2013. It has been set up at the erstwhile Jobra workshop on the banks of river Mahanadi near Jobra. It has 10 number of galleries and an aquarium. In 1882 the East India Irrigation Company build an anicut (Jobra Anicut) (6349 ft. long) across the river Mahanadi near jobra and the Jobra Khunti (Pillar) to serve as a lighthouse to boats and cargo vessels passing through the river and the Taladanda canal.

=== Old Jail Complex and the Freedom Fighter's Memorial ===
This location was inaugurated by Hon. Chief Minister of Odisha Naveen Patnaik on 23 January 2010, on the occasion of Netaji Jayanti. It is situated at the Old Jail complex. The old jail complex of Cuttack near Ganga Mandir tank and Dargha Bazar was a colonia-period jail cellular jail where many notable freedom fighters were imprisoned during the Swaraj movement.

=== Swaraj Ashram ===
The Swaraj Ashram at Telengabazar is synonymous with Mahatma Gandhi's relationship with Odisha, Cuttack in particular. The double-storey Ashram, located opposite the banks of the Kathajodi River. was in the thick of the Non Cooperation Movement in the 1920s. This is where Gandhi stayed during his visits to Odisha. The ashram that spreads over an area of 1,100 square feet (100 m^{2}) has been converted into a protected monument by the Government of Odisha. There are around 200 photographs in the ashram that captured Gandhi's visit to Odisha beginning with the one in 1921, the first of his seven trips to Odisha's 69 sites till 1946. Historians say that Cuttack was the seat of the Freedom Movement in Odisha and the Swaraj Ashram played a pivotal role in paving the way for Swaraj Movement

=== Maratha barracks ===
The Marhatta barracks are medieval era structures in Chauliaganj, presently used as headquarters of the 6th battalion of the Odisha State Armed police Force (OSAPF), were used as armoury both during the Marhatta and British rule. These iconic long barracks are one of the oldest surviving buildings of Odisha and are widely perceived as original remaining structures and a unique example of the synthesis of Maratha and Odishan architecture. Rajaram Pandit started the work in 1775 and it was completed by Sadasiva Rao in 1795. Spread across a vast patch of forest land on the outskirts of the city, the place was infested by tigers, panthers, snakes and other wildlife. The forest was cleared except for some ancient trees, which are still standing tall. The domed structures were solidly built with local materials. Kiln baked bricks and lime mortar was used. There were big wells in the compound and underground cells. Separate stables for their horses and elephants, magazines for storing gunpowder, living quarters etc. were made. The barracks housed the artillery, cavalry and infantry forces. The Marathas had as many as 2,000 soldiers in the barracks. There was a thick wall around with watchtowers, none of which now exist.

=== Salt House ===
Britishers had built the Salt House in 1847–48 and the Collectorate was functioned from this house till new building was built. River 'Kathajodi' was the main transit source for the commercial commodities. The length of the buildings is 190' with 66 pillars. Presently the building is used as Courts of Sub Divisional Judicial Magistrates. The building had an aristocratic look with 3 guns standing as guards. The architecture of the building has been completely disfigured with many brickworks and structures.

=== Lal Bagh Palace ===
Situated on the bank of the Kathjodi, the Lal Bagh Palace at Cuttack has a long and colourful history. This building witnessed the rise and fall of several rulers who controlled the fortune of Odisha. It was constructed by the Mughal Subedar stationed at Cuttack. Subsequently, the property passed into the hands of the Marathas. Over the years the premises have undergone several alterations and modifications. William Bruton visited Cuttack in 1633, when the Lal Bagh Palace was under construction. In 1741, Saulat Jung, the Naib Nazim, fixed his residence in the palace. The building was occupied by the Naib Nazims till 1751 and by the representatives of the Bhonslas of Nagpur from 1751 to 1803. Lal Bagh came into the possession of the British in 1803 when Colonel Harcourt's men defeated the Maratha soldiers. The Lal Bagh Palace was apparently leased out but again came into the possession of Government, who sold it in January 1862, and the purchaser sold the estate along with the building to the East India Irrigation Company. In 1863, the building came into the possession of the Government when they took over the irrigation works from the company. Since 1868 the building was occupied by Commissioners and sometimes by Collectors. In 1896, Shri R.C. Dutt, the then Commissioner, who was also a well-known historian, lived in this building. In a letter to his daughter, he describes the building as "the best-situated Commissioner's house." The building which was still under the Irrigation Branch was transferred to the Buildings and Roads Branch of the Government in 1914. In 1941, Shri K.C. Gajapati Narayan Deo, Maharaja of Parlakimedi and Premier of Orissa, fixed his residence at the Lal Bagh palace for a time. On 18 July 1942, the Lal Bagh Palace became the new Government House. Sir Hawthorne Lewis was the first Governor to live in the Lal Bagh Palace. This historic building, which stood witness to countless political and social upheavals during Mughal, Maratha and British rule in Odisha, became the centre of administration. The Lal Bagh Palace continued to serve as the residence of the Governor till 1960. During the tenure of Shri Sukthankar in 1960, the Raj Bhavan was shifted from Cuttack to Bhubaneswar. Shri Sukthankar generously donated the building to the Indian Red Cross Society to utilize it as a children's hospital. The Government of Orissa [now, Odisha] took over this hospital in 1966 and made it an independent institute for post-graduate training and research. At present, the institute is known as Sardar Vallabhbhai Patel Post Graduate Institute of Pediatrics, and is popularly known as Shishu Bhavan.

=== Kanika Rajbati ===
It is a palace built by Raja Bahadur Rajendra Narayan Bhanjdeo in Cuttack. Once a high-profile area and favourite homestay of Rajkanika rajas as well as British era guest house, this historic structure now lies in a dilapidated state.

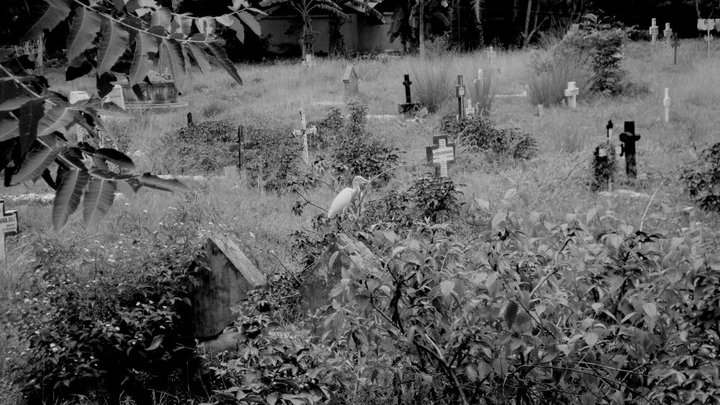
Gorakabar Anglican Cemetery

=== Gora Kabar Cemetery ===
The Gora Kabar was set up in an area of five acres by the banks of the Mahanadi on the outskirts of the city by the East India Company in 1822. The presence of the English officials and their families had become significant after the occupation of Cuttack in 1803. The site already had graves of a few Englishmen before it was walled in and designated as a graveyard. Initially it was a cemetery for all Christians, but later on it was used only by the Baptists.

=== Shree Gopal Krishna Goshala ===
The antiquity of this old complex is not exactly known. Old timers of Cuttack call it the Goshala, but it was originally a Dharamshala for the pilgrims of the old Jagannath Sadak. Just 100 metres from the Nayabazar Chhak, on the far end of the city, it lay right by the side of the old road. This stretch of the Jagannath Sadak, from the Mahanadi till the Kathjori Ghat was once a 100 feet wide road. During the monsoons, when the Mahanadi was often in spate, pilgrims often had to camp for days to make the crossing; the Dharamshala was built well away from the flood plain, right between the two rivers. The place was originally set up as a Dharamshala by one Seth Jagannath Halan of Calcutta. It was a huge complex with rooms and halls for the pilgrims. There was a big tank and wells dug inside the complex and a large pond, which still exists. It was the largest Dharamshala of the old road and could house a thousand pilgrims. There was a separate accommodation block for the Sadhus and Mahants who travelled on the old road. Many of the pilgrims camped under the huge trees. In 1905, two benevolent Marwaris of Salkia in Howrah District, Seth Bishen Dayal and Seth Hari Dayal, took over the abandoned Dharamshala and transformed it into a Goshala. There is a marble plaque which says that the Victoria Gorakhini Sabha opened the Goshala in the place in 1905. They made some alterations and repairs to the old building and made it into a charitable institution rendering service for old and infirm cattle.

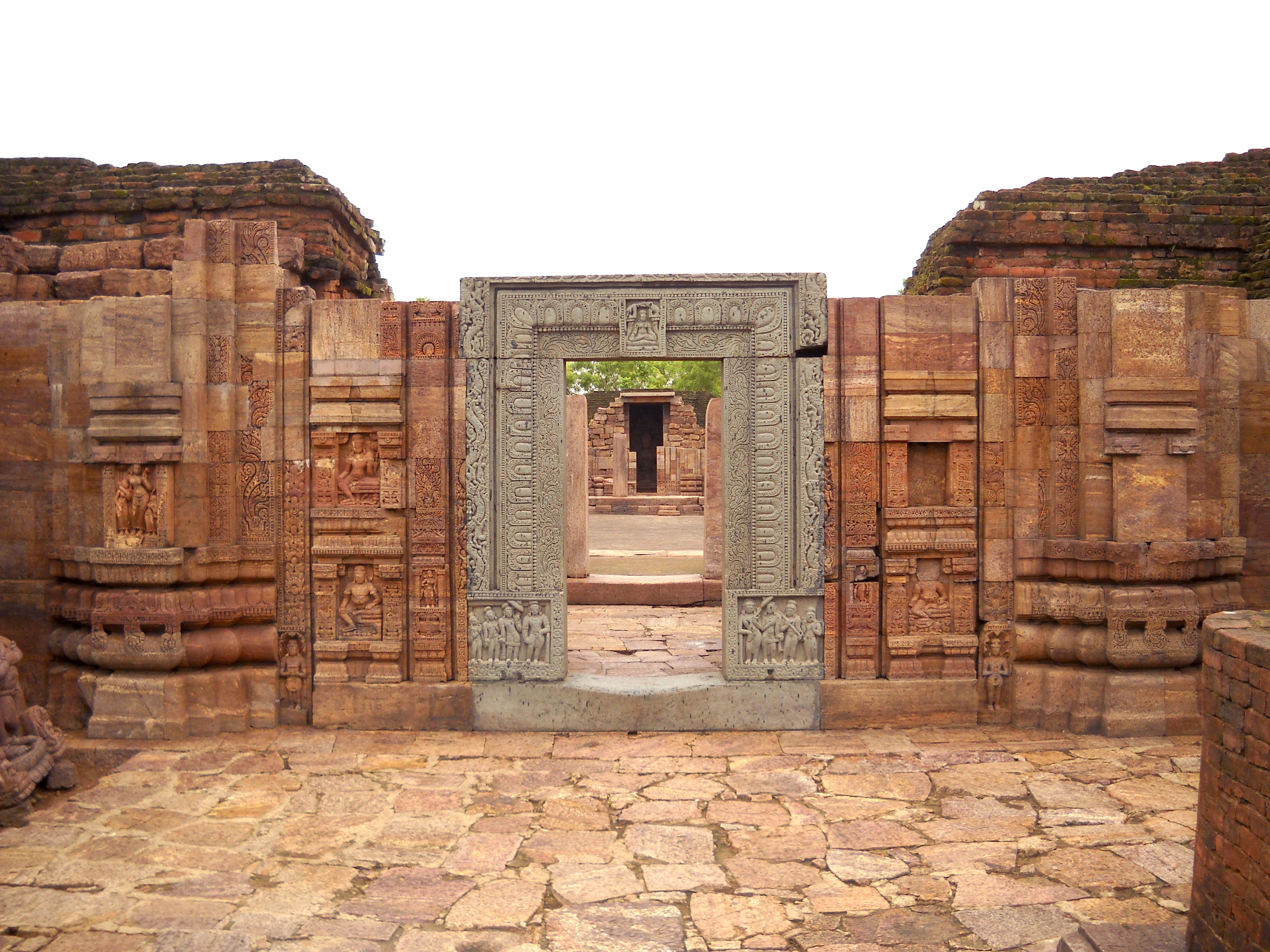
Lalitgiri as a part of Pushpagiri Mahavihara

=== Lalitgiri ===
Lalitgiri also known as Naltigiri is a major Buddhist Mahavihara complex in the Indian state of Odisha comprising major stupas, 'esoteric' Buddha images, and monasteries (viharas), one of the oldest sites in the region. Together with the Ratnagiri and Udayagiri sites, Lalitgiri is part of Puspagiri University located on top of hills of the same names. The three complexes are known as the "Diamond Triangle". Significant finds at this complex include Buddha's relics. Tantric Buddhism was practised at this site.

=== Olasuni Hill ===
Olasuni hill stands on the border of Cuttack and Jajpur district, adjacent to the Daitari- Paradip Express Highway. The saint Arakhita Das after travelling widely, finally chose Olasuni hill as his Sadhana Pitha. There he meditated in a cave for a long period and finally attained salvation. The hill is dotted with temples, among which the temple of Goddess Olasuni, the presiding deity and the tomb of Saint Arakhit Das are famous. The sleepy Olasuni hill wakes up to the delight of the devotees, on Magha Ekadasi every year, who throng the place in large numbers to witness the nine-day Gumpha Yatra. The Yatra commemorates the death anniversary or Shradha Mahostav of the saint Arakhita Das who lived here 200 years ago.

=== Parks and gardens ===
==== Ocean World water park ====
The city has the state's only water park named Ocean World. Due to the strategic location of the water park being situated on the midway of Cuttack and Bhubaneswar, it is a popular outing location for the people of both cities.

==== CMC Deer park ====
A deer park is situated beside the Mahanadi Ring Road at Madhusudan Nagar, overseeing the Mahanadi River. The park has about 200 deer. The Park is maintained by the CMC.

==== Recreational parks ====
The city is filled with numerous social parks. Biju Pattnaik park, Birenmitra Park, Gouri Shankar park, Kathajodi river view park, Khannagar park, Jobra park Jayprakash Narayan park are some of the prominent existing parks.

==== Nandankanan Zoological Park and Botanical Gardens ====
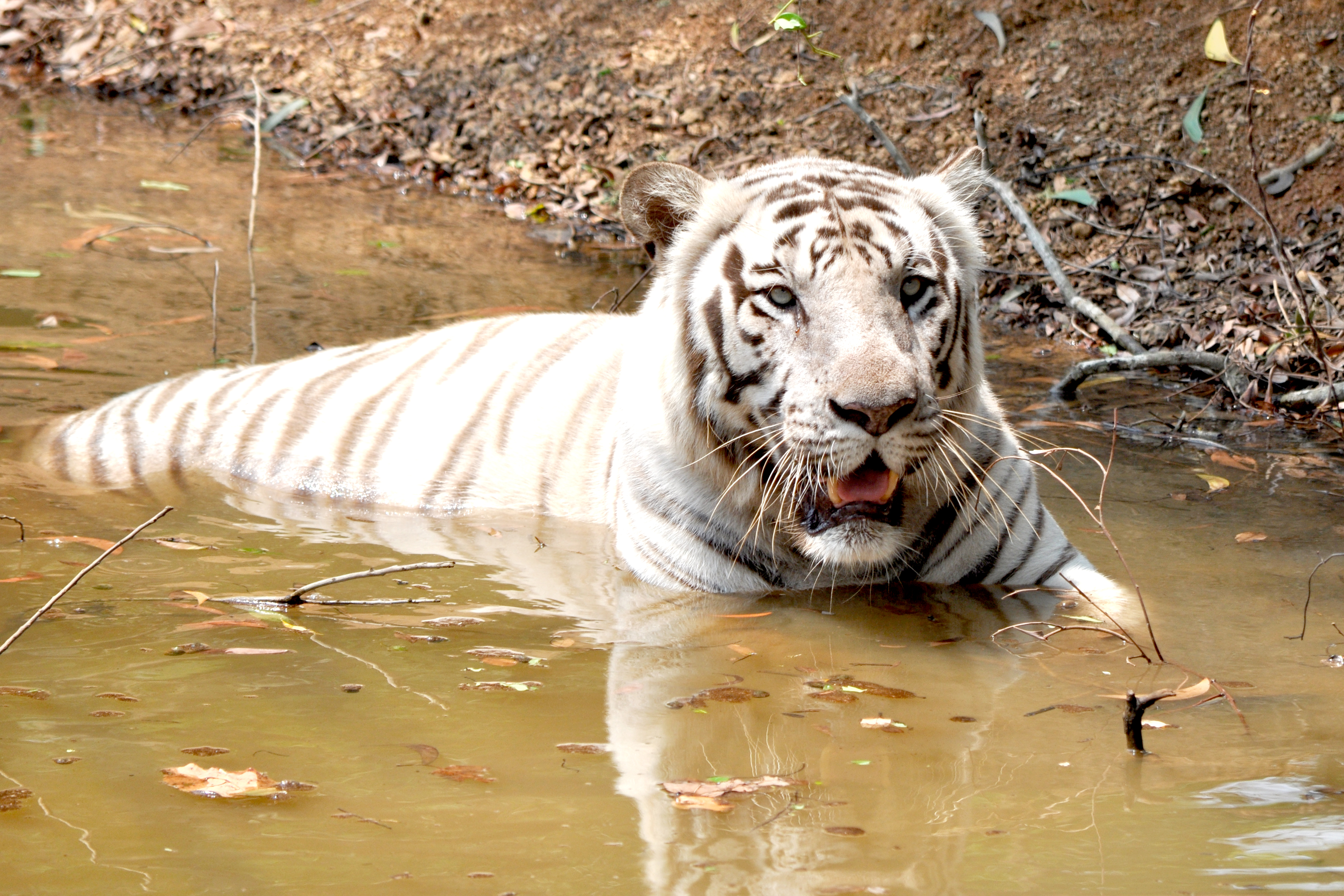
Tiger at Nandankanan Zoo

Nandankanan is a 400-hectare (990-acre) zoo and botanical garden near Baranga between Cuttack and Bhubaneswar. Established in 1960, it was opened to the public in 1979 and became the first zoo in India to join World Association of Zoos and Aquariums (WAZA) in 2009. It also contains a botanical garden and part of it has been declared a sanctuary. Nandankanan, literally meaning The Garden of Heaven, is located in the environs of the Chandaka forest, and includes the 134-acre (54 ha) Kanjia lake.

==== Chandaka Elephant Sanctuary ====
Chandka Elephant Sanctuary is a wildlife reserve located in the northwestern fringe of Bhubaneswar in the Indian state of Odisha. Nestled on Khurdha uplands of the Eastern Ghats biotic region, Chandaka forest is spread over 175.79 square kilometres (67.87 sq mi) of rolling table land and small sprawling hillocks of Khurdha and Cuttack Districts. It was designated as an elephant reserve in December 1982.

==== Naraj Peacock Valley ====
Situated at Talapada village a few minutes drive from Naraj bridge and hardly 15 km away from Cuttack is a forest famous for herds of peacocks. 16yrs back when super-cyclone plunked Odisha with its formidable appearance, 3 peacocks from Chandaka reserved forest popped up to this area, where a man named Panu Behera, serving as a forest range caretaker for the cashew nut forest took responsibility to feed them. Since then it has been more than one and half decade now and the flock has been raised to 48. Without any Govt support, Behera has pledged to take care all of these birds till his death thereby earning the name "Peacock man". A few local youngsters took over the charges of present-day peacock herd of 150 male and female.

==== Mahanadi River Boating ====
Jetty has been constructed on Mahanadi near Jobra to facilitate tourists for river cruise ride to Dhabaleshwar or motor boating on Mahanadi. NCC has an exclusive jetty for naval cadet training.

=== Lakes and reservoirs ===
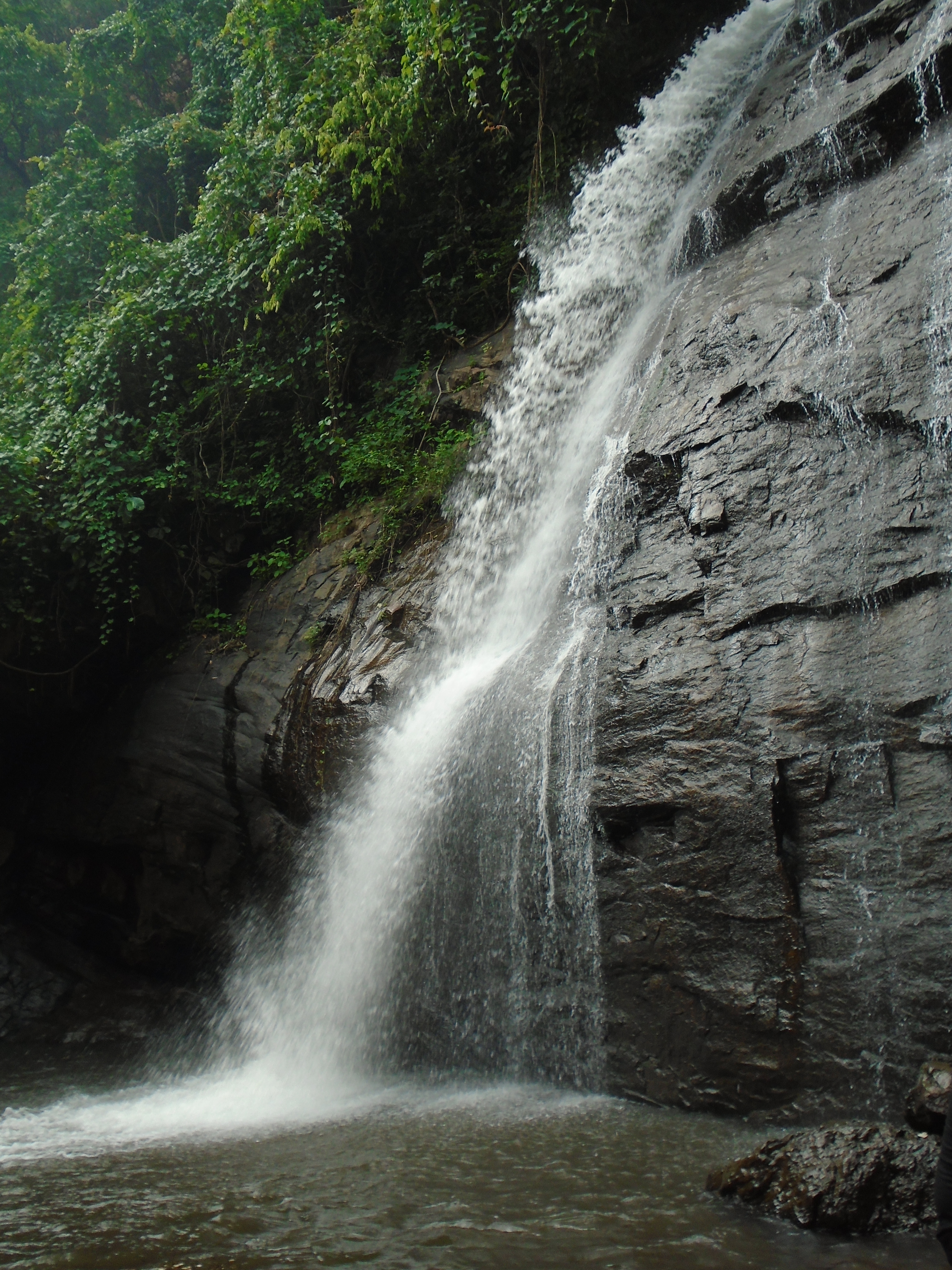

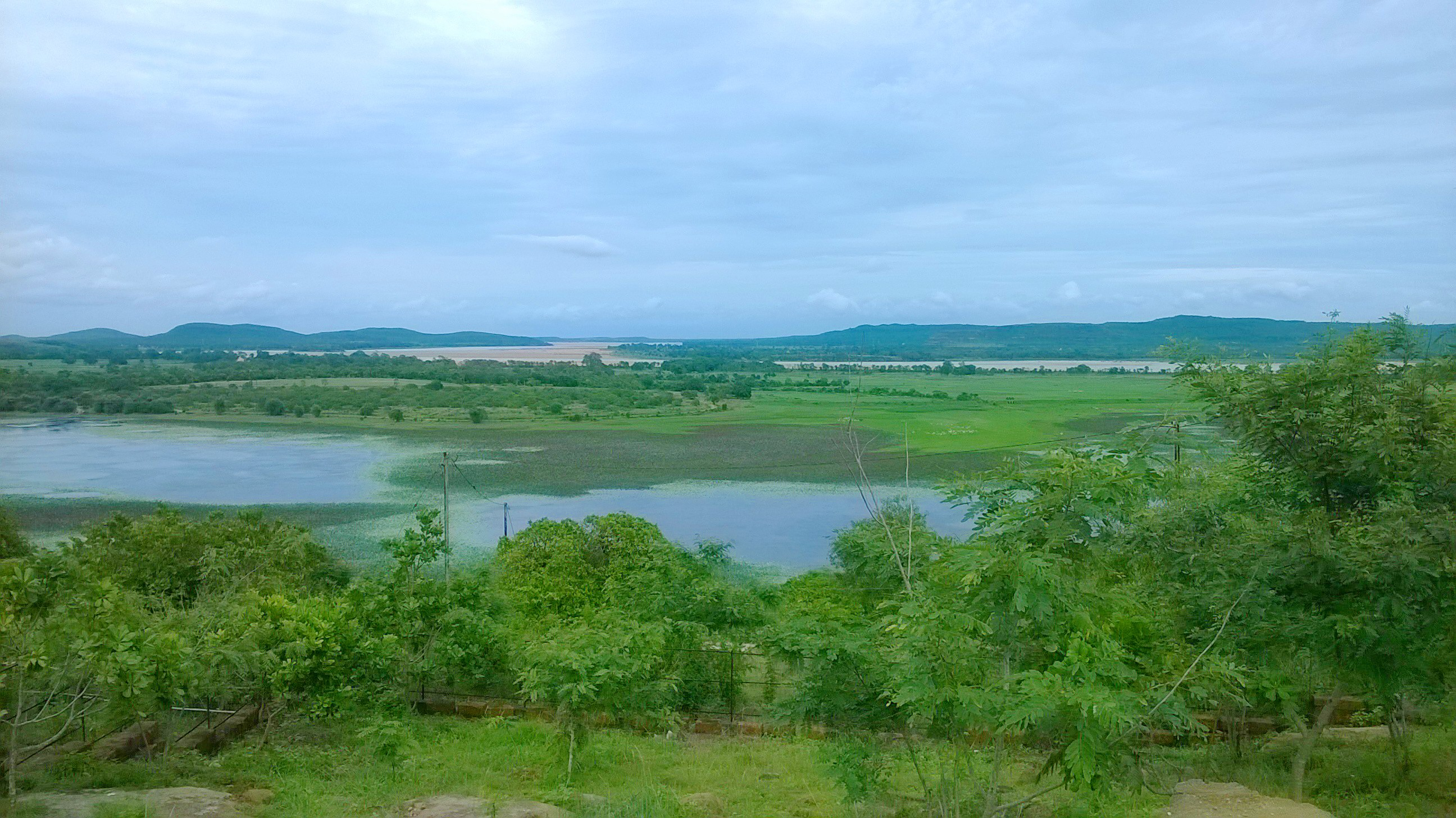
Anshupa Lake

==== Deojhar WaterFalls, Narasinghpur, Cuttack ====
Considered as the one & only waterfall in the entire district this waterfall is around 100 km from Cuttack's main city & can be reached Via Athagada & Badamba.

==== Anshupa Lake ====
Anshupa lake is a 141-hectare horseshoe-shaped fresh water lake on the left bank of the Mahanadi river. It is 40 km from the city and acts as a shelter for the migratory birds in the wintry weather season. This small lake holds a prominent position in the tourist map of Odisha for its natural environment and proximity to both Cuttack and Bhubaneswar. Some bamboo cottages are made on the top of Saranda hill for tourist refreshments. Boating facilities are available.

==== Jobra Barrage ====
Jobra Barrage or Jobra Anikut as widely called is a major source of water for the Mahanadi delta region. Taladanda canal, a major irrigation and flood canal in coastal area starts from here. IOCL's Paradip Refinery has its water intake point from this barrage.

==== Naraj and Mundali Reservoirs ====
Situated at the bifurcation point of Mahanadi and Kathajodi rivers, it marks the westernmost tip of Cuttack city. It is a major irrigation dam on Kathajodi river that ensures the water level in Mahanadi river and thereby preventing flood situations in Cuttack. Near to the Naraj Barrage is the Mundali barrage that is the starting point of Puri Canal. Naraj is a major railway station apart from Cuttack railway station. The area surrounding Naraj has many industries.

==== Stone revetment on Mahanadi ====
Idea of Embankment and fund contribution given by Cuttack Raksaka Baimundi to Maharaja Markata Keshari to save Cuttack from Flood. The King then constructed the Historic Embankment and named as Baimundi Embankment.

== Notable people ==
The following notable people were born in, or have spent a major part of their life in, Cuttack.

- Afzal-ul Amin
- Susmita Bagchi
- Urvashi Bahuguna
- Bhikari Bal
- Netaji Subhas Chandra Bose
- Ramadevi Choudhury
- Bibhusita Das
- Madhusudan Das
- Mihir Das
- Sailabala Das
- Shiv Sunder Das
- Rupa Dash
- Bijaya Jena
- Binod Kanungo
- Krushna Chandra Kar
- Karamat Ali Karamat
- Giridharilal Kedia
- Annapurna Maharana
- Harekrushna Mahatab
- Sayeed Mohammed
- Mohammad Mohsin
- Sabyasachi Mishra
- Sohini Mishra
- Biren Mitra
- Akshaya Mohanty
- Anubhav Mohanty
- Artaballabha Mohanty
- Pradip Kumar Mohanty
- Debashish Mohanty
- Kumkum Mohanty
- Sona Mohapatra
- Baishnaba Pani
- Biswambhar Parida
- Biju Patnaik
- Hara Patnaik
- Naveen Patnaik
- Gopala Chandra Praharaj
- Radhanath Rath
- Koovarji Karsan Rathor
- Rabi Ray
- Trishna Ray
- Subhash Chandra Singh
- Kabir Suman
- Nandini Satpathy
- Ratikant Satpathy
- Suparno Satpathy
- Samuel Tickell
- Walter Walker

== See also ==
- Cuttack Lok Sabha constituency
- Cuttack Development Authority
- Sailo Jharapada
- Largest Indian cities by GDP
