= Bikram Keshari Barma =

Indian politician and writer (1940–2021)

- ବିକ୍ରମ କେଶରୀ ବର୍ମା

Member of the 13th Odisha Legislative Assembly
- In office 2004–2009
- Preceded by: Sarat Kumar Kar
- Succeeded by: Pratap Jena
- Constituency: Mahanga

Personal details
- Born: 25 May 1940 Mouda, Cuttack, British India
- Died: 5 June 2021 (aged 81) Bhubaneswar, Odisha, India
- Party: Biju Janata Dal
- Spouse: Jachi Routray
- Parent: Late Rai Charan Barma (father)
- Education: M.A, B.Ed.
- Profession: Politician, Educationist, Social Worker, Writer

Bikram Keshari Barma (Odia: ବିକ୍ରମ କେଶରୀ ବର୍ମା) (25 May 1940 – 5 June 2021) was an Indian politician, educationist, social worker, and writer from the state of Odisha. He served as a member of the 13th Odisha Legislative Assembly representing the Mahanga constituency.

== Early life and education ==
Barma was born on May 25, 1940 in the village of Mouda, located in Cuttack, then part of British India, to Late Rai Charan Barma. He pursued higher education, earning multiple degrees including M.A. and B.Ed., which equipped him for a career in academia, social service, and politics.

== Personal life ==
Barma was married to Smt. Jachi Routray. He was interested in reading, writing, and social service, with a focus on organizing farmers and teachers. He contributed significantly to rural education by helping establish several colleges and schools in Cuttack and Balasore districts and was highly regarded for his contributions to rural education in Odisha.

== Political career ==
Barma was a member of the 13th Odisha Legislative Assembly, representing the Mahanga constituency from 2004 to 2009 as part of the Biju Janata Dal (BJD). He also held various leadership positions:

- Chairman of Orissa State Seeds Corporation (1990–1995), where he received the Second Best Productivity Award from the Central Government in 1991.
- President of Krushak Janata Dal (1993–2000).
- President of Orissa Krushak Manch (2002 onwards).
- Founder president of United Teachers' and Employees' Association, Orissa (1994).
- General secretary, Oriya Sanskruti Sammilani.
- President, Mahanga Prativa Puja Sansad.

== Academic contributions ==
Before entering full-time politics, Barma served as principal at Khaira College, Balasore (1980–1982) and J.N. College, Kuanpal, Cuttack (1982–1990). His contributions to education extended beyond administration to organizing literary meetings and cultural events.

== Literary contributions ==
Barma was an accomplished writer with significant contributions to Odia literature. He authored 14 books in Odia and 2 in English, including:

- Orissa at a Glance (Poetry)
- Biplabi Srikrishna (Essay)
- Sahitya O Rajaniti (Literary Criticism)
- Sarala Dasnka Patra (Literary Criticism)

He also wrote novels, poetry collections, dramas in verse, and literature for children. He also published a monthly magazine titled Himadri. He was actively involved in organising literary and cultural events, including Jayanti meetings in memory of Gana Kabi Baishnaba Pani, Dr. Mayadhar Mansingh, and Kabi Samrat Upendra Bhanja across Mahanga, Cuttack, and Bhubaneswar.

Barma was a Life Member of Utkal Sahitya Samaj, one of the oldest literary institutions in Odisha.

== Social activities ==
Barma was deeply committed to social service. He organized farmers and teachers across Odisha and contributed to the establishment of educational institutions in Cuttack and Balasore districts. He leaded various social movements related to education and agrarian reforms.

== Death ==
Barma died on 5 June 2021 at a private hospital in Bhubaneswar, at the age of 81, reportedly due to complications related to COVID-19 pandemic in Odisha.

== See also ==
- Biju Janata Dal
- Naveen Pattnaik
- Rajya Sabha
- Politics of Odisha
- Sarat Kumar Kar
- Pratap Jena
- Mahanga
- Kendrapara
