= Sarat Kumar Kar =

Indian politician, writer, and orator (1939–2020)

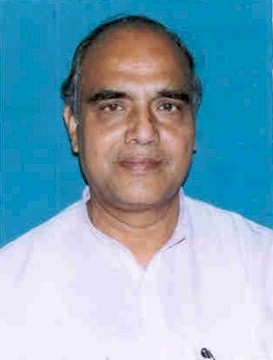

12th Speaker of the Odisha Legislative Assembly
- In office 10 March 2000 – 21 May 2004
- Preceded by: Chintamani Dyan Samantra
- Succeeded by: Maheswar Mohanty

Member of the Odisha Legislative Assembly
- In office 2000–2004
- Preceded by: Shaikh Matlub Ali
- Succeeded by: Bikram Keshari Barma
- Constituency: Mahanga
- In office 1990–1995
- Preceded by: Shaikh Matlub Ali
- Succeeded by: Shaikh Matlub Ali
- In office 1971–1974
- Preceded by: Biraja Prasad Ray
- Succeeded by: Shaikh Matlub Ali

Member of the 6th Lok Sabha
- In office 1977–1980
- Preceded by: Janaki Ballabh Patnaik
- Succeeded by: Janaki Ballabh Patnaik
- Constituency: Cuttack

Personal details
- Born: 5 September 1939 Adam Mahespur, Cuttack, British India
- Died: 12 October 2020 (aged 81) Bhubaneswar, Odisha, India
- Party: Biju Janata Dal
- Other political affiliations: Indian National Congress, Janata Party, Janata Dal, Utkal Congress
- Spouse: Anima Mishra Kar
- Children: Suman Kar, Sobhan Kar
- Parent: Late Kulamani Kar (father)
- Relatives: Rajat Kumar Kar (brother)
- Education: M.A. in Political Science
- Alma mater: Ravenshaw University, Allahabad University
- Profession: Politician, Journalism, Social Worker, Academician, Writer

Sarat Kumar Kar (Odia: ଶରତ କୁମାର କର) (5 September 1939 – 12 October 2020) was an Indian politician, writer, poet, and orator from the state of Odisha, India. He was a three-time member of the Odisha Legislative Assembly and served as the Speaker of the Odisha Legislative Assembly from 2000 to 2004. Kar was also a Member of Parliament in the 6th Lok Sabha, representing the Cuttack constituency.

He was a member of the Biju Janata Dal (BJD) political party. He had a multifaceted career that spanned politics, literature, and cultural advocacy.

== Early life and education ==
Sarat Kumar Kar was born on September 5, 1939 in the village of Adam Mahespur, located in Cuttack, then part of British India. He completed his early education in Cuttack and pursued higher studies at Ravenshaw College. He later earned his Master’s degree in Political Science from Allahabad University.

== Political career ==
Kar entered politics in 1964 after completing his master's degree in Political Science from Allahabad University. While at the university, he came into contact with Lal Bahadur Shastri, whose ideals and leadership deeply influenced him. Kar attended several political meetings addressed by Shastri and subsequently became a member of the All India Congress Committee (AICC). Following Shastri's suggestion, Kar met Biju Patnaik upon returning to Odisha. Their meeting marked the beginning of a long and close association, with Kar remaining a trusted confidant of Biju Babu until his death. Over the years, Kar became associated with various political parties, including the Janata Party, before eventually joining the Biju Janata Dal (BJD).

He was elected to the 6th Lok Sabha in 1977 from the Cuttack parliamentary constituency after defeating Congress stalwart and the then sitting Union Minister, Janaki Ballabh Patnaik. At the state level, he was elected as an MLA three times — in 1971 (from Utkal Congress), 1990 (from JD), and 2000 (from BJD) — from the Mahanga constituency in Cuttack district.

Kar also served as the Minister for Education and Culture in the Bishwanath Das - led coalition government in 1971. He was the youngest Cabinet Minister in Odisha's history.

He was the speaker of the 12th Assembly from 10 March 2000 to 21 May 2004.

== Literary contributions ==
Apart from politics, Kar was also a well-known writer and poet. He authored four books of poetry: Druta Bilambita, Manthan, Romanthan, and Ananya. He also wrote a novel (Samayara Jete Dheu), a spiritual book, and numerous articles in Odia newspapers and magazines on topics related to literature, politics, spirituality, and social issues.

Kar received the PEN Award for his poetry collection Manthan. In addition to his literary accomplishments, he was known for his deep spiritual inclination and philosophical insight. A mystic and philosopher, he profoundly understood the Panchasakha school of thought. He was also a devout follower of Lord Jagannath.

== Personal life ==
Kar was married to Anima Mishra Kar, a retired English professor and singer who was an "A" Grade artist for All India Radio from the 1960s to the 1990s. They had two sons. His elder son, Suman Kar is a lecturer in English in Bhubaneswar. His younger son, Sobhan Kar, served as an Indian Revenue Service officer in New Delhi before opting for voluntary retirement to engage in social work.

His elder brother, Rajat Kumar Kar, was a Padma Shri awardee and an eminent Jagannath culture expert and commentator. He was known for his long-standing role as a commentator for the annual Rath Yatra on All India Radio, Doordarshan, and private TV channels for over four decades.

== Death ==
Sarat Kumar Kar died on 12 October 2020 at the age of 81 due to complications related to COVID-19 in Bhubaneswar.

== See also ==
- Biju Janata Dal
- Lal Bahadur Shastri
- Naveen Pattnaik
- Rajya Sabha
- Politics of Odisha
- Pratap Jena
- Bikram Keshari Barma
- Mahanga
- Kendrapara
- Member of Parliament, Lok Sabha

Political offices
Preceded by Chintmani Dyan Samanatara	Speaker of the Odisha Legislative Assembly; 10 March 2000 - 21 May 2004	Succeeded by Maheswar Mohanty
