= Mahanga (disambiguation) =

Mahanga may refer to

== Places ==
- Mahanga village and Community Development Block of Cuttack district, in Indian state of Odisha
- Mahanga Assembly constituency, a Vidhan Sabha constituency of Cuttack district, Odisha, India

== People ==
- Māhanga, the Māori chieftain and ancestor of the Ngāti Māhanga hapū
- Milton Mahanga (1955–), Tanzanian politician
