= Bherasalepur =

Bherasalepur Bhedasalipur
- Village
- Interactive map of Bherasalepur
- Coordinates: 20.577253°N 86.108128°E
- Country: India
- State: Orissa
- District: Cuttack

Population
  - Total: 500

Languages
  - Official: Oriya
- Time zone: UTC+5:30 (IST)
- PIN: 754201

Bherasalepur is a small village in the Cuttack district in eastern India. About 500 people live there.
