= Sookmoy Roy =

Indian businessman

- Born: Calcutta, Bengal, British India (now in West Bengal)
- Died: 1811
- Occupations: Banker, businessman

Sookmoy Roy (fl. 19th century) was a 19th-century Indian businessman, who is most notable for becoming the first Indian director of the Bank of Bengal, which is one of the predecessors of the State Bank of India. He died in 1811.

== Family ==
He was the grandson of Lakshmikanta Dhar, who was notable for being the chief banker to Robert Clive.

== Career ==
In 1809, he became a member of the very first board of directors of the Bank of Bengal. The board included others such as Henry St George Tucker, who was the accountant general of the East India Company in Bengal Presidency. Other members of the very first board of directors of the Bank of Bengal include: Alex Colvin, John Palmer, James Alexander, George Tyler, and John W. Fulton.

== Litigation ==
He was named in a major lawsuit of the 19th century namely Sookmoy Roy v. Ramnarain Missery and Ramsunder Bonnajee which involved the non payment of interest on a Sicca banknote.

== Philanthropy ==
He is well remembered for his philanthropic contributions. He made a gift of Rs. 1.50 lakh for the construction of the Cuttack Road and caravanserais for the convenience of pilgrims travelling to the Jagannath Temple, Puri.

== See also ==
- Henry St George Tucker
- Bank of Bengal
