= Adheigundi =

Adheigundi Adheigundi
- Village
- Interactive map of Adheigundi
- Coordinates: 20.457534°N 85.152624°E
- Country: India
- State: Odisha
- District: Cuttack

Government
  - Body: Panchayat

Languages
  - Official: Oriya
- Time zone: UTC+5:30 (IST)
- Vehicle registration: OD
- Nearest city: Cuttack
- Literacy: 95%
- Lok Sabha constituency: Cuttack
- Vidhan Sabha constituency: Baramba
- Civic agency: Panchayat
- Climate: hot (Köppen)
- Website: odisha.gov.in

Adheigundi is a village in the Cuttack district of Odisha, in eastern India. There is Narasingh Santara High school which is one of the best school on Narasinghpur Block. N.s. High School Adheigundi is an Upper Primary with Secondary School in Adheigundi Village of Narsinghpur. It was established in the year 1977 and the school is managed by the Department of Education. It is an Oriya Medium - Co-educational school.

N.s. High School Adheigundi is located in a government school building. The school has three classrooms. The lowest class is 8, and the highest class in the school is 10.

This school also has a playground. N.s. High School Adheigundi does not provide any residential facilities. The school also provides meal facilities, and meals are prepared in school.
