= Asureswar =

- Village
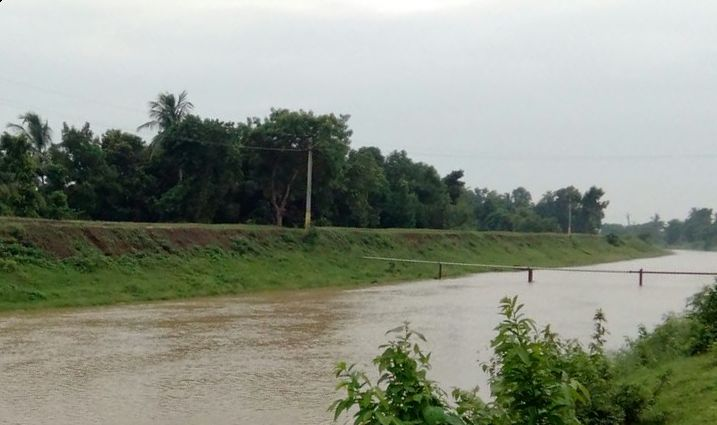
- Kendrapara Canal

- Location in Odisha, India Asureswar (India)
- Coordinates: 20.28°N 86.15°E
- Country: India
- State: Odisha
- District: Cuttack
- Elevation: 14 m (46 ft)

Languages
  - Official: Oriya
- Time zone: UTC+5:30 (IST)
- PIN: 754209
- Telephone code: 06725
- Vehicle registration: OD-05

Asureswar is a village in Odisha, India. It is located in the Nischintakoili block of Cuttack district.

The following villages come under the administration of Asureswar panchayat: Anasarapur, Bhagabatpur, Bharigol, Dhinkipada, Kendilo, and Kulagaonisahi.

== Photo gallery ==
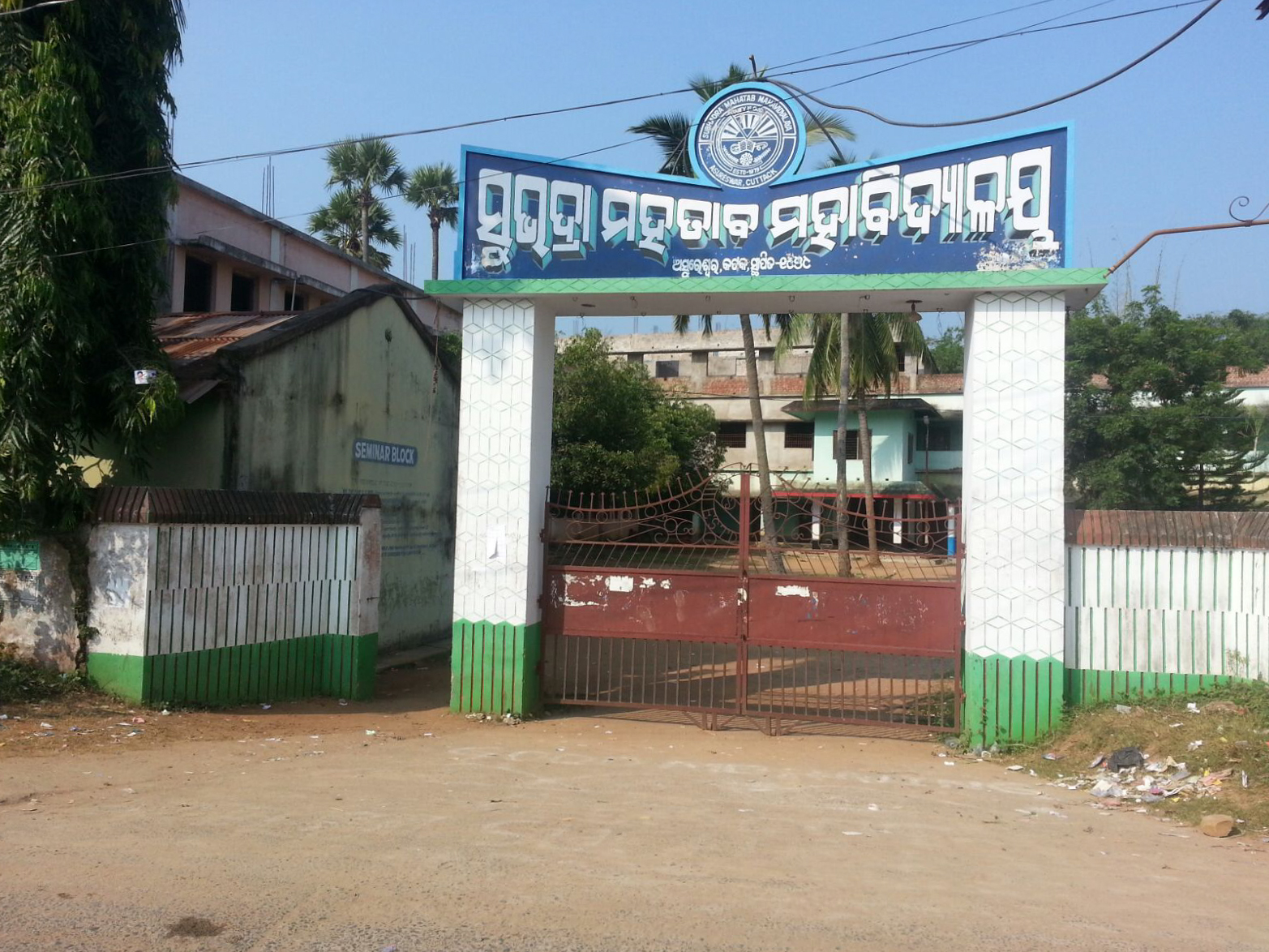
Subhadra Mahatab College

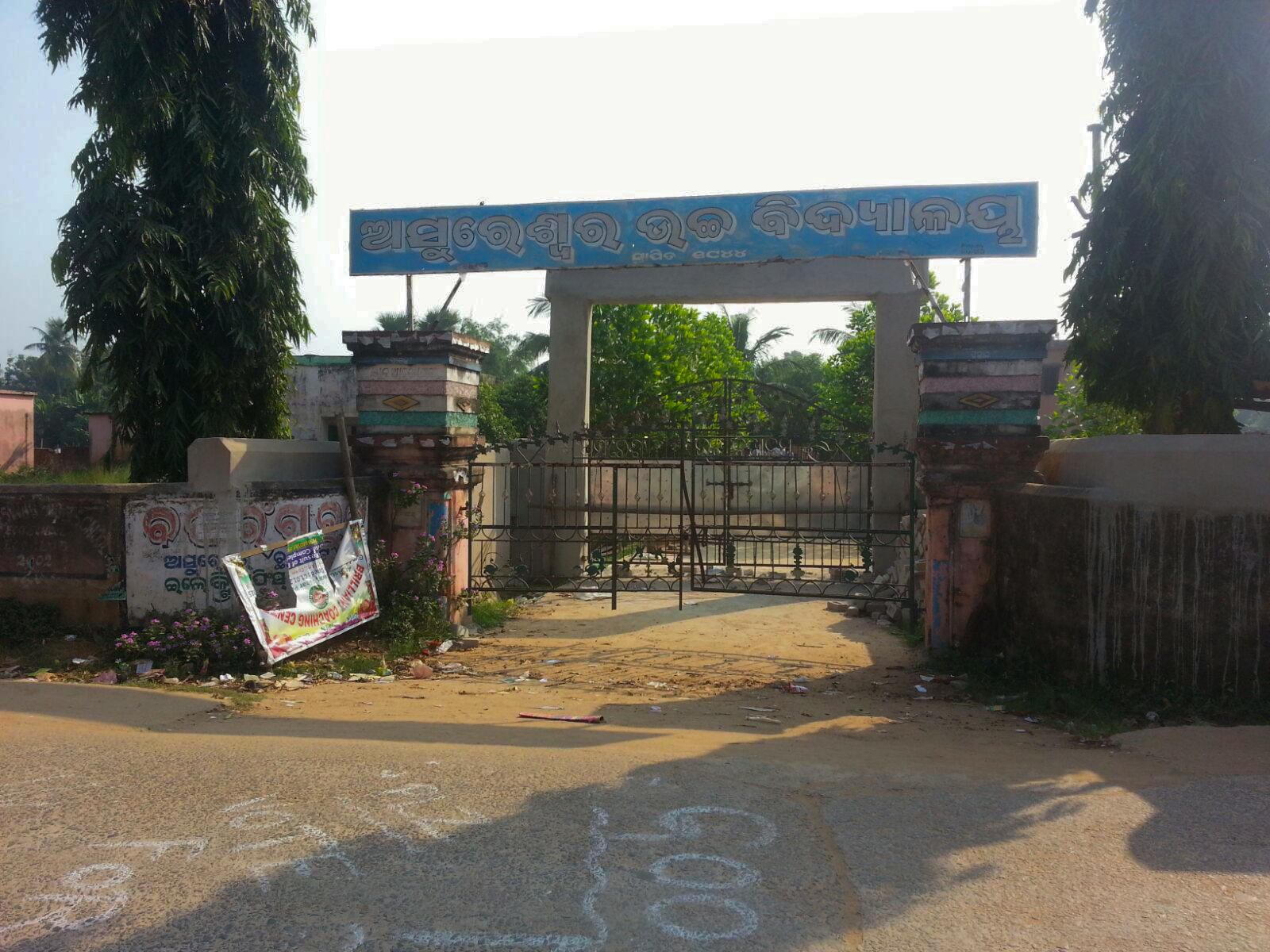
Asureswar High School
