= Dhammananda =

Dhammananda may refer to:

- K. Sri Dhammananda (1919–2006), Sri Lankan Buddhist monk and scholar
- Dhammananda Bhikkhuni (born 1944), Thai female monk

== See also ==
- Dharmananda Behera, Indian politician
- Dharmananda Damodar Kosambi (1876–1947), Indian Buddhist scholar and Pāli language expert
