= Rajat Kumar Kar =

Indian playwright (1933–2022)

Rajat Kumar Kar Padma Shri
- ରଜତ କୁମାର କର
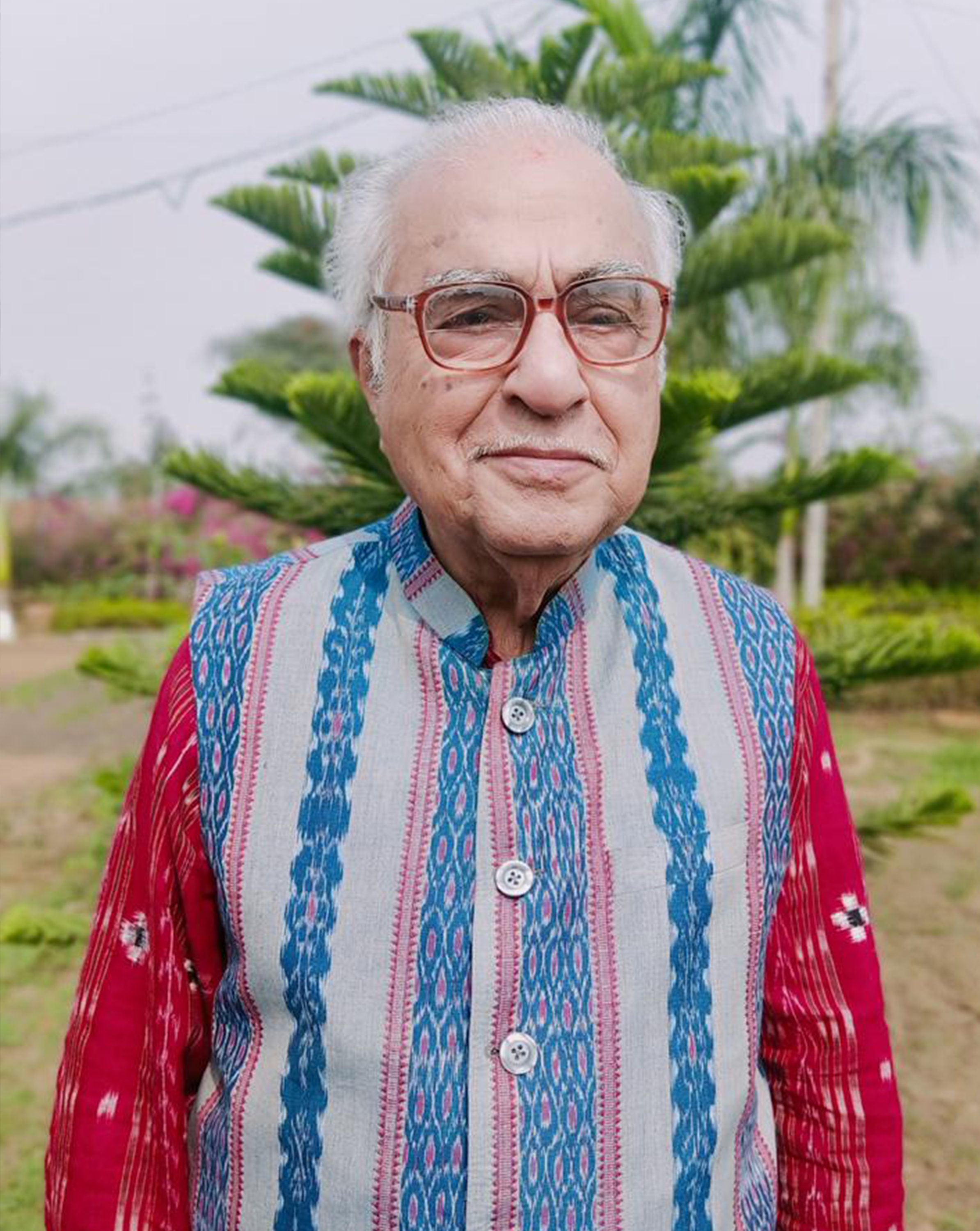
- Born: 2 September 1933; Mahanga, Cuttack, Odisha, India
- Died: 8 May 2022 (aged 88); Bhubaneswar, Odisha
- Occupations: Director Education, Odia playwright, Jagannath Culture Researcher, Radio & TV commentator
- Spouse: Shantilata Kar
- Children: Sagarika Praharaj, Er.Ranjeet Kar, Dr. Rajib Kumar Kar, Sambida Mahapatra
- Parent(s): Kulamani Kar (father); Indumati Devi (mother)
- Relatives: Sarat Kumar Kar (brother) Dr. Ansuman Kar (grandson)
- Awards: Padma Shri

Signature
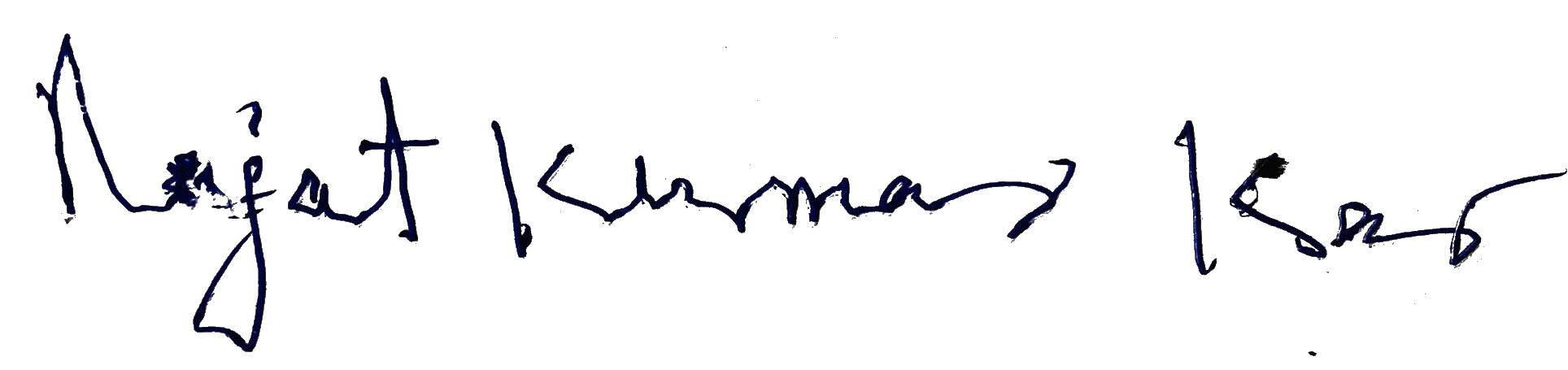

Rajat Kumar Kar (2 September 1933 – 8 May 2022) was an Indian playwright, Jagannath culture researcher, and Radio and TV commentator. He had written more than 600 plays for radio. He was the longest and oldest active commentator of the Ratha Jatra of Lord Jagannath on both TV and radio for more than 62 years. The Government of India honored him with the Padma Shri award in 2021 for his works in Odia literature. He was a prolific writer on Upendra Bhanja literature and has seven non-fiction to his credit. He has also written a few books on Lord Jagannath.

== Career ==
An economist, a planner, educational administrator and retired as Director, Teacher Education and SCERT in 1992. Served as Director, Elementary and Adult Education from 1986 to 1989 and from 1989 till 1992 as Director, SCERT Director, and Teacher Education when Government of Orissa created a Directorate for Training College and Training Schools. Held additional charge of Director, State Institute of Education and Technology from 1989 to 1992. was in-charge of TV production in education. Experience In Secondary And Primary Education AsInspector of Schools from 1968-1979, Experience In Adult And Primary Education As Deputy Director And Director Trained in N.C.C. and retired as a Captain to take up assignment as Assistant D.P.I. (NCC). Acted as Deputy Director, NCC and Physical Education and was elected as the Joint Secretary of Schools Games Federation of India. Remain in-charge of functional literacy project of adult education and got commendation from Government of India. He was also the Vice-President of the Board of Secondary Education, Odisha Former State Chief Commissioner of Bharat Scout & Guides, Odisha He was also the executive council member of Eastern Zonal Cultural Council (EZCC), Govt.of India from 2002-2008 He was also member of the Advisory committee of SREC, Govt.of Odisha. He was also a visiting Professor of Odia Literature in Utkal University.

== Literary creation ==
- Jana Jibanare Jagannath - 2006 (Basang Publication, Cuttack)
- Ananya Jagannath Anubhuthire - 2008 (Mahaveer Publication, Bhubaneswar)
- Andhaputuli - 1971 (J. Mohapatra & Co., Cuttack)
- Chandan Hajur - 1967 (Sahitya Mandir, Cuttack)
- Janana Janauchhi Jagannathnku - 1999 (Pravat Kumar Kar)
- Baisi Pabachha - 1999 (Shanti Publication, Bhubaneswar)
- Veer Chakhi Khuntia - 2003 (Ranjit Kar)
- Janamanasre Bhanja - 2007 (Basanti Publication, Cuttack)
- The Light that was India
- Lord Jagannath the Unique Deity of Odisha
- Annaya Shri Jagannath Anubhootima

TELEVISION SERIES: a) Bhagabat Tungi- Prarthana Channel b) Naivedya- Taranga TV c) Guru Bhagabat- Prarthana Channel d) BAIDEHISHABILASA of Kavi Samrat Upendra Bhanja telecasted in Prathana TV e) Badi Pala Mancha- ran successfully for 4years under his stewardship till his death f) Running Commentator for last 62years of Car Festival of Lord Jagannath g) Odisha365 series talk in youtube

== Awards & Recognitions ==
(i) Received Best Playwright Award from State Sangeet Natak Academy in 1994. (ii) Sri Jagannath Award in the Year 1998. (iii) Chira Sandhan Award 1997. (iv) Bhakta Charan Trust Award 1995. (v) Nilachala Pala Gayak Sangh Award in 2000. (vi) Award of Distinction by Andhra Oriya Teacher’s Association in 1998. (vii) Sishu Ananta award-2007 from Sishu AnantaAshram, Balianta (viii) Bhanjashree Sahitya Saman from BhanjaSmruti Sansad, Ganjam (ix) Niara Natyashilpi o NipumDharabibarinidata, from All India Radio, Cuttack (x) Adinatyakar Award-2009 from Jagmohan LalSmruti Parishad (xi) Ramchandra Mishra Natak Award-2009 from Utkal Sahitya Samaj (xii) Artabalav Samman-2004 from ArtabalavSmruti Parishad, Cuttack (xiii) Kalinga Sahitya Samaj-2004 (xiv) Rajya Stariya Pitambar Swain Orator Award - 2002 from Pitambar Swain Smruti sansadBhadrak (xv) Bichchanda Charan Samman - 2009 from Kalinga Sanskrutika Anustan, Bhubaneswar (xvi) Shri Gundicha Samman-2009 from Shri Gundicha Pratistan, Puri (xvii) Bhakta Kabi Dinakrushna Samman - 2008 from Dinakrushna Smruti Parishad.Jaleswar (xviii) Madhu Swabhiman Samman - 2008 from Ravenshaw Collegiate School Old Boys Association (xix) Balachar Bandhu Award - 2004 from Bharat Scout&Guides (xx) EminentOratorAward - 2000, OrissaSocietyof Americans, America (xxi) Jagannath Society of America Award - 2000 from JSA America (xxii) Utkal Jyoti Award - 2005 from Bharat Scout&Guides (xxiii) Ruchi Pushpagiri Samman - 2003 from Ruchi Prativa Foundation (xxiv) Best Professional and Media Excellency Award in Odia Literature - 2009 from All India Journalist Union (xxv) Gitinatyakar Award - 2006 from GanakabiSmruti Sansad, Cuttack (xxvi) Bhimsen Pati Natyakar Award - 2002 from Utkal Ashram, Berhampur (xxvii) Pandit Godabarish Mishra Award - 2011 from Sarala Sahitya Samaj (xxviii) Odisha Gourab - 2011 from Bibhababanewspaper (xxix) Chitrakala Nayak Samman - 2011 from Satadru (xxx) Prativa Samman - 2012 from Berhampur University (xxxi) ‘Kabi Jayakrushna Mishra Samman - 2013’ from Chiransandhan (xxxii) ‘Bagdevi Samman’ - 2014 from MahangaSahitya Sanskrutika Samaj (xxxiii) ‘Bansi Samman’ - 2014 from Cuttack ZilaJadhav Samaj (xxxiv) “PRATHANA SAMMANA” by Prathana Channel the only Religious Channel of Odisha. (xxxv) “Adi Kabi Sarala Sammana” by SaralaSansada. (xxxvi) Odisha Sahitya Akademi- Life time Achievement Ovation in the field of Literature in year 2017 (xxxvii) Received Honorary D.Lit from Utkal University of Culture in 2017 (xxxviii) “Shri Jagannath Samman” Shri Jagannath Pratisthan, Puri in 2018 (xxxvix) Dr Basudev Kar Memorial Award 2019 (xl) Mahanga Sahitya Mahotsab Sammna 2020 (xli) Padmashri in field of Art & Literature in 2021 And many more honours, medals, certificate, titles from various regional, national and international organizations.

== Death ==
Kar died at 88 on 8 May 2022 in a private (Apollo Hospital) hospital in Bhubaneswar due to heart disease.
