= Belagachhia =

- Town
- Location in Odisha, India Belagachhia (India)
- Coordinates: 20.4358°N 85.8536°E
- Country: India
- State: Odisha
- District: Cuttack

Population (2001)
  - Total: 4,610

Languages
  - Official: Oriya
- Time zone: UTC+5:30 (IST)
- Vehicle registration: OD
- Website: odisha.gov.in

Belagachhia is a census town in Cuttack district in the state of Odisha, India.

== Demographics ==
As of 2001 India census, Belagachhia had a population of 4610. Males constitute 51% of the population and females 49%. Belagachhia has an average literacy rate of 74%, higher than the national average of 59.5%; with 56% of the males and 44% of females literate. 11% of the population is under 6 years of age.
