= Link Road, Cuttack =

Road in Cuttack, India

Coordinates: 20.448057°N 85.897464°E

Aerial view of link road

Link Road is a road in Cuttack, Odisha, India. It runs east from Link road cross at one end to Badambadi circle at the other.

Moving vehicles in Link road

Link Road is also one of the busiest roads in the city and is lined on one side with retail stores, banks, many public buildings including BSNL customer care office, Madhupatna police station and restaurants. It has many office buildings, shops and theaters. It is also a home to a large number of buildings, Schools & banks. Such as Nishamani cinema Hall, Agrawal eye hospital, Samrat cinema hall, Madhu Patna Puja Committee, Lic Branch and its Officers Quarters ,Sri Aurobindo Institute of Higher Studies and Research, Matrubhaban etc.

== Geography and location ==
Badambadi, one of Cuttack's busiest junctions and the location of an important bus terminal, Link Road starts. The road continues toward the end of NH-16 (which used to be NH-5), linking Cuttack to Bhubaneswar, the state capital, and several other cities in Odisha and beyond. It is an essential connection in the city's transportation system which links to other important city roads and bridges.

== Infrastructure and development ==
Link Road has seen significant growth over the years, including efforts for beautification and road development. Due to the growth of commercial buildings along its path, the road is now a busy place with many stores, offices, and restaurants lining it. Important places like Orissa High Court, BARABATI STADIUM, Netaji Birth Place Museum & SCB Medical College, one of the top hospitals in the area, are easy to reach via the route.

The CMC municipality has made improvements to improve road infrastructure, such as developing flyovers and improved pedestrian amenities, to meet the growing demand for traffic. In addition, techniques for managing traffic have been implemented to reduce traffic during peak times.

== Location ==
From badambadi it is around 2 km away.

It is situated in India, Odisha, Cuttack
