= Salipur Assembly constituency =

Constituency of the Odisha legislative assembly in India

Coordinates: 20.48°N 86.11°E

Salipur
- Constituency No. 94 for the Odisha Legislative Assembly

Constituency details
- Country: India
- Region: East India
- State: Odisha
- Division: Central Division
- District: Cuttack
- Lok Sabha constituency: Kendrapara
- Established: 1951
- Total electors: 2,49,033 (Note: as on 2024) (Note: as data published by election commission)
- Reservation: None

Member of Legislative Assembly
- 17th Odisha Legislative Assembly
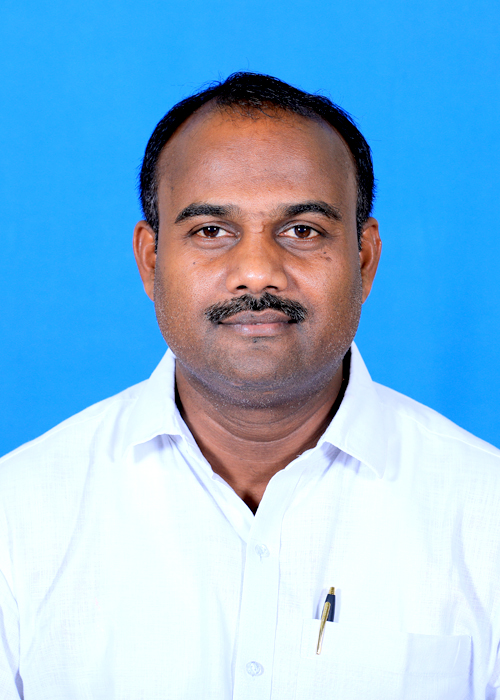
- Incumbent Prasanta Behera
- Party: Biju Janata Dal
- Elected year: 2024

Salipur is a Vidhan Sabha constituency of Cuttack district, Odisha.

This constituency includes Salepur block and 11 Gram panchayats (Govindpur, Jaripada, Harianta, Napanga, Bhatimunda, Kanheipur, Uchapada, Kotsahi, Garudagaon, Safa and Salagaon) of Tangi-Chowdwar block.

== Elected members ==
Vote share of winning candidates
| 2024 | 45.75% |
| 2019 | 56.26% |
| 2014 | 46.56% |
| 2009 | 47.35% |
| 2004 | 52.96% |
| 2000 | 53.64% |
| 1995 | 43.64% |
| 1990 | 75.97% |
| 1985 | 50.66% |
| 1980 | 58.82% |
| 1977 | 69.62% |

Since its formation in 1951, 17 elections have been held here till date. It was a 2-member constituency for the Odisha Legislative Assembly elections held in 1952 & 1957.

List of members elected from Salipur constituency are:

| Year | Member | Party |
|---|---|---|
| 2024 | Prasanta Behera | Biju Janata Dal |
| 2019 | Prasanta Behera | Biju Janata Dal |
| 2014 | Prakash Chandra Behera | Indian National Congress |
| 2009 | Chandra Sarathi Behera | Biju Janata Dal |
| 2004 | Kalindi Behera | Biju Janata Dal |
| 2000 | Kalindi Behera | Biju Janata Dal |
| 1995 | Rabindra Kumar Behera | Indian National Congress |
| 1990 | Kalindi Behera | Janata Dal |
| 1985 | Mayadhar Sethi | Indian National Congress |
| 1980 | Mayadhar Sethi | Indian National Congress (I) |
| 1977 | Kalindi Behera | Janata Party |
| 1974 | Baidhar Behera | Indian National Congress |
| 1971 | Batakrushna Jena | Utkal Congress |
| 1967 | Surendranath Patnaik | Orissa Jana Congress |
| 1961 | Baidhar Behera | Praja Socialist Party |
| 1957 (Note: It was a 2 member constituency) | Pradipta Kishore Das | Praja Socialist Party |
| 1957 | Baidhar Behera | Praja Socialist Party |
| 1951 (Note: It was a 2 member constituency) | Surendranath Patnaik | Indian National Congress |
| 1951 | Purnananda Samal | Indian National Congress |

== Election results ==
=== 2024 ===
Voting were held on 1 June 2024 in 4th phase of Odisha Assembly Election & 7th phase of Indian General Election. Counting of votes was on 4 June 2024. In 2024 election, Biju Janata Dal candidate Prasanta Behera defeated Bharatiya Janata Party candidate Arindam Roy by a margin of 7,594 votes.

2024 Odisha Vidhan Sabha Election, Salipur
| Party | Candidate | Votes | % | ±% |
|---|---|---|---|---|
| BJD | Prasanta Behera | 87,701 | 45.75 | ▼10.51 |
| BJP | Arindam Roy | 80,107 | 41.79 | ▲2.93 |
| INC | Aquibuzzama Khan | 19,930 | 10.40 | ▲7.42 |
| NOTA | None of the above | 926 | 0.48 | ▼0.07 |
| Majority | | 7,594 | 3.96 | |
| Turnout | | 1,91,697 | 76.98 | |
| BJD hold | | | | |

=== 2019 ===
In 2019 election, Biju Janata Dal candidate Prasanta Behera defeated Bharatiya Janata Party candidate Prakash Chandra Behera by a margin of 32,210 votes.

2019 Odisha Vidhan Sabha Election: Salipur
| Party | Candidate | Votes | % | ±% |
|---|---|---|---|---|
| BJD | Prasanta Behera | 104,218 | 56.26 | |
| BJP | Prakash Chandra Behera | 70,014 | 38.86 | |
| INC | Rabindra Nath Kar | 5,520 | 2.98 | |
| NOTA | None of the above | 763 | 0.41 | |
| Majority | | 32,210 | 17.4 (Note: % of total valid votes) | |
| Turnout | | 1,85,123 | 77.11 | |
| Registered electors | | 2,10,810 | | |
| BJD gain from INC | | | | |

=== 2014 ===
In 2014 election, Indian National Congress candidate Prakash Chandra Behera defeated Biju Janata Dal candidate Prasanta Behera by a margin of 2,117 votes.

2014 Odisha Vidhan Sabha Election, Salipur
| Party | Candidate | Votes | % | ±% |
|---|---|---|---|---|
| INC | Prakash Chandra Behera | 78,343 | 46.56 | |
| BJD | Prasanta Behera | 76,226 | 45.31 | |
| BJP | Choudhury Hemanta Kumar Sahu | 7,712 | 4.58 | |
| NOTA | None of the above | 950 | 0.56 | |
| Majority | | 2,117 | 1.25 (Note: % of total valid votes) | |
| Turnout | | 1,68,247 | 79.59 | |
| INC gain from BJD | | | | |

=== 2009 ===
In 2009 election, Biju Janata Dal candidate Chandra Sarathi Behera defeated Indian National Congress candidate Prakash Chandra Behera by a margin of 1,277 votes.

2009 Odisha Vidhan Sabha Election, Salipur
| Party | Candidate | Votes | % | ±% |
|---|---|---|---|---|
| BJD | Chandra Sarathi Behera | 66,375 | 47.35 | |
| INC | Prakash Chandra Behera | 65098 | 46.44 | |
| BJP | Om Prakash Ray | 5906 | 5.21 | |
| Majority | | 1,277 | 0.91 (Note: % of total valid votes) | |
| Turnout | | 1,40,190 | 70.16 | |
| BJD hold | | | | |
