= Pratap Jena =

Indian politician

- ପ୍ରତାପ ଜେନା
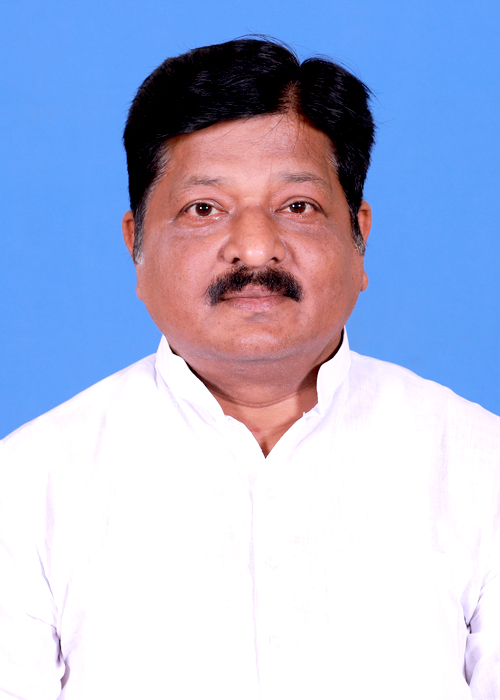

Cabinet Minister Odisha Legislative Assembly
- In office 2019–2022
- Minister: Minister of Panchayati Raj & Drinking Water, Law, Housing & Urban Development

Cabinet Minister Odisha Legislative Assembly
- In office 2017–2019
- Minister: Minister of Health and Family Welfare, Law, Information and Public Relations

Minister of State (Independent Charge) Odisha Legislative Assembly
- In office 2009–2012
- Minister: Minister of School and Mass Education

Member: Odisha Legislative Assembly
- In office 2000–2009
- Constituency: Kissanagar
- In office 2009–2024
- Preceded by: Bikram Keshari Barma
- Succeeded by: Sarada Prasad Padhan
- Constituency: Mahanga

Personal details
- Born: Pratap Jena; 3 June 1966 (age 60) Cuttack, Odisha
- Party: Biju Janata Dal
- Education: Ravenshaw University Madhusudan Law College
- Website: pratapjena.in
- Nickname: Lulu

Pratap Jena (Odia: ପ୍ରତାପ ଜେନା) is an Indian politician and a former Cabinet Minister in the Sixteenth Odisha Legislative Assembly, holding portfolios in Panchayati Raj & Drinking Water, Law, Housing & Urban Development (2019–2022). He has been elected as MLA from Mahanga for five consecutive terms and serves as the General Secretary of the Biju Krushak Janata Dal, the farmers' wing of the Biju Janata Dal. Previously, he held key ministerial positions, including Minister of School and Mass Education (2009–2012) and Minister of Health & Family Welfare, Law, and I&PR (2017–2019).

== Early life and education ==
Jena was born on June 3, 1966, in Cuttack, Odisha, to Shri Dushasan Jena and Smt. Saraswati Jena. He completed his schooling at Secondary Board High School in Cuttack. Then he pursued higher education at Ravenshaw University, where he earned a Bachelor of Science (B.Sc.) and a Master of Science (M.Sc.) in mathematics. He later obtained a Bachelor of Laws (L.L.B.) from Madhusudan Law College, Cuttack, and also completed a Post Graduate Diploma in Management (PGDM) from Cuttack.

== Political career ==
=== Student politics ===
Jena entered student politics in 1985 making his debut as the secretary of the Science Society of Ravenshaw College. He was elected as president of the students’ union of Madhusudan Law College, Cuttack, in 1990–91. He was the president of State Chhatra Janata Dal (student's wing of Janata Dal) from 1992 to 2002, having been appointed to the position by Lthe lte Biju Patnaik.

=== Assembly elections ===
In 2000, he contested the Odisha Legislative Assembly elections, contesting from Kissan Nagar constituency. He defeated Bira Kishore Parida of INC with a margin of 17,695 votes. He was re-elected from Kissan Nagar in 2004 Assembly elections, defeating Gurupada Nanda of INC by 24,768 votes. In 2009, he was elected for the third time, this time from Mahanga constituency, defeating Shaik Matlub Ali of INC by a margin of 29,220 votes. He became the School and Mass Education minister during this term. He was re-elected from Mahanga in 2014 Assembly elections, defeating Sarada Prasad Pradhan (Independent candidate) by 27,874 votes. In 2019, he was again re-elected from Mahanga with a margin of 29,585 votes and became the Cabinet Minister in Naveen Patnaik's ministry with important portfolios such as Panchayati Raj & Drinking Water, Law, Housing & Urban Development.

Recently he was conferred with the "Fame India Best Minister Award" at the Vigyan Bhavan in New Delhi.

=== Ministerial berths ===
Pratap Jena took oath as Minister of School and Mass Education after his party's victory in the 2009 assembly elections. He continued on this post until August 2012 after which he was replaced as a part of ministerial reshuffle.

His second stint as a minister came during the party's current tenure in the government. In a major reshuffle of the State Cabinet on 7 May 2017, Jena was assigned the portfolios of Health & Family Welfare and Law departments. The charge of Information and Public Relations was added to his portfolio during another reshuffle on 3 May 2018.

In May 2019, Jena was again elected to Odisha Legislative Assembly for the fifth consecutive time and became Cabinet Minister in Naveen Patnaik's fifth consecutive government with important portfolios such as Panchayati Raj & Drinking Water, Law, Housing & Urban Development.

=== Achievements ===
After taking charge as Health & Law Minister, there has been a thrust on development in the health sector said to be the most successful term in history of Health & Law Ministry. These include inauguration of Saheed Laxman Nayak Medical College and Hospital in Koraput, Pandit Raghunath Murmu Medical College and Hospital in Baripada, Bhima Bhoi Medical College & Hospital in Balangir, Fakir Mohan Medical College and Hospital in Balasore, District Headquarter hospital in Jharsuguda, 300 bedded District headquarters hospital building for Dhenkanal and Kendrapara district, 100-bed mother and child hospital in Angul, 30-bed ICU at SCB Medical College and Hospital, MoU with the Vedanta Group for a 500-bed medical college and hospital in Kalahandi district, MoU with Tata Trusts for cancer treatment and research hospital in Bhubaneswar and inauguration of multiple Urban primary health centres among others. New Medical college and Hospital are under construction in Kalahandi, Puri, Keonjhar. A new Medical College will be constructed at Jajpur in the next phase.

Under Jena's tenure as health minister, Odisha has become the first State in the country to have formulated the Universal Eye Health Programme (UEHP). In a first-of-its-kind health programme, the state aims at providing comprehensive, accessible, affordable and equitable eye care to people of all age groups. The Rs. 600 crore scheme will provide five lakh spectacles to students and 10 lakh cataract patients will be operated free of cost. Glaucoma patients will also be offered free treatment.

In June 2017, the Odisha state government took initiative to completely sponsor the expenses for separating Craniopagus twins Jaga-Balia. The state health department, in co-ordination with AIIMS and doctors from across the globe, ensured that the operation (successful in very rare cases) was a complete success. The surgery received major media attention and was considered as a medical marvel.

On 19 December 2017, Odisha government launched various pro people health schemes such as (1) NIDAAN for all types of essential diagnostic services provided free of cost to all categories of patients in all public health facilities as per its level from Sub-Centers to Medical Colleges and Hospitals. Annually over 1.50 crores patients requiring diagnostic services at public health facilities are being benefited. (2) SAHAY for free Dialysis Services. Annually about 50 thousand patients are being benefited. (3) AMA CLINIC for Healthcare services in Urban clinics including fixed day specialists services in Obstetrics and Gynecology, Pediatrics, Medicine and Geriatrics, Eye-care, Physiotherapy and Psychiatric. Urban population over 45 lakhs in 27 towns will be benefited under the scheme. (4) ANMOL to equip the ANMs with the latest technology, the government decided to provide the ANMOL tablet computers to all the ANMs. It will help in providing real-time service to the beneficiaries, especially pregnant women, mothers and newborns in the state.

In January 2018, Measles-Rubella (MR) vaccine was introduced in the state immunisation programme for the first time. The vaccination drive covered about 1.13 crore children across Odisha between the ages of nine months and 15 years. The 5-week long campaign involved 70,367 schools, 47,689 ASHAs, 71,129 Anganwadi workers, 8665 health workers and officials of state government departments and 37,160 outreach vaccination sessions.

On 26 February 2018 Government of Odisha launched Khushi scheme (meaning "Happiness" in Odia) to provide free sanitary pads to girl students in Odisha. It was launched by the Chief Minister of Odisha Naveen Patnaik. The Government of Odisha will spend 700 million Indian rupees annually for running this program in the state.

On 15 August 2018, Biju Swastya Kalyan Yojana was launched by Chief Minister of Odisha Naveen Patnaik. Under this scheme around 7 million families will get free health services in all state government health care facilities starting from Sub center level up to district headquarter hospital level. A budget of 2.50 billion was sanctioned by the state government. Annual health coverage of Rs 500,000 per family and 700,000 per women members of the family will be provided under this scheme at any hospital of India.

The minister has been noted for conducting unannounced visits to hospitals and health centres across the state to assess staff and institutional preparedness. These visits have been associated with increased alertness among officials and, in some cases, improvements in patient care.

As Law minister, Jena announced 115 new civil judge (junior division) and Judicial Magistrate First Class (JMFC) courts to be opened at block level to speed up the disposal of pending cases. This will also create 330 posts across categories for the courts.

== Personal life ==
On 29 May 1994, Pratap married Smt. Dezy Jena in Cuttack. The couple have a son and a daughter.

Jena was implicated in the Mahanga double murder case involving the killings of BJP leader Kulamani Baral and his associate Dibyasingha Baral on January 2, 2021. However, the Orissa High Court granted him a clean chit on October 1, 2024, quashing the lower court's order and ruling that the proceedings against him were unsustainable, as his name was not included in the charge sheet after two investigations.

Subsequently, the opposing party approached the Supreme Court of India challenging the High Court's decision. On October 15, 2026, the Supreme Court also granted him relief, upholding his exoneration in the case.

Mr. Jena is fielding his son Ankit Pratap Jena from BJD party ticket by not contesting the 2024 Odisha Legislative Assembly election.

== Positions held ==
(i) Chairman, Committee on Estimate, OLA
(ii) Member, Odisha Legislative Assembly (MLA) representing from Mahanga Assembly Constituency from 2009 until date.
(iii) Chairman, Paper-laid-on table Committee, Odisha Legislative Assembly.
(iv) Minister, School & Mass Education, Govt. of Odisha, Bhubaneswar.(2009–2012)
(v) Member, Odisha Legislative Assembly(MLA) Representing from Kissan Nagar Assembly Constituency from 2004 to 2009.
(vi) MLA, Representing from Kissan Nagar Assembly Constituency from 2000 to 2004.
(vii) Chairman, District Planning Committee, Anugul.
(viii) Member General Council, NCERT.
(ix) Chairman, Orissa Small Industries Corporation (OSIC), Cuttack.
(x) Chairman, Standing Committee of Industries, Steel & Mines, Forest & Environment, Transport & Commerce, Planning & Co-ordination Department, Govt. of Odisha of OLA.
(xi) President, Student's union, MS Law College, Cuttack(1990–91).
(xii) President, State Chhatra Janata Dal, the Student Wing of Janata dal (1992–97).
(xiii) State President, Biju Chhatra Janata Dal, the Student wing of BJD (1997–2002).
(xiv) Science Society Secretary of Ravenshaw College, Cuttack. (1985–86)
(xv) Member Telephony Advisory Committee (TAC) for Cuttack district.
(xvi) Member, Railway users Consultative Committee of Khurda division.
(xvii) Assurance Committee, Amenities Committee of OLA(2000–04).
(xviii) Member, Library Committee of OLA.
(xix) Member, Public Accounts Committee of OLA.
(xx) Member, Petition Committee of OLA.
(xxi) Member, Governing Body of Board of Secondary Education, Orissa, Cuttack.
(xxii) Member, OSRTC Board, Bhubaneswar.
(xxiii) President, All Orissa Electrical Employees(GED) Association.
(xxv) President Employee's Union of Seeds Corporation of Orissa, Bhubaneswar.
