= Dharmananda Behera =

Indian politician

Member: Odisha Legislative Assembly
- In office 2004–2009
- Preceded by: Bidhubhusan Praharaj
- Succeeded by: Pravat Ranjan Biswal
- Constituency: Choudwar-Cuttack

Personal details
- Born: 19 May 1949 (age 76) Shankarpur, Choudwar, Odisha, India
- Party: Biju Janata Dal
- Spouse: Parbati Behera
- Children: 4 (Including Prasanta Behera)
- Parent: Raj Kishore Behera (father)
- Profession: Politician, Social Worker

Dharmananda Behera is a politician from Odisha. He was a former Member of Legislative Assembly of Choudwar-Cuttack.

== Early life ==
Dharmananda Behera was born in 1949 in a Hindu Gopal (Yadav) family. His father is Raj Kishore Behera.
