= Prasanta Behera =

Indian politician

Member of Odisha Legislative Assembly
- Incumbent
- Assumed office April 2019
- Preceded by: Prakash Chandra Behera
- Constituency: Salipur

Personal details
- Born: Prasanta Behera; 1 May 1977 (age 48) Shankarpur, Choudwar, Odisha, India
- Party: Biju Janata Dal
- Spouse: Subasini Behera
- Children: 1 son
- Parents: Dharmananda Behera (father); Parbati Behera (mother)
- Education: Bachelor of Science
- Profession: Politician, Social Worker

Prasanta Behera is a Politician from Odisha in India. He is serving as M.L.A. of Salipur since 2019.

== Early life ==
Prasanta Behera was born in 1977 in a Gopal (Yadav) family. His father Dharmananda Behera is a veteran Politician and former M.L.A. of Choudwar-Cuttack Vidhan sabha constituency. He did his schooling at Kamalakanta Vidyapitha, Cuttack and bachelor's degree in Science at Choudwar College, Choudwar.

== Political career ==
In 2014 Vidhan sabha elections Prasanta Behera contested as a candidate of Biju Janata Dala for Salipur constituency, but lost to INC's candidate Prakash Chandra Behera by a margin of 2117 votes.

In 2019 Vidhan sabha elections Prasanta successfully won by defeating BJP's Prakash Chandra Behera.
