= Sarada Prasad Padhan =

Indian politician

Sarada Pradhan

Member of Odisha Legislative Assembly
- Incumbent
- Assumed office 4 June 2024
- Preceded by: Pratap Jena
- Constituency: Mahanga

Personal details
- Born: Sarada Prasad Pradhan; July 27, 1978 (age 48) Podamarai, Mahanga, Odisha, India
- Spouse: Sipra Priyadarshini Bal
- Parent: Brajabandhu Pradhan (father)
- Profession: Politician, Cultivation, Social Service
- Nickname: Bulu

Sarada Prasad Padhan is an Indian politician from Odisha. He is a Member of the Odisha Legislative Assembly from 2024, representing Mahanga Assembly constituency as an Independent candidate.

In both the 2014 and 2019 Odisha Legislative Assembly elections, he contested against Pratap Jena—first as an independent and later as a BJP candidate—but was defeated both times. He secured victory in the 2024 Odisha Legislative Assembly elections, defeating Ankit Pratap Jena and marking his first electoral success as an independent legislator.

== Political career ==
His father, Brajabandhu Padhan, had served multiple terms as Sarpanch of Podamarai Grama Panchayat. He initially belonged to the Biju Janata Dal (BJD) in Mahanga but was sidelined when Pratap Jena emerged as a key political figure in the region. Following his marginalization within the party, he launched his own movement with name Mahanga Vikash Parishad (MVP) as an independent leader.

In the 2014 Odisha Legislative Assembly elections, he contested as an independent candidate against Pratap Jena but was defeated. Later, he joined the Bharatiya Janata Party (BJP) in 2018 and ran again in the 2019 elections, facing Pratap Jena once more but was again unsuccessful.

He was considered to be close to Union Cabinet Minister Dharmendra Pradhan, but due to internal political dynamics, he was denied a BJP ticket for the 2024 elections. As a result, he contested as an independent candidate, with his major opponent being Ankit Pratap Jena of BJD.

== Marriage ==
Pradhan married Sipra Priyadarshini Bal on March 2, 2025, in Jaipur, Rajasthan. Bal is a trainee officer with the Odisha Administrative Service (OAS) and previously worked as a social extension officer in Mahanga and Nishchintkoili Blocks.

== See also ==
- 2024 Odisha Legislative Assembly election
- Odisha Legislative Assembly
