= Jatra (Odisha) =

Oriya theater performance in Odisha

Jatra (Odia: ଯାତ୍ରା) is a type of Odia theater performance in the Indian state of Odisha. The Jatra season begins from autumn and continues until the monsoon months of June. The Jatra is usually performed on an open-air stage with an audience seated on all sides. The performance includes play, music and dance.

== Origin ==
The origin of Jatra is variously attributed to the Natya Shastra and the rise of Vaishnavism in Odisha by 16th cen CE. The Odia jatra tradition has evolved and diversified through centuries from stories based on the epics with theater performance in Odisha based on stories of Mahabharata and Ramayana and later modern plays were also included. Jatra was revived during the period of Baishṇaba Pāṇi with the introduction of "gitinatya" (musical performance).

The Odishan jatras are very popular across Odisha across rural settings mostly focused on mythological themes.
