= Baishnaba Pani =

Baishnaba Pani (1882–1956) was an Indian writer and arranger of jatras, a type of folk-theatre in the state of Odisha.

== Early life ==
He was born at Kothapada, Mahanga, Cuttack, Odisha.

== Career ==
Pani introduced "gitinatya" (musical performance) for the first time in Odia-language jatra. Some of his popular jatra stories include "Saudagara Farce", "Abu Hussain Farce", and "'Natua Mohanty Farce".

== Bibliography ==
Gītināṭẏa, Gītābhinaẏa and Suāṅga

- Raṅgasabhā gītināṭẏa
- Naḷadamaẏantī gītināṭẏa
- Rābaṇa badha gītināṭẏa
- Bakāsura badha gītināṭẏa
- Bakāsura badha gītināṭẏa
- Duryẏōdhana badha gītināṭẏa
- Brajalīḷā suāṅga
- Dhruba charita suāṅga
- Kīcakabadha suāṅga
- Dānabīra hariścandra suāṅga
- Sābitrī satẏabāna suāṅga
- Nikuñca miḷana suāṅga
- Pārbatī bibāha suāṅga
- Raghu arakṣita nābakēḷi suāṅga
- Muktācōri suāṅga
- Harapārbatī bibhā suāṅga
- Prahallāda carita gītābhinaẏa
- Dāṇḍiparba gītābhinaẏa
- Lakṣmī pūjā gītābhinaẏa
- Mahiṣāsura badha
- Sahasrā rābaṇa badha
- Bālẏalīḷā-
- Subhadrā haraṇa
- Mādhaba sulōcanā
- Srībatsa rājā bā śani lakṣmī kaḷi
- Jarāsandha badha
