= COVID-19 pandemic in Odisha =

Ongoing COVID-19 viral pandemic in Odisha, India

- Disease: COVID-19
- Pathogen: SARS-CoV-2
- Location: Odisha, India
- First outbreak: Wuhan, China
- Index case: Bhubaneswar
- Arrival date: 16 March 2020 – ongoing (6 years, 8 months and 5 days)
- Confirmed cases: 10,00,084
- Active cases: 9,497
- Recovered: 9,83,245
- Deaths: 7,289, 53 (Other than COVID-19)
- Territories: All 30 districts: Angul, Balangir, Balasore, Baragarh, Bhadrak, Boudh, Cuttack, Deogarh, Dhenkanal, Gajapati, Ganjam, Jagatsinghpur, Jajpur, Jharsuguda, Kalahandi, Kandhamal, Kendrapara, Keonjhar, Khordha, Koraput, Malkangiri, Mayurbhanj, Nawarangpur, Nayagarh, Nuapada, Puri, Rayagada, Sambalpur, Sonepur, Sundergarh

Government website
- statedashboard.odisha.gov.in

The first case of the COVID-19 pandemic was confirmed in the Indian state of Odisha on 16 March 2020. The state has confirmed 10,00,084 cases, including 9,497 active cases, 9,83,245 recoveries, and 7,289 deaths as of 21 August 2021.

== Containment Strategy ==
In Cuttack, the Cuttack Municipal Corporation has formed a strategy wherein the city has been divided into three zones and officials have been deployed in order to ensure lockdown guidelines.

== Public Health Strategy ==
To lay more emphasis on testing, Director of National Health Mission (NHM) in Odisha has proposed a strategy to let social welfare workers go door-to-door to test people for COVID-19 symptoms. The strategy is to be implemented in rural areas and slums of urban areas as well.

== Immediate NGO Relief ==
Bhubaneswar Municipal Corporation (BMC) has partnered with 28 stores to ensure supplies are distributed to residents in the city in the midst of a lockdown. Some of these stores include Reliance Fresh, Big Bazaar, Vishal Mega Mart, Aadhar Fresh.

Rourkela Municipal Corporation collaborated with different NGOs to deliver thousands of cooked food packets to the needy and destitute persons in the city. The corporation has also taken measures for home delivery of grocery items and medicines. A list of Medicine Stores, that have agreed for home delivery of medicines in their concerned area of operation.

== Public awareness Campaigns ==
As per Deccan Herald, Chief Secretary A K Tripathy issued directions to Information and Public Relation, Panchayati Raj and Drinking Water, Women and Child Development and Mission Shakti Departments to intensify IEC (Information, Education and Communication) activities with the active involvement of the community. The progress for the special awareness campaign "Mu bi Covid Joddha" (I am also a Covid warrior) was checked upon and an order to intensify the campaign has been passed.

An active involvement of women self help groups, panchayati raj institutions, farmer producer groups and school management committees have been established. The themes of the campaign include personal hygiene, hand washing use of mask, social distancing, care of the old and vulnerable, eradication of social stigma, self- monitoring, and community surveillance quarantine.

== Economy ==
Due to COVID-19, economic activities in rural areas have been hit hard with rabi crops being completely ruined. To revive the agricultural economy, a meeting was held in May 2020, chaired by Chief Minister Naveen Patnaik. The State Government assured to increase the supply of fertilizers, seeds and other necessary agricultural machinery, and activities such as fish farming, poultry farming, horticulture, and dairy farming are reviving gradually. Additionally, activities to introduce more labor-intensive programs in different sector have been initiated by Departments of Water Resources, Rural Development, Works and Forest and Environment.

Other industries like IT and MSME sectors are also affected. With US and Europe suffering as well, very little projects are being renewed in IT industry and employees are being laid off.

Since 92% of the state's total workforce is in unorganized sector (approx. 1.62 crore people), livelihood and employment have become extremely challenging.

== Education ==
The shutting down of school and education facilities have not only affected students, parents and teachers but also the economy of the country. In Odisha, commissioner-cum-secretary, Saswat Mishra, advised the Vice chancellors of all the universities to shift to online classes and vacate the hostel premises.

The state was also ready to provide online education to the rural areas. Binayak Acharya, with the help of ThinkZone, had already been developing a home-based model of learning for parents to engage their children. He collaborated his model with the State Government and utilizing the resources and outreach, the program was adopted in various parts of the state.

In April 2020, the state government along with UNICEF provided a fun-filled calendar list of events to keep more than 16 lakh children involved in a positive way during lockdown. The program emphasizes reaching out to parents to keep their kids actively engaged through action songs, dance, painting and storytelling based on the month's prescribed theme. It even laid down the habits of following social distancing in an easier fashion that could be understood by children. Furthermore, for families with no internet facilities, printed copies of the calendar are being provided.

On 12 June 2020, the state government decided to cancel all pending exams at university level for the session 2019–2020. A provision was made for students to reappear for exams in November if they were unsatisfied with their grades.

== Migrant Workers Crisis ==
Odisha prepared an online database of returning migrants since the first case was discovered in the state. Due to this, the state government knew that approx 78,233 persons had returned from other states to Odisha on the day of the national lockdown, with district and panchayat specifically tallied. The panchayat members encouraged the returning migrants to self-isolate themselves. In order to ensure their period of quarantine, the state announced a cash incentive of Rs. 15,000 to all those who completed self-isolation keeping the guidelines in mind and following the correct procedures issued by the government.

== Statistics ==
COVID-19 pandemic In Odisha By Districts
Sl. No.	Districts	Active	Recovered	Deaths	Deaths Other Than COVID-19	Total Cases	First Case	Notes	Total RT PCR Tests
01	Angul	236	10,637	157	00	10,910	09/05/2020	27th Death in Odisha.	1,73,44,608
02	Balangir	150	8,340	74	00	8,529	01/05/2020	337th Death in Odisha.	1,73,44,608
03	Balasore	131	11,833	122	05	12,063	18/04/2020	133rd Death in Odisha.	1,73,44,608
04	Baragarh	121	9,995	79	00	10,156	24/05/2020	14th Death in Odisha.	1,73,44,608
05	Bhadrak	28	7,352	41	04	7,409	31/03/2020	52nd Death in Odisha.	1,73,44,608
06	Boudh	10	2,752	71	00	2,773	10/05/2020	638th Death in Odisha.	1,73,44,608
07	Cuttack	221	28,405	217	04	28,769	03/04/2020	5th Death in Odisha.	1,73,44,608
08	Deogarh	15	1,257	29	00	1,277	29/04/2020	946th Death in Odisha.	1,73,44,608
09	Dhenkanal	07	5,660	53	00	5,696	08/04/2020	240th Death in Odisha.	1,73,44,608
10	Gajapati	03	3,941	67	01	3,977	22/05/2020	35th Death In Odisha.	1,73,44,608
11	Ganjam	19	21,535	302	08	21,808	02/05/2020	3rd Death in Odisha.	1,73,44,608
12	Jagatsinghpur	42	9,002	61	00	9,082	06/05/2020	88th Death in Odisha.	1,73,44,608
13	Jajpur	129	11,819	38	01	11,974	03/04/2020	38th Death in Odisha.	1,73,44,608
14	Jharsuguda	79	7,392	91	00	7,497	29/04/2020	136th Death in Odisha.	1,73,44,608
15	Kalahandi	36	6,241	152	00	6,308	04/04/2020	197th Death in Odisha.	1,73,44,608
16	Kandhamal	5	5,888	44	00	5,926	17/05/2020	108th Death in Odisha.	1,73,44,608
17	Kendrapara	131	8,893	67	01	9,053	06/04/2020	43rd Death In Odisha.	1,73,44,608
18	Keonjhar	69	7,776	65	02	7,882	29/04/2020	223rd Death In Odisha.	1,73,44,608
19	Khordha	147	52,247	543	10	52,728	16/03/2020	1st Death In Odisha.	1,73,44,608
20	Koraput	39	7,800	44	00	7,855	27/04/2020	263rd Death In Odisha.	1,73,44,608
21	Malkangiri	12	5,183	36	03	5,222	19/05/2020	147th Death In Odisha.	1,73,44,608
22	Mayurbhanj	119	13,714	109	03	13,925	06/05/2020	236th Death in Odisha.	1,73,44,608
23	Nawarangpur	14	5,776	42	02	5,806	22/05/2020	227th Death in Odisha.	1,73,44,608
24	Nayagarh	23	6,387	61	02	6,456	09/05/2020	91st Death in Odisha.	1,73,44,608
25	Nuapada	88	7,219	64	00	7,334	23/05/2020	734th Death In Odisha.	1,73,44,608
26	Puri	13	13,864	179	03	13,997	03/04/2020	12th Death In Odisha.	1,73,44,608
27	Rayagada	18	8,305	133	00	8,368	02/06/2020	45th Death In Odisha.	1,73,44,608
28	Sambalpur	191	9,117	100	00	9,384	16/05/2020	160th Death In Odisha.	1,73,44,608
29	Sonepur	09	4,669	35	00	4,699	25/05/2020	343rd Death In Odisha.	1,73,44,608
30	Sundergarh	317	14,199	312	04	14,686	11/04/2020	36th Death In Odisha.	1,73,44,608
31	State Pool	83	8,234	00	00	8,317	dd/06/2020	No Recoveries. No Deaths.	1,73,44,608
Total (All 30 districts, Including State Pool)		9,497	9,83,245	7,289	53	10,00,084	First Case In Odisha (16/03/2020)	All 30 Districts, Including State Pool	1,73,44,608 (17.34 M)
As of 21/08/2021 : 12:30 PM IST (Updates Every Day Between 10:00 AM To 12:00 PM IST); Source: Covid-19 State Homepage Covid-19 Dashboard District Wise Details

Gender Wise Details On COVID-19
Gender	Cases	% of Total
Male	3,16,636	65.99
Female	1,63,116	34.01
Total	4,79,752	100.00%

Age Wise Details On COVID-19
Age	Cases	% of Total
0-14 Years	24,201	5.05
15-40 Years	2,49,819	52.07
41-60 Years	1,55,405	32.39
Above 60 Years	50,327	10.49
Total	4,79,752	100.00%

Lockdown Zone By Districts In Odisha
Districts	Zone	No. Of Districts
All Districts	Red	30
Total Districts	30	

== COVID-19 Vaccines with Approval for Emergency or Conditional Usage ==
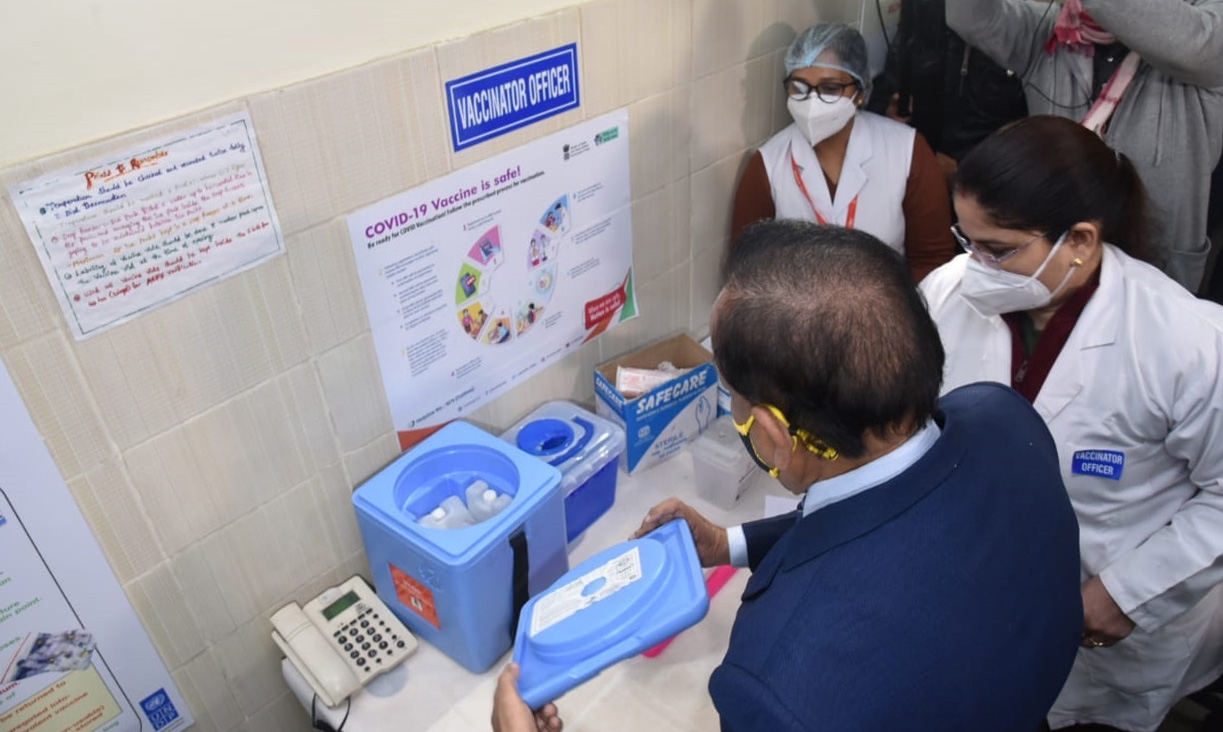
Union Minister for Health & Family Welfare, Dr. Harsh Vardhan visiting the GTB Hospital, Shahdara to review the preparedness of Dry Run of COVID-19 vaccine, in Delhi on January 02, 2021.

Covishield

On 1 January 2021, the Drug Controller General of India, approved the emergency or conditional use of AstraZeneca's COVID-19 vaccine AZD1222 (marketed as Covishield). Covishield is developed by the University of Oxford and its spin-out company, Vaccitech. It's a viral vector vaccine based on replication-deficient Adenovirus that causes cold in Chimpanzees.

Covaxin

On 2 January 2021, BBV152 (marketed as Covaxin), first indigenous vaccine, developed by Bharat Biotech in association with the Indian Council of Medical Research and National Institute of Virology received approval from the Drug Controller General of India for its emergency or conditional usage.
