= Mahanga Assembly constituency =

Constituency of the Odisha legislative assembly in India

Coordinates: 20.55°N 86.19°E

Mahanga
- Constituency No. 95 for the Odisha Legislative Assembly

Constituency details
- Country: India
- Region: East India
- State: Odisha
- Division: Central Division
- District: Cuttack
- Lok Sabha constituency: Kendrapara
- Established: 1951
- Total electors: 2,71,535 (Note: as on 2024) (Note: as data published by election commission)
- Reservation: None

Member of Legislative Assembly
- 17th Odisha Legislative Assembly
- Incumbent Sarada Prasad Padhan
- Party: Independent
- Elected year: 2024

Mahanga is a Vidhan Sabha constituency located in the Cuttack district, Odisha. The constituency falls under the Kendrapara Lok Sabha constituency. The constituency comprises the Mahanga and Nischintakoili community development blocks and covers a predominantly rural region situated in the deltaic plains of coastal Odisha.

Established in 1951, this constituency includes the Mahanga block and 26 Gram panchayats in the Nischintakoili block. The constituency covers the following gram panchayats: Fagola, Ramakrushnpur, Jignipur, Nischintakoili, Narendrapur, Nagaspur, Daudpur, Sukarpada, Asureswar, Taratasasan, Palisahi, Jamara, Orti, Kentalo, Baliapada, Kerilo, Buhalo, Kendupatana, Jhadeswarpur, Bandhakatia, Natakai, Kolanpur, Katikata, Katarpara, Jairampur, Barado and Sarapada Nischintakoili block.

== Administrative composition ==
The constituency consists of Mahanga Block and Nischintakoili Block in Cuttack district. Together, these administrative units comprise 78 Gram Panchayats and approximately 389 villages. The area is characterized by an extensive network of rivers, canals and agricultural lands associated with the Mahanadi delta system.

GP SL No.	Block	Local SL. No.	Gram Panchayat
1	Mahanga	1	Anandapur
2	Mahanga	2	Bajapura
3	Mahanga	3	Barahipur
4	Mahanga	4	Basudevpur
5	Mahanga	5	Bhadreswar
6	Mahanga	6	Bhaunria
7	Mahanga	7	Bheda
8	Mahanga	8	Chahapada
9	Mahanga	9	Gokan
10	Mahanga	10	Gopalpur
11	Mahanga	11	Gotara
12	Mahanga	12	Haladia
13	Mahanga	13	Jaleswarpur
14	Mahanga	14	Kaitha
15	Mahanga	15	Koliatha
16	Mahanga	16	Kuhunda
17	Mahanga	17	Kundi
18	Mahanga	18	Kurujanga
19	Mahanga	19	Kusupur
20	Mahanga	20	Lalitagiri
21	Mahanga	21	Madhupur
22	Mahanga	22	Mahanga
23	Mahanga	23	Mouda
24	Mahanga	24	Mulabasanta
25	Mahanga	25	Nahanga
26	Mahanga	26	Nurtang
27	Mahanga	27	Osanga
28	Mahanga	28	Paikarapur
29	Mahanga	29	Palisahi
30	Mahanga	30	Panaspur
31	Mahanga	31	Podmarai
32	Mahanga	32	Rahania
33	Mahanga	33	Sahapur
34	Mahanga	34	Samasarpur
35	Mahanga	35	Srikrushnapur
36	Mahanga	36	Umar
37	Mahanga	37	Usuma
38	Nischintakoili	1	Asureswar
39	Nischintakoili	2	Babujanga
40	Nischintakoili	3	Badakhira
41	Nischintakoili	4	Baliapada
42	Nischintakoili	5	Bandhakatia
43	Nischintakoili	6	Bandhupur
44	Nischintakoili	7	Barada
45	Nischintakoili	8	Buhalo
46	Nischintakoili	9	Duadpur
47	Nischintakoili	10	Fogal
48	Nischintakoili	11	Isani Brahmapur
49	Nischintakoili	12	Jairampur
50	Nischintakoili	13	Jamara
51	Nischintakoili	14	Janardanpur
52	Nischintakoili	15	Jhadeswarpur
53	Nischintakoili	16	Jiginpur
54	Nischintakoili	17	Kalamishiri
55	Nischintakoili	18	Kalanpur
56	Nischintakoili	19	Kantarpada
57	Nischintakoili	20	Katikata
58	Nischintakoili	21	Kenduapatna
59	Nischintakoili	22	Kentalo
60	Nischintakoili	23	Kerilo
61	Nischintakoili	24	Mahammadpur
62	Nischintakoili	25	Manapur
63	Nischintakoili	26	Manijanga
64	Nischintakoili	27	Nagaspur
65	Nischintakoili	28	Narendrapur
66	Nischintakoili	29	Natkai
67	Nischintakoili	30	Nimalo
68	Nischintakoili	31	Nischintakoili
69	Nischintakoili	32	Orti
70	Nischintakoili	33	Palda
71	Nischintakoili	34	Ramakrushnapur
72	Nischintakoili	35	Santapur
73	Nischintakoili	36	Sarapada
74	Nischintakoili	37	Sirlo
75	Nischintakoili	38	Sukarpada
76	Nischintakoili	39	Taritasasan
77	Nischintakoili	40	Tilakana
78	Nischintakoili	41	Utarkul

== Geography ==
Mahanga constituency is situated in the eastern part of Cuttack district and forms part of the broader coastal belt of Odisha. The region is traversed by several distributaries and tributaries of the Mahanadi river system, contributing to its fertile alluvial plains. Agriculture remains the predominant economic activity, with paddy cultivation being the principal crop.

== Political significance ==
The constituency has been represented by leaders from different political parties since its formation and has played a significant role in the electoral politics of coastal Odisha. Owing to its location between Cuttack and Kendrapara districts, electoral trends in the constituency often reflect broader political developments in the region.

== Elected members ==
Vote share of winning candidates
2024	42.86%
2019	53.13%
2014	49.34%
2009	56.82%
2004	53.42%
2000	50.52%
1995	51.69%
1990	57.84%
1985	52.66%
1980	49.05%
1977	63.83%

Since its formation in 1951, 17 elections were held till date including one bypoll in 1955.

List of members elected from Mahanga constituency are:

Year	Member	Party
2024	Sarada Prasad Padhan	Independent politician
2019	Pratap Jena	Biju Janata Dal
2014	Pratap Jena	Biju Janata Dal
2009	Pratap Jena	Biju Janata Dal
2004	Bikram Keshari Barma	Biju Janata Dal
2000	Sarat Kumar Kar	Biju Janata Dal
1995	Sk. Matlub Ali	Indian National Congress
1990	Sarat Kumar Kar	Janata Dal
1985	Sk. Matlub Ali	Indian National Congress
1980	Sk. Matlub Ali	Indian National Congress (I)
1977	Pradipta Kishore Das	Janata Party
1974	Sk. Matlub Ali	Indian National Congress
1971	Sarat Kumar Kar	Utkal Congress
1967	Biraja Prasad Ray	Praja Socialist Party
1961	Surendranath Patnaik	Orissa Jana Congress
1957-1960 : Constituency didn't exist
1955 (bypoll) (Note: Resignation of Mahammad Attahar)	Pradipta Kishore Das	Praja Socialist Party
1951	Mahammad Attahar	Indian National Congress

== Election results ==
=== 2024 ===
Voting was held on 1 June 2024 in the 4th phase of the Odisha Assembly Election & 7th phase of Indian General Election. Counting was conducted on 4 June 2024. Independent candidate Sarada Prasad Padhan defeated Biju Janata Dal candidate Ankit Pratap Jena by a margin of 7,423 votes.

2024 Vidhan Sabha Election, Mahanga
Party	Candidate	Votes	%	±%
Independent	Sarada Prasad Padhan	88,632	42.86	
BJD	Ankit Pratap Jena	81,209	39.27	▼14.00
BJP	Sumant Kumar Ghadei	19,481	9.42	▼28.99
INC	Debendra Kumar Sahoo	14,796	7.15	▼0.35
NOTA	None of the above	525	0.25	▼0.03
Majority		7,423	3.59 (Note: % of total valid votes)	▼11.31
Turnout		2,06,802	76.16	
Independent gain from BJD				

=== 2019 ===
In 2019 election, Biju Janata Dal candidate Pratap Jena defeated Bharatiya Janata Party candidate Sarada Prasad Pradhan by a margin of 27,874 votes.

2019 Vidhan Sabha Election, Mahanga
Party	Candidate	Votes	%	±%
BJD	Pratap Jena	106,054	53.27	▲3.94
BJP	Sarada Prasad Padhan	76,469	38.41	▲4.43
INC	Debendra Kumar Sahoo	14,922	7.5	▼26.01
NOTA	None of the above	564	0.28	
Majority		29,585	14.9 (Note: % of total valid votes)	
Turnout		1,99,062	76.64	
Registered electors		2,61,545		
BJD hold				

=== 2014 ===
In 2014 election, Biju Janata Dal candidate Pratap Jena defeated Independent candidate Sarada Prasad Padhan by a margin of 27,874 votes.

2014 Vidhan Sabha Election, Mahanga
Party	Candidate	Votes	%	±%
BJD	Pratap Jena	89,531	49.34	▼7.48
Independent	Sarada Prasad Padhan	61,657	33.98	
INC	Sk. Matlub Ali	22,297	12.29	▼26.01
BJP	Samir Kumar Samal	3,572	1.97	▼1.87
NOTA	None of the above	1,074	0.59	−
Majority		27,874	15.45 (Note: % of total valid votes)	−
Turnout		1,81,462	76.64	
Registered electors		2,36,778		
BJD hold				

=== 2009 ===
In 2009 election, Biju Janata Dal candidate Pratap Jena defeated Indian National Congress candidate Sk. Matlub Ali by a margin of 29,220 votes.

2009 Vidhan Sabha Election, Mahanga
Party	Candidate	Votes	%	±%
BJD	Pratap Jena	89,628	56.82	−
INC	Sk. Matlub Ali	60,408	38.30	−
BJP	Choudhury Pravatkeshari Mishra	6,050	3.84	−
Turnout		1,57,747	70.87	▼4.88
Registered electors		2,22,602		
BJD hold				

== Notable offices held by MLAs ==
The following members elected from the Mahanga Assembly constituency have served in the Council of Ministers of the Government of Odisha or as Speaker of the Odisha Legislative Assembly.

Legislative Assembly	Member	Position	Portfolio / Office	From	To
16th Odisha Legislative Assembly (2019–2024)	Pratap Jena	Cabinet Minister	Law	29 May 2019	5 June 2022
16th Odisha Legislative Assembly (2019–2024)	Pratap Jena	Cabinet Minister	Panchayati Raj & Drinking Water	29 May 2019	5 June 2022
16th Odisha Legislative Assembly (2019–2024)	Pratap Jena	Cabinet Minister	Housing & Urban Development	29 May 2019	5 June 2022
15th Odisha Legislative Assembly (2014–2019)	Pratap Jena	Cabinet Minister	Law	7 May 2017	29 May 2019
15th Odisha Legislative Assembly (2014–2019)	Pratap Jena	Cabinet Minister	Information & Public Relations	3 March 2018	29 May 2019
14th Odisha Legislative Assembly (2009–2014)	Pratap Jena	Minister of State (Independent Charge)	School & Mass Education	21 May 2009	2 August 2012
12th Odisha Legislative Assembly (2000–2004)	Sarat Kumar Kar	Speaker	—	10 March 2000	21 May 2004
11th Odisha Legislative Assembly (1995–2000)	Sk. Matlub Ali	Cabinet Minister	Rural Development	24 August 1998	17 February 1999
11th Odisha Legislative Assembly (1995–2000)	Sk. Matlub Ali	Cabinet Minister	Food Supplies & Consumer Welfare	22 February 1999	6 December 1999
11th Odisha Legislative Assembly (1995–2000)	Sk. Matlub Ali	Cabinet Minister	School & Mass Education	22 February 1999	6 December 1999
11th Odisha Legislative Assembly (1995–2000)	Sk. Matlub Ali	Cabinet Minister	Higher Education	9 December 1999	5 March 2000
11th Odisha Legislative Assembly (1995–2000)	Sk. Matlub Ali	Cabinet Minister	Public Grievances & Pension Administration	9 December 1999	5 March 2000
10th Odisha Legislative Assembly (1990–1995)	Sarat Kumar Kar	Cabinet Minister	Sports & Culture	1 January 1991	15 March 1995
10th Odisha Legislative Assembly (1990–1995)	Sarat Kumar Kar	Cabinet Minister	Youth Services	1 January 1991	15 March 1995
10th Odisha Legislative Assembly (1990–1995)	Sarat Kumar Kar	Cabinet Minister	Information & Public Relations	1 January 1991	4 January 1993
9th Odisha Legislative Assembly (1985–1990)	Sk. Matlub Ali	Cabinet Minister	Irrigation & Power	1 September 1986	7 December 1989
9th Odisha Legislative Assembly (1985–1990)	Sk. Matlub Ali	Cabinet Minister	Parliamentary Affairs (General Administration)	1 September 1986	7 December 1989
9th Odisha Legislative Assembly (1985–1990)	Sk. Matlub Ali	Cabinet Minister	Education & Youth Services	7 December 1989	5 March 1990

=== Summary by MLA ===
MLA	Total Portfolios Held	Highest Position	Party	Legislative Assemblies Served
Pratap Jena	6	Cabinet Minister	BJD	14th, 15th, 16th
Sk. Matlub Ali	8	Cabinet Minister	INC	9th, 11th
Sarat Kumar Kar	4	Speaker / Cabinet Minister	Janata Dal, BJD	10th, 12th
