= Souvic Biswal =

Indian politician

Member of Odisha Legislative Assembly
- Incumbent
- Assumed office 2019
- Preceded by: Pravat Ranjan Biswal
- Constituency: Choudwar-Cuttack

Personal details
- Born: March 22, 1992 (age 34)
- Party: Biju Janata Dal
- Profession: Politician

Souvic Biswal is an Indian Politician from Odisha. He is a Member of the Odisha Legislative Assembly from 2019, representing Choudwar-Cuttack Assembly constituency as a Member of the Biju Janata Dal.

== See also ==
- 2019 Odisha Legislative Assembly election
- Odisha Legislative Assembly
