= Sri Aurobindo Institute of Higher Studies and Research, Matrubhaban =

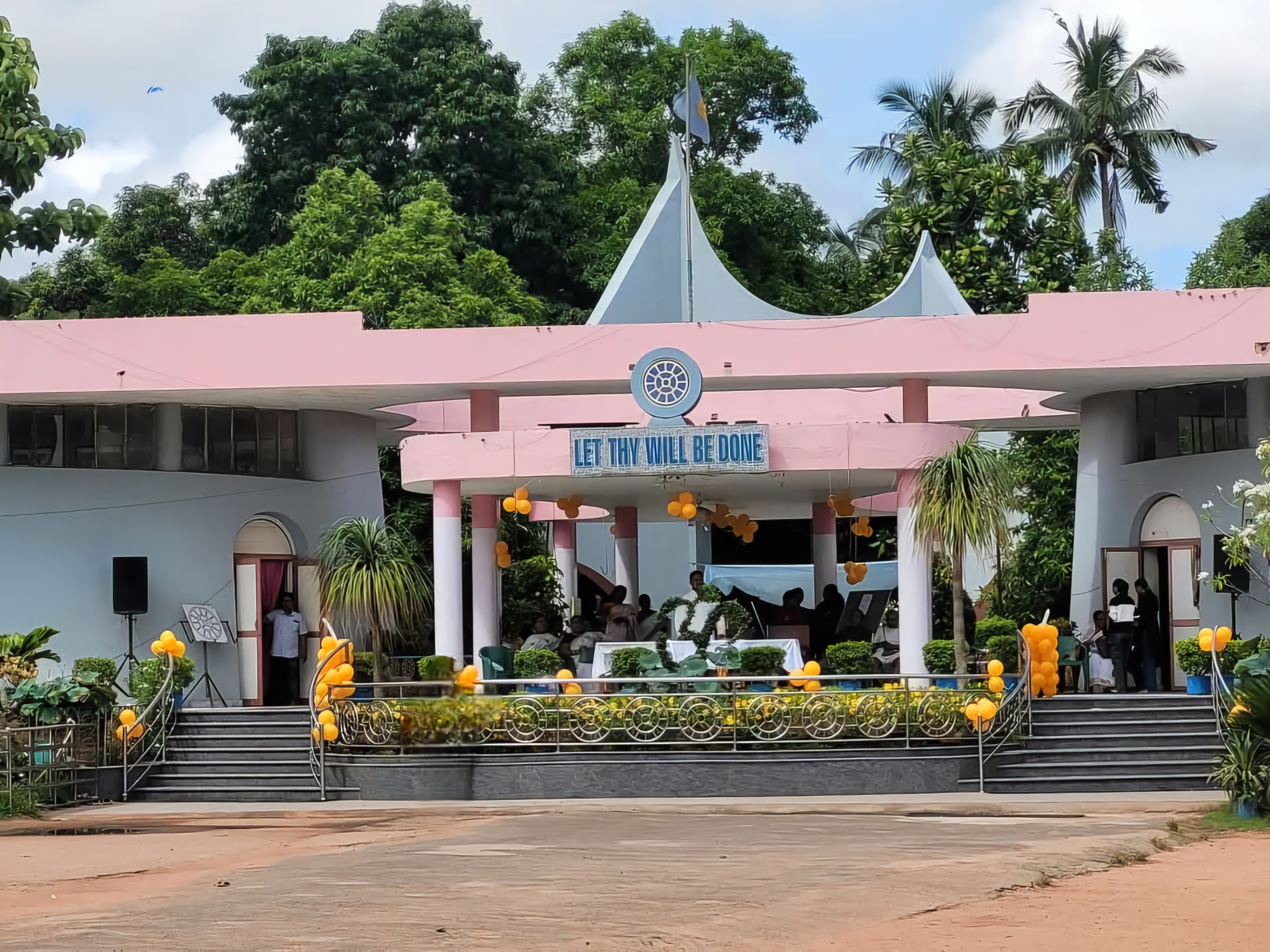
- Cuttack, Odisha, India

Information
- Type: private school
- Motto: "Integral Education"
- Established: 1971
- Founder: Trustees of New Life Education
- Principal: Neeta Sarkar
- Faculty: 120
- Grades: Lower Nursery to Class +2 examination
- Campus type: Urban
- Affiliation: BSE, CHSE(O)
- Website: www.mothersorissa.org

Sri Aurobindo Institute of Higher Studies and Research, (S.A.I.H.S.R) Matrubhaban, located at Cuttack, Odisha, The institute founded on 18 July 1971. It began in 1948 as the Sri Aurobindo Study Circle movement, it inspired by the principles of Sri Aurobindo. This is the one among two study circles of Odisha open at Rairangpur in 1949 and Cuttack in 1950. It is affiliated with the Board of Secondary Education, Odisha, and the Council of Higher Secondary Education, Odisha.

== History ==
The institute was founded in 1949 after two Sri Aurobindo Study Circles were set up in Odisha, one in Rairangpur and another in Cuttack. These began under the guidance of Sri Ramakrishna Das, a follower of Sri Aurobindo who went under the name Babaji Maharaj.

Babaji Maharaj pioneered the campaign to spread Sri Aurobindo's philosophy throughout the nation of Odisha. The institution's activities involved the founding of integral education centers, women's groups, study circles, and youth organizations.

Cuttack's Matrubhaban was the centerpiece for these endeavors, luring in participants from all over Odisha's branches and zones.

It dedicates itself to the teachings of Sri Aurobindo and The Mother, focusing on growing human awareness, spiritual growth, and integral education.

== Structure of organizations ==
In Odisha, the work is divided into nine zones, each heading up of a district. Each year, officials from every zone meet at Matrubhaban to plan future events along with assessing present endeavors.

== See also ==
- Education in Odisha
- List of schools in Odisha
- Auroville
- Sri Aurobindo
- Sri Aurobindo Ashram
- Mirra Alfassa
