= Choudwar-Cuttack Assembly constituency =

Constituency of the Odisha legislative assembly in India

Coordinates: 20.546°N 85.913°E

Choudwar-Cuttack
- Constituency No. 91 for the Odisha Legislative Assembly

Constituency details
- Country: India
- Region: East India
- State: Odisha
- Division: Central Division
- District: Cuttack
- Lok Sabha constituency: Cuttack
- Established: 1961
- Total electors: 2,33,928 (Note: as on 2024) (Note: as data published by election commission)
- Reservation: None

Member of Legislative Assembly
- 17th Odisha Legislative Assembly
- Incumbent Souvic Biswal
- Party: Biju Janata Dal
- Elected year: 2024

Choudwar-Cuttack is a Vidhan Sabha constituency of Cuttack district, Odisha, India.

This constituency includes Choudwar, 19 wards of Cuttack, Charibatia (C.T), Choudwar (O.G), and 6 Gram panchayats (Banipada, Nakhara, Kayalpada, Indranipatna, Kayalpada and Agrahat) Tangi-Choudwar block.

== Elected Members ==
Vote share of winning candidates
2024	51.71%
2019	48.41%
2014	54.45%
2009	56.53%
2004	57.39%
2000	36.54%
1995	43.13%
1990	75.59%
1985	51.16%
1980	52.66%
1977	64.39%

Since its formation in 1961, 15 elections were held till date.

List of members elected from Choudwar-Cuttack constituency are:

Year	Member	Party
2024	Souvic Biswal	Biju Janata Dal
2019	Souvic Biswal	Biju Janata Dal
2014	Pravat Ranjan Biswal	Biju Janata Dal
2009	Pravat Ranjan Biswal	Biju Janata Dal
2004	Dharmananda Behera	Biju Janata Dal
2000	Bidhubhusan Praharaj	Independent politician
1995	Kanhu Charan Lenka	Indian National Congress
1990	Raj Kishore Ram	Janata Dal
1985	Rasananda Sahoo	Indian National Congress
1980	Kanhu Charan Lenka	Indian National Congress (I)
1977	Raj Kishore Ram	Janata Party
1974	Kanhu Charan Lenka	Indian National Congress
1971	Kanhu Charan Lenka	Indian National Congress (R)
1967	Akulananda Behera	Praja Socialist Party
1961	Biju Patnaik	Indian National Congress

== Election results ==
=== 2024 ===
Voting were held on 25 May 2024 in 3rd phase of Odisha Assembly Election & 6th phase of Indian General Election. Counting of votes was on 4 June 2024. In 2024 election, Biju Janata Dal candidate Souvic Biswal defeated Bharatiya Janata Party candidate Nayan Kishore Mohanty by a margin of 17,816 votes.

2024 Odisha Vidhan Sabha Election, Choudwar-Cuttack
Party	Candidate	Votes	%	±%
BJD	Souvic Biswal	72,325	51.71	
BJP	Nayan Kishore Mohanty	54,509	38.97	
INC	Meera Mallick	5,118	3.66	
NOTA	None of the above	1,040	0.74	
Majority		17,816	12.74	
Turnout		1,39,878	59.8	
BJD hold				

=== 2019 ===
In 2019 election, Biju Janata Dal candidate Souvic Biswal defeated Bharatiya Janata Party candidate Nayan Kishore Mohanty by a margin of 21,584 votes.

2019 Vidhan Sabha Election, Choudwar-Cuttack
Party	Candidate	Votes	%	±%
BJD	Souvic Biswal	64,686	48.41	
BJP	Nayan Kishore Mohanty	43,102	32.29	
Independent	Deepak Kumar Barik	14,652	10.99	
INC	Jagdish Chandra Mohanty	6,761	5.07	
NOTA	None of the above	1,190	0.89	
Majority		21,584	16.12	
Turnout		1,37,121	59.54	
BJD hold				

=== 2014 ===
In 2014 election, Biju Janata Dal candidate Pravat Ranjan Biswal defeated Indian National Congress candidate Suresh Mohapatra by a margin of 41,385 votes.

2014 Vidhan Sabha Election, Choudwar-Cuttack
Party	Candidate	Votes	%	±%
BJD	Pravat Ranjan Biswal	70,880	54.45	−
INC	Suresh Mohapatra	29,495	22.66	−
BJP	Nayan Kishore Mohanty	24,651	18.94	−
None of the above	None of the above	1,365		−
Majority		41,385	31.89	
Turnout		1,30,176	61.96	
Registered electors		2,05,767		
BJD hold				

=== 2009 ===
In 2009 election, Biju Janata Dal candidate Pravat Ranjan Biswal defeated Independent candidate Deepak Kumar Barik by a margin of 32,777 votes.

2009 Vidhan Sabha Election, Choudwar-Cuttack
Party	Candidate	Votes	%	±%
BJD	Pravat Ranjan Biswal	58,495	56.53	−
Independent	Deepak Kumar Barik	25,718	24.85	−
BJP	Nayan Kishore Mohanty	8,988	8.69	−
INC	Sabitri Chowdhury	8,498	8.21	−
Majority		32,777	31.68 (Note: %of total valid votes)	−
Turnout		1,03,479	53.15	−
Registered electors		1,94,678		
BJD hold				
