= Mahanga =

Coordinates: 20°33′N 86°12′E

- Village and Block
- Interactive map of Mahanga
- Country: India
- State: Odisha
- District: Cuttack

Languages
  - Official: Odia
- Time zone: UTC+5:30 (IST)
- Vehicle registration: OD
- Website: odisha.gov.in

Mahanga is a village and Community Development Block located in the Cuttack district of Odisha, India. Mahanga police station serves the village.

It is part of the Cuttack Zila Parishad and includes several Gram Panchayats. It is situated approximately 39 kilometers east of Cuttack city and serves as a key administrative unit in the region.

Mahanga is a part of the Mahanga (Vidhan Sabha constituency) of the Odisha Legislative Assembly, which is part of the Kendrapara Lok Sabha constituency.

== Villages ==
The following is the list of villages in the Mahanga block.

- Anandapur
- Bajapura
- Barahipur
- Basudevpur
- Bhadraswar
- Bhaunria
- Bheda
- Chahapada
- Chahapada
- Gokan
- Gopalpur
- Gotara
- Haladia
- Jaleswarpur
- Kaitha
- Koliatha
- Kuhunda
- Kundi
- Kurujanga
- Kusupur
- Lalitagiri
- Madhupur
- Mahanga
- Mouda
- Mulabasanta
- Nahanga
- Nrutanga
- Oshanga
- Paikarapur
- Pallisahi
- Panaspur
- Podamarai
- Rahania
- Sahapur
- Samsarpur
- Srikrushnapur
- Umar
- Usuma
