= Cuttack district =

Cuttack district Kataka district
- District
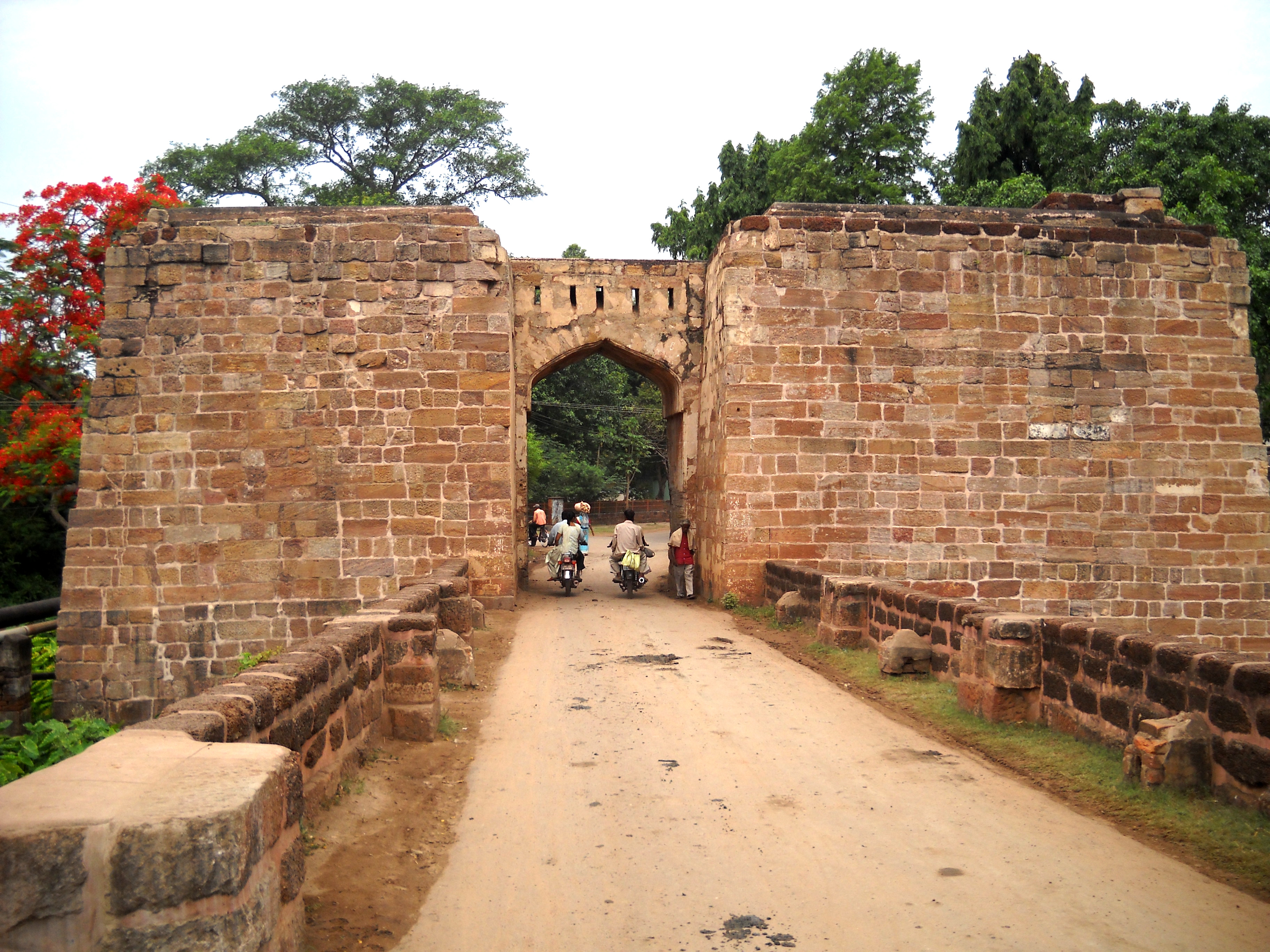
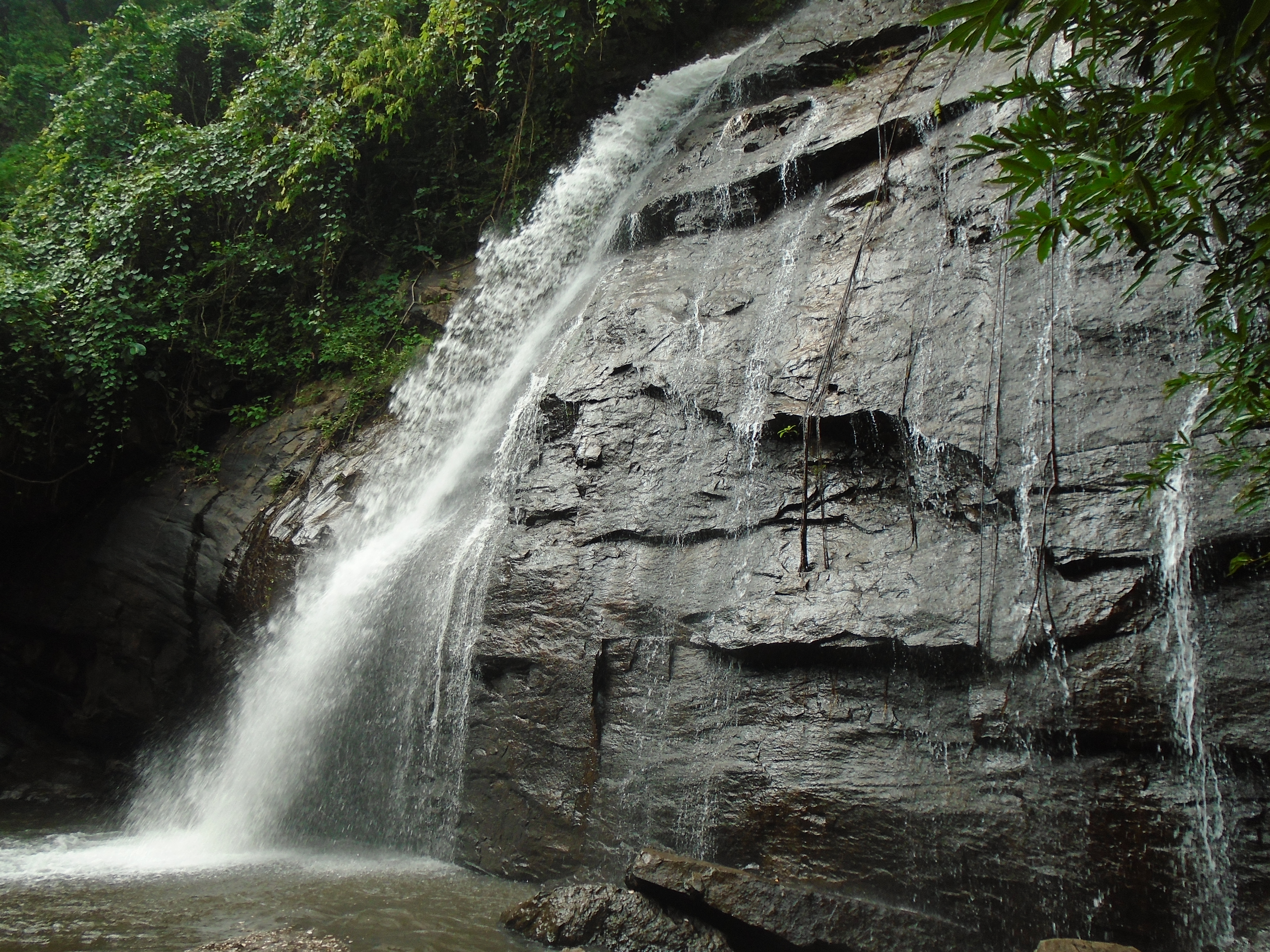
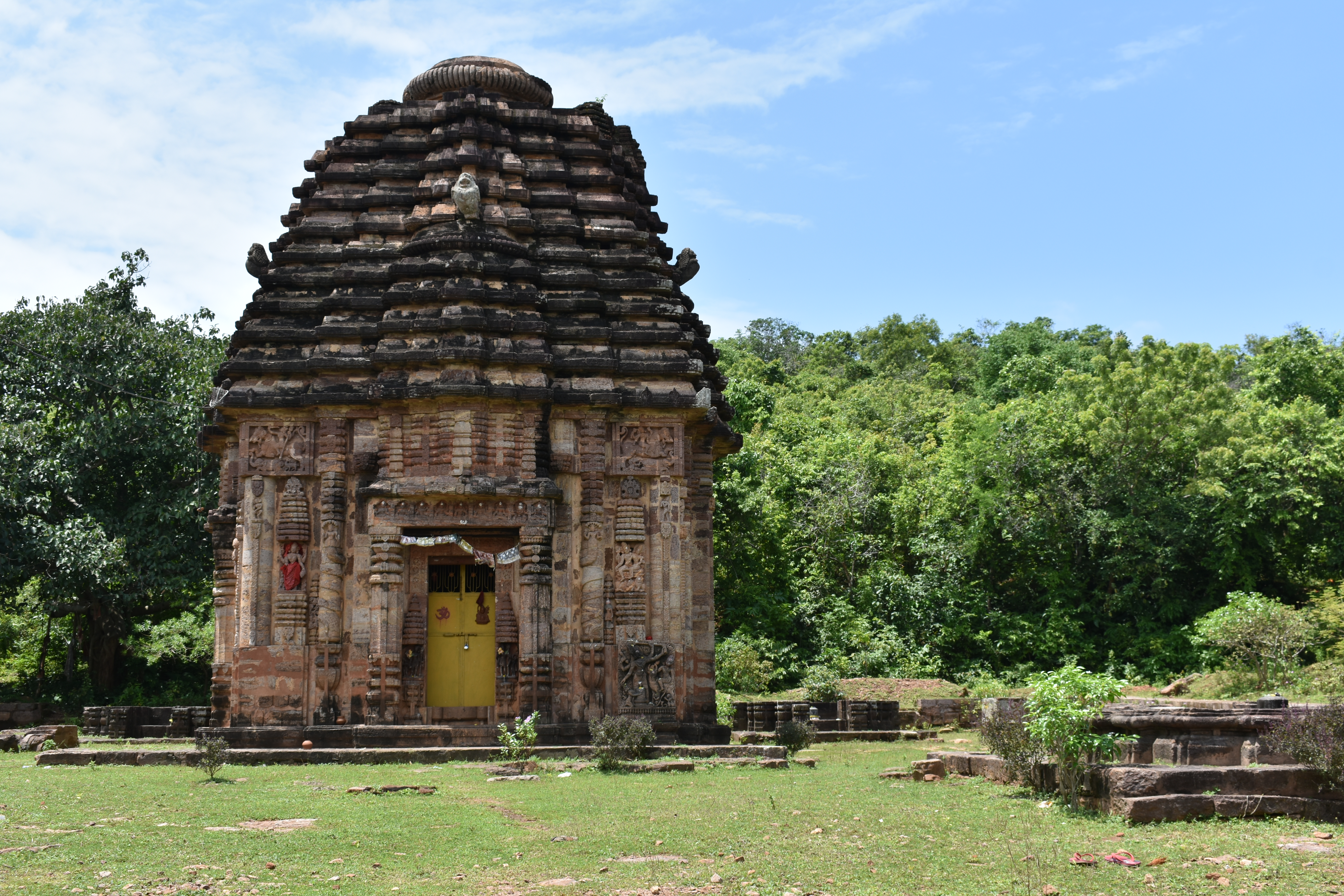
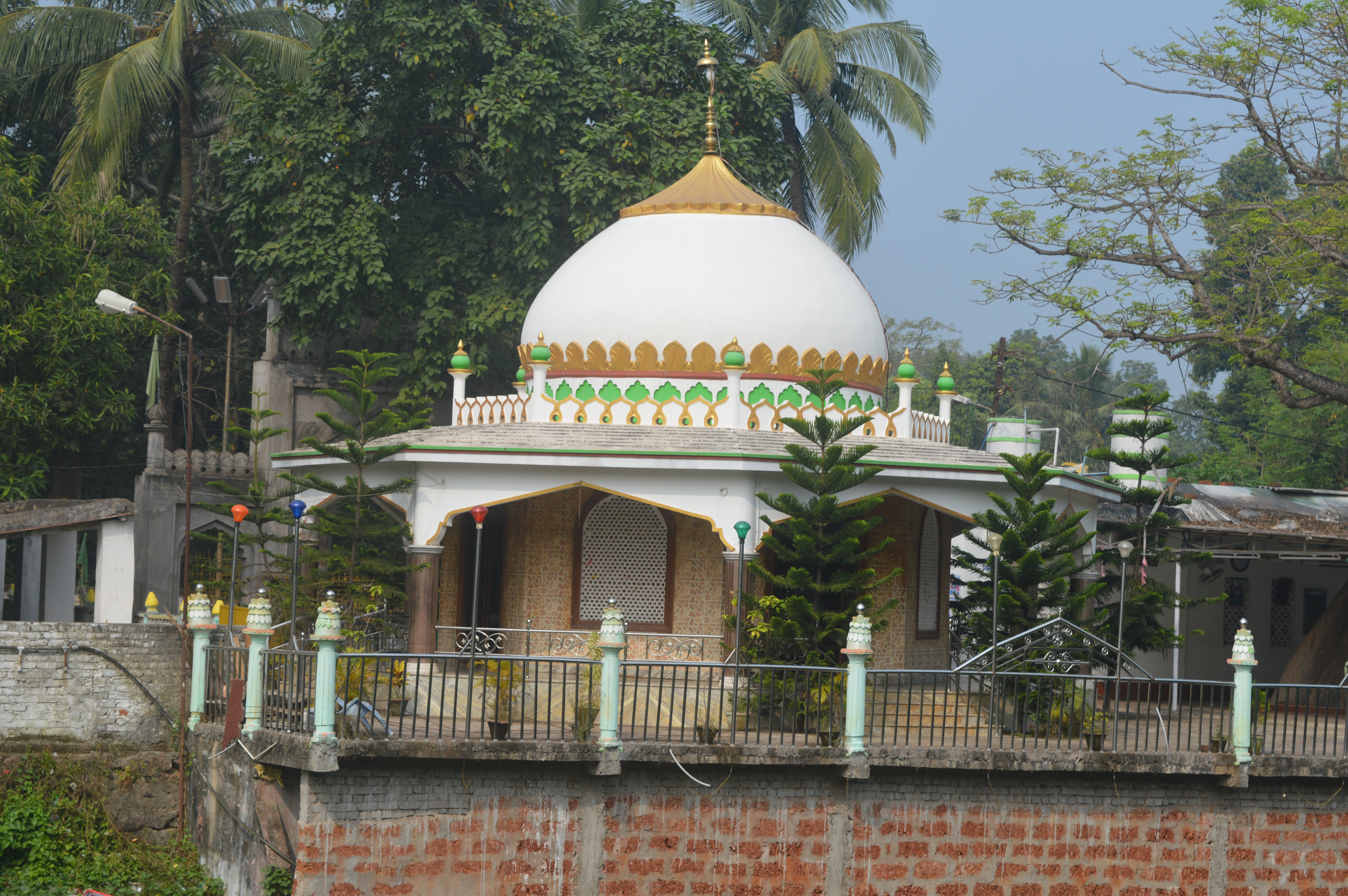
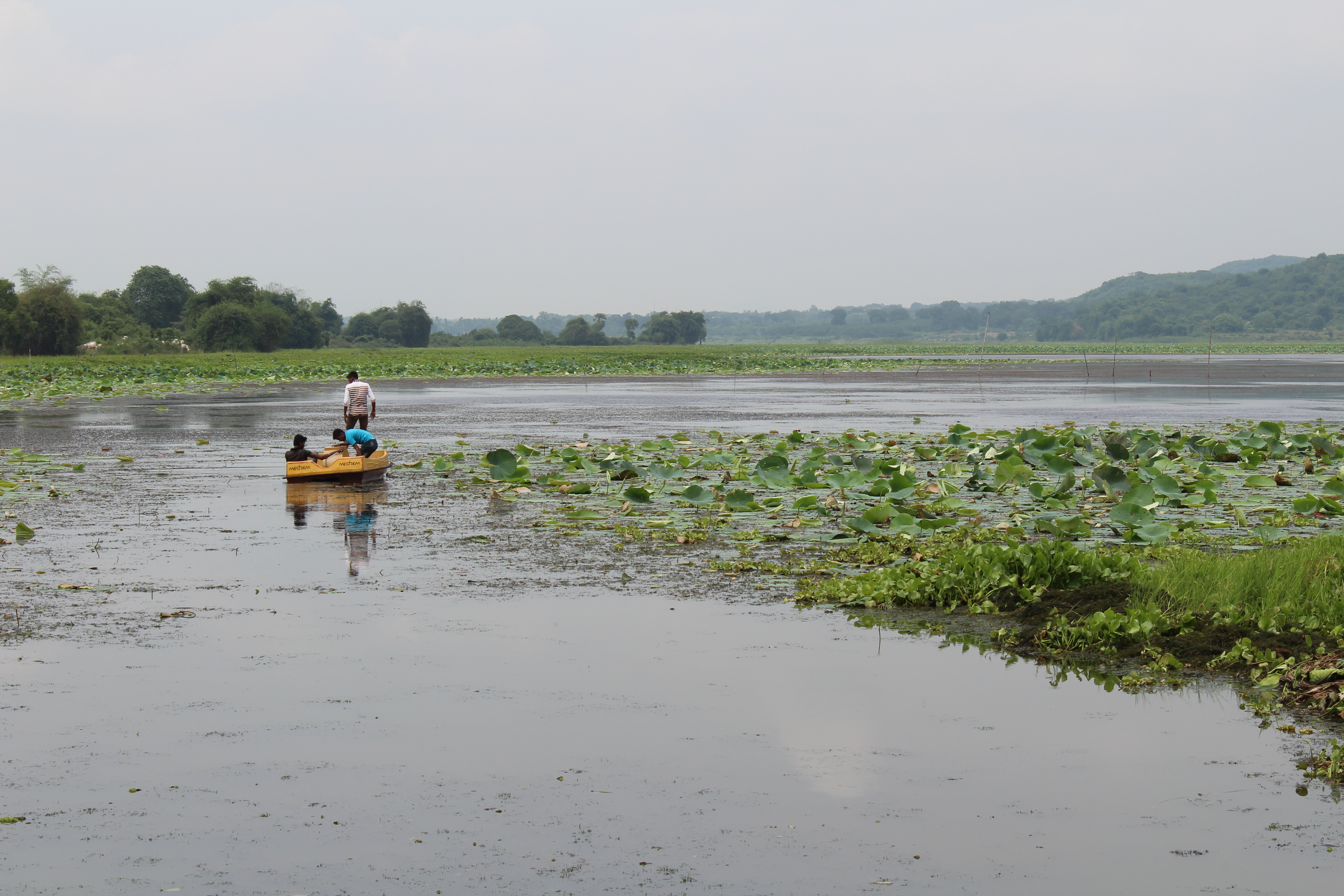
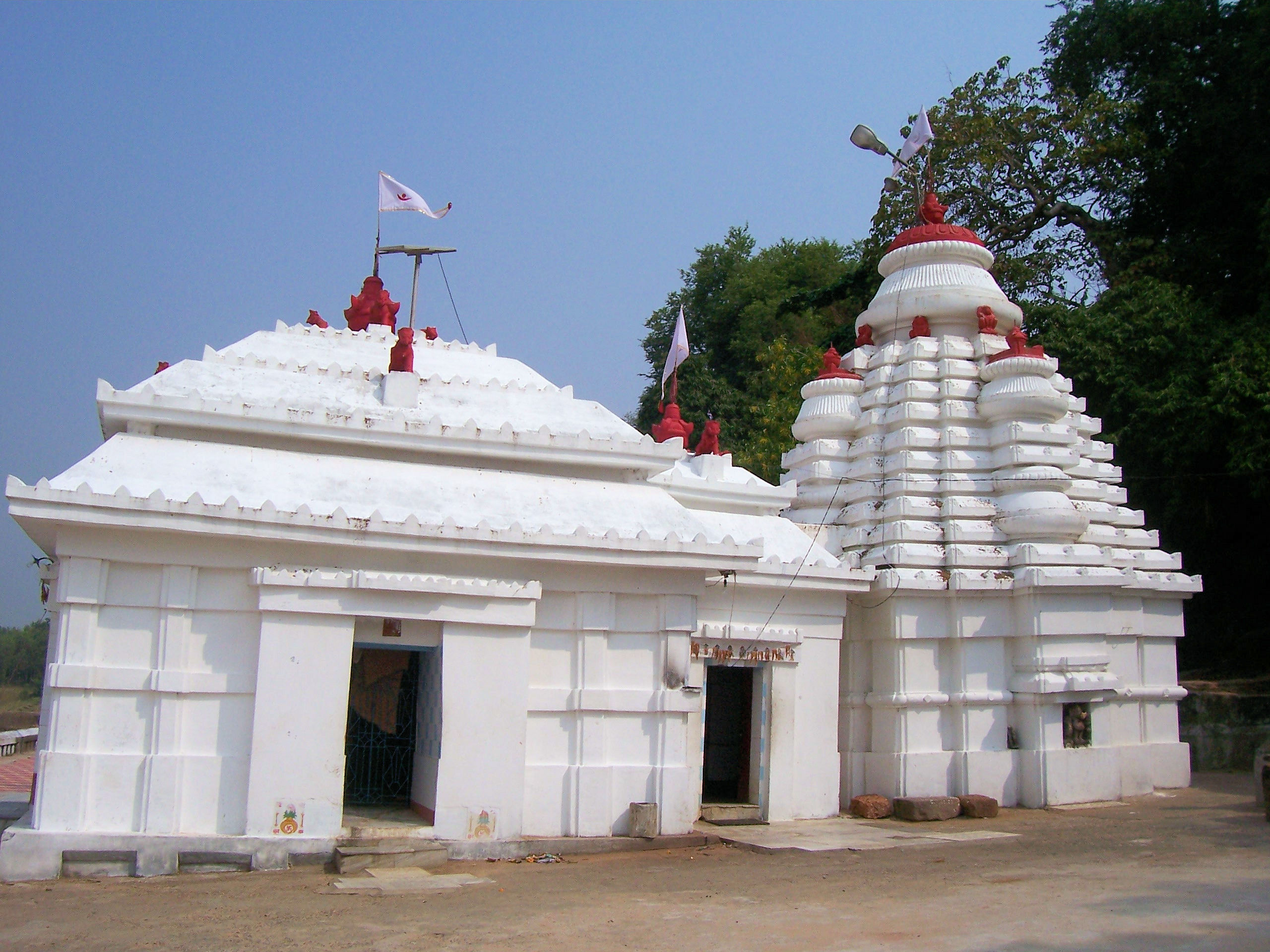
- Top: Barabati fort, Deojhar Waterfall, Baba Bukhari Dargah in Cuttack, Anshupa Lake, Banasur Temple in Barapurikia, Bhattarika Temple
- Interactive map of Cuttack district
- Coordinates: 20.466°N 85.833°E
- Country: India
- State: Odisha
- Headquarters: Cuttack

Government
  - Collector & District Magistrate: Sri Dattatraya Bhausaheb Shinde, IAS
  - Superintendent of Police: Jugal Kishore Banoth, IPS

Area
  - Total: 3,932 km^{2} (1,518 sq mi)
- Elevation: 25 m (82 ft)

Population (2011)
  - Total: 2,624,470
  - Rank: 2nd
  - Density: 666/km^{2} (1,720/sq mi)

Languages
  - Official: Odia
- Time zone: UTC+5:30 (IST)
- PIN: 753 xxx
- Telephone code: 0671
- Vehicle registration: OD-05
- Sex ratio: 940 ♀/1000 ♂
- Literacy: 85.05%
- Lok Sabha constituency: Cuttack
- Vidhan Sabha constituency: 09
- Climate: Aw (Köppen)
- Precipitation: 1,501.3 millimetres (59.11 in)
- Avg. summer temperature: 40 °C (104 °F)
- Avg. winter temperature: 10 °C (50 °F)
- Website: cuttack.nic.in

Cuttack district (officially Kataka district) is one of the 30 districts of Odisha state in India. It is located in the coastal part of the state and its administrative headquarters are located in the city of Cuttack. As of 2011 Census, after Ganjam, it is the second most populous district of Odisha, with a population of 2,624,470. The name is an anglicized form of Kataka or Katak meaning Fort – referring to the Barabati Fort. The district is bisected by the river Mahanadi and its numerous distributaries and occupies a large portion of the river's delta. It is bounded by the Angul, Dhenkanal, Nayagarh and Khurda districts to the west while its southern and eastern boundaries touch Puri, Jagatsinghpur, Kendrapara and Jajpur districts.

== History ==
The history of the district is the same as that of Odisha owing to the strategic location of Cuttack city. The city in some form or the other has been an administrative centre since the Kesari kings of the 10th century. The fort at Barabati continued to be the capital of the Mughals who started revenue settlement of Coastal Odisha – thus giving it the vernacular name of Mughalbandi. Occupied successively by the Nawab of Bengal and the Maratha Empire, it finally fell to the British. Simultaneously, a number of petty princely states existed along the north and south bank of the Mahanadi upstream from Cuttack. After the present Sadar subdivision of the district was conquered along with the rest of Coastal Odisha by the East India Company in 1803, a magistrate and judge were appointed for the newly conquered areas with headquarters at Puri which was later shifted to Cuttack city. Further reorganisation took place in 1828 and three districts of Balasore, Puri and Cuttack with headquarters at towns of the same name were constituted. Each district was headed by an officer known as the Collector and District Magistrate who was a member of the Indian Civil Service. The Commissioner of Orissa division with superintendence powers over these three districts as well as the associated princely states also had his headquarters at Cuttack.

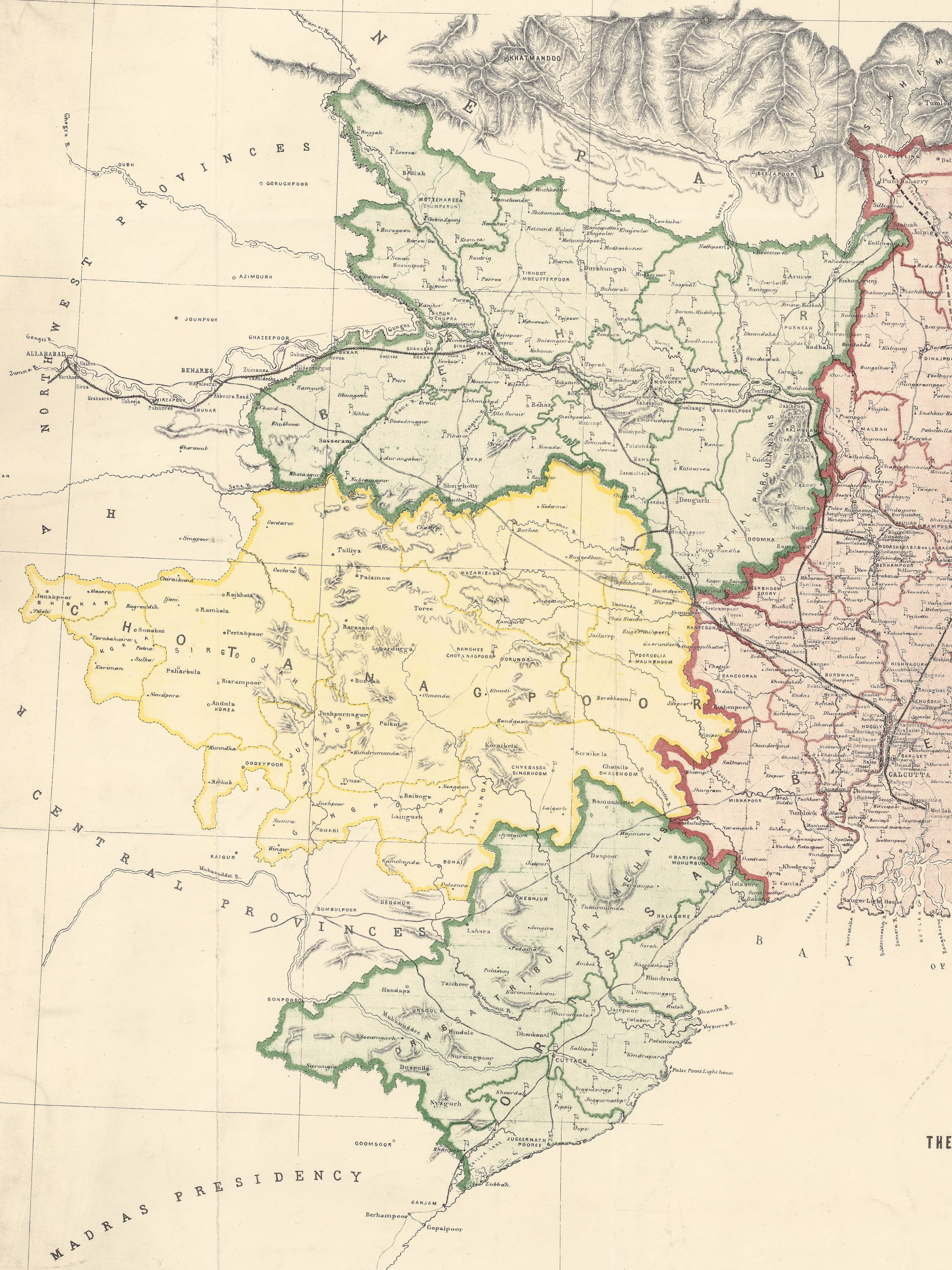
Cuttack District as part of the Orissa Division, Bengal Presidency, 1872

The subdivision of Banki comprising the feudatory state of Banki and zamindari of Dampada was added to the district in 1840 after the Raja was deposed for murder. As of 1872, the district comprised around 3,178 square miles (8,230 km^{2}) area with 1,494,784 inhabitants. The district reached its greatest extent after 1948 when the princely states of Narasinghpur, Baramba, Athagad and Tigiria were added to the district after their accession to India. Subdivisions like Gram Panchayats and Community Developments blocks were introduced in 1962. A small portion of the district adjoining Bhubaneswar was transferred to Puri district that year.

Before the division of the district in 1992, it was the largest in Odisha by population. It had no less than 42 blocks and six subdivisions with headquarters at Banki, Athagad, Cuttack, Jajpur, Jagatsinghpur and Kendrapada. The last three were split off to form separate districts that year.

== Renaming to Kataka ==
On 12 June 2026, the Odisha state Cabinet approved the correction of colonial-era distorted English spellings for 64 locations across 26 districts, officially restoring Cuttack to its original Odia phonetic form Kataka. The announcement was made by Odisha Chief Secretary Anu Garg, who stated that the colonial-era distortions had diluted the state's linguistic heritage and cultural identity.

On 22 June 2026, the Revenue and Disaster Management Department, issued the Corrected English spelling of the names of Administrative unit Notification, formally implementing corrected English spellings of various administrative place names across the state. The changes were also published in the Odisha Gazette on the same day. The notification followed approval by the Odisha State Cabinet to revise anglicised or historically distorted spellings in order to align them with original Odia phonetic forms.

The name Kataka is the original Odia/Sanskrit form meaning "The Fort," referring to the ancient Barabati Fort around which the city initially developed. Cuttack was an anglicised transliteration that emerged during British colonial rule. The initiative follows recommendations by a high-level committee chaired by Pratibha Ray, which reviewed thousands of public suggestions and identified "Apabhransa" (distorted) names to restore.

This update follows earlier proposals and public discussions. In 2024, Cuttack Municipal Corporation Mayor Subhash Chandra Singh had formally proposed restoring the historic name "Katak" (citing archival records from Ravenshaw College) to the Chief Minister. The 2026 Cabinet decision effectively implemented a standardized spelling correction along these lines for official English usage. The city continues to be known locally in Odia as କଟକ (Kataka), and the change primarily affects English-language official documentation, signage, and references.

== Geography and climate ==
The district covers an area of 3,932 km^{2}. The geographical location of the district is 20,4625° N latitude and 85.8830° E longitude. The average annual precipitation over the district is about 1,440 mm, most of which occurs during south-west monsoon period (June to September). The temperature seems moderate for the area throughout the year except for the summer season (March to mid-June), where the average maximum temperature is 41 °C. The average minimum temperature over the district is 10 °C.

The district is divided into two distinct geographic regions. The Sadar subdivision mostly consists of the alluvial delta formed by the River Mahanadi and its distributaries. The width of the delta stretches to about 60–75 kilometres from the coast. The land is mostly flat and is intersected by numerous channels, active and abandoned, of the Mahanadi system. Few isolated hillocks near Cuttack form the only break in the plain. The land is often waterlogged during the Monsoon and an elaborate system of canals, embankments and weirs is used for both flood control and irrigation. Paddy is the primary crop and is grown throughout the year. The villages are located on an artificial high ground and are usually surrounded by copses of banyan, mango and other large trees. Most villages have one or more tanks called pokharis that supply their fresh water needs.

The Athagad and Banki subdivisions consist of broken hill country on either side of the Mahanadi river. Most of the hills are of low height and present a rounded appearance reaching a maximum of around 2500 feet along the border with Hindol. Occasional fertile, narrow valleys formed by riverine action are also found – especially near Khurda district. Numerous small streams run down these hills to join the Mahanadi. Substantial forested tracts are still to be found in the Dampada block and Narasinghpur blocks while Athagad, Tigiria and Badamba blocks are largely agricultural. A thick layer of sandstone underlies these subdivisions while occasional laterite stone outcrops can be seen at many places.

== Administration ==
The district is headed by a collector and district magistrate, usually from the Indian Administrative Service. The collector combines revenue collection functions with law and order responsibilities under the Code of Criminal Procedure, 1973. He is also the lynchpin of development activities in the district and chairs numerous committees to oversee the same. In his day-to-day functions, he is assisted by two additional district magistrates who look after Revenue and General Administration. The district is divided into a total of 15 Tahsils each headed by a Tahsildar for land revenue purposes.

Development activities in the district under the Panchayati Raj Department are overseen by the Chief Development Officer. The Collector is the ex-officio CEO of this office. A total of 14 blocks under the Orissa Panchayat Samiti Act are operational in the district each headed by a Block Development Officer who reports directly to the CDO and the collector.

Policing is the responsibility of the Superintendent of Police or SP who is nominally under the District Magistrate but is independent in practice. Each block has one or more police stations headed by an Inspector or Sub Inspector in-charge. After the introduction of the Bhubaneswar–Cuttack Police Commissionerate, Magisterial powers in the urban area covered under it have been vested in the Commissioner of Police who exercises them through deputy and Assistant Commissioners of Police. The SP and senior officers of the Commissionerate are usually from the Indian Police Service.

The three subdivisions of Banki, Athagad and Sadar are each headed by a Sub Collector cum Sub Divisional Magistrate who exercises most of the powers of the Collector in his jurisdiction. His police counterpart is the Subdivisional Police Officer. The Sub Collector exercises both direct and indirect control over the Tahsils, Blocks and Police Stations in his jurisdiction.

The urban areas of Cuttack, Banki, Athagad and Choudwar are constituted as municipal bodies. Cuttack Municipal Corporation is usually headed by a senior Indian Administrative Service officer called the municipal commissioner who is independent from the collector in his day-to-day functioning. The other three urban bodies have executive officers who report to the project director, District Urban Development Authority and the Collector.

The district and Sessions Judge of Cuttack handles both civil and criminal cases. He is assisted by a number of additional district judges, civil judges and magistrates at the headquarters. At the subdivision level, the Sub Divisional Judicial Magistrate heads the criminal justice system.

== Education ==
Cuttack has a rich educational landscape featuring schools run by the Cuttack Municipal Corporation as well as private entities. The city's schools provide courses in Bengali, Telugu, Hindi, Urdu, Gujarati, English, and Odia. While English-medium schools follow CBSE or ICSE curricula, Odia-medium schools have a connection with the Board of Secondary Education, Odisha.

The oldest school near Odisha, Ravenshaw Collegiate School, is situated in the city and boasts renowned alumni including Harekrushna Mahatab, Biju Patnaik, and Netaji Subhas Chandra Bose. Secondary Board High School, Ravenshaw Girls' High School, Stewart School, and Delhi Public School Kalinga were a few other renowned schools. Ranihat High School, Nua Bazar High School, Odisha Police High School, Sri Aurobindo Institute of Higher Studies and Research Matrubhaban, Christ Collegiate School, Kamalakanta Vidayapitha, Peary Mohan Academy, Badambadi New Colony High School, Buckley Girls School, Sri Aurobindo School Of New Thought, CRRI High School.

Cuttack's higher learning system, known as the 10+2+3/4 plan, provides for students to complete 10 years of formal schooling, two years of junior college, and possibly general or professional degree courses following that. Amongst the top colleges are Sailabala Women's College, the oldest in Odisha, Stewart Science College, and Ravenshaw College.

Additionally, Cuttack is linked to professional and technical schools such as Madhusudan Law College, which will soon be a university, Bhubananda Odisha School of Engineering (BOSE), and the Institute of Management and Information Technology (IMIT).

One of the first teacher training institutions in Odisha is the Radhanath Institute of Advanced Studies in Education (RNIASE), which was established in 1869. Urdu teacher training is offered by the Muslim Minority Govt Elementary Teacher Education Institution in Sheikh Bazar.

== Transport ==
Cuttack's location places it at the centre of the road and railway network in Odisha. National Highway 16 connecting Kolkata and Chennai passes through the district. Major State Highways to Dhenkanal, Banki, Sambalpur and Puri take off from this road. Other important roads connect to Bhubaneswar, Khurda, Jagatsinghpur and Kendrapara.

The main-line of the East Coast Railway connecting Howrah to Chennai Central has a station at Cuttack. Lines to Paradip and Sambalpur via Talcher take off from the district. Almost all trains passing through have a stop at Cuttack.

Waterways were formerly extremely important but are almost extinct now. Limited boating takes place for pleasure or fishing on the Mahanadi. The nearest airport, Biju Patnaik International Airport is about 30 km away from Cuttack city.

== Economy ==
Cuttack is widely known as the commercial capital of Odisha. It is believed to have the largest GDP among all cities in Odisha due to its large business houses and wide range of industries ranging from ferrous alloys, steel and logistics to agriculture and traditional industries like textiles and handicrafts. There are many trading houses in the city renowned nationally and internationally. The Port of Paradip around 85 km from the city facilitates the process.

=== Large-scale industries ===
There are 11 large-scale industries in and around Cuttack mostly in Choudwar and Athagarh and many more in the pipeline. These industries include steel, power, automobile, alloys, fireclay, etc. Indian Metals & Ferro Alloys, the country's largest producer of ferrous alloys is in Choudwar, Cuttack. A mega-auto complex is in implementation stages on the city's outskirts.

=== Traditional industries ===
The legacy of Cuttack in traditional industries is enviable. The city is second-largest hub for textiles in eastern India after Raipur. The city's annual textile trade generates over a billion dollars. A large textile park is planned by giving a facelift to the erstwhile Orissa Textile Mills on city outskirts. Cuttack is famous for its glory of craftsmanship of handicraft work in silver filigree. These fine and unique handicraft works add significantly to the local economy.

=== Logistics and other industries ===
The number of medium- and small-scale industries concentrated around Cuttack is by far the largest among the cities in the state. The industrial estates in and around Cuttack numbers around eight. Jagatpur and Khapuria are industrial estates inside the city. A large chunk of these serve as ancillary industries for the big industrial houses in Odisha and other states.

Cuttack occupies a very significant place in the logistics map of the country. It connects the upper mineral-advanced districts and states to the Kolkata-Chennai corridor at the meeting point of NH-42 and NH-5 at Manguli Square.

The proximity to Paradip Port comes as an added advantage. OSL Group, one of the leading stevedore firms of the country is headquartered in Cuttack. Cuttack, being the largest business hub of the state is the nodal point of trade and transport. It also has the largest wholesale commodities market of the state at Malgodown and Chatrabazar catering to the whole state.

=== Primary and service sector ===
Agriculture is a mainstay of Cuttack's economy. The nearby villages are known for their high-quality and surplus production of crops, vegetables and fruits. These are usually sold at the largest mandi of the state at Chatrabazar inside the city. The presence of Central Rice Research Institute (CRRI), the largest rice research institute in Asia, adds to the importance of Cuttack in the agricultural map of the country.

Being the former capital of the state and a big business hub, many central and state government and corporate offices are in Cuttack. The service sector is quite large. The people of nearby districts are heavily depended on the city for their livelihood, contributing to the service sector and, thus, the floating population. The presence of Odisha High Court and the SCB Medical & College, the largest medical institution in the state, further nourishes the service sector. The Oriya film industry, Ollywood, is based in Cuttack and adds to its economy. Education is a major industry due to large number of universities, colleges, schools and coaching centres and caters to the neighboring districts.

== Demographics ==
Historical population
| Year | Pop. | ±% |
|---|---|---|
| 1901 | 816,086 | — |
| 1911 | 835,867 | +2.4% |
| 1921 | 812,372 | −2.8% |
| 1931 | 864,780 | +6.5% |
| 1941 | 905,515 | +4.7% |
| 1951 | 935,593 | +3.3% |
| 1961 | 1,131,236 | +20.9% |
| 1971 | 1,414,425 | +25.0% |
| 1981 | 1,719,771 | +21.6% |
| 1991 | 2,052,936 | +19.4% |
| 2001 | 2,340,832 | +14.0% |
| 2011 | 2,624,470 | +12.1% |
Source: Census of India

According to the 2011 census Cuttack district has a population of 2,624,470, roughly equal to the nation of Kuwait or the US state of Nevada. This gives it a ranking of 156th in India (out of a total of 640). The population is divided among 579,170 families. About 10% of the total population is of children below the age of 10 years. The district has a population density of 667 inhabitants per square kilometre (1,730/sq mi). Its population growth rate over the decade 2001–2011 was 11.86%. Cuttack has a sex ratio of 940 females for every 1000 males, and a literacy rate of 84.2%, both higher than the all India average. 28.05% of the population lives in urban areas. Scheduled Castes and Scheduled Tribes make up 19.00% and 3.57% of the population respectively. The child sex ratio of 914 is lower than the overall district average.

=== Religion ===
Religions in Cuttack district (2011)
| Religion | Percent |
| Hinduism | 93.65% |
| Islam | 5.38% |
| Christianity | 0.46% |
| Other or not stated | 0.51% |

Hindus are the overwhelming majority of the district's population with more than 93.65% of the population practising Hinduism. Scheduled Castes constitute 19% of the overall population while Scheduled Tribes are about 3%. Religion plays an important role in the lives of people and temples are present in every habitation. Like much of Odisha, Jagannath is the preferred deity of worship while other gods and goddesses like Durga, Ganesha and Shiva also have large shrines dedicated to them. Almost every village has a local shrine where the presiding female deity or Gram Thakurani is worshipped.

Odia Muslims are about 5.38% of the population and are primarily concentrated in Cuttack city as well as the blocks of Mahanga, Salepur, Niali and Nischintakoili. As noted above, they are distinguished by the use of Odia Hindustani as their mother tongue. Almost all are Sunnis of the Hanafi school. Small communities of Shia – mainly Bohra and Ismaili from Gujarat are found in Cuttack city while Ahmadiyya are found in Tigiria block. Large mosques are to be found in Cuttack, Raisunguda and Mahanga areas.

Christians number about 0.46% of the population and are almost all descendants of converts from Hinduism. They are concentrated in Cuttack city and a couple of nearby villages in Athagad block. The population is mostly Roman Catholic with a large number of Church of North India adherents as well. The community also runs a number of well regarded educational institutions throughout the district.

A small community of Mahayana Buddhists numbering around 6,000 are found in the villages of Maniabandh and Nuapatna in Baramba and Tigiria blocks. This is the last remnant of a much larger Buddhist community that dominated Odisha for close to a thousand years till the 14th century. Almost all of them are weavers and produce the well regarded Maniabandh sarees. Apart from the usual Buddhist deities, a large number of Hindu deities are also a part of their pantheon. They are unique in being the only indigenous Buddhists to have survived outside the Himalayas in mainland India.

Small communities of Sikhs and Jains are also found in Cuttack city. They are mostly traders and maintain strong links with their brethren in other parts of India.

=== Languages ===
Languages of Cuttack district (2011)
1. Odia (91.4%)
2. Urdu (4.66%)
3. Hindi (1.24%)
4. Others (2.74%)

At the time of the 2011 Census of India, 91.36% of the population in the district spoke Odia, 4.66% Urdu, 1.24% Hindi, 0.86% Bengali and 0.78% Telugu as their first language.

Odia is the language of the Odia people and is spoken throughout the district. It is often the only language spoken outside the urban areas. Cuttack dialect of Odia language is widely considered to be the standard form of the Odia language and is frequently used in Odia newspapers, medium of the instruction in schools and colleges, cinemas and literary works.

Urdu, or more properly Odia Hindustani, is the language of the Odia Muslims who speak it as their mother tongue. In its general construction, the dialect is almost indistinguishable from the standard Hindi/Urdu of cities in Eastern India like Kolkata and Patna. However, the spoken dialect has a number of peculiar features due to the influence of Odia. The grammar is somewhat simplified and significant features of a patois are seen. Code switching is common and standard Urdu is always used for writing and formal communication. Most Muslims also speak Odia as a second language. Standard Hindi is the language of recent migrants from North India to Cuttack city.

Cuttack city also has small Bengali and Telegu communities who migrated during the late 19th century. The former were government officials or employed in the courts and offices while the latter were mostly labourers and menial workers. They speak their respective languages with significant Odia admixture.

== Politics ==
Under the three-tier system of Panchayati Raj, the district is divided into three Lok Sabha constituencies, 9 Vidhan Sabha constituencies, 1 Zila Parishad, 14 Panchayat Samitis and 373 Gram Panchayats.

The Zila Parishad is an elected body entrusted with the responsibility to oversee development activities in the district. It has 46 members including a president and a vice president. The collector is the ex-officio CEO of the Zila Parishad with the project director as the executive officer. The Panchayat Samitis are similar bodies at the block level with the block development officer as CEO. Gram Panchayats occupy the lowest rung and are headed by a Sarpanch assisted by an executive officer. Other Panchayat level officials include the Junior Engineer and the Gram Rozgar Sewak.

Most of Cuttack district is a part of the Cuttack (Lok Sabha constituency) with the exception of Niali which is a part of Jagatsinghpur (Lok Sabha constituency) along with Salepur and Mahanga which form a part of Kendrapara Lok Sabha constituency.

The following are the 9 Vidhan sabha constituencies of Cuttack district and their elected members of that area

| No. | Constituency | Reservation | Extent of the Assembly Constituency (Blocks) | Member of 16th Assembly | Party |
|---|---|---|---|---|---|
| 87 | Baramba | None | Baramba, Narasinghapur | Bijay Dalabehera | BJD |
| 88 | Banki | None | Banki (NAC), Banki, Banki-Damapara, Baranga (part) | Debi Ranjan Tripathy | BJD |
| 89 | Athgarh | None | Athgarh (NAC), Athgarh, Tigiria, Tangi-Chowdwar (part) | Ranendra Pratap Swain | BJD |
| 90 | Barabati-Cuttack | None | Cuttack (MC) (part) | Sofia Firdous | Congress |
| 91 | Choudwar-Cuttack | None | Chowdwar (M), Chowdwar (O. G), Charbatia (C. T), Cuttack (MC) (part), Tangi-Chowdwar (part) | Souvic Biswal | BJD |
| 92 | Niali | SC | Niali, Kantapada, Baranga (part) | Chhabi Mallik | BJP |
| 93 | Cuttack Sadar | SC | Cuttack Sadar, | Prakash Sethi | BJP |
| 87 | Salipur | None | Salipur, Tangi-Chowdwar (part) | Prasanta Behera | BJD |
| 95 | Mahanga | None | Mahanga, Nischintakoili (part) | Sarada Prasad Pradhan | Independent |

== See also ==
- Salepur
- Sisua village
- Oriya Literature
- Oriya language
- Odisha
- Jagannath
