= Odia Muslims =

Indian community

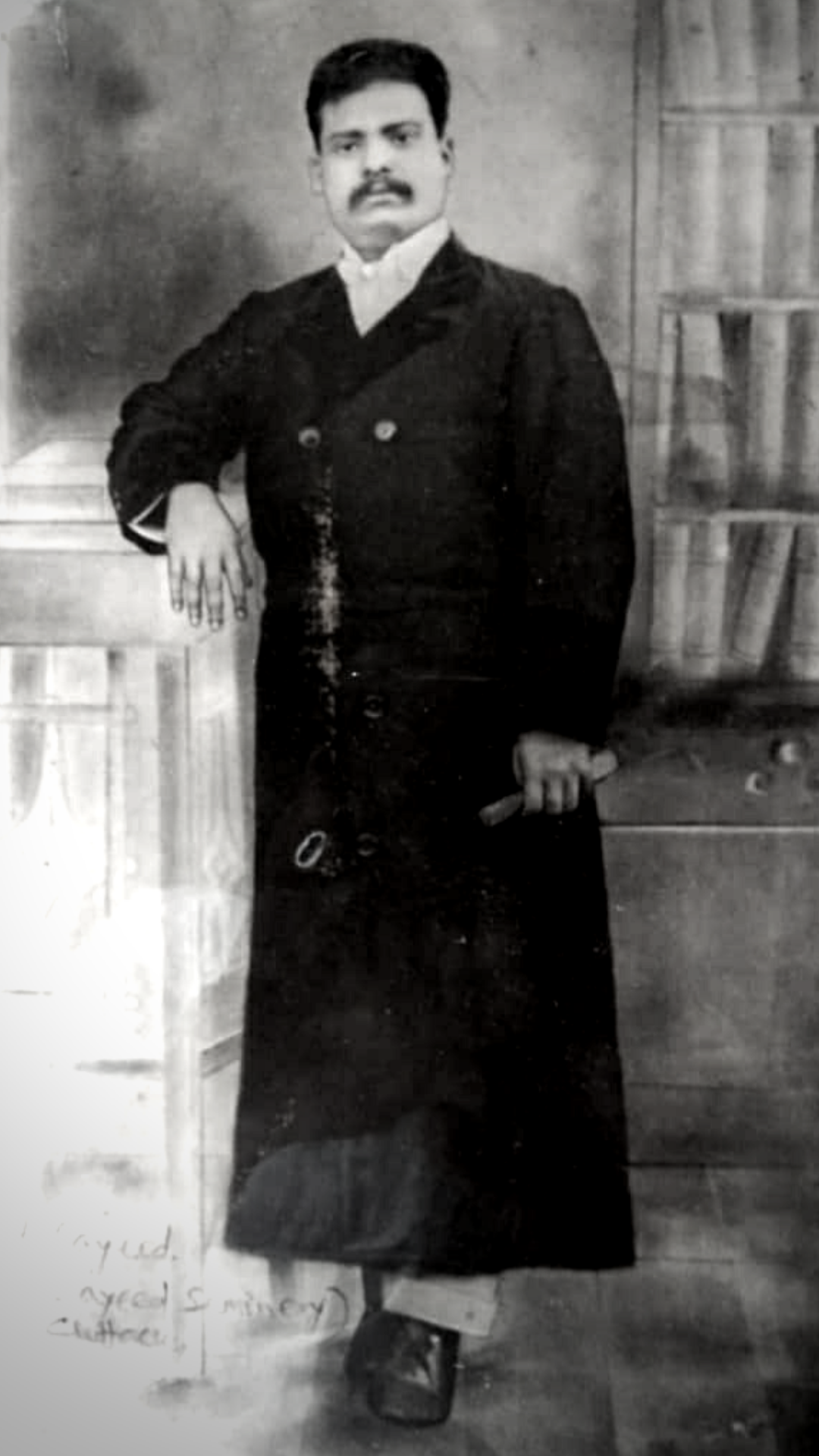
- Sayeed Mohammed, an Indian Odia educationist

Total population
- c. 911,670

Regions with significant populations
- India (Odisha)

Religions
- Islam Majority Sunni Minority Shia

Languages
- Majority:-Odia & Urdu Minority:- Hindi

Odia Muslims are a community of people hailing from the Indian state of Odisha who follow Islam. They mostly descend from indigenous converts to Islam along with a small proportion that migrated from northern India.

== History ==
=== Arrival and Early Contacts ===
It is uncertain when Islam first arrived in Odisha. It is believed that the first significant Islamic presence dates from the invasion of the Bengal general, Kalapahad. Commanding the army of Sultan Sulaiman Khan Karrani, the Sultan of Bengal, Kalapahad defeated Raja Mukund Deva of Cuttack in 1568, the Afghan ruler Sulaiman Khan Karrani of Bengal sent his general Kalapahad to invade Odisha. The defeat and death of the Hindu king Mukunda Deva ended the rule of the Eastern Ganga and Bhoi dynasties as independent powers, bringing parts of Odisha under Afghan control. This marked the first sustained Muslim political presence in the region.

=== Mughal Annexation ===
In 1592, the Mughal emperor Akbar annexed Odisha after defeating the Afghans, integrating it into the Bengal Subah. The Mughals organized the province into five sarkars—Jaleshwar, Bhadrak, Katak, Soro, and Rahangpur—and introduced Islamic administrative, legal, and architectural practices.

Cuttack, the provincial capital, became the main centre of Mughal administration, housing mosques, madrasas, and Sufi shrines.

=== Cultural and Religious Exchange ===
During Mughal rule, Odisha experienced a period of religious syncretism. Muslim saints and scholars established dargahs such as the Qadam-e-Rasool in Cuttack, revered by both Muslims and Hindus. The Satyapir cult emerged, blending Islamic and Hindu devotional traditions. The Odia language absorbed numerous Persian and Arabic loanwords, and poets like Salabega composed bhajans in praise of Lord Jagannath, further illustrating cross-faith cultural integration.

=== Decline of Mughal Power and Maratha Rule ===
By the mid-18th century, Mughal authority in Odisha waned, and in 1751 the Maratha Empire took control after a treaty with the Nawab of Bengal. Under the Marathas, Muslim institutions survived, though political influence diminished. Many Mughal-period mosques, tombs, and madrasas continued to be maintained through endowments (waqf).

=== British Annexation ===
The Second Anglo-Maratha War (1803) brought Odisha under British East India Company rule. Under the British, Muslims in Odisha lost most of their political privileges but retained cultural and religious autonomy through community institutions. Some prominent Muslim families adapted to new roles as landowners, traders, and artisans. Religious sites such as the Kaipadar shrine and Qadam-e-Rasool continued to attract pilgrims from across religious lines.

=== Role in Late Colonial Period ===
In the late 19th and early 20th centuries, Odisha’s Muslim community remained a small minority but participated in broader anti-colonial and reform movements. Muslim educational institutions, including traditional madrasas and modern schools, were active in Cuttack, Balasore, and Kendrapara. Local leaders engaged with the Indian National Congress and regional movements for Odia language and identity, while maintaining religious networks through waqf boards and Sufi orders.

== Demographics ==
Islam has had a very slow rate of growth in Odisha even during the Muslim rule as there had never been any major Muslim missionary work. The current population of Muslims in Odisha is 911,670 (2011 census), roughly 2.2% of the total population. The city of Bhadrak has the maximum number of Muslims as a percentage of the total population (about 35%).

Most Odisha Muslims are Sunni while a small minority are Shia, belonging to such groups as the Khoja and Dawoodi Bohra.

Historical Muslim Population of Odisha

Year	Pop.	±%
1951	176,338	—
1961	215,319	+22.1%
1971	326,507	+51.6%
1981	422,266	+29.3%

Year	Pop.	±%
1991	577,775	+36.8%
2001	761,985	+31.9%
2011	911,670	+19.6%

Muslim population by district in Odisha
Rank	District	Total population	Muslim population	Muslims as % of district	District's share of Odisha's Muslim population
1	Bhadrak	1,506,337	104,202	6.92%	11.43%
2	Cuttack	2,624,470	141,263	5.38%	15.49%
3	Jajapur	1,827,192	93,642	5.12%	10.27%
4	Jagatsinghpur	1,136,971	46,929	4.13%	5.15%
5	Baleshwar	2,320,529	94,254	4.06%	10.34%
6	Khordha	2,251,673	84,060	3.73%	9.22%
7	Kendrapara	1,440,361	50,247	3.49%	5.51%
8	Sundargarh	2,093,437	71,391	3.41%	7.83%
9	Puri	1,698,730	46,094	2.71%	5.06%
10	Jharsuguda	579,505	12,783	2.21%	1.40%
11	Sambalpur	1,041,099	20,120	1.93%	2.21%
12	Kendujhar	1,801,733	27,752	1.54%	3.04%
13	Mayurbhanj	2,519,738	33,706	1.34%	3.70%
14	Nuapada	610,382	4,952	0.81%	0.54%
15	Koraput	1,379,647	8,850	0.64%	0.97%
16	Anugul	1,273,821	7,512	0.59%	0.82%
17	Nabarangapur	1,220,946	6,753	0.55%	0.74%
18	Nayagarh	962,789	5,278	0.55%	0.58%
19	Bargarh	1,481,255	7,527	0.51%	0.83%
20	Rayagada	967,911	4,607	0.48%	0.51%
21	Balangir	1,648,997	7,811	0.47%	0.86%
22	Dhenkanal	1,192,811	4,805	0.40%	0.53%
23	Ganjam	3,529,031	13,315	0.38%	1.46%
24	Kalahandi	1,576,869	4,975	0.32%	0.55%
25	Malkangiri	613,192	1,871	0.31%	0.21%
26	Kandhamal	733,110	2,138	0.29%	0.23%
27	Gajapati	577,817	1,556	0.27%	0.17%
28	Subarnapur	610,183	1,566	0.26%	0.17%
29	Boudh	441,162	1,007	0.23%	0.11%
30	Deogarh	312,520	704	0.23%	0.08%
Odisha		41,974,218	911,670	2.17%	100.00%

=== Places with the largest proportions ===
The figures indicate percentage of Muslims within the districts:

- Jajapur
  - Sayadpur – 77.75%
  - Brahmabarada – 60%
  - Jajapur – 12%
- Bhadrak
  - Bhadrak – 40%
  - Dhamanagar– 47%

== Denominations ==
=== Sunni Muslims ===
The majority of the Muslim population in Odisha are adherents of Sunni Islam, predominantly following the Hanafi school of jurisprudence. Within the Sunni community, there are notable subgroups such as the Barelvi and Deobandi movements. These groups are primarily concentrated in urban centres like Cuttack and Bhubaneswar, reflecting historical influences and migration patterns.

=== Shia Muslims ===
A smaller segment of the Muslim community in Odisha adheres to Shia Islam. Communities such as the Khoja and Dawoodi Bohra have established their presence in key urban areas, contributing to the state's religious diversity.

=== Ahmadiyya Community ===
The Ahmadiyya community, though numerically smaller, actively engages in interfaith outreach and community initiatives. For instance, in regions like Soro, Ahmadi Muslims have participated in social and religious activities, underscoring their role in the local socio-religious landscape.

=== Sufi Traditions ===
Historically, Sufi traditions have significantly influenced Odisha's cultural and spiritual heritage. The establishment of dargahs (shrines) and the integration of syncretic practices into local customs highlight the enduring impact of Sufi mysticism in the region. Although Sufi practices are not classified as a separate denomination, they are interwoven with both Sunni and Shia traditions in Odisha.

== Education ==
Jamia Islamia Markazul Uloom, a centre of Deobandi Islamic study in Odisha, was founded in 1946 by Muhammad Ismail Katki, the third president of Jamiat Ulema Odisha. Important Barelvi Madrasa are located at Bhadrak.

== Notable people ==
- Syed Mustafiz Ahmed (1941–2017), former Welfare Minister
- Raja Syed Ekram Ali (1842–1890), 11th Raja of Tarakote
- Syed Ameer Ali (1849–1928), jurist, author and political leader
- Surat Alley (1905–1988), trade unionist and political activist
- Afzal-ul Amin (1915–1983), statesman and social worker
- Farhat Amin (born 1967), journalist and social activist
- Mohammed Ayoob (born 1942), professor
- A. M. Bachan, footballer
- Syed Irfan Ali Chaudhury (1842–1890), Raja of Tarakote
- Sofia Firdous (born 1992), MLA for Barabati-Cuttack
- Hussain Rabi Gandhi (1948–2023), author and cultural activist
- Mehmood Hussain (1950–2015), filmmaker and author
- Mohammad Shahid Jabbar (born 1965), football coach
- Muhammad Ismail Katki (1914–2005), Islamic scholar, author and politician
- Karamat Ali Karamat (1936–2022), Urdu poet, author, literary critic and mathematician
- Harun Rashid Khan (born 1955), deputy governor of the Reserve Bank of India
- Mohammad Mohsin (1942–2003), actor, director and producer
- Atharuddin Mohammed (1859–1931), Dewan of Dhenkanal State
- Khwaja Fazal Mohammed (1805–1868), Sufi philosopher
- Sayeed Mohammed (1891–1922), educationist and philanthropist
- Aparajita Mohanty (née Khan) (born 1962), actress
- Mohammed Moquim (born 1965), MLA for Barabati-Cuttack
- Amjad Najmi (1899–1974), poet, dramatist and prose writer
- Kafeel Ahmad Qasmi (born 1951), Islamic scholar, academician and litterateur
- S. S. Sajideen Qasmi (1939–2006), Islamic scholar, poet, and orator
- Ibrahim Suhrawardy (1896–1971), educationist and linguist

== See also ==
- Islam in India
