= Mohammed Muqim =

Mohammed Muqim may refer to:

- Muhammad Muqim, 17th-century maker of scientific instruments; one of the third generation of the Lahore family of astrolabists
- Mirza Muhammad Muqim Ali Khan (1708–1754), second Nawab of Awadh
- Sayyid Muhammad Muqim, 18th-century Bengali poet
- Sardar Muhammad Muqeem Khan Khoso (1949–2016), Pakistani politician and tribal leader
- Mohammed Muqueem (born 1953), Indian politician and former MP of Domariyaganj
- Mohammed Moquim (born 1965), Indian politician and MLA of Barabati-Cuttack
