= Sikandar Alam =

- Salabega of Modern Odisha
- Born: 27 July 1939; Routrapur, Bayalishi mauza Cuttack, Orissa Province, British India
- Died: 8 August 2010 (aged 71); Bhubaneswar, Odisha, India
- Education: Christ Collegiate School, Gandharva Mahavidyalaya
- Occupations: Playback singer, lyricist, composer, songwriter, writer
- Spouse: Naima Alam
- Children: 2 daughters

Sikandar Alam
- Labels: SKS Music Company, USMP, EMI, Saregama

Md. Sikandar Alam (Odia: ସିକନ୍ଦର ଆଲାମ; 27 July 1939 – 8 August 2010) was a playback singer in Odisha film industry (known as Ollywood). He is sometimes called the Salabega of modern Odisha.

In an interview with Monalisa Jena, he said, "I can't appreciate the changing trends where music has become an instrument of titillation with vulgar lyrics. True music soothes the frayed nerves and makes one forget one's mundane life".

== Childhood and education ==
Alam was born on 27 July 1939 in Routrapur, Baialishi Mouzaa of Cuttack district. The family moved to Cuttack, where he completed his Matriculation at Christ Collegiate School and his Intermediate in Science at Stewart College. Sikandar then attended the Gandharva Mahavidyalaya to study vocal Hindustani classical music. He later studied Odissi music from Pt Balakrushna Dash.

== Professional career ==
His first work in the entertainment industry was with All India Radio in 1957. His debut in films was in the movie Laxmi (1964), directed by Balakrushna Dash. He sang in 50 Odia films, including Amada Bata, Adina Megha, Manika Jodi, Mamata, Suryamukhi and Puja, and recorded over 2,000 songs, earning the sobriquet "the Salabega of modern Odisha". He created a music album called Ala ke Huzur with his wife and daughter.

He had performed both in India and internationally. He is credited as the first Odia singer to be heard on BBC London.

On 8 August 2010, he died in a city nursing home in Bhubaneswar at the age of 71. He was admitted to the hospital due to prolonged illness.

== Family ==
His father was an IPS officer. His wife Naima Alam, was from Kolkata. She was also a singer of Hindustani classical music, and worked at All India Radio. His eldest daughter Sophia Alam is a television actress and his youngest daughter Nazia Alam is an Odissi classical singer.

== Awards and recognition ==
- 1969 – Chitrapuri Award
- 1980 – Soor Sagar Title from Sri Khetra Kala Prakashani, Puri
- 1981 – Dharitri Samman
- 1983 – Odisha Society of America
- 1990 – Odisha State Film Award By Culture Department
- 1991 – Santok Singh Award
- 1991 – Cine Critic Award for Best Playback Singer
- 1995 – Salabega Samman by Salabega Sanskrutika Parishad, Puri
- 1999 – Chinta-O-Chetana Samman
- 1999 – Award From Beach Festival, Chandipur
- 2000 – Chalachitra Sahasrabadi Award
- 2000 – Sarankul Art College & Music Samman
- 2000 – Saraswati Samman from Balakrushna Das Foundation
- 2000 – Odisha Sangeet Natak Academy Award
- 2001 – Akashavani Abasara Binodana Kendra Award
- 2001 – Soor Taranga Award
- 2002 – Nehru Yuba Kendra Award
- 2003 – Kalakar Boita Bandana Utshav, Angul
- 2003 – Sangeet Shree Samman from P.R. Deptt., West Bengal
- 2003 – Rajiv Gandhi Samman Award
- 2003 – Rourkela Steel Plant Award
- 2003 – Lion's Club Award
- 2004 – Bani Chitra Award
- 2004 – Akashya Mohanty Award
- 2004 – Utkal Felicitation in Odisha Festival, Kolkata
- 2005 – Shanti Devi Purskar, Bhadrak
