= Christ College, Cuttack =

College in Odisha, India

Coordinates: 20.4797°N 85.8617°E

- Type: Degree College, Autonomous
- Established: 1944
- Affiliation: Utkal University
- Academic staff: ~80 (Approximate)
- Students: ~3500 (Approximate)
- Location: Cuttack, Odisha, India
- Campus: Urban
- Language: English, Odia
- Website: christcollege.ac.in

Christ College, Cuttack is a degree college located in Cuttack, Odisha, India. Established in 1944, it is affiliated with Utkal University.

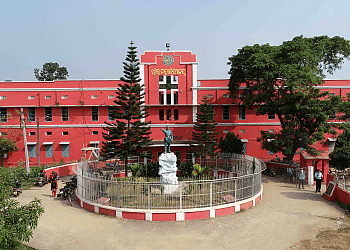
Christ College campus

== History ==
Christ College was founded in 1944 as Utkal Christian College by the Cuttack Christian Education Board. It initially functioned as an Intermediate College in Arts, affiliated with Utkal University. In 1946-47, it became a Degree College in Arts, offering honors courses in English and Oriya. The college was renamed Christ College in 1949 and moved to its current location in 1951. Science classes were introduced in 1960. +2 and +3 courses in Arts & Science were introduced in 1983-84 and 1985–86, respectively.

== Academics ==
The college offers undergraduate and postgraduate courses in various disciplines, including:

- English
- Odia
- History
- Political Science
- Economics
- Physics
- Chemistry
- Mathematics
- Botany
- Zoology
- Commerce
- Philosophy
- Sanskrit
- Psychology
- Home Science
- Electronics
- Education

Christ College is an autonomous institution, allowing it to design its own syllabus and conduct examinations.

== Campus ==
The campus is located in Cuttack and includes academic buildings, laboratories, a library, hostels, and sports facilities.

== Notable alumni ==
The Department of History at Christ College has produced several notable alumni, including:

- Sri Nirmal Chandra Mishra (IAS, District Collector of Khurda)
- Sri Samir Dey (Politician)
- Many others who have achieved success in various fields.
