= Kadampara =

Kadampada
- Village
- Interactive map of Kadampada
- Coordinates: 20.408939°N 85.917512°E
- Country: India
- State: Odisha
- District: Cuttack

Languages
  - Official: Odia
- Time zone: UTC+5:30 (IST)
- Vehicle registration: OD
- Website: odisha.gov.in

Kadampada is a village situated on a river island in the Cuttack district, in the state of Odisha, India. The island is called 42 Mouza, meaning Group of 42 Villages. The other neighbourly villages of Kadampada are Aitalanga, Dadhibamanpur, Baulakuda and Jhinkiria.

== Facilities ==
Kadampada is one of the unique villages with facilities like a high school named Parbati Vidya Pitha situated behind Sudarshan Mahavidyalaya college, a cold store which is the biggest in eastern India, and its own youth club named "Juba Jyoti Jubaka Sangha, Kadampada". The literacy rate of this village is nearly 74 percent. Most of the People here depend on Agriculture for their Lives.

A small canal called 'Malia' (now, a stagnant water body) is the lifeline of the agrarian village. Inhabitants of the village use the canal water for irrigation, pisciculture and bathing purposes. River 'Sidhua' (a tributary of Kathajodi) flows with a sweet murmur on the westernside of the village.

== Religion ==
Krishna, or Lord Gopinath and Maa Jaduani, is worshipped as the village deity. Kadampada celebrates 'Dolyatra' with much pomp and victory in mid-March beforeHoli. The village also houses a 'Satsang Kendra'.
