= Chinta Kamodi =

Rāga of the tradition of Odissi music

- Odia script: ଚିନ୍ତା କାମୋଦୀ
- Melā: Sri
- Jati: Oudaba - Bakra Sampurna
- Badi: Rusabha
- Sambadi: Panchama
- Allied Ragas: Rasa Kamodi

Chinta Kamodi (Odia: ଚିନ୍ତା କାମୋଦୀ, romanized: chintā kāmodi) is a rāga belonging to the tradition of Odissi music. Falling under the meḷa Sri, the raga uses both suddha nisada and komala nisada swaras and is traditionally associated with the bhakti rasa. Occasionally, the komala gandhara is employed in a bakra prayoga.

== Structure ==
An ancient raga, Chinta Kamodi is accepted as one of the primary melas in Odissi music due to its prominence. It has been used by hundreds of poet-composers for well-over the past many centuries. Its bakra or devious aroha-abaroha are given below:

Aroha: S R M P D S

Abaroha: S N D n D P M G R S

== Compositions ==
Some of the well-known traditional compositions in this raga include:

- Ahe Nila Saila by Salabega
- Mana Uddharana Kara He Karana by Upendra Bhanja
