= Hussain Rabi Gandhi =

Indian writer and politician (1948–2023)

Utkala Jyoti Hussain Rabi Gandhi
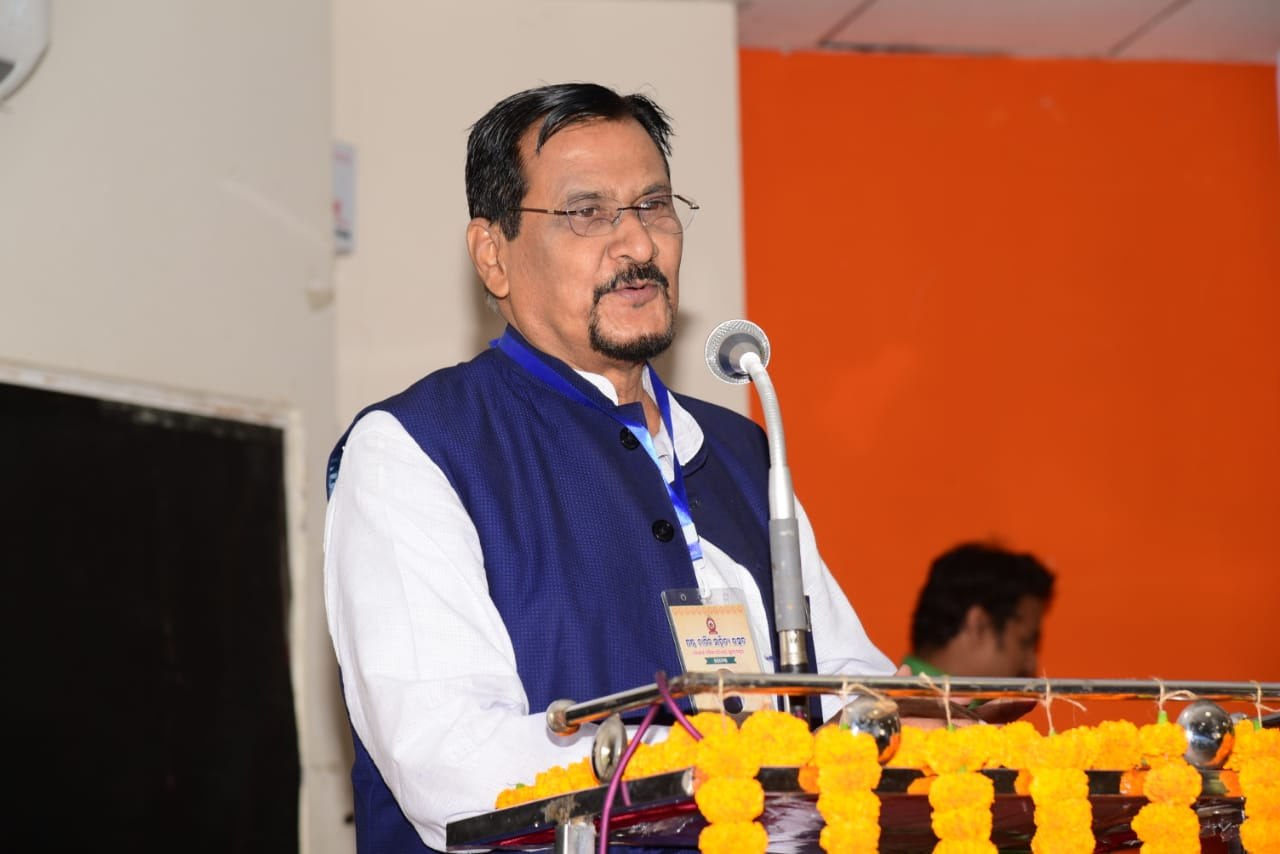
- Born: 23 April 1948; Mufti Bagh, Haldigadia, Jajpur, Odisha, India
- Died: 28 January 2023 (aged 74); Cuttack, Odisha, India
- Education: Gangadhar Meher University; Sambalpur University
- Occupations: Writer, politician
- Spouse: Tabasum Amin Sultana
- Relatives: Sayeed Mohammed (grandfather in law); Mehmood Hussain (younger brother); Afzal-ul Amin (father-in-law); Farhat Amin (sister-in-law)
- Writing career
- Language: Odia
- Period: Late 20th century
- Genres: Poetry, short story
- Notable works: Mukta Purbasha; Galpa Samaraha; Shabda Brahma; Lokageeta
- Notable awards: Gangadhar Meher Kabita Saman (2015), Secular India Harmony Award (1993)
- Movement: Revolutionary Humanism

Signature
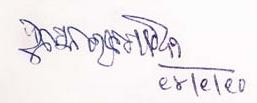

Hussain Rabi Gandhi (also spelled Hussain Rabigandhi or Husen Rabi Gandhi; 23 April 1948 – 28 January 2023) was an Indian Odia writer of the late-twentieth century, a politician, a public intellectual and a cultural activist hailing from the Indian state of Odisha. Being a founder member of Biju Janata Dal, he served as the general secretary of the party from upon its formation in 1998 till 2005. In 1994 the title of Biplabi Loka Kabi was conferred upon him by the Mayor of Cuttack. He was also awarded with the title of Utkala Jyoti in 1996 by the then Deputy chief minister of Odisha, Basant Kumar Biswal on the behalf of Freedom Fighter's Organisation. Gandhi primarily wrote in Odia language and was bestowed with the Secular India Harmony Award in 1993 by the former President of India, Giani Zail Singh and with the Gangadhar Meher Kabita award in 2015 for his notable contributions to the field of Odia poetry. Hussain served as the President of Odisha Sahitya Akademi (2008–2010). He was famously known as the Gandhi of Korei and was regarded as a bridge between Western Odisha and Coastal Odisha. He also served as Lead Member of Smt. Nandini Satpathy Memorial Trust (SNSMT).

== Early life and education ==
Hussain was born as Sahibzada Fazal e Haq Mohammad Hussain on 23 April 1948, in Mufti Bagh, Jajpur into the royal family of Tarakot. He was the eldest son of Mohammed Mozammil Hussain and his wife Bibi Sahiba Salma Khatoon. He was the grandson of Raja Miyan Dabiruddin Mohammad, the last ruler of Tarakote State. His great-grandfather was Tajdar e Tarakote Raja Syed Ekram Ali. The critically acclaimed film director and author, Mehmood Hussain was his younger brother.

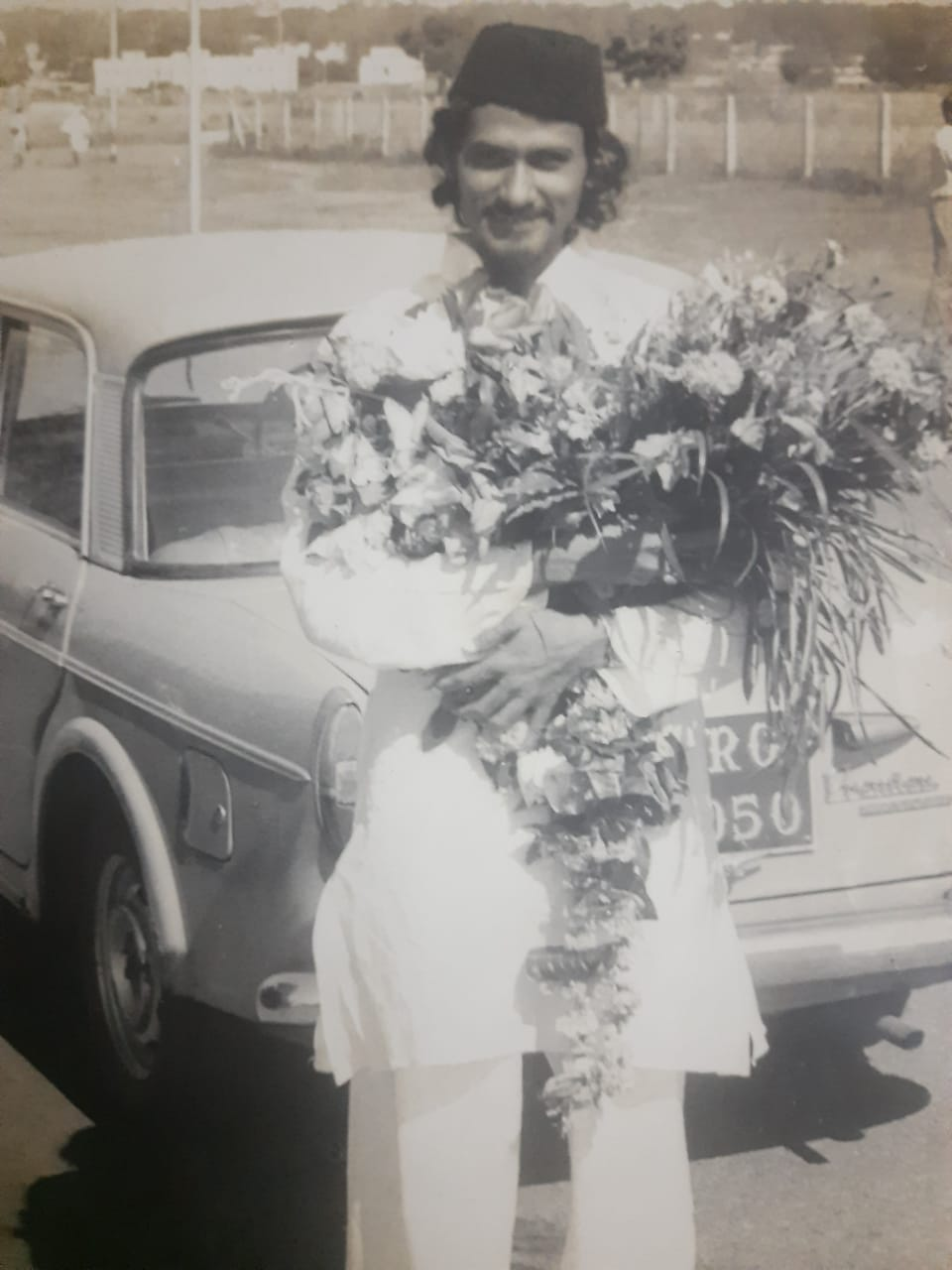
Fazal e Haq Mohammad Hussain, the 15th Raja Miyan Saheb of Tarakote Raj

Gandhi attended school first at Korai ME (Middle English) school and then at Bargarh George high school. Hussain graduated and finished his master's degree in history from Gangadhar Meher College, Sambalpur. He then did his L.L.B. from Lajpat Rai Law College in Sambalpur. He practiced law for a brief period of time in Odisha High Court, Cuttack. As he studied in different parts of Odisha, it gave him the opportunity to learn the different dialects prevalent in different regions of Odisha. He later did his PhD in Odia literature from Utkal University in 1990.

== Career ==
Gandhi's political career started as early as in his youth days when he was elected as the President of the Students Union at Gangadhar Meher College. He also served as the President of Students Union at L.R law college at Sambalpur.

During the 1969 historic students strike in Odisha, Gandhi was appointed the chairman of the Western Odisha students action committee. He had conducted and participated in various strikes all over Odisha and was imprisoned several times for the same. Gandhi also wrote poems to mobilize the students, which earned him the titles of 'Rabi' and 'Gandhi'.

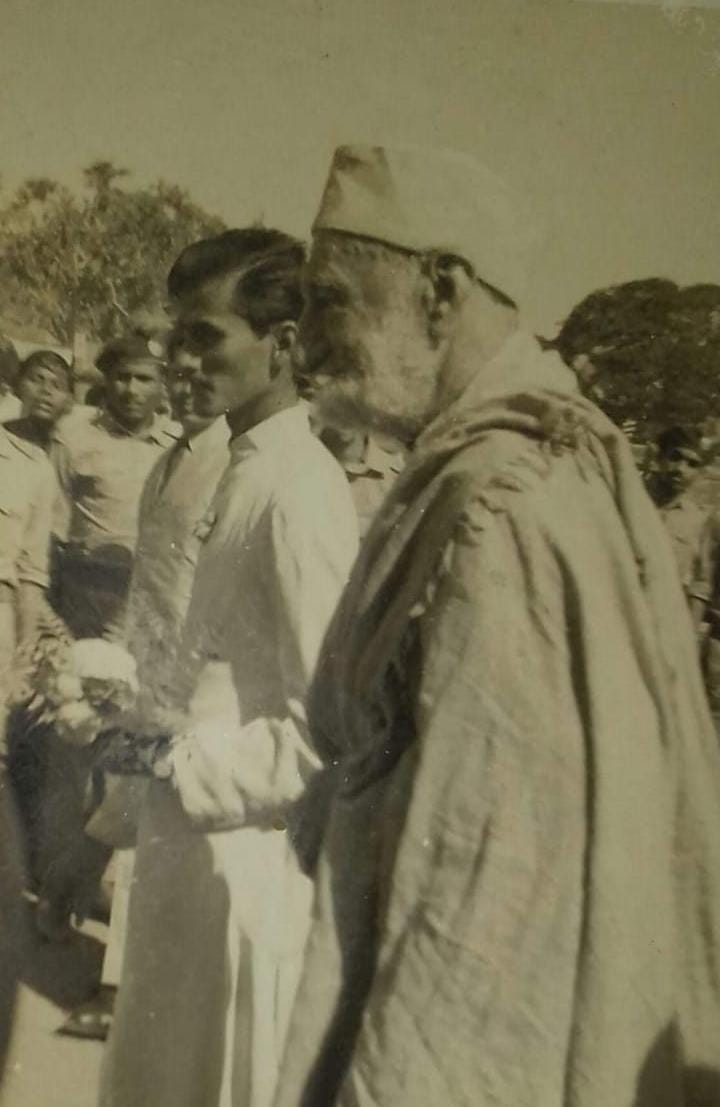
Hussain, as the President of Student's Union, escorting Khan Abdul Ghaffar Khan during the silver jubilee ceremony of Gangadhar Meher University.

In 1985 he contested the state assembly elections from Korai constituency under the Jagrat Odisha party formed by the former chief minister of Odisha, Nandini Satpathy.

In 1987 Vishwanath Pratap Singh, the former Prime Minister of India founded the Jan Morcha (The people's front), Gandhi served as the President of the party's regional youth branch in Odisha.

Under the influence of Biju Patnaik, Hussain joined the undivided Janata Dal in 1988 and was appointed the General secretary of the party by Pattnaik. In the 1989 General elections he was appointed the Vice Chairman of the campaign committee of the Janta Dal and finally in 1990, after the massive victory of the party in the state assembly elections, Hussain was appointed the chairman of Odisha state leather corporation Ltd by Biju Patnaik. During his tenure (1990-1995), he expanded the tannery business and had increased the shoe production by establishing 13 shoe manufacturing units all over Odisha. In December 1997, the Janta Dal was divided and a new political party called the Biju Janata Dal was formed. Hussain was one among the founding members of the party along with Dilip Ray, Bijoy Mohapatra, Prasanna Acharya, Ananga Udaya Singh Deo and Amar Sathpathy. In January 1998 he was appointed the General Secretary of the Biju Janata Dal by the current chief minister of Odisha, Naveen Patnaik and had served as the party observer for Deogarh and Sambalpur elections.

Gandhi was active in politics as a member of the Biju Janata Dal. Gandhi was also the co-founder secretary of Maulana Azad Multipurpose College, Cuttack. Gandhi appeared as a guest judge in many popular Odia reality TV shows including, Taraang TV's "The Odisha Great Political Circus" and Odisha TV's "Ashaa ra Aloka".

Gandhi was also active in Odia literary scene. He was associated with the movement to revive Revolutionary Humanism in Odia poetry. His published works included poetry collection Mukta Purbasha, Loka Geeta and short story collection Ajira Galpa. He was appointed the editor of Utkala Prasnga, a cultural monthly published of Government of Odisha in 2010.

Gandhi served as the Vice-President (2005-2008) and then the President of Odisha Sahitya Akademi from 28 May 2008 to 27 May 2010. During his term the Odisha Sahitya Academy celebrated its Golden Jubilee in 22 districts of Odisha.

== Personal life ==
Gandhi married Tabasum Amin Sultana, the eldest daughter of veteran Congress leader and social worker, Afzal-ul Amin and the granddaughter of the notable educationist and freedom fighter from Cuttack, Sayeed Mohammed.

== Books ==
Kabya

Gandhi authored 23 books including :

- Mukta Purbasa (1983)
- Singhasana Bhangiba Ra Karjyakrama (1999)
- Hussain Rabi Gandhinka Lokageeta (1985)
- Niyanta Ratira Swapna (1999)
- Binsa Ru Ek Binsa (2007)
- Shabda Brahma (2006)
- Lokageeta o anyanya kabita (2011)
- Karna
- Srestha Kabita (2007)
- Srestha Kabita Utarparba (2014)
- Nijaku Khojuthiba Bele (2013)
- Hajijaithiba Manisa (2018)
- Punsacha Salabega (2017)
- Pragatisila Kabita (2010)
- Kabi Manasare Gandhi
- Gandhi Kabita Sankalana
- Galpika Dayanidhi Mishranka Galpajagat
- Lokageeta (2nd vol) (2020)
- Punascha Salabega (2nd Vol) (2020)
- Mukta Purbasa (2nd Vol) (2021)

Story

- Ajira Galpa
- Galpa Samaraha (was included in +2 M.I.L (Odia) Syllabus.)

Gandhi also translated the Hindi novel "Rani Laxmi Bai" into Odia which was later published by National book trust of India in the year 2012.

== Notable awards ==
- Gangadhar Meher Kabita Samman
- Secular India Harmony Award
- Bartika Samman
- Gokarnika Puraskar
- Nayagarh Zilla Lekhak Parishad Kabita Puraskar
- Khurda Jilla Lekhak Parishad Kabita Samman
- Roupya Jayanti Kabita Purasakar
- Chalapatha Sahitya Puraskar
- Nilachakra Samman
- Nilashoka Samman
- Baishakhi Sahitya Samman
- Bhimabhoi Samman
- Byasangar Press Forum Sambardhana
- Sahitya Darpan Samman

== Death ==
Gandhi died on 28 January 2023, at the age of 74. The Chief Minister of Odisha, Naveen Patnaik expressed his grief and said "Late Gandhi was a veteran leader long associated with Biju Babu and later with Biju Janata Dal. He has contributed immensely in strengthening the BJD and promoted the values of Biju Babu and BJD. He was an established writer and contributed immensely for Odia literature. His death is a great loss to the state." The Governor of Odisha, Ganeshi Lal said "I am deeply saddened by the death of noted poet, orator and politician Hussain Rabi Gandhi. His contribution to the enrichment of Odia literature is unbelievable."

Gandhi's last rites were held at Qadam e Rasool, Cuttack and was attended by several prominent personalities including, Subhash Chandra Singh, Bhabani Shankar Dayani, Pravat Biswal, Munna Khan, Prafulla Samal among others.

While Manas Mangaraj, Prasanna Kumar Patasani, Sujeet Kumar, Pratap Jena, Naba Das, Lalatendu Bidyadhar Mohapatra, Ramesh Chandra Majhi, Shashi Bhusan Behera, Sarmistha Sethi, Bhajaman Behara, Dinesh Sarangi, Tathagata Satpathy and other leaders reached out to the family to pay their condolences. Many Odia writers opined that Gandhi's death marked the end of the Salabega age of Odia literature.

== Bibliography ==
- Gandhi, Husen Rabi (1982). Mukta purbasa (in Odia). Odisa Buk Shtora. OCLC 17870156.
- Rabi Gandhi, Hussain (1984). Ajira galpa-84 : Odia yuba lekhaka sammelana anukulyate samkalita sampratika kathasahitya (in Odia). Odisa Buk Shtora. OCLC 499621463.
- Husen Rabigandhi (1993). Galpa samahara (in Odia). Odisa Buk Shtora. OCLC 499751715.
- Gandhi, Husen Rabi (1999). Nianta ratira svapna (in Odia). Citrotpala Pablikesanas. OCLC 45556619.
- Gandhi, Husen Rabi (1999). Simhasana bhangibara karyyakrama (in Odia). Odisa Buk Shtora. ISBN 81-7400-209-X. OCLC 46618253.
- Gandhi, Husen Rabi (2006). Bimsaru ekabimsa (in Odia). Odisa Buk Shtora. ISBN 81-7400-476-9. OCLC 86118136.
- Gandhi, Husen Rabi (2007). Sabdabrahma (in Odia). Jnanayuga Pablikesana. ISBN 978-81-89726-40-9. OCLC 300278221.
