= Mehmood Hussain =

Indian filmmaker

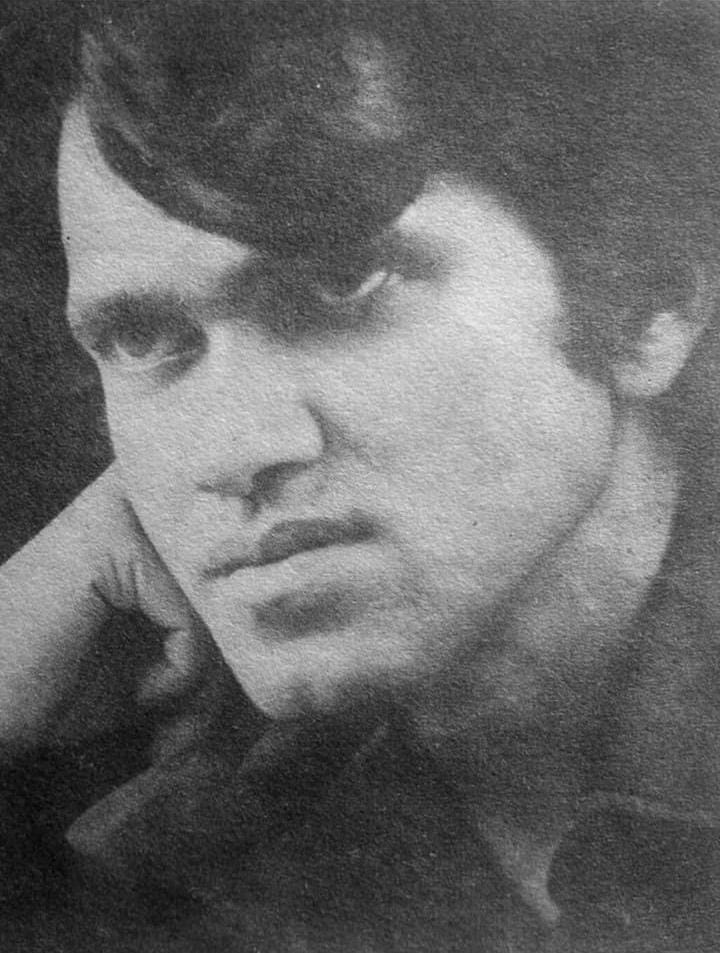
- Born: 15 March 1950; Muftibagh, Haldigadia, Jajpur, Odisha, India
- Died: 11 November 2015 (aged 65); Bhubaneswar, Odisha
- Education: Sambalpur University, Jawaharlal Nehru University, FTII
- Occupations: Director; Producer; Author; Journalist; Academician
- Years active: 1981 – 2015
- Spouse: Nasim Saher
- Relatives: Hussain Rabi Gandhi (elder brother)

Mehmood Hussain was an Indian filmmaker, avant-garde auteur, director and author hailing from the Indian state of Odisha. Mehmood's feature films and documentaries had represented India in four International film festivals. His first feature film Unwanted was India's lone entry at Cannes film festival, France in 1985. Mehmood has authored the book "The Palestine Liberation Organisation : A study in ideology, strategy and tactics" for which he was bestowed with the honorary citizenship of the free Palestine state by the interim state of Palestine. In his 25 years of filming career, Mehmood had written, produced and directed 74 short films, various TV programmes, serials, documentaries and feature films. Mehmood's film "Ulgulan", is Odisha's first period drama movie.

== Early life and education ==
Mehmood Hussain was born in Mufti Bagh, Jajpur into the royal family of Shergarh-Tarakote to Mohammed Muzammil Hussain and his wife, Bibi Sahiba Salma Khatoon. He was the great grandson of Tajdar e Tarakote, Raja Syed Ekram Ali. The notable Odia author and politician, Hussain Rabi Gandhi is his elder brother. Mehmood's grandfather Mohammed Dabiruddin was the last ruler of Tarakote State.

Mehmood finished his schooling from Brajanath Bada Jena high school. He then matriculated from Sambalpur Zilla High school in 1965. Mehmood earned a graduation degree in Political Science from Sambalpur University. He went ahead and did his master's degree in political science from Delhi University. He did his MPhil and PhD from school of International studies at Jawaharlal Nehru University, New Delhi. Mehmood later developed interest in filmmaking and decided to change his track. In 1981 he earned a diploma in Cinema (Direction) from the prestigious FTII, Pune.

== Career ==
Mehmood worked as a columnist for Times of India and had written several articles for The Hindustan times, Patriot, National Herald and Filmfare. He also worked as a correspondent for the English service of German Radio (Deutsche Welle). He served as the editor of Orissa Industry.

Frustrated with constant academic hurdles despite incessantly writing for leading reputed Indian dailies, weeklies and research journals like Times of India, Hindustan Times, Patriot, National Herald, Economic & Political Weekly as well as authoring Palestine Liberation Organization, the then most well documented and pioneering work hitherto on a subject unknown to western world. The academicians of the University acted more often like bureaucrats to scuttle his academic career. He changed his track and joined the Film and Television Institute of India (FTII) to become a director. His diploma film, The Unveiling, is still considered as a classic taught to students of film direction at FTII. Fed up with constant academic hurdles set up by academicians who acted more often behaved bureaucrats to scuttle his progress, he changed the track and joined the Film and Television Institute of India (FTII) to become a director. His diploma film, The Unveiling, is still considered as a classic taught to students of film direction at FTII. The second phase is often laced with his journalistic ventures. His life was a paradigm of struggle for an uncompromising existence on his own terms. Shunning commercial offers, he struggled to make his first feature film Unwanted (English/1985) which was a semi-autobiographical one that showcased his own political and existential philosophy. It represented India as the lone entry at Cannes in 1985, earning various International laurels . His craft was highly influenced by works of Antonioni and Fellini. His biggest limitation was the shoestring budget that his producers allotted. In between the phases of film making and struggle for survival, he often delved into journalism and masterfully analyzed the socio-economic-politico spectra of his time in various magazines, he worked as a radio journalist for German Radio (Deutsche Ville) and also edited magazines/weeklies. He also worked as a Producer and Director of Iranian Television and production in a leading Television Channel, ATN. He later gave up the job finding it too suffocating for his independent auteur driven creative art.

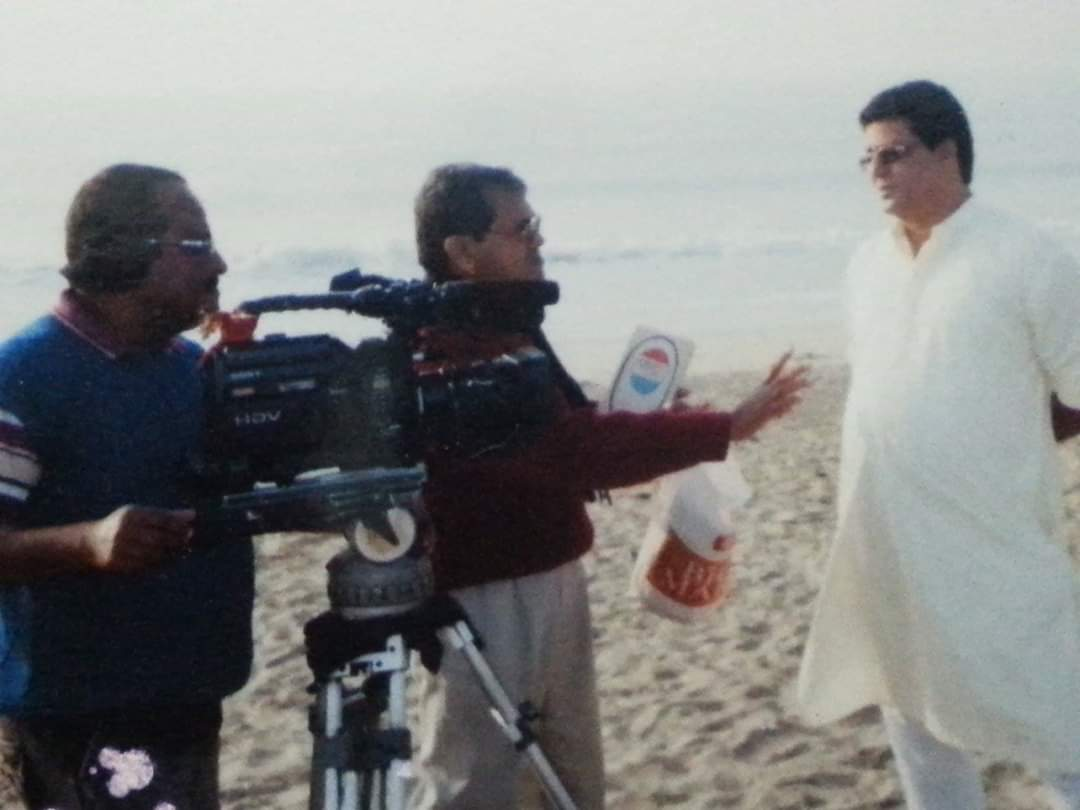
Mehmood Hussain directing

His short tele-documentaries and telefilms are often considered benchmark for Odia television medium which was hither to besotted with morbid, lunatic, loud and melodramatic story-telling. His Odia tele-serial Kunti Kuntala Sakuntala is a montage of three female characters sui generis referral work for tele-serial making of Odia and Indian Television (Doordarshan). His other compelling Odia Tele serial was Bajrabahu (Iron Hand). His 74 documentaries on various subjects ranging from biographical Maulana Abul Kalam Azad and other subjects bear ample testimony of classical cases of study in the making of film and television. His second and last feature film were Rashmi Rekha (Odia/1998) and Ulgulan (Sambalpuri-Odia/2009) respectively were each worth studying.

One can draw a parallel between the works of Mehmood Hussain and Ritwik Ghatak so far as they resemble in montage except that while Ghatak's last movie Jukti Tarko aur Gopo had a confusing ending while Mehmood answered the dilemma of Ghatak in Unwanted to create a new world.

== Books ==
Mehmood had written and published two famous books namely :

- The Palestine Liberation Organisation : A study in Ideology, Strategy and Tactics. The book was released by the then Congress President, D. K. Barooah and the former Prime Minister of India, Inder Kumar Gujral, the then external affairs minister of India.
- The Revolutionary Arabs : The Unfinished Agenda, the book was released by the foreign minister of Palestine, Nabil Sha'ath on 31 August 2003.

== Filmography ==
Mehmood has directed and produced 74 short films documentaries and TV serials on the culture, ethos, issues and art of India. Some of his notable short films include Geeta, Historic Shahjahanabad, Darool Waloom, Prakruti Kola re Adivasi Mahila (A film on UNDP sub plan), Street Children, Padadip Port, Andhararu Alua, Sixty years of Odia Cinema, part 1, Sixty years of Odia Cinema part 2, Rail Roko, Children of Blind Alley, Hindu temple art of Odisha and several others.

His most notable film Unwanted received International Award Young Jury Prize at International Festival for Author's films, Sanremo, Italy. Mehmood's other notable films include, Rashmi Rekha (1998) and Ulgulan (2009) which received 3 state film awards. Another short film Children of Darkness participated in the International Festival of TV films for children and youth, Prix Danube at Bratislava, Czechoslovakia in 1991. His film A Cry Strangled on female foeticide inspired the Maharashtra government to ban the practices of amniocentesis for sex determination. Some of his classical biographical documentaries are on Maulana Abul Kalam Azad and Sitakanta Mohapatra.

Year	Film	Director	Producer	Writer	Actor	Cinematographer
1983	The High Priest of Revolution	Yes		Yes		
1985	Unwanted	Yes		Yes		
1987	Face to Face with Naxalism	Yes		Yes		
1987	A date with Democracy	Yes		Yes		
1988	The Path	Yes		Yes		
1988	Garibi Hathao	Yes	Yes	Yes		
1993	Saint Poet Jashobant Das	Yes	Yes	Yes		
1993	Creative Handloom	Yes	Yes	Yes		
1998	Rashmi Rekha	Yes				
2001	Tribals of Orissa	Yes	Yes	Yes		
2009	Ulgulan	Yes		Yes		

== Television ==
Mehmood has directed the classic Kunti Kuntala Shakuntala (four episodes) TV serial which was commissioned by Doordarshan and the Indian classic Bajrabahu (five episodes) specially commissioned by the director general of Doordarshan.

== Personal life ==
Mehmood Hussain married Nasim Saher. He has two daughters Nausheen Hanan Hussain and Farheen Hussain.

== Death ==
Mehmood died on 11 November 2015 at his residence. He was suffering from brain cancer.

== Bibliography ==
• Mehmood Hussain, The Palestine liberation organisation : a study in ideology, strategy and tactics, OCLC: 906138467, http://www.worldcat.org/oclc/906138467 • Mehmood Hussain, The revolutionary Arabs the unfinished agenda, OCLC: 249633485, http://www.worldcat.org/oclc/249633485
