= Routrapur =

- Village
- Interactive map of Routrapur
- Coordinates: 20.398°N 85.961°E
- Country: India
- State: Odisha
- District: Cuttack

Population
  - Total: 1,832
- Households: 379
- Area: 120 hectares
- Postal Address: AT- Routrapur, PO - Kalapada, PS - Cuttack Sadar, District - Cuttack, Odisha.
- PIN: 754112

Routrapur is a village of the 42 Mouza island situated on the banks of Kathajodi river of Cuttack Sadar Tehsil, Cuttack district, Odisha under Cuttack Sadar Block, Near about 8 kilometres (5.0 mi) from Cuttack Town. It is known as the birthplace of legend Odia singer Sikandar Alam formerly known as Salabega of Modern Odisha.

According to Census 2011 information the location code or village code of Rautrapur village is 400074. It is situated 10 km away from sub-district headquarter Cuttack Sadar and 15 km away from district headquarter Cuttack. Kalapada is the Gram Panchayat of Rautrapur village. Ration card of routrapur
