= Sofia Firdous =

Indian politician

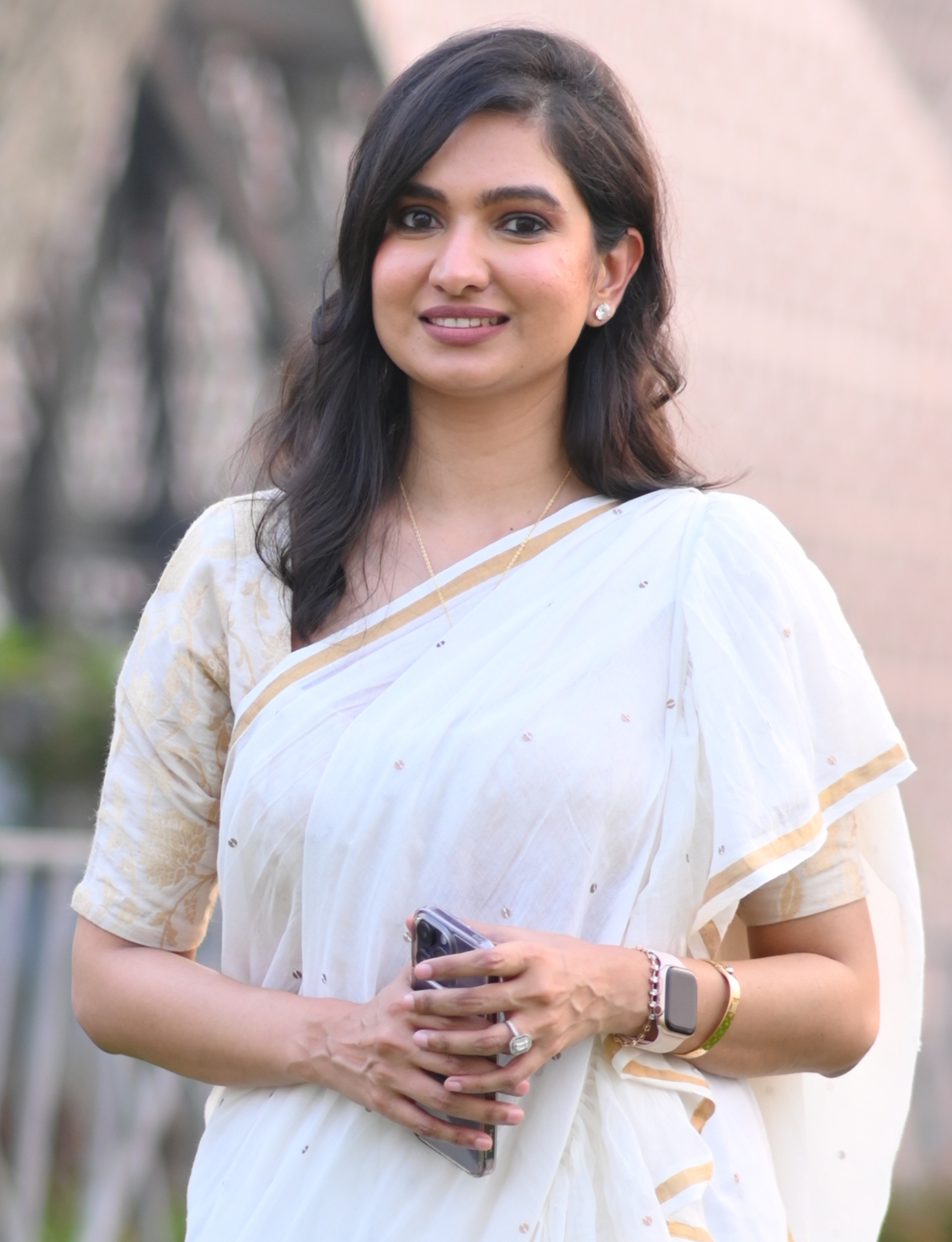

Member of Odisha Legislative Assembly
- Incumbent
- Assumed office 4 June 2024
- Preceded by: Mohammed Moquim
- Constituency: Barabati-Cuttack

Personal details
- Born: 23 August 1991 (age 35) Cuttack, Odisha
- Party: Independent (March 2026-Present)
- Other political affiliations: Indian National Congress (till 2026)
- Parent: Mohammed Moquim
- Education: KIIT (B.Tech); IIM Bangalore

Sofia Firdous (born 23 August 1991) is an Indian politician and a sitting member of the Odisha Legislative Assembly from Barabati-Cuttack. As a member of the Indian National Congress, Sofia Firdous became the first woman from the Odia Muslim , as well as the first millennial, to be elected as a Member of the Odisha Legislative Assembly. On 17 March 2026, Sofia Firdous was expelled from the Indian National Congress after defying the party whip by voting in favour of a candidate backed by the Bharatiya Janata Party in a Rajya Sabha election.

== Early life and education ==
Sofia Firdous was born on 23 August 1991 in Cuttack, Odisha. She is the daughter of Mohammed Moquim, a former Member of the Odisha Legislative Assembly (2019-2024) from the Barabati-Cuttack Assembly constituency. She completed her early education at St. Joseph's Girls's High School in Cuttack and Ravenshaw Junior College. She later pursued a Bachelor of Technology in Civil Engineering from Kalinga Institute of Industrial Technology, KIIT University in Bhubaneswar, graduating in 2013. She furthered her education by completing an Executive General Management Program at the Indian Institute of Management Bangalore, in 2022.

== Career ==
=== Early career and entrepreneurship ===
Before entering politics, Sofia Firdous was an established entrepreneur. She worked as a director at Metro Group, where she played a pivotal role in realty and asset development ventures. Her responsibilities spanned various facets of business, including operations, management, marketing, and overall growth. In addition to her entrepreneurial ventures, Sofia held significant positions in several business and industry organizations. She served as the President of CREDAI Bhubaneswar Chapter from 2023 to 2025, becoming the first woman to lead a city or state chapter in the organization. She was also the CWW East Zone Coordinator at CREDAI from 2019 to 2023. Her leadership roles extended to her involvement with the Confederation of Indian Industry, where she was the Co-Chair at the Indian Green Building Council (IGBC) Bhubaneswar Chapter.

Sofia was also an active member of the CII Indian Women Network (IWN) Odisha and a core committee member of the ICC INWEC Odisha.

Sofia is also a trustee of the Moquim Foundation, an organization dedicated to social welfare and community service.

=== Political career ===
Sofia Firdous entered the political arena in 2024, running as the Indian National Congress candidate for the Barabati-Cuttack Assembly constituency in the Odisha Legislative Assembly elections. She won, defeating Purna Chandra Mahapatra of the Bharatiya Janata Party by a margin of 8,001 votes. Carrying forward her father’s legacy, she retained her father Mohammed Moquim’s seat, as he had served as the MLA for Barabati-Cuttack from 2019 to 2024. On 17 March 2026, Sofia Firdous was expelled from the Indian National Congress after defying the party whip by voting in favour of a candidate backed by the Bharatiya Janata Party in a Rajya Sabha election.

== Personal life ==
Sofia Firdous married Sheikh Mairajul Haque, an entrepreneur based in Odisha who manages business in different states of India, in 2015.

== Awards and honors ==
- Times Power Woman 2021
- Times Power Woman 2023
- Top 20 Inspirational Personalities of Odisha 2021

== See also ==
- Nandini Satpathy
