= Ahe Nila Saila =

Odia-language song (stuti) composed by Bhakta Salabega

"Ahe Neela Shaila"

Song
- Language: Odia
- Written: 17th century
- Genre: Odissi music
- Lyricist: Salabega

"Ahe Neela Shaila" (Odia: ଆହେ ନୀଳ ଶଇଳ, romanized: āhe nīḷa saiḷa, lit. 'O blue mountain') is an Odissi classical song (stuti) composed by the 17th-century saint-poet Salabega, addressing Mahaprabhu Jagannatha in Puri Dhaam.

== Music ==
The traditional composition is set to the Raga Chinta Kamodi and the Tala Jati.

It has been famously rendered by Pt Bhikari Charan Bal.

== Lyrics ==
Oh, Ahe Nila Saila (O Resident of the Blue Mountains) is a renowned Jagannath Bhajan in Odisha. It was composed by Bhakta Salabega, an Odia religious poet from the early 17th century who wrote devotional songs dedicated to Lord Jagannath. Despite being born a Muslim, his profound devotion to the Hindu deity is celebrated in folklore, which recounts how Lord Jagannath halted his Ratha Jātrā (Rath Yatra) to allow Salabega to have a darshan (glimpse) and offer his prayers.

In the song, the poet extols Lord Jagannath's magnanimity in aiding his devotees. He vividly depicts various situations where individuals in distress are rescued by the supreme lord. Furthermore, he beseeches the deity to eradicate all cardinal sins from his mind and relieve him from suffering. Below, the song is transcribed in both Odia and English.

ଆହେ ନୀଳ ଶଇଳ ପ୍ରବଳ ମତ୍ତ ବାରଣ
ମୋ ଆରତ ନଳିନୀ ବନକୁ କର ଦଳନ । ଘୋଷା ।
ଗଜରାଜ ଚିନ୍ତା କଲା ଥାଇ ଘୋର ଜଳେଣ
ଚକ୍ର ପେଷି ନକ୍ର ନାଶି ଉଦ୍ଧାରିଲ ଆପଣ । ୧ ।
ଘୋର ବନେ ମୃଗୁଣୀକି ପଡ଼ିଥିଲା କଷଣ
କେଡ଼େ ବଡ଼ ବିପତ୍ତିରୁ ରକ୍ଷାକଲ ଆପଣ । ୨ ।
କୁରୁସଭା ତଳେ ଶୁଣି ଦ୍ରୌପଦୀର ଜଣାଣ
କୋଟି ବସ୍ତ୍ର ଦେଇ ହେଳେ ଲଜ୍ଜା କଲ ବାରଣ । ୩ ।
ରାବଣର ଭାଇ ବିଭୀଷଣ ଗଲା ଶରଣ
ଶରଣ ସମ୍ଭାଳି ତାଙ୍କୁ ଲଙ୍କେ କଲ ରାଜନ । ୪ ।
ପ୍ରହଲ୍ଲାଦ ପିତା ସେ ଯେ ବଡ଼ ଦୁଷ୍ଟ ଦାରୁଣ
ସ୍ତମ୍ଭରୁ ବାହାରି ତାକୁ ବିଦାରିଲ ତକ୍ଷଣ । ୫ ।
କହେ ସାଲବେଗ ହୀନ ଜାତିରେ ମୁଁ ଯବନ
ଶ୍ରୀରଙ୍ଗା ଚରଣ ତଳେ କରୁଅଛି ଜଣାଣ । ୬ ।

āhe nīḷa saiḷa prabaḷa matta bārana
mo arata naḷinī banaku kara daḷana / ghosa/
gajarāja chintā kalā thāi ghora jaḷeṇa
chakra pesi nakra nāsi uddhārila āpaṇa /1/
ghora bane mruguṇi-ki paḍithila kasaṇa
keḍe baḍa bipatti-ru rakhyā kala āpaṇa /2/
kuru-sabhā tale suni dropadi-ra jaṇāṇa
koti bastra dei hele lajjā kala bāraṇa /3/
rābaṇa-ra bhāi bibhīsana gala saraṇa
saraṇa sambhāḷi tānku lanke kala rājana /4/
prahallāda pitā se je baḍa dusta dāruṇa
stambha-ru bāhāri tāku bidārila takhyaṇa /5/
kahe sālabega hina jāti-re mun jabana
srirangā charaṇa tale karu-achi jaṇāṇa /6/

O o resident of the green mountains
I plead you to vanquish the lotus-forest of my agonies. /refrain/
When elephant king invoked you in deep waters
you sent the chakra and saved him from the crocodile. /1/
Deep in the forest the doe was suffering,
you saved her from the immense predicament. /2/
In the Kuru court Draupadi called you,
you sent her infinite cloth and saved her dignity. /3/
Ravana's brother Vibhishana sought your shelter
You not only sheltered him but made him the king of Lanka. /4/
Prahallada's father was a cruel, evil man
You emerged from the pillar and tore him apart. /5/
Says Salabega, I am a Yavana (=non-Hindu) by birth
Listen to my janāna (=message) under your lotus feet. /6/
