= Sailo Jharapada =

Coordinates: 20.502402°N 86.168963°E

Sailo Jharapada is a small village in Odisha, India, situated beside the river Devi (Kathajodi), a branch of the river Mahanadi. It is in the Kantapada block of Cuttack district. The village's name is Jharapada, while Sailo is the name of the pragana used as a prefix to distinguish it from other places with same name. Its PIN code is 754003. Besides the river Devi, Kakatapur Branch canal also flows on the eastern side of the village by the side of the river. The village is under Niali Assembly Constituency under Jagatsinghpur parliamentary constituency.

== Freedom Fighters ==
Multiple residents participated in India's independence movement.

1. Ramachandra Mohapatra
2. Sarbani Narayan Sengupta
3. Baishnaba Charan Senapati
4. Shyamananda Mohapatra
5. Padmacharan Mohapatra

=== From nearby villages ===
1. Niranjan Mohapatra - Kheras
2. Bibhuti bhusan Acharya – Brahman Sailo
3. Ishwar Chandra Pradhan – Bada Waubarai
4. Bauribandhu Patra – Majurai
5. Ghanashyam Pati – Govindpur
6. Muralidhar Kanungo – Uttaran
7. Haramani Kanungo – Uttaran
8. Kanduri Charan Mallik – Alingi
9. Bijayram Chaoudhury – Patasundarpur.
10. Balaram Choudhury – Patasundarpur
11. Gangadhar Mishra-Bhodal

== Religion ==
The only and major religion of this village is Hinduism. This village has signs of various rulers of Odisha, who have followed Vishnu, Shiva, Shakti. Accordingly, the village has various temples built in different centuries.

=== Temples ===
1. Bhogeshwar: This is the oldest temple in the village. The temple was initially constructed in 18th century.
2. Laxmi Narayan: New idol installed in May 2013.
3. Jagannath: This temple was built by Rabi Narayan Mohapatra. He also started Rathayatra in 2015 with the co-operation of the devotees.
4. Budhi Thakurani
5. Akhandalamani
6. Hanuman

=== Festivals ===
Dasahara is a major festival. Other festivals include Ganesh Chaturthi, Kali Puja, and Kartika Puja. Jagannath rathayatra was held for the first time in July 2015.

== Education ==
=== Schools ===
The village has had educational institutions for years; a primary school started operation in 1904. In 1941 ME School was established. The high school was established in 1956.

=== Bank ===
Canara Bank has opened a branch in the village.
