= Samir Dey =

Indian politician (1957–2024)

Minister of Higher Education Government of Odisha
- In office 18 May 2004 – 9 February 2009
- Chief Minister: Naveen Patnaik
- Preceded by: Bimbadhar Kuanr
- Succeeded by: Naveen Patnaik

Minister of Urban Development Government of Odisha
- In office 6 March 2000 – 16 May 2004
- Chief Minister: Naveen Patnaik
- Preceded by: Bhupinder Singh
- Succeeded by: Kanak Vardhan Singh Deo

Member of Odisha Legislative Assembly
- In office 1995–2009
- Preceded by: Sayed Mustafiz Ahmed
- Succeeded by: Debashish Samantaray
- Constituency: Cuttack City

Personal details
- Born: 10 January 1957 Punanga, Jagatsinghpur
- Died: 18 November 2024 (aged 67) Cuttack, Odisha, India
- Party: Bharatiya Janata Party
- Spouse: Dipika Dutta Ray
- Children: 1 daughter
- Parent: Atul Prasad Dey (father)
- Education: Master of Arts; Bachelor of Laws
- Profession: Advocate, Politician

Samir Prasad Dey (10 January 1957 – 18 November 2024) was an Indian politician from the Bharatiya Janata Party, Odisha who had served as minister of Higher Education in Naveen Patnaik cabinet from 2004 to 2009. He had earlier served as the Minister of Urban Development in First Naveen Patnaik ministry from 2000 to 2004. He had represented Cuttack City thrice in a row – 1995, 2000, 2004 in the Odisha Legislative Assembly. Dey died from a kidney infection on 18 November 2024, at the age of 67.
