= Odisha Rural Housing & Development Corporation =

State-owned corporation in Odisha, India

- Type: Government
- Industry: Rural Housing & Development
- Founded: 1994
- Headquarters: 3rd Floor, Ashoka Market Building, Station Square,, Bhubaneswar, Odisha, India
- Number of locations: Bhubaneswar, Cuttack, Ganjam
- Area served: Odisha
- Key people: Dr. Arun Kumar Panda; IAS, Chairman
- Website: www.orhdc.in

The Odisha Rural Housing & Development Corporation or ORHDC, was established on 19 August 1994 as a Public Sector Undertaking of Government of Odisha. Odisha Rural Housing & Development Corporation (ORHDC) acquired a certificate for Commencement of Business from Registrar of Companies, Orissa, on 23 September 1994.

Odisha Rural Housing & Development Corporation's main principal was financing, promoting, developing rural housing, related activities and act as a coordinator with the objective of upgradation and building cost effective houses with the technology developed in the Building Centres.

== Schemes ==
- Kalinga Kutir Scheme
- Credit Linked Housing Scheme
- Individual Housing Loan Scheme
- Corporate Housing Loan Scheme
- Project Finance Scheme
- Building Centre Scheme
