= Mohammed Moquim =

Indian politician (born 1965)

Member of Odisha Legislative Assembly
- In office 23 May 2019 – 04 jun 2024
- Preceded by: Debashish Samantaray
- Succeeded by: Sofia Firdous
- Constituency: Barabati-Cuttack

Personal details
- Born: 3 July 1965 (age 61)
- Party: INC
- Spouse: Firdousia Bano
- Parent: Mohamed Nayeem (father)
- Education: Orissa Engineering College, Bhubaneswar
- Profession: Politician

Mohammed Moquim (born 3 July 1965) is an Indian politician expelled from INC. He was a member of the Odisha Legislative Assembly from Barabati-Cuttack. However later the Orissa High Court annulled the election of Congress MLA Mohammed Moquim from the Cuttack-Barabati Assembly constituency. Oweing to multiple fraud cases and some criminal convictions, he was disqualified to content elections in 2024.

== Personal life ==
Moquim is from Lalbag, Cuttack district. His father's name is Mohammed Nayeem. He is married to Firdousia Bano and has 2 daughters namely Sofia Firdous and Nayeema Tazeen. He passed BE From Orissa Engineering College in 1990. He owns Metro Group which is intoConstruction and Real estate business in Odisha.

== Career ==
He contested 2019 Odisha Legislative Assembly election from Barabati-Cuttack Vidhan Sabha and won the seat on 23 May 2019.

== Controversies ==
In 2024, Supreme Court of India convicted him in Odisha Rural Housing & Development Corporation loan fraud case and thus making him ineligible to contest in 2024 Odisha Legislative Assembly election.
