= Debashish Samantaray =

Indian politician

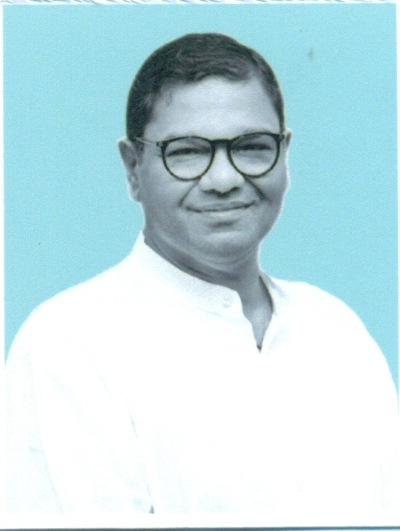

Member of Parliament, Rajya Sabha
- Incumbent
- Assumed office 4 April 2024
- Constituency: Odisha

Member of Odisha Legislative Assembly
- In office 19 May 2009 – 5 February 2019
- Preceded by: Constituency Established
- Succeeded by: Mohammed Moquim
- Constituency: Barabati-Cuttack
- In office 2000–2004
- Preceded by: Basant Kumar Biswal
- Succeeded by: Chiranjib Biswal
- Constituency: Tirtol

Personal details
- Born: 11 February 1960 (age 66) Cuttack, Odisha, India
- Party: Bharatiya Janata Party (2026–present)
- Other political affiliations: Biju Janata Dal(till 2026)
- Parent: Nityananda Samntaray (father)

Debashish Samantaray is an Indian politician. He is a Member of Parliament, representing Odisha in the Rajya Sabha the upper house of India's Parliament as a member of the Bharatiya Janata Party.
