= Kathajodi River =

Coordinates: 20.462445°N 85.832211°E

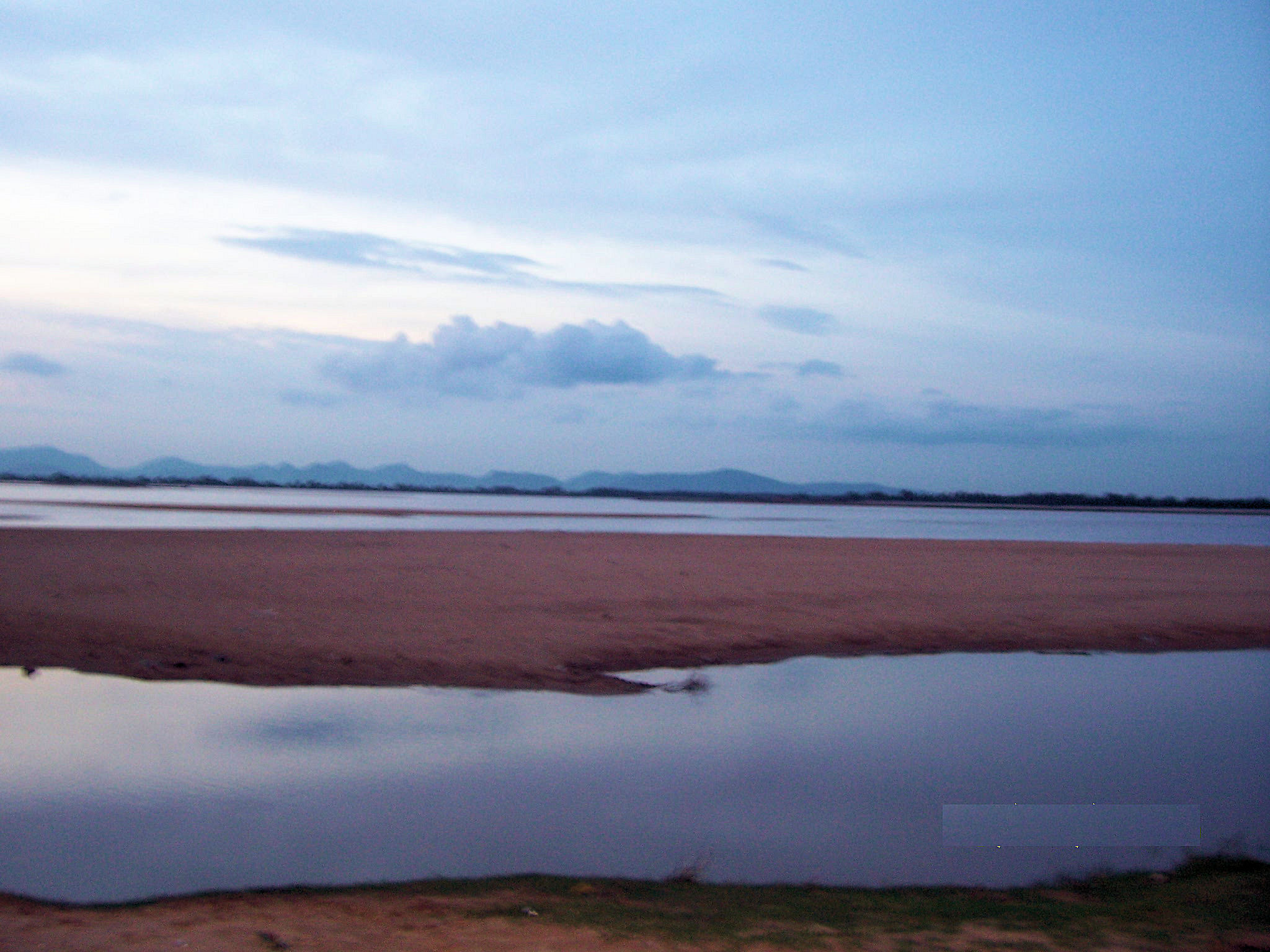
- Kathjodi River
- Etymology: It can be passed through a wood bridge in ancient time.

Location
- Country: India
- State: Odisha
- District: Cuttack District
- Cities: Cuttack

Physical characteristics
- Length: 8.69 km (5.40 mi)

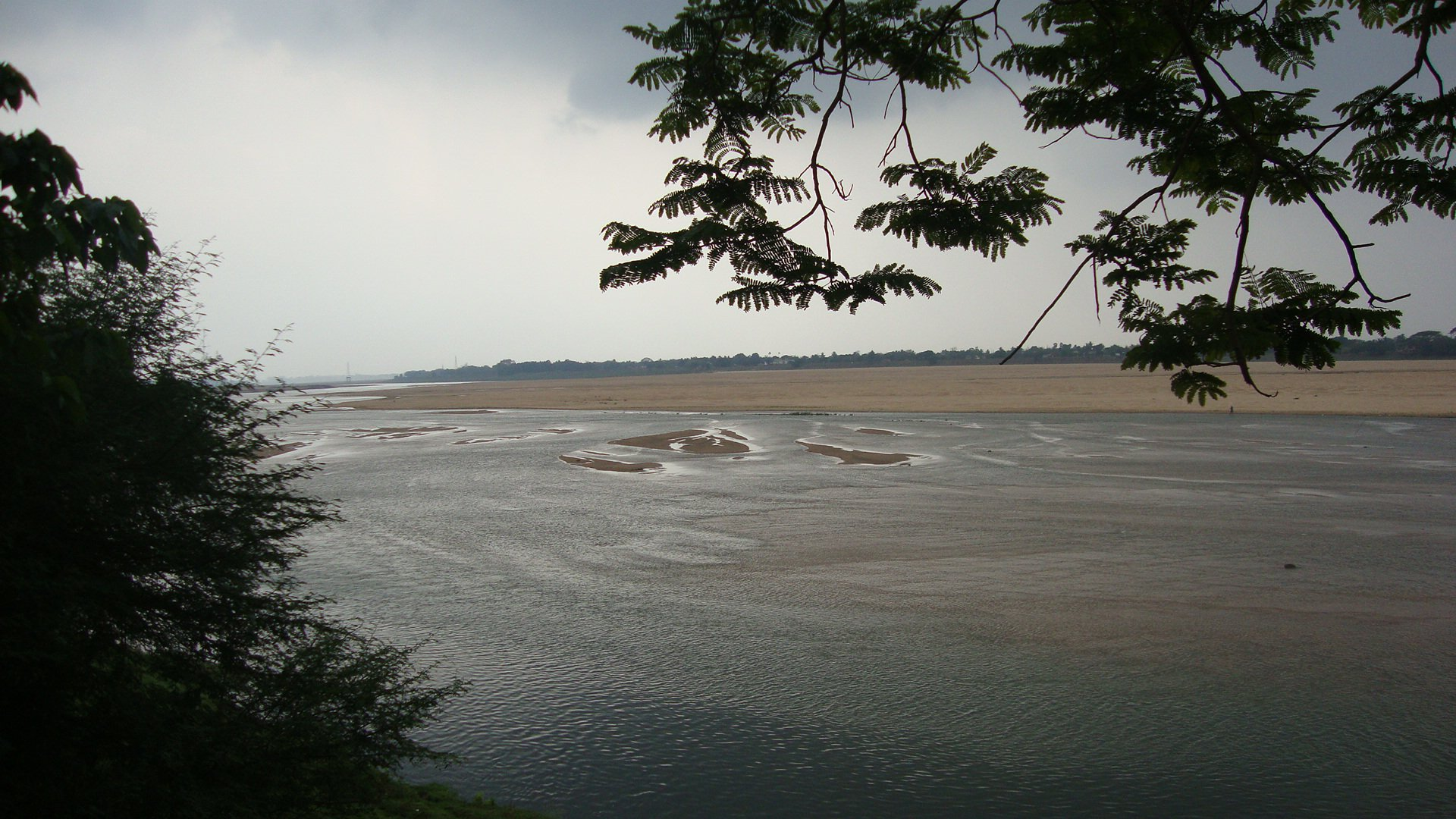
Kathajodi River at Routrapur 42 Mouza

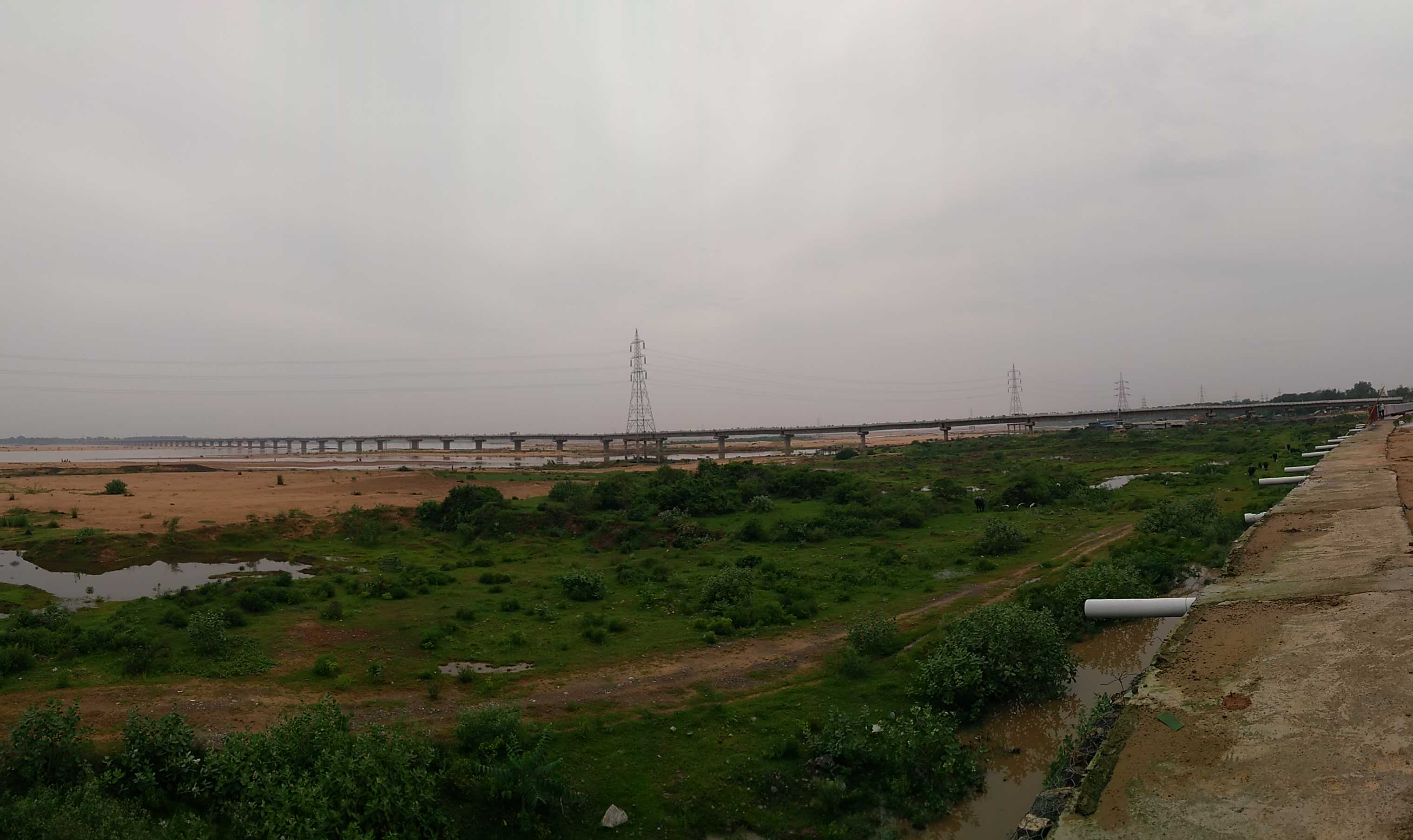
The second bridge connecting the twin cities of Cuttack and Bhubaneswar is the longest in the state at 2.88 km and will reduce the distance between the cities by almost 12 km.

Kathajodi River is an arm of the Mahanadi River in Odisha, India. It branches off at Naraj, then immediately is bifurcated. The southern branch, known as Kuakhai, which means Crow's pool, flows into the Puri district. Its mouth is closed by a bar, so that little water flows into it except at flood times.

A little further down from Cuttack the Kathajodi is bifurcated. The right branch is the Sidhua and the left branch the Khatajodi. After flowing divided for 17 km the Khatajodi and Sidhua merge. The merger area is known as Odisha famous Dalei Ghai. The Kathajodi and the Sidhua create an island known as 42 Mouza. it is about 2 km from Cuttack town. Again the Kathajodi is bifurcated at Gobindpur; the right branch is known as the Devi and the left branch as the Biluakhai. Flowing in the northerly direction, the river Kathajodi again divides into the Alaka and Kathajodi proper, which have been cut off at their head by the Devi left embankment. The water originally carried by them has been diverted into the Devi. The river Kathajodi is said to have been originally a comparatively small stream. Its name implies that it could at one time be crossed by a plank of wood known as katha in Odia. During the last century the volume of water passing down its channel increased considerably and the head of the river became too large to carry off the enormous volume of water poured into it by Mahanadi. A weir and training embankments were, therefore constructed at Naraj between 1860 and 1865, in order to regulate the flow and direct some of the water to the Mahanadi channels.

During rains, the river and its branches carry great volume of water in them and at the time of high floods they overflow their banks. To safeguard people from the ravages of flood, embankments have been erected on their banks where necessary. Around Naraj Bridge, which is approximately 10 kilometres (6 mi) from Cuttack city there are the following villages: Naraja Marthapur (local railway station), Godi Sahi, Sandhapur, Bidyadharapur, Nua Sahi and Ratagarh. All these villages are rich in ancient heritage. The people of these villages cultivate paddy and vegetables.

Some of the villages by the side of the Kathajodi River include Sailo Jharapada, Raghunathpur, Matagajapur, and Mahura. The famous Hansanath Temple dedicated to Lord Shiva is situated near Kathajodi River near Paramahansa famous for Jagar Yatra during Maha Shivaratri.
