= Barabati-Cuttack Assembly constituency =

Constituency of the Odisha legislative assembly in India

Coordinates: 20.48°N 85.87°E

Barabati-Cuttack
- Constituency No. 90 for the Odisha Legislative Assembly

Constituency details
- Country: India
- Region: East India
- State: Odisha
- Division: Central Division
- District: Cuttack
- Lok Sabha constituency: Cuttack
- Established: 2009
- Total electors: 2,44,574 (Note: as on 2024) (Note: as data published by election commission)
- Reservation: None

Member of Legislative Assembly
- 17th Odisha Legislative Assembly
- Incumbent Sofia Firdous
- Party: Independent
- Elected year: 2024

Barabati-Cuttack is a Vidhan Sabha constituency of Cuttack district, Odisha, India.

This constituency includes 25 wards of Cuttack.

The constituency was formed in 2008 Delimitation after subsuming Kissannagar Assembly Constituency and went for polls in 2009 election.

== Elected members ==
Vote share of winning candidates
2024	37.86%
2019	37.57%
2014	45.8%
2009	53.61%

Since its formation in 2009, 4 elections were held till date.

List of members elected from Barabati-Cuttack constituency are:

Year	Member	Party
2024	Sofia Firdous	Indian National Congress
2019	Mohammed Moquim	Indian National Congress
2014	Debashish Samantaray	Biju Janata Dal
2009	Debashish Samantaray	Biju Janata Dal
Before 2009 : See Kissannagar

== Election results ==
=== 2024 ===
Voting were held on 25 May 2024 in 3rd phase of Odisha Assembly Election & 6th phase of Indian General Election. Counting of votes was on 4 June 2024. In 2024 election, Indian National Congress candidate Sofia Firdous defeated Bharatiya Janata Party candidate Purna Chandra Mahapatra by a margin of 8,001 votes.

2024 Odisha Vidhan Sabha Election, Barabati-Cuttack
Party	Candidate	Votes	%	±%
INC	Sofia Firdous	53,339	37.86	▲0.29
BJP	Purnachandra Mohapatra	45,338	32.18	▲6.88
BJD	Prakash Behera	40,035	28.42	▼6.29
NOTA	None of the above	585	0.42	▼0.55
Majority		8,001	5.68	
Turnout		1,40,887	57.61	
INC hold				

=== 2019 ===
In 2019 election, Indian National Congress candidate Mohammed Moquim defeated Biju Janata Dal candidate Debashish Samantaray by a margin of 3,827 votes.

2019 Vidhan Sabha Election, Barabati-Cuttack
Party	Candidate	Votes	%	±%
INC	Mohammed Moquim	50,244	37.57	
BJD	Debashish Samantaray	48,101	34.71	
BJP	Samir Dey	33,825	25.30	
NOTA	None of the above	1,298	0.97	
Majority		3,827	2.86	
Turnout		1,33,718	56.71	
INC gain from BJD				

=== 2014 ===
In 2014 election, Biju Janata Dal candidate Debashish Samantaray defeated Indian National Congress candidate Mohammed Moquim by a margin of 14,289 votes.

2014 Vidhan Sabha Election, Barabati-Cuttack
Party	Candidate	Votes	%	±%
BJD	Debashish Samantaray	57,663	45.8	−
INC	Mohammed Moquim	43,335	34.44	−
BJP	Pradeep Swain	20,552	16.33	−
NOTA	None of the above	1,238	0.98	−
Majority		14,289	11.36	
Turnout		1,25,824	59.85	
BJD hold				

=== 2009 ===
In 2009 election, Biju Janata Dal candidate Debashish Samantaray defeated Indian National Congress candidate Suresh Mohapatra by a margin of 24,485 votes.

2009 Vidhan Sabha Election, Barabati-Cuttack
Party	Candidate	Votes	%	±%
BJD	Debashish Samantaray	52,097	53.61	−
INC	Suresh Mohapatra	27,612	28.41	−
BJP	Samir Dey	15,131	15.57	−
Majority		24,485	25.19 (Note: %of total valid votes)	−
Turnout		97,187	50.55	−
Registered electors		1,92,277		
BJD win (new seat)				
