= Tarakote Raj =

Former Princely State in India

Shergarh Sarkaar ସେରଗଡ ସରକାର شیر گڑھ سرکار
- Princely State of Mughal India
- 1632–1947
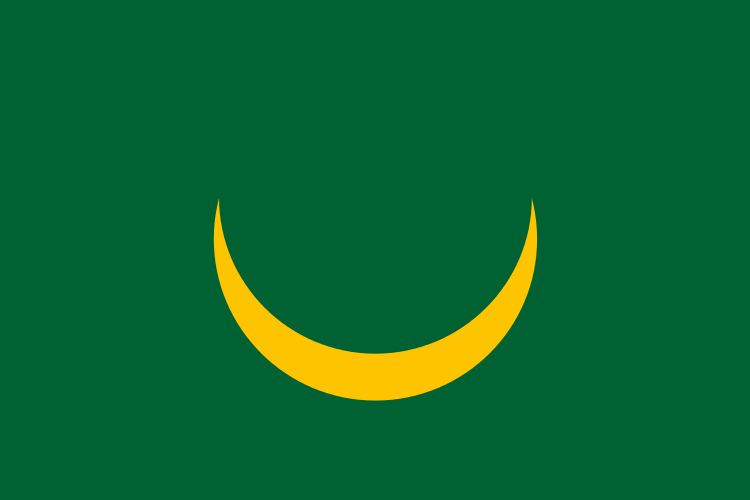
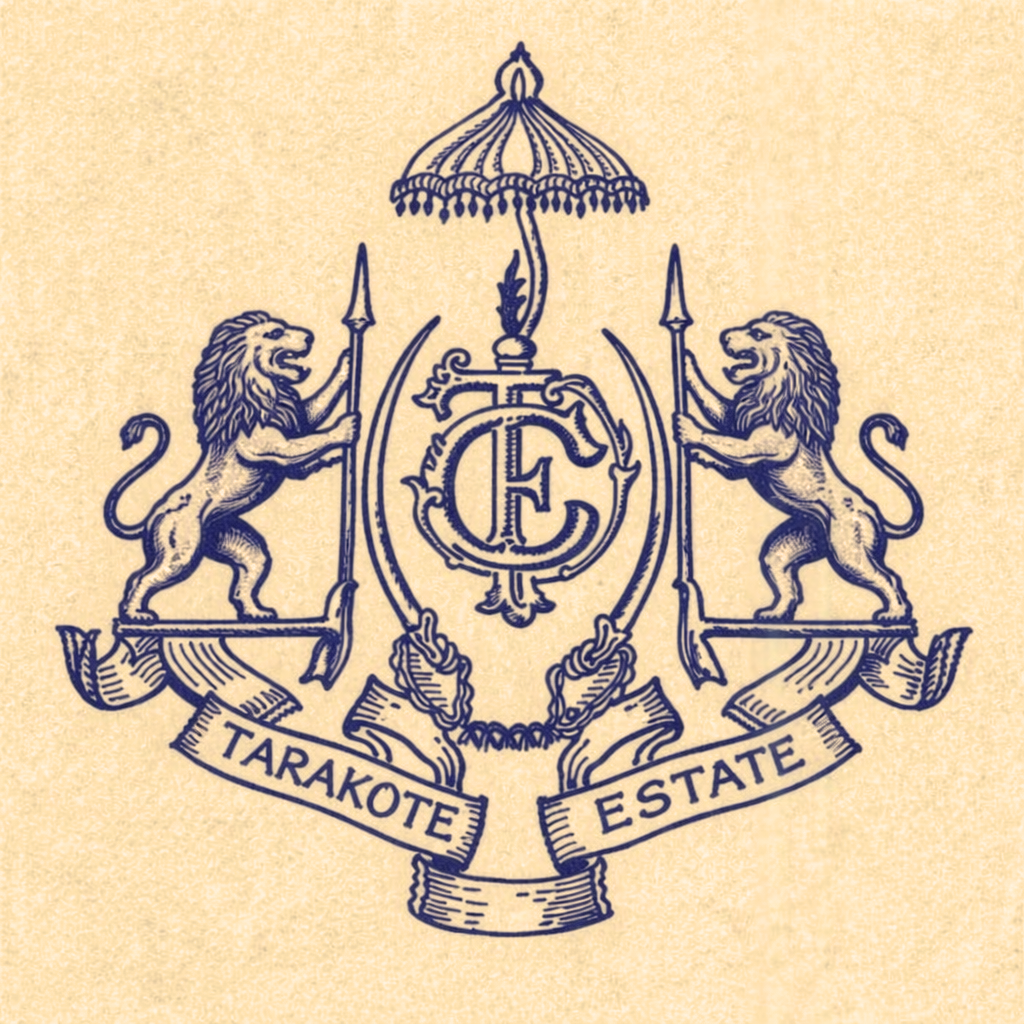
- Flag Coat of arms
- Capital: Tarakote
- Area
  - 1692: 536 km^{2} (207 sq mi)
- Historical era: 17th century
  - Established as a Mughal Sarkar: 1632
  - Became a Qilazat Estate of British India: 1810
  - Became a part of Union of India: 1947
Preceded by
| Mughal Empire |
Succeeded by
| Maratha Empire |
| East India Company |
| British Empire |
- Today part of: Odisha, India

Tarakote formerly Shergarh-Tarakote Estate was a quasi princely rump state in Korei, Odisha which was established under the Mughal Empire as a Sarakaar and overtime evolved into an intermediary princely estate during the subsequent Maratha and the British rule. Its capital was at Tarakote, in the western part of the present day Korei block.

The state was bounded in the north by Baitarani River, Labanga hill in the west, Madala hill in the east and by the Kharasrota River in the south.

== History ==
=== Mughal period ===
During the 1630s, the Mughal rule in Odisha was de-stabilized due to the rebellions of the Afghans and the local gadjat kings. Under the order of Emperor Shahjahan himself, a military general of Nadia named Syed Luftullah Ali Mirza was sent to the Mughal cantonment at Jajanagar (established by Man Singh) to aid the then Mughal Subedar of Odisha, Shehzada Shah Shuja (the son of Emperor Shahab-ud-din Muhammad Khurram Shahjahan).

Lutfullah had a brother named Syed Karimullah Ali Mirza, who was a Qazi (jurist) by profession, who came to Odisha along with his brother. Having successfully crushed the local rebellions, both the brothers returned to the Jajpur cantonment. It was during this time that the neighbouring tribal kingdom of Sabaragada refused to submit their territories and accept the Mughal suzerainty, they also killed the Safeer (Rajdoot, messenger of the Subedaar). Lutfullah marched towards Sabaragada (lying in the northwest part of today's Jajpur district), with his army.

Sabaragada was ruled by the Sabara tribe, and hence derived its name from them, Sabara (the tribe) and gada (meaning fort), literally translating to the "Fort of the Sabaras." Lutfullah Ali Mirza surrounded the fort from all sides and eventually seized it. Having no other option, the Sabara chieftain submitted to Lutfullah Ali Mirza and accepted Mughal suzerainty, acknowledging the overlordship of the King-Emperor. Luftullah then changed the name of Sabaragada to Shergarh, symbolising the Mughal imperialism and dominance in the area. However, earlier Mughal administrative records complicate this narrative. The Ain‑i‑Akbari, compiled by Abul Fazl during the reign of Akbar between 1589 and 1596, already lists "Shergarh" as one of the 21 mahal forts under the Cuttack Sarkar. According to this record, Shergarh maintained a military contingent of 20 cavalry and 200 infantry. The fort was governed by a Brahmin ruler who paid an annual revenue of 1,408,580 dams to the Mughal administration, indicating its integration into the imperial fiscal and military framework well before Lutfullah's campaign. The absence of substantial intermediate records between the late 16th century and 1632 leaves this transitional phase insufficiently documented, contributing to ongoing historiographical uncertainty regarding the fort's political and administrative evolution.

However to honor the tribal leader, Lutfullah built a new fort over the ruins of Sabaragada fort and named it after him Bangar-e-kot (kot, in Persian meaning fort) [present day : Bangarkote].

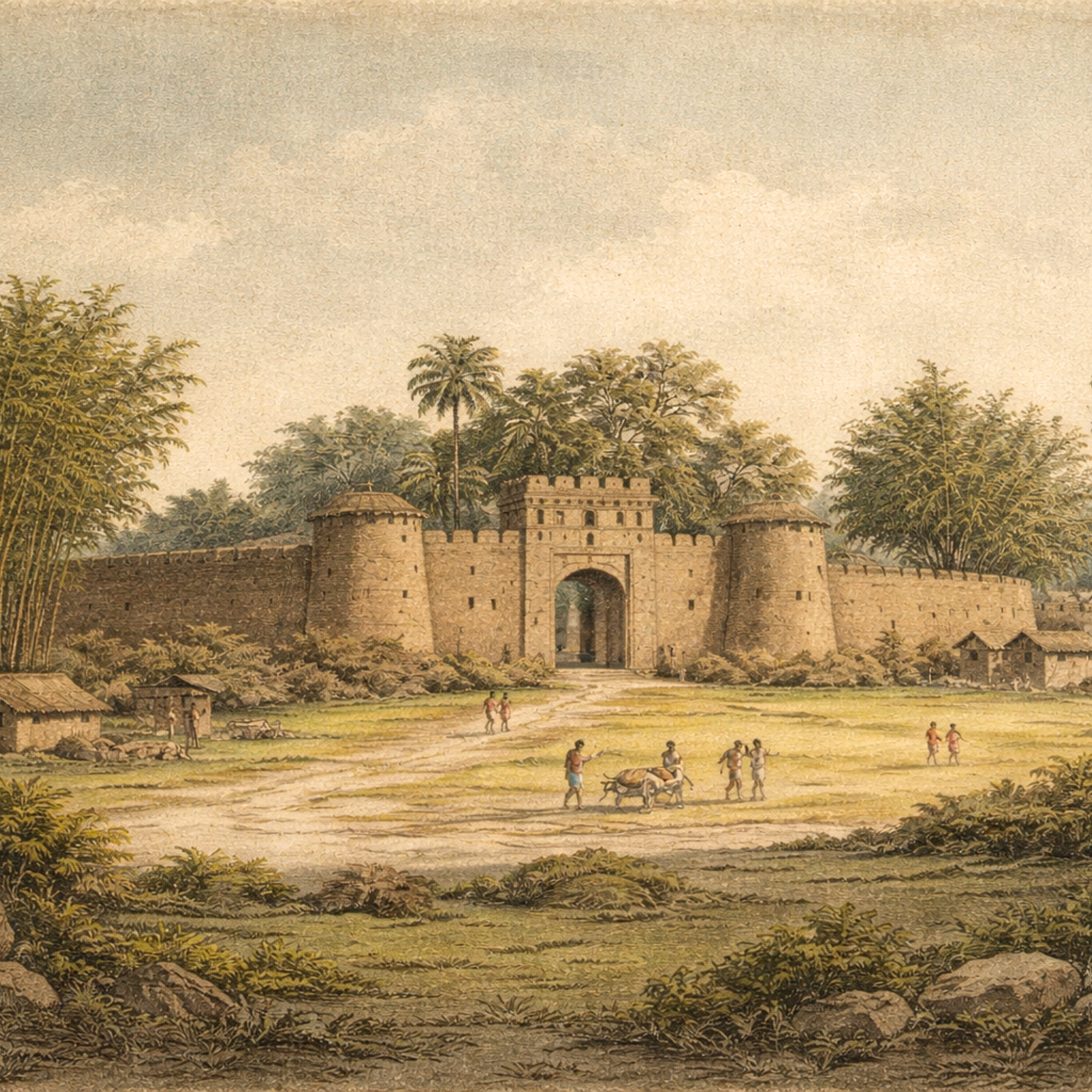
The Mud-fort of Shergarh-Tarakote in 19th Century

Lutfullah then built four other forts in Shergarh, namely Uttarkot (towards the north of Shergarh), Paschimkot (present day: Pacchikote, towards the west of Shergarh), Purabkot (towards the east of Shergarh) and finally Tarakote (at the centre of Shergarh). During the reign of Shahjahan, Orissa was reorganised into 12 Sarkars and 276 Mahals in places of 3 Sarkars and 62 original Parganas. This reorganisation took place in 1692 A.D., after Orissa being separated from Bengal constituted a separate Subah under the Imperial Mughal Empire. Luftullah's newly made Shergarh formed a new Sarkar/Dandapada and gained recognition of the Emperor as Choti Jajpur Sarkar or Shergarh Sarkar. It had 5 Mahals under it, namely Purbakot, Uttarkot, Tarakote, Pacchikote and Bangarkote. A total sum of Rs 1, 27, 208 was assessed from these five Mahals.

In that very year, Lutfullah was duly recognized as the Shiqdaar-e-Sarkaar and later as the ruler of Shergarh, Raja Miyan (under the suzerainty of the Emperor) by the newly made Subedar of Odisha, Mutaqad Khan Mirza Makki. Lutfullah hence assumed the title of Meherbaan Raja Miyan and made Tarakote his capital and appointed his brother Syed Karimullah Ali Mirza as the Shahi Qazi of Shergarh.

=== Under Nawabs of Bengal ===
The rulers of Shergarh became more autonomous, when the Mughal rule in Odisha weakened and Odisha fell under the control of the Nawabs of Bengal. They successfully resisted many attacks of the Bargis during the Maratha invasions of Bengal and Orissa.

Invasion of Kantajharigarh

The Invasion of Kantajharigarh was a military attack on Tarakote Palace that is believed to have occurred around 1726. The assault was carried out by the Raja of Kantajharigarh during the absence of the ruling monarch of Tarakote.

According to regional historical accounts and oral traditions, Raja Miyan of Tarakote, along with members of the royal family, had travelled to Bhadrak to attend an Urs, a religious commemoration held at a Sufi shrine. During this period, when the royal household and a portion of the court were away from the capital, the Raja of Kantajharigarh launched an attack on the Tarakote palace complex. The invasion is believed to have been influenced by ongoing rivalries between neighbouring estates and ruling houses in the region during the early eighteenth century.

Despite the sudden nature of the attack, the soldiers and palace guards of Tarakote mounted a determined defence. Accounts describe the defenders as fighting valiantly in an effort to protect the palace and maintain control of the estate. Their resistance reportedly slowed the advance of the attacking forces and prevented the immediate capture of the palace. News of the invasion eventually reached Raja Miyan of Tarakote, who returned from Bhadrak with loyal retainers and supporters. His return strengthened the defence of the estate and ultimately forced the invading forces to withdraw.

Local oral traditions also recount the bravery of Malati Rajak, the palace dhobin (washerwoman) during the conflict. According to these accounts, she joined the defenders and fought valiantly against the invading forces. During the struggle she was captured by the attackers and taken away to Kantajharigarh. Tradition holds that she later narrowly escaped from captivity and returned, her actions remembered in local memory as an example of courage and loyalty in the defence of Tarakote.

During the Battle of Phulwari in 1741, Alivardi Khan marched from Midnapore through Jalasore, crossing the Subarnarekha River and encamped at Ramachandrapur. Although his forces were positioned close to the camp of Lutfullah Tabrizi, Alivardi found himself unable to launch an attack. A severe shortage of provisions had crippled his army, caused primarily by the failure of the Midnapore zamindars to supply him. Resistance to Alivardi's advance had further consolidated when Syed Ruknuddin Ali, the Raja of Tarakote openly supported Lutfullah Tabrizi by remaining loyal to Orissa and played a decisive role in severing supply lines at Ramachandrapur. This coordinated disruption of provisions ultimately halted Alivardi's forward march forcing him to entrench his forces through the monsoon and renew the campaign once conditions improved.

=== Under Maratha rule ===
However, after Odisha was handed over to the Marathas by Alivardi Khan in 1751, Shergarh's territories got eroded away gradually. By the second half of the eighteenth century, more than half of Shergarh had been ceded to the Marathas. In 1767 the Marathas occupied Pacchikote fort and installed a new ruler in the domain, confining the rulers of Shergarh to their capital at Tarakote. Shergarh then was only left with Bansipur, Gourpur, Icchapur, Jaintria, Jugala, Jugalakana, Khosalpur, Kundapur, Nayahat Patna, Sahaspur, Talia, Tulasipur, Bangarkote, Barundai, Biruanapada, Khajuribindha, Khajurinaula, Santsahi, Tarapada, Uttarakhajira, Uttarkot, Godarapal, Kadamba Paramanandpur and Pataranga.

=== Under British rule ===
After the British occupation of Odisha on 17 December 1803, Tarakote along with the other subsidiary principalities in Odisha fell under the East India Company's rule. Shergarh was recognised as a British protectorate in 1807 following the defeat of the Maratha Empire in the area. In 1810, Permanent Settlement was effected by Col. Harcourt, Mr. Melville and the Board of Commissioners with Raja Syed Nuruddin Ali and Tarakote was enlisted as a Qilazat Estate.

"Copy of a kabulyat executed by Syed Nuruddin Ali Khan, Raja, Killa Tarakote.

I, Syed Nuruddin Ali Khan, Raja, Killa Tarakote, in the province of Orissa, do hereby execute this kabulyat out of my full and free consent, that having been appointed to hold the service of the hereditary zamindar in the killa by Government, I will collect the rents, according to former rates, agreeably to the laws of the Government.

That I will pay the annual revenue due to Government in instalments specified below, without any excuse. That I will keep the rayats prosperous and contented, and exert myself to improve the lands so that they will bring forth more crops than they did before. That I shall not allow an inch of cultivable land to fall waste. That I will never allow the growing of inferior crops in salt soil lands. That I will not be prodigal in my expenses, nor allow my rayats to be so. That I will never grant any land in gift or jagir without a sanad of the Government. That I will keep a watchful eye over the boundaries of my zamindari. That I will vigilantly watch the roads, the ghats and rivers, and prevent the manufacture in my estate. That there shall never occur any thefts or murders within the same. Should any robbery occur, I will trace out the offenders and recover the property stolen and send them over to the authorities accordingly. I do hereby execute this kabulyat which will serve whenever it be required hereafter.

Jama pashkash in perpetuity, 5,000 kohans Instalments. Fagun: 1,000 Chaitra: 1,500 Bysakh: 1,500 Jeith: 1,000 Total: 5,000

Rate being 4 kohans to the rupee.."

In 1821, 23 villages of Tarakote Raj were confiscated and annexed by the British, when Raja Miyan Nuruddin Ali failed to pay the exorbitant taxes to the British.

According to Statistical Account of Bengal, Volume 18 by William Wilson Hunter (1877), Shergarha-Tarakote comprised an area of 137.70 square miles (approximately 88,127 acres). Of this total land: 33,527 acres were under cultivation 2,256 acres were classified as cultivable but not currently cultivated 52,344 acres were recorded as uncultivable land. The total land revenue assessed from Shergarha amounted to £1,926 and 14 shillings.

In 1886 Raja Syed Ekram Ali built the first girls school in Jajpur district, which is presently known as Tarakot Urdu girls Makhtab school. Later in the 1920s the largest source of revenue of Raja Syed Ekram Ali, the Kantro haat or the local bazaar of Kantore was also sold off by the British. With the abolition of the Zamindari system in India in 1956, Shergarh-Tarakote state was formally abolished.

== Rulers ==
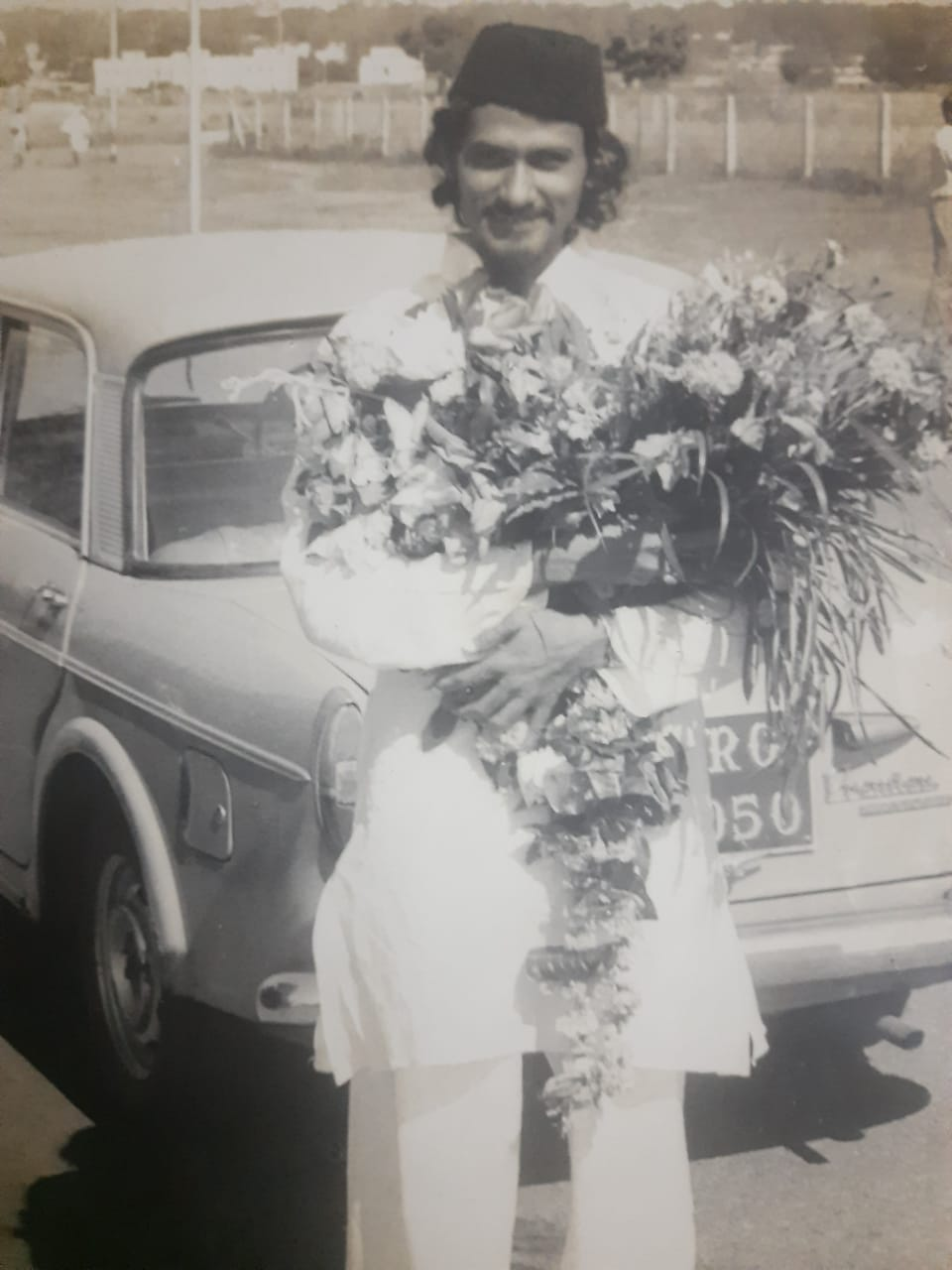
Fazal e Haq Mohammad Hussain, the 15th Raja Miyan Saheb of Tarakote Raj

The rulers of Shergarh State were Sunni Muslims who belonged to Sayyid dynasty. They claimed descent from Husayn ibn Ali and were therefore regarded as Husaynids. Until 1892, the head of the ruling family officially bore the title of Raja Miyan. When the British conquered Odisha in 1803, Tarakote and Darpangarh were the only two historical princely estates in Odisha ruled by Muslim royal families. Following the deposition of Raja Akbar Hussain of Darpangarh in 1843, Tarakote remained the sole princely estate in Odisha under a Muslim ruling dynasty.

=== Sarkaardaars of Shergarh ===
- 1632–1702 : Raja Miyan Syed Luftullah Ali Mirja
- 1703–1747 : Raja Miyan Syed Ruknuddin Ali Mirja

=== Rajas of Tarakote ===
- 1747–1750 : Raja Miyan Syed Hussain Ali Mirja
- 1750–1752: Raja Syed Ameer Ali
- 1752–1763 : Raja Syed Mansub Ali
- 1763–1788 : Raja Miyan Syed Zulfiqar Ali
- 1788–1793 : Raja Syed Ehsan Ali
- 1788–1802 : Raja Miyan Syed Harun Ali
- 1802–1804 : Raja Miyan Syed Murtaza Ali
- 1804–1869 : Raja Miyan Syed Nuruddin Ali
- 21 Jan 1869 – 11 July 1890 : Raja Syed Ekram Ali
- 1890-1892 : Musammat Noor-un Nissa Bibi Badi Begum Saheb
- 1892–1956 : Mohammed Dabiruddin (married Bibi Aleem-un-nissa, the eldest daughter of Raja Akbar Hussain of Darpangarh)

=== Titular rulers ===
- 11 March 1970 – 10 July 1999 : Mohammed Mozzamil Hussain
- 20 August 1999 – 28 January 2023 : Fazal e Haq Mohammed Hussain Rabi Gandhi
- 10 March 2023 – present : Begum Sahiba Tabasum Amin Akhtar Sultana Suhrawardiyya
