= Raja Syed Ekram Ali =

- 11th Raja Miyan of Tarakote Raj; Taajdar e Tarakote
- Reign: 21 January 1869 – 11 July 1890
- Predecessor: Raja Miyan Syed Nuruddin Ali Choudhury
- Successor: Choudhury Mohammed Dabiruddin (adopted)
- Born: 1842; Santasahi, Qila Tarakote, Tarakote State
- Died: 11 July 1890 (aged 47–48); Tarakote State
- Burial: Shahi Qabristan, Barundai, Tarakote State
- Consort: Bibi Badi Begum Saheb
- Spouse: 3 including Bibi Badi Begum Saheb
Names
- Taajdar e Tarakote Meherban Raja Miyan Syed Shamsuddin Mohammed Ekram Ali Choudhury Saheb
- House: Hussain Jahi
- Dynasty: Sayyid
- Father: Raja Syed Nuruddin Ali
- Mother: Salihaa Bibi Sahab
- Religion: Islam

Raja Syed Ekram Ali was the 11th hereditary ruler of the quasi-princely state of Tarakote in Odisha. He is known for the wide social reforms that he had brought in his state. He was a staunch advocate of female education and took concrete steps to promote formal learning for girls. In 1886, he established the very first girls’ school in Jajpur, which at the time was part of the undivided Cuttack district.

== Early life ==
Miyanzada Syed Ekram Ali was born on 21 January 1869 into the ruling family of Tarakote State to Raja Miyan Syed Nurrudin Ali. At the age of 8 he contracted small pox which took away his vision. Following his father’s death, he ascended the throne at the age of twenty-seven, becoming the 11th ruler of Tarakote State.

== Reign ==
Raja Miyan Ekram Ali suffered considerable territorial losses during his reign, as a majority of the villages under Tarakote State were transferred to British control under the provisions of the Land Revenue Settlement Act. Several of these villages were subsequently auctioned and sold to outsiders by the colonial administration. Earlier, during the reign of his great-grandfather, Raja Zulfiqar, a substantial portion of Shergarh-Tarakote had been annexed by the Marathas including the fort of Pacchikote, resulting in the formation of a separate Maratha polity in the region known as Pacchikote Raj. The newly established Raja of Pacchikote, a contemporary of Raja Ekram Ali, is recorded in local tradition to have engaged in an armed conflict with Tarakote near the Purbakot Haat in Kantore. Raja Ekram Ali is said to have personally led his forces in this confrontation and emerged victorious.

Oral accounts further suggest that the immediate cause of hostilities stemmed from an incident in which the Diwan of the Raja of Pacchikote, while transporting essential provisions back to Pacchikote Garh, inadvertently crossed into Tarakote territory. Mistaken for a dacoit by the Tarakote garrison, he was apprehended for unlawful entry. This act provoked the Raja of Pacchikote, who retaliated by attacking Tarakote. Raja Syed Ekram Ali, however, successfully defended his dominion, reportedly with the assistance of Pathan soldiers from Bhadrak. The confrontation culminated in the decisive Battle of Kantor, where Raja Ekram Ali’s forces defeated the invading army of Pacchikote.

The British authorities eventually had to intervene to pacify the two rulers, resulting in a truce agreement. According to the terms, the Raja of Pacchikote was allowed to pass through Tarakote territory to reach the railway station, but during such passages, his entourage was required to remain completely silent and make no announcements contrary to the common practices.

== Social Reforms ==
Raja Ekram Ali promoted female education, he himself was a great patron of Arabic and Odia languages. In 1880 he commissioned Jajpur's first girls school. He was successfully able to suppress the Qazis voice who was against the idea of starting a 'girls school'. In 1886, the school was constructed and opened to impart education to girls. Presently it is known as Tarakote girls' school Makhtab.
