= Salabega =

Famous Pilgrim of lord jagannath

- ସାଲବେଗ

Personal life
- Born: 1607/1608 Mughal Empire
- Died: Mughal Empire

Religious life
- Religion: Hinduism
- Denomination: Jagannath Centric Vaishnavism
- Temple: Jagannath Temple, Puri

Salabega (Odia: ସାଲବେଗ, romanized: Sālabega, 1607/1608 –?) was an Odia religious poet of India in the early 17th century who wrote Jagannatha bhajanas. He was Muslim by birth but his devotion for the Hindu God made Lord Jagannath stop his Ratha Jātrā (Rath Yatra) in Odisha for him to get darshan. His famous Bhajan 'Ahe Nila Saila' lives to this day.

== Biography ==
Salabega occupies a prominent position among the devotional poets of Odisha, who devoted his life to Jagannath. He lived in the first half of the 17th century. Nilamani Mishra, who has written a comprehensive account of the poet and his works, determines the birth of Salabega between circa AD 1607–1608. Salabega was the son of the Mughal subedar, Lalbeg. His father, on one of his military excursions, came across Dandamukundapur. There he saw a beautiful young Brahmin widow Lalita returning from her bath in a river. Salabega was their only son.

As soon as he was old enough, Salabega took up fighting in his father's campaigns. Once he was severely wounded in battle. Battling for life he accepted the advice of his mother, and chanted the holy name of Vishnu, which cured him miraculously. Feeling greatly indebted to Vishnu, he tried to learn more about Hinduism. His mother taught him about Jagannath, who is Vishnu. Amazed and thrilled he went to Puri but was refused entrance into the temple of Jagannath due to his religion of birth. Thereafter he went on foot to Vrindavan wherein he lived the life of an ascetic in the association of sadhus, reciting bhajans in honour of Krishna. After one year in Vraja (Vrindavana), he returned to Puri desiring to see the Ratha yatra festival of Jagannath, but on the way he suddenly fell ill. Feeling helpless and realising that he would not reach Puri in time to see the Ratha yatra festival, he offered prayers to Jagannath petitioning Him to wait until he arrived.

On the day of the Return Cart festival, Nandighosa, the cart of Jagannath, did not move until Salabega's arrival. The place where the cart remained stationary to give darshana to Salabega, was later used by Salabega to compose his many bhajans in honour of Jagannath. His body was cremated there after his death. The Samadhi of this great devotee is still standing on the Grand road in Puri called badadanda. In his honour, every year during the Rath Yatra (Cart Festival), the cart of Jagannath stays for a while near his Samadhi.

This poet was a great devotee of Sri Jagannath (Sri Krishna). His bhajans are still popular among the devotees of Jagannath. Salabega composed numerous devotional songs but not all of them have survived. Most of his compositions are prayers and hymns to Jagannath and Krishna. A good number of these deal with the romantic dalliance of Krishna with the gopis and Radha, while a few are inspired by the vatsalya ras, the sweet, motherly feeling Yashoda had for little Krishna.

== Work ==
His deep devotion has intensity and passion, outstanding even in the devotional literature of the Bhakti era. Although the poet was denied entry into the temple, his descriptions of the inner compound and the sanctum are among the most detailed and accurate in the devotional literature of Odisha. His song Ahe Nila Saila is one of the most famous prayers dedicated to Jagannatha. Many of the historical events of the period are recounted in his songs. The poet refers, with deep anguish, to the depredations of the marauders in their attacks on Puri and the repeated attempts to loot and desecrate the Srimandira. This frequently necessitated shifting the deities outside the main sanctum and the poet gives graphic details in the song Kene Gheni Jaucha Jagannathanku.

Salabega's songs are sung in traditional tunes based on the ragas and talas of Odissi music.

== See also ==
- List of Indian poets
- Odissi music
