= List of schools in Odisha =

Notable schools in the state of Odisha, India, include

- Capital High School, Bhubaneswar
- Chandra Sekhar Behera Zilla School, Sambalpur
- Chanashyan Hemlata Vidya Mandir, Jharsuguda
- Govt. Boys' High School, Gunupur
- Government High School, Saheed Nagar
- Gram Vikas Residential School
- Ispat English Medium School, Rourkela
- Jamia Ashraful Uloom, Mahmoodabad, Kendrapara
- Maharaja Krushna Chandra High School, Baripada
- Nigamananda Bidyapitha, Daulatabad, Choudwar
- Odisha Adarsha Vidyalaya, Jayantigiri, Jeypore
- Puri Zilla School, Puri
- Ravenshaw Collegiate School, Cuttack
- SAI International School
- Sainik School, Bhubaneswar
- Sayeed Seminary, Cuttack
- Secondary Board High School, Cuttack
- Sri Aurobindo Institute of Higher Studies & Research, Cuttack
- St. Mary's Higher Secondary School, Jharsuguda
- St. Mary's School, Jajpur Road
- Stewart School, Cuttack
