= Odisha Adarsha Vidyalaya, Jayantigiri =

School in Jeypore, India

Odisha Adarsha Vidyalaya, Jayantigiri, Jeypore
- ଓଡିଶା ଆଦର୍ଶ ବିଦ୍ୟାଳୟ, ଜୟନ୍ତୀଗିରି, ଜୟପୁର
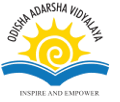

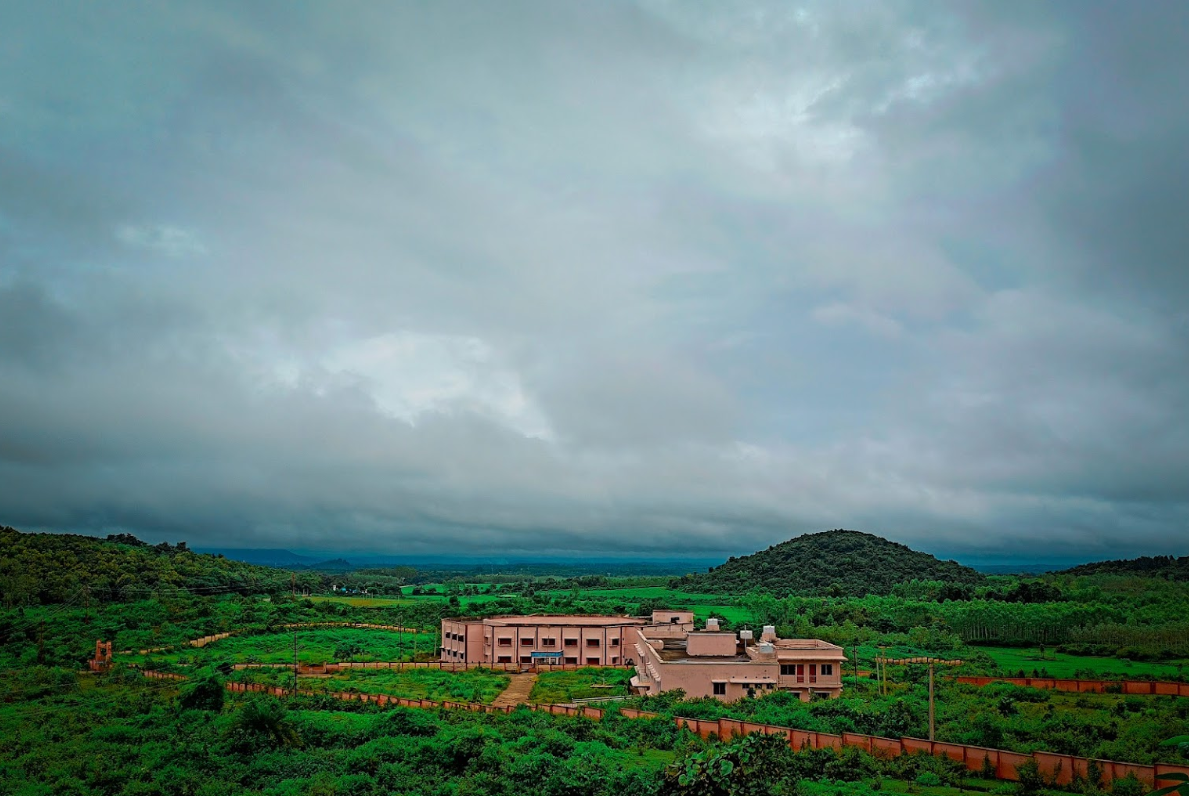

Location
- Jayantigiri, Jeypore; Jayantigiri; Jeypore, Odisha, 757056; India; 19.024004557688798°N 82.5513637820184°E ,

Information
- School type: Public (State Government)
- Motto: Inspire and Empower ("ଅନୁପ୍ରେରଣ ଏବଂ ସଶକ୍ତିକରଣ")
- Established: 2016
- Founder: Government of Odisha
- Sister school: All Odisha Adarsha Vidyalayas across Odisha
- School board: Central Board of Secondary Education(CBSE)
- Authority: Odisha Adarsha Vidyalaya Sangathan, Department of School and Mass education (Odisha)
- School number: 17143
- Principal: Rohitaswa Sethy
- Staff: 16
- Grades: 6th - 12th
- Enrollment: 438
- Language: English, and Odia
- Classrooms: 14
- Campuses: 1
- Campus: Rural area
- Area: 5.09 Acre
- Campus type: Co-educational
- Affiliation: CBSE
- Acronym: OAV Jeypore
- Intermediate (Class - 11 & 12) Courses: Science and Commerce
- Website: www.oavs.in

Odisha Adarsha Vidyalaya, Jayantigiri, Jeypore known as OAV Jayantigiri, Jeypore or OAV Jeypore, is a school under the School and Mass Education Department, Government of Odisha. The school is located near the hilly areas of Jayantigiri in Jeypore Block of Koraput District, Odisha, India.

== History ==
Odisha Adarsha Vidyalaya Sangathan was established on September 19, 2015, as a society under The Society Registration Act of Odisha. Odisha Adarsha Vidyalaya was founded by the Odisha Department of School and Mass Education.

The General Body is the apex body of the Sangathan headed by Hon’ble Minister, School & Mass Education as Chairman. The Executive Body is headed by DC-cum-ACS as Chairman. Present Advisor-cum-Working President is Upendra Tripathy appointed on 3 August 2021 after Dr Bijaya Kumar Sahoo succumbs To Covid-19 on 3 June 2021.

== Admission ==
Students from Jeypore block, Class VI, are selected through an entrance Exam conducted each year by Odisha Adarsha Vidyalaya Sangathan and are given admission to VIth standard/class. The test is largely non-verbal and objective in nature and is designed to prevent any disadvantage to children from rural areas. It also conducts lateral entry based upon availability of seats. The school runs classes from class 6th to 12th

== Affiliation ==
The school is affiliated with the Central Board of Secondary Education (CBSE)., New Delhi with the affiliation number 1520115.

== Facilities ==
The school has been equipped by smart classrooms with digital screens, smartboards, computer lab, and science labs.

== Activities ==
The school observes important commemorative days, Competitions like

- Science Olympiad
- Mathematics Olympiad
- National Talent Search Exam
- National Means Cum Merit Examination
- Science Exhibition

Various Inter-House Cocurricular Activities like

- Youth Parliament
- Hindi week
- Annual sports meets
- Annual Day
- Mass Plantation
- National Science Day
