= Nilok =

- village
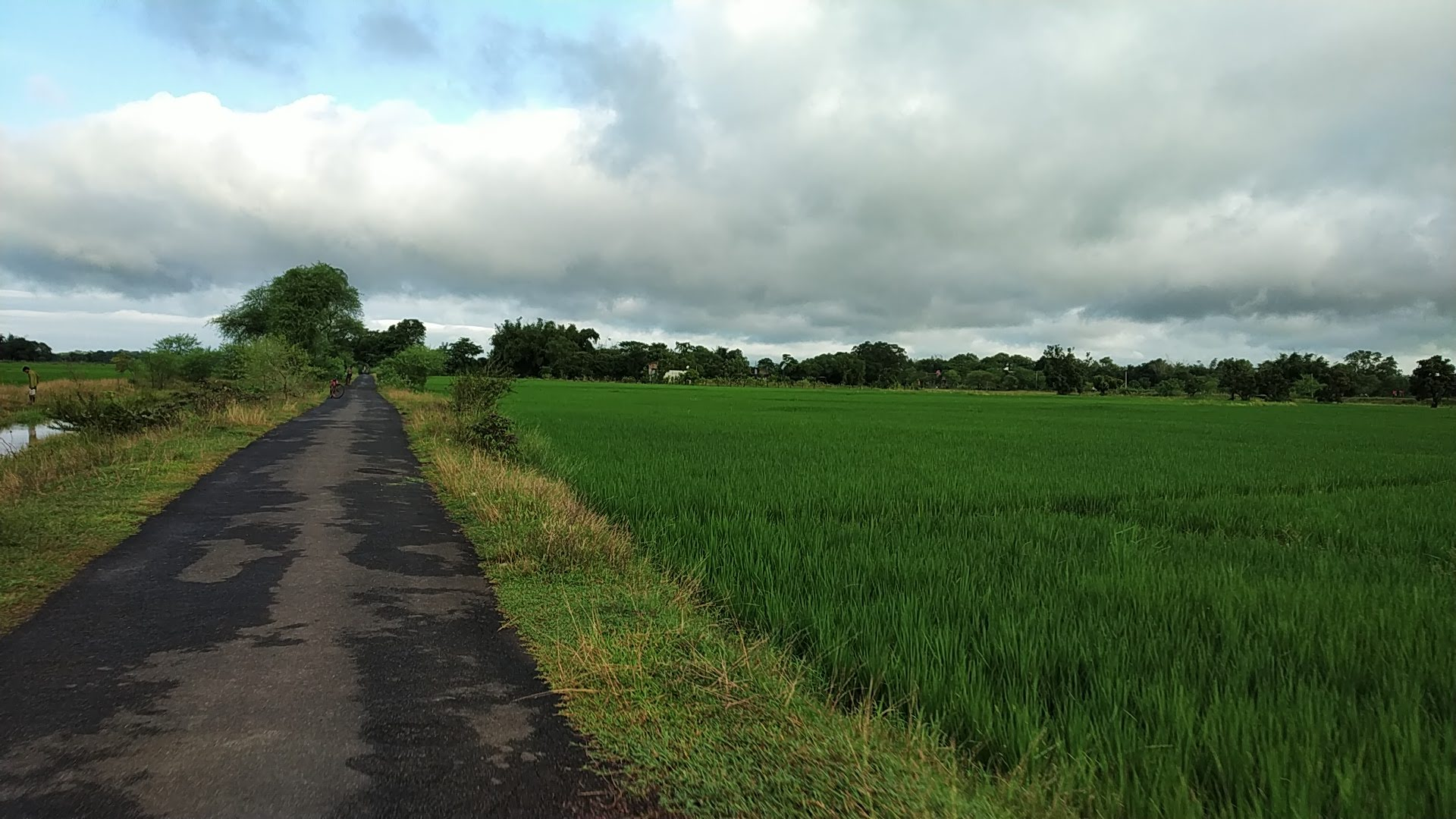
- Green fields of Nilok

- Location in Odisha, India Nilok (India)
- Coordinates: 21.086291°N 86.340909°E
- Country: India
- State: Odisha
- District: Bhadrak

Population (2011)
  - Total: 1,119

Languages
  - Official: Odia
- Time zone: UTC+5:30 (IST)
- Postal code: 756114
- Vehicle registration: OR-22/

Nilok is a village located in Bonth Block of Bhadrak district in the Indian state of Odisha. It is situated 4 kilometres (2.5 mi) away from sub-district headquarters Bant and 28 km (17 mi) away from district headquarters Bhadrak. As per 2009 stats, Nilok is the gram panchayat of Nilok village.

The area covers 149 hectares (370 acres).

== Demographics ==
As of 2011 India census, Nilok had a population of 1,119 (550 male and 569 female), with an effective literacy rate of 86.97%. About 256 houses are present. Infrastructure

Priyabrata Bridge connects the village to Bonth road, while Viku Bridge connects to Gharapada village.

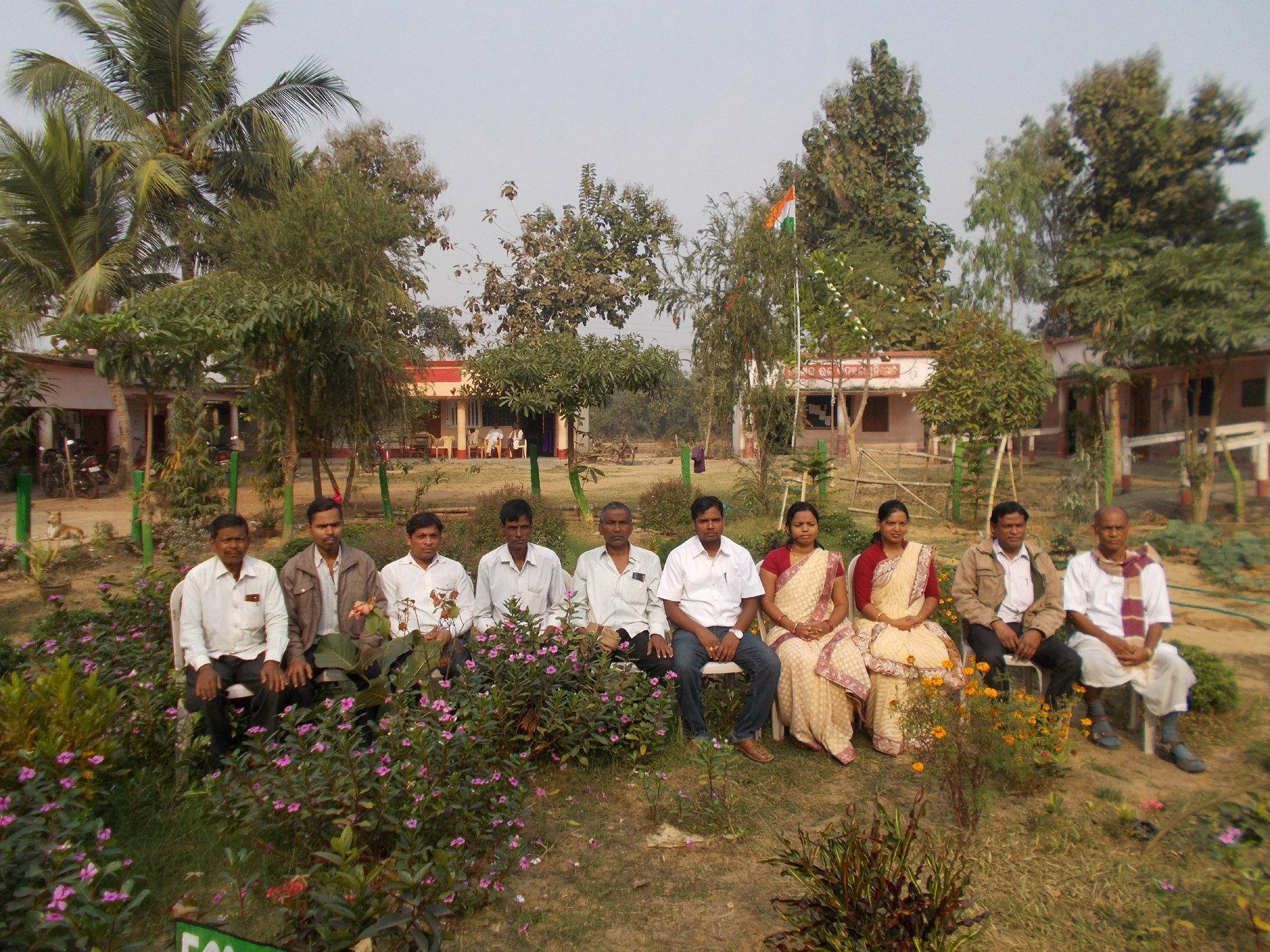

The village has many ponds. Bada Pokhari is a large pond that covers 3 acres (1.2 ha).

== Economy ==
Agriculture is the primary occupation, although some have businesses. A market is nearby. Every family has at least a bike and a TV. The village has a cable tv connection.

== Transport ==
Type	Status
Public Bus Service	Available within village
Private Bus Service	Available within village
Railway Station	Available within 10+ km distance

== Education ==
The village has a Primary School, High School, Sanskrit School and a Sishu Mandir.

School type	Name of the School
Primary	Harihar Nodal UP School
High School	Nilok High School Nilok
Sanskrit School	Babaji Charan Sanskrit Vidyalay
	Adarsha Bidyalaya
Sishu Mandir	Sadhana Vidya Mandir
Adarsh Vidyalaya	Odisha Adarsh Vidyalaya, Palasagadhia

== Culture ==
The name of the village means the place surrounded by oceans. Nilok is famous for Makar Mela, the festival of Maa Baulasuni temple. Other festivals include Rakshaya Bandhan, Ratha, and Dola Purnima. Durga puja, Laxmi puja, Ganesh Puja and Saraswati puja are also celebrated.

=== Temples ===
Shiva Mandir
Maa Mangala (Mangala Danda VP)
Jagannath Mandir
Maa Tarini Mandir
Maa Baulasuni Temple
Kalibasuli
Gramadebati
Mangala
Budhijagulai
