= Capital High School =

Capital is a name for several high schools, generally found in state capital cities. These include:

- Capital High School, Bhubaneswar, Orissa, India
- Capital High School (Boise, Idaho)
- Capital High School (Charleston, West Virginia)
- Capital High School (Helena, Montana)
- Capital High School (Olympia, Washington)
- Capital High School (Santa Fe, New Mexico)
- Capital High School (Madison, Wisconsin)

== See also ==
- Capitol High School (disambiguation)
