= Puri Zilla School =

Puri Zila School
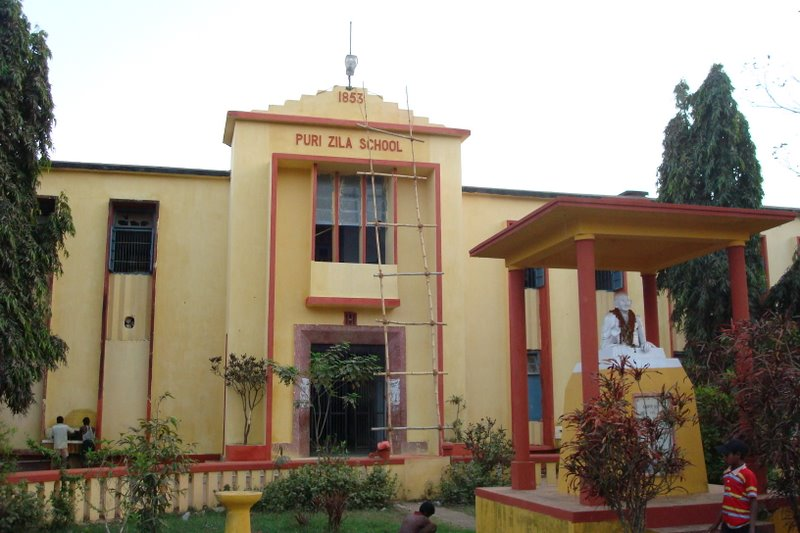

Location
- Puri, Odisha, India; 19°48′15.81″N 85°50′4.83″E

Information
- Founded: 1853; 173 years ago
- Faculty: 45
- Enrollment: 1500
- Colours: Blue and white

Puri Zila School is a government high school and one of the oldest school in Odisha, India. It was established in 1853 in the holy city of Puri, located in Kundheibenta Sahi. The school moved to another building which later converted to Samanta Chandra Sekhara College, Puri. Puri Zila School moved to its current location on Station Road in 1958.

It imparts teaching in humanities, social sciences, physical sciences etc. The school has indoor and outdoor games and sports facilities. Other societies and activities are NCC, Red Cross, Scouts and Guides.

== Noted alumni ==
- Nirmal Kumar Bose, anthropologist
- Gopabandhu Das, Freedom Fighter
- Madhab Chandra Dash, Environmentalist
- Kalindi Charan Panigrahi, poet
- Sachidananda Routray, poet

== See also ==
- Board of Secondary Education, Odisha
- Badagada Government High School, Bhubaneswar
- Capital High School, Bhubaneswar
- Secondary Board High School

== Gallery ==
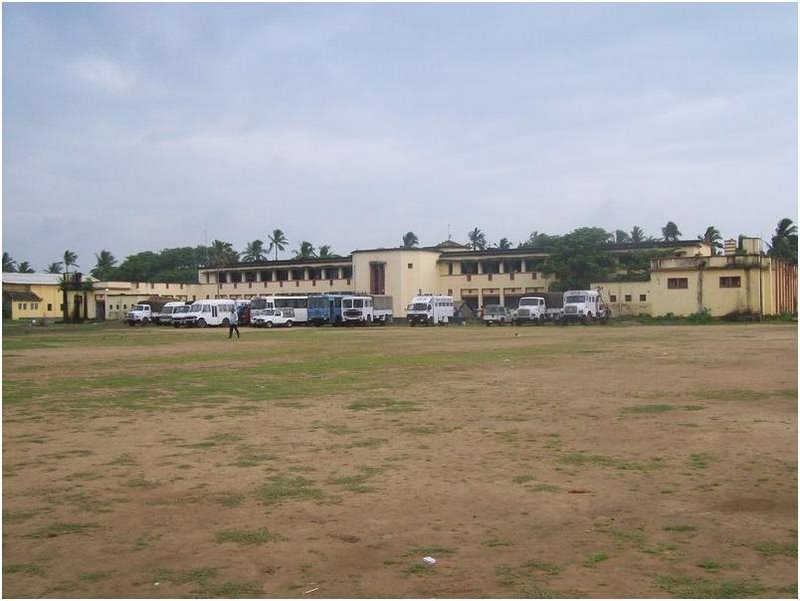
Playground

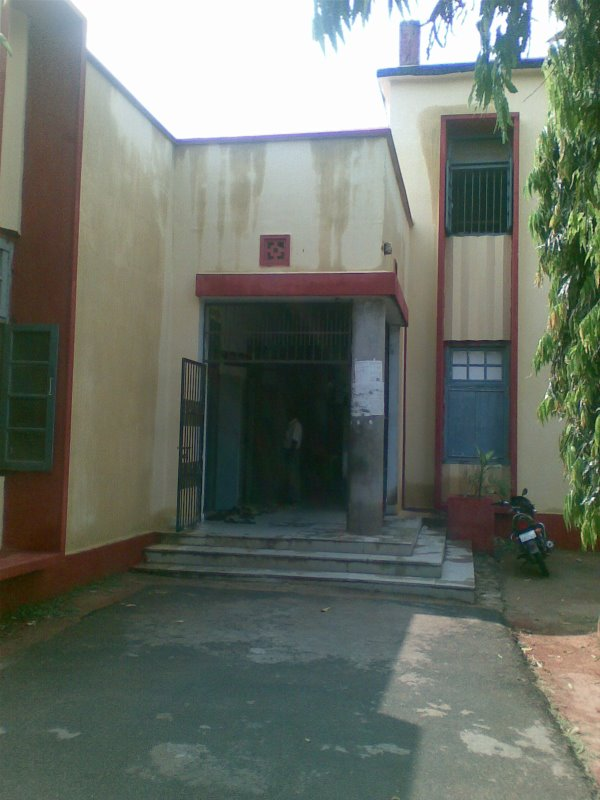
Outside Headmaster's Chamber

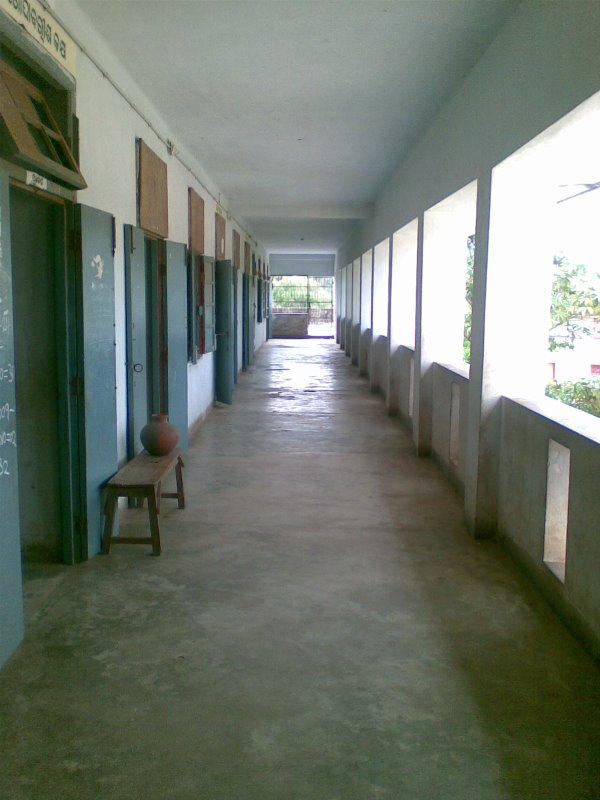
Corridor

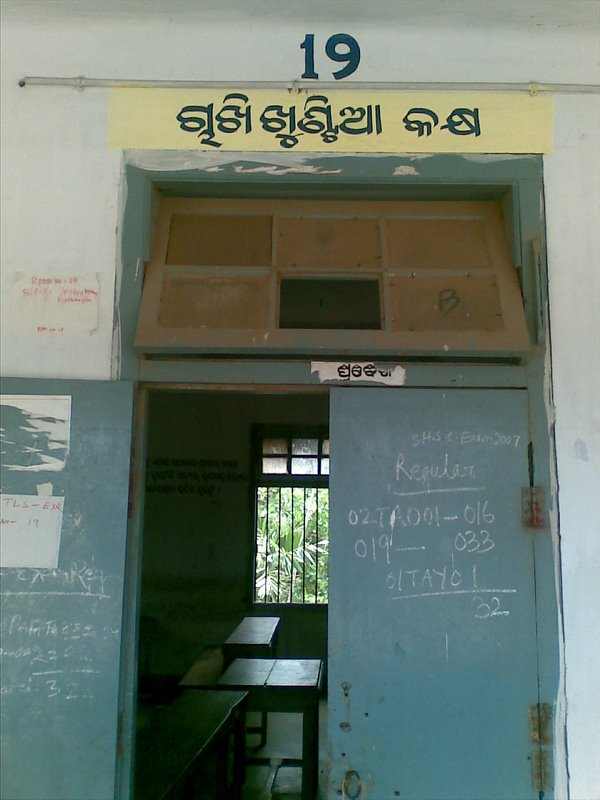
Room 19

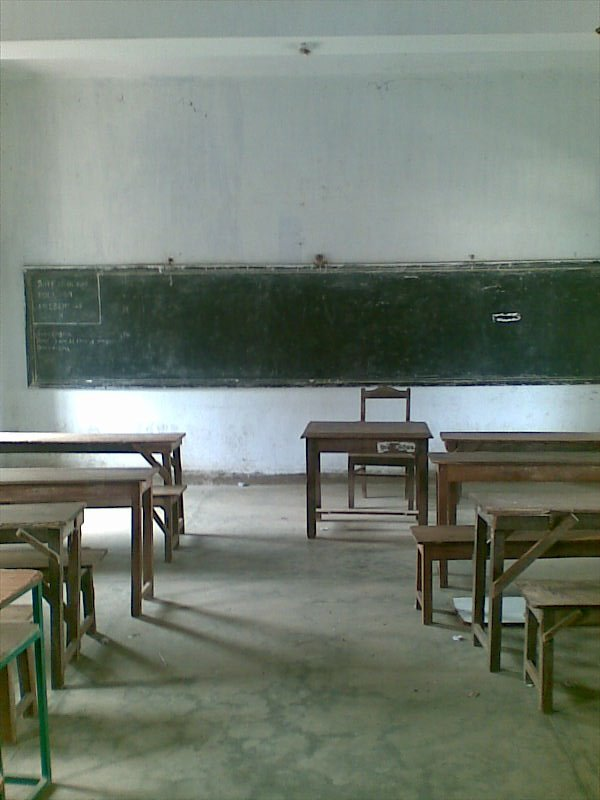
Inside the classroom
