= SBHS =

SBHS may refer to:

- Slavonia-Baranja Croatian Party (Croatian: Slavonsko-baranjska hrvatska stranka), a defunct political party of Croatia

== Schools ==
- St. Barnabas High School, The Bronx, New York, New York, United States
- Sam Barlow High School, Gresham, Oregon, United States
- San Benito High School (California), Hollister, California, United States
- San Benito High School (Texas), San Benito, Texas, United States
- San Bernardino High School, San Bernardino, California, United States
- Santa Barbara High School, Santa Barbara, California, United States
- Secondary Board High School, Cuttack, Odisha, India
- Sheepshead Bay High School, Brooklyn, New York, New York, United States
- Shirley Boys' High School, Christchurch, New Zealand
- South Bromsgrove High School, Bromsgrove, Worcestershire, England
- South Broward High School, Hollywood, Florida, United States
- South Brunswick High School (New Jersey), Monmouth Junction, New Jersey, United States
- South Burlington High School, South Burlington, Vermont, United States
- Southeast Bulloch High School, Brooklet, Georgia, United States
- Southland Boys' High School, Invercargill, New Zealand
- Stone Bridge High School, Ashburn, Virginia, United States
- Sturgis Brown High School, Sturgis, South Dakota, United States
- Sydney Boys High School, Sydney, New South Wales, Australia
- Springs Boys High School, Springs, Gauteng, South Africa
