= Capitol High School =

Capitol High School may refer to:

- Capitol High School (Baton Rouge), Louisiana, US
- Central High School (Detroit), formerly known as Capitol High School

== See also ==
- Capital High School (disambiguation)
- Capitol Hill High School
