= Capital High School, Bhubaneswar =

Capital High School Bhubaneswar
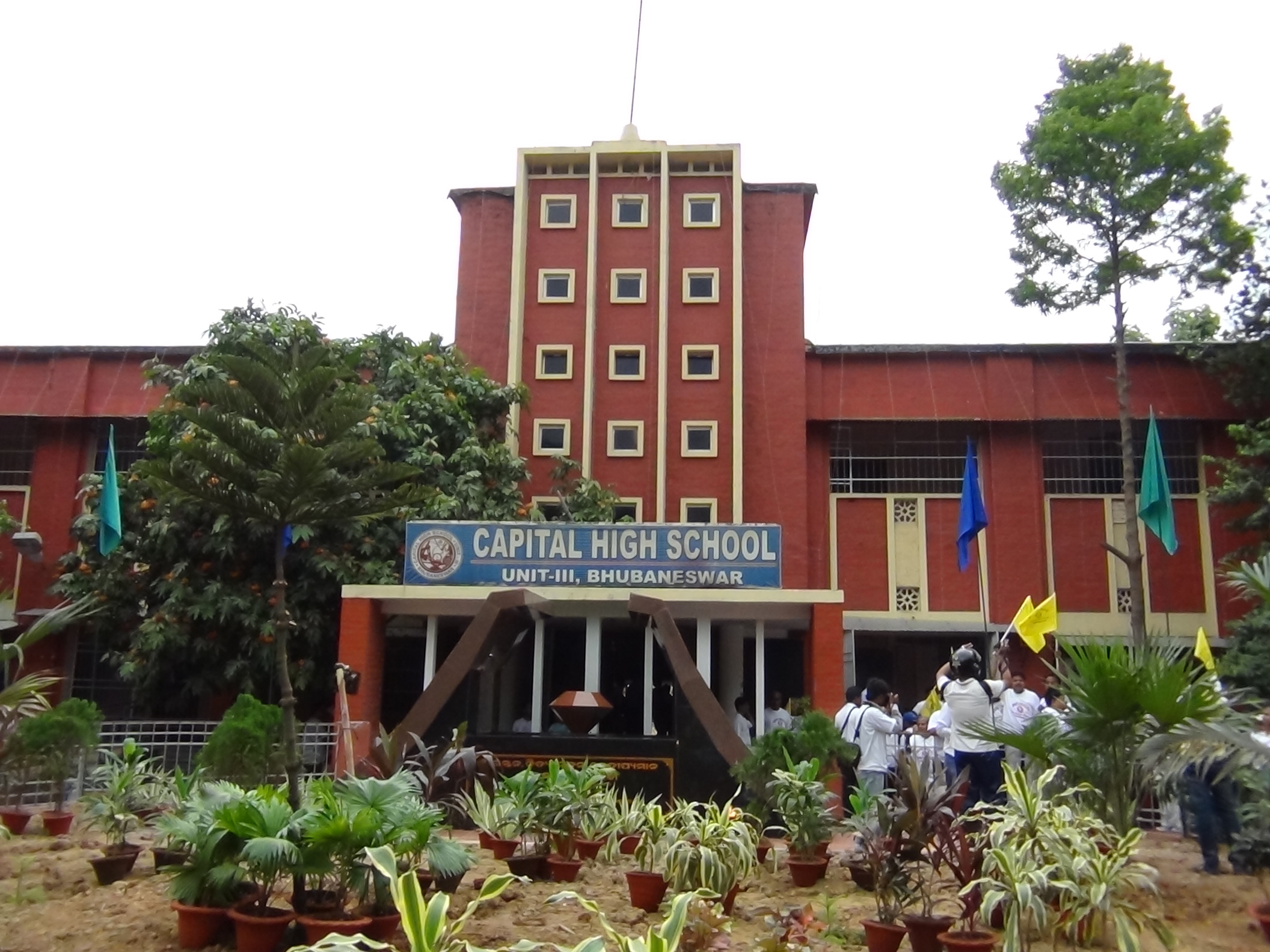
- Bhubaneswar, Odisha, India

Information
- Established: 1951
- Principal: Satyanarayan Dash
- Grades: Class 6th to 10th
- Enrollment: 1,000+
- Website: capitalhighschoolbhubaneswar.com

Capital High School, located in Bhubaneswar, is one of the oldest schools in the Indian state of Odisha and was established in 1951. The school is situated in unit-III near Ram Mandir and is adjacent to St. Joseph's High School and The Blind School. It is affiliated to the Board of Secondary Education, Odisha under State Government of Odisha. Ganesh Chandra Mishra was the first headmaster, taking charge of the newly established school on 16 July 1951. After Mishra, many other teachers such as Laxman Kara and Sarat Chandra Basu have taken over as headmaster and led the school to more success.

The school had its Diamond Jubilee Celebrations in April 2012. India Post has released a Special Cover on 60 years of Capital High School Bhubaneswar.

== Description ==
The notable features of the Capital High School in Bhubaneswar are as follows:

- It has given rise to many well known personalities in science, sports, politics and music etc.
- Excellent infrastructure within the school premises. The huge playground and prayer hall have been used for many state level activities.
- Much stress on formal education of the students as per curriculum
- Importance to games and other physical activities
- Stress on cultural activities like music, dance, art and craft etc.
- Sympathy towards the weaker sections of the society in the form of free hostel accommodation and financial aids.

== Gallery ==
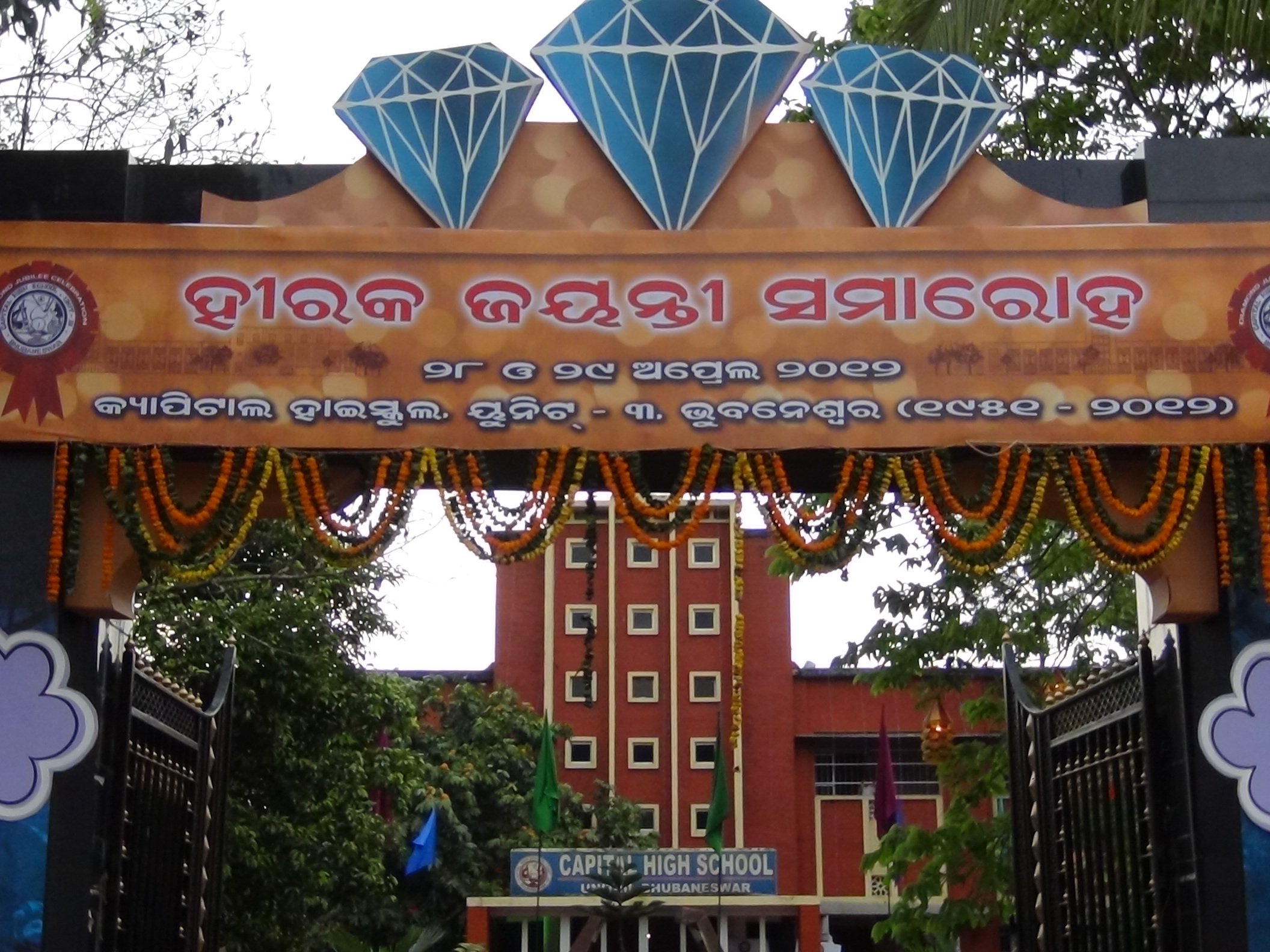
The School Main Gate

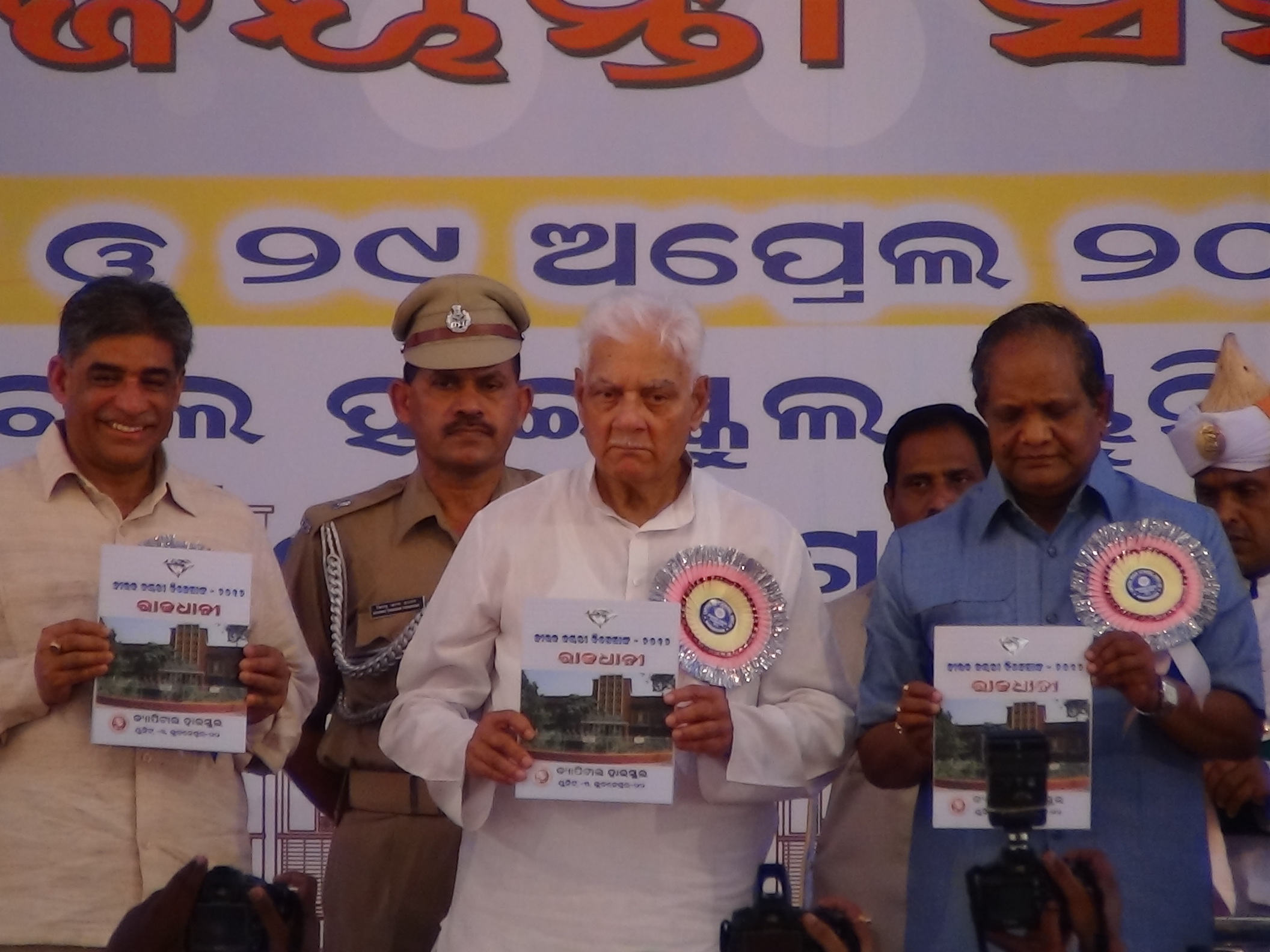
Governor Sri M C Bhandare releasing the souvenir in the Diamond Jubilee Celebration of Capital High School

== See also ==
- Puri Zilla School
- Board of Secondary Education, Odisha
- Secondary Board High School
