= Maa Baulasuni Temple =

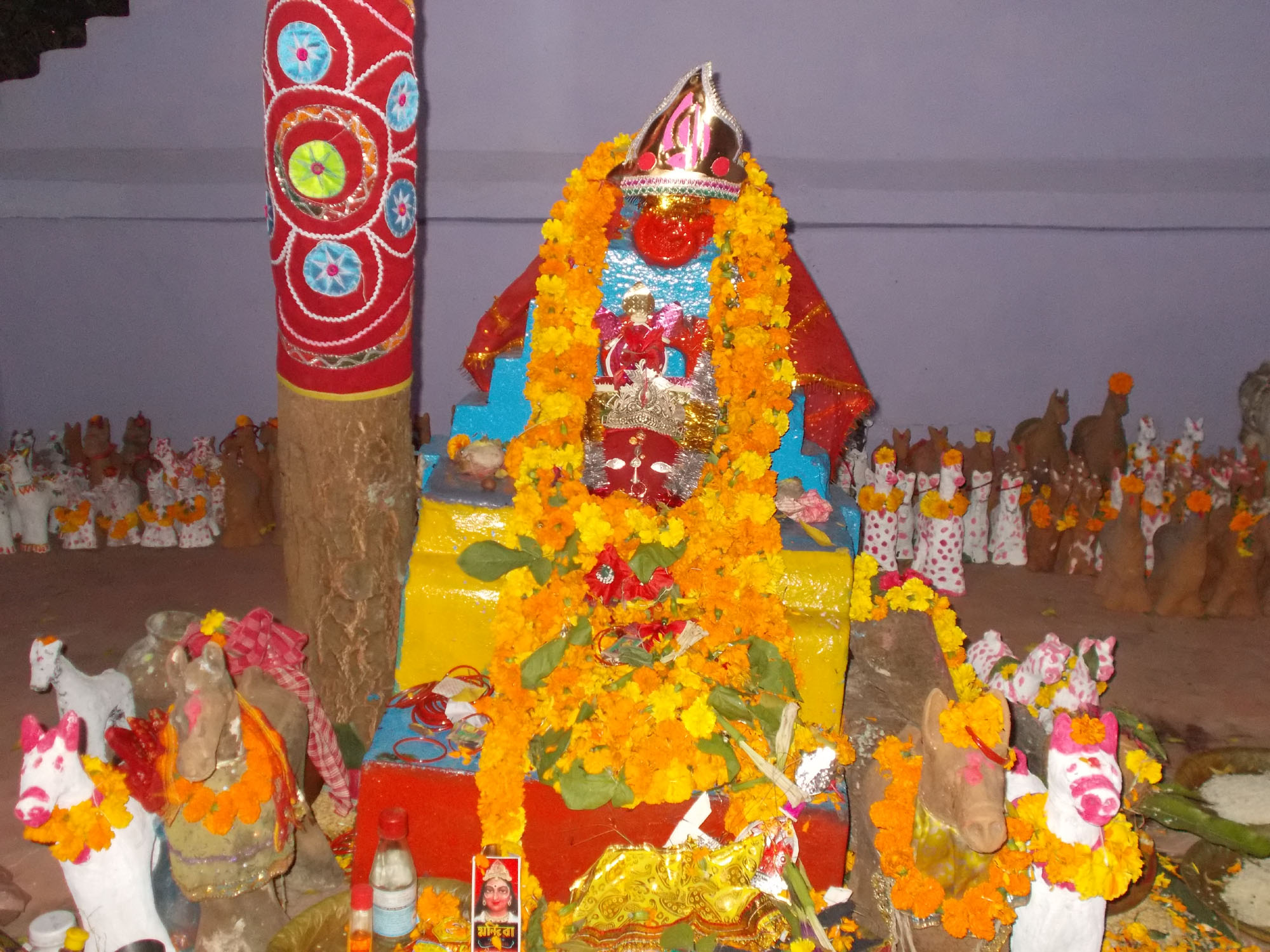
- Idol of Maa Baulasuni

Religion
- Affiliation: Hinduism
- Deity: Maa Baulasuni

Location
- Location: Nilok, Bhadrak district, Odisha, India
- Geographic coordinates: 21.086172°N 86.336102°E

Website
- https://maabaulasuni.gapu.in

Maa Baulasuni Temple is located in the village of Nilok in Bhadrak District, at about a distance of 27 km from the city of Bhadrak. At first there was no temple, the Idol was worshiped under a tree. Then an altar was made where the Idol of Maa Baulasuni placed for worship. The present temple was built on 1969 and the "Yagya Mandap" was built on the year of 2000.

== Conceptualisation of Maa Baulasuni ==
Maa Baulasuni is the goddess of Hindus in northern Odisha. Maa Baulasuni is always depicted as a red face with two large eyes and a mark in the middle which serves as an indication for a nose and also a tilak. The ornate letters in the background mean "Maa", which means Mother in the Oriya language. She protects the locality from danger. People says that she wanders in night on black horse. She fulfils all the wishes of people who pray to her.

== History ==
A long time ago, a Hindu Brahman who worshiped in Kolkata saw some children play with a round shaped stone under a Tentuli tree. The children worshiped that stone. That man saw the stone properly and felt that stone must not be a simple one. He spoke of it to another person who lived nearer to that tree. They both slept near the tree to known what the stone was. At night, both of them had the same dream—that Maa Baulasuni lives near that tree and stays there like a stone. From that day onwards, they worshipped Maa Baulasuni as the protector of that village.

== Festivals ==
During Makar Sankranti on January 14, there starts a Yagnya and going for 3days. The festival is known as Makar Mela. The priests make Yagya in front of the temple and Chandi Patha. The fare going approximately 15 to 20 days. Many people come to that temple to worship and to fulfil their wishes. In the last day of Yagnya at the time of PURNAHUTI Maa comes through a ladies and says the problems in the village and the faults of people. If someone puts a coconut in the fire of Yagnya Kunda and make a wish Maa surely fulfil their wish. At the last of the fare the village people brings a Yatra Party and they plays near the field called as Maa Baulasuni Padia.
