= Bijaya Kumar Sahoo =

Indian educationalist (1963–2021)

- ବିଜୟ କୁମାର ସାହୁ
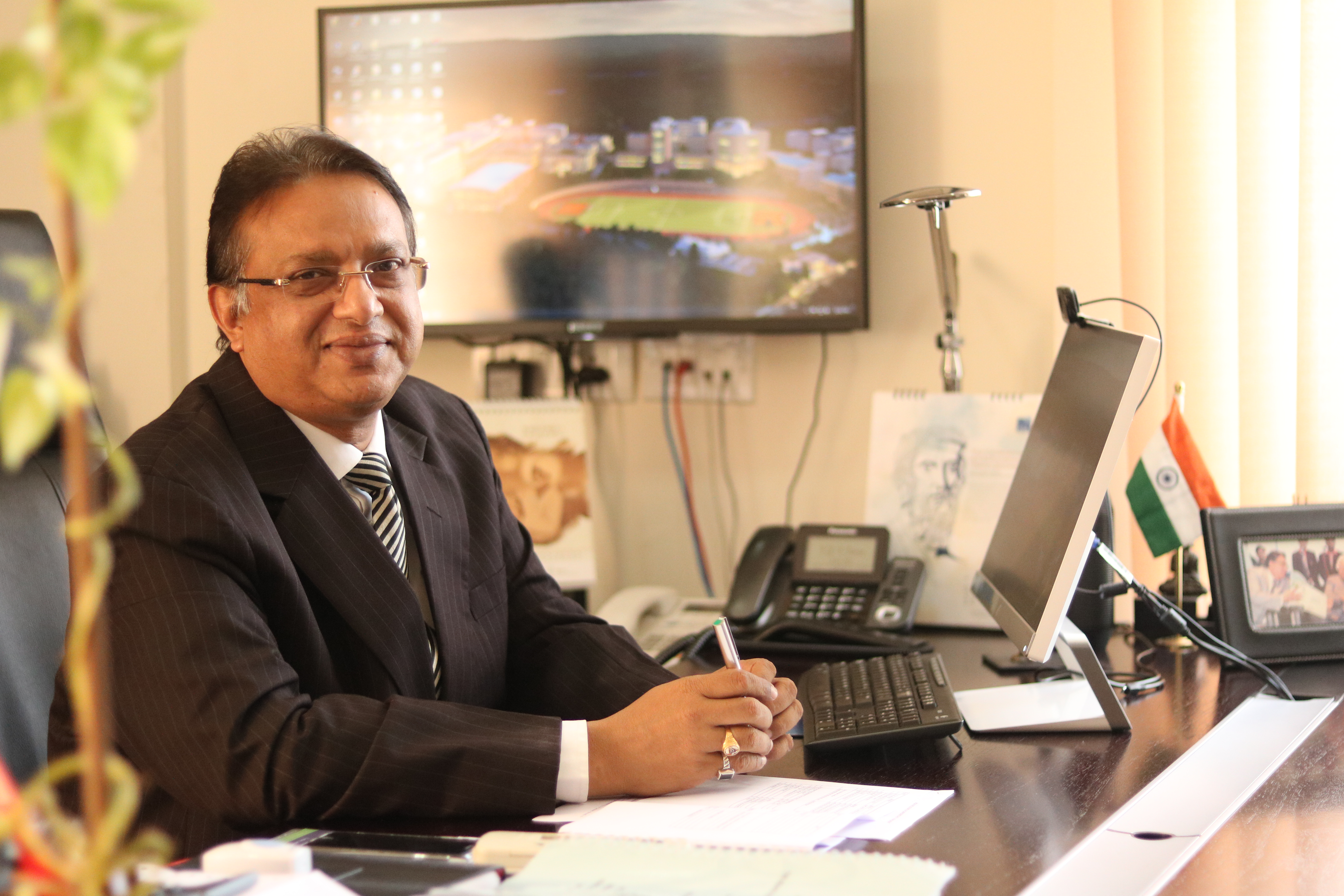
- Bijaya Kumar Sahoo

Advisor-cum-working president Odisha Adarsha Vidyalaya
- In office 24 June 2019 – 3 June 2021
- Succeeded by: Upendra Tripathy

Personal details
- Born: 1 June 1963 Bhubaneshwar, Odisha, India
- Died: 3 June 2021 (aged 58) Hyderabad, Telangana, India
- Spouse: Silpi Sahoo
- Education: Ravenshaw College, Utkal University, Chartered Accountancy, Institute of Chartered Accountants of India, New Delhi
- Occupation: Chartered Accountant, Educationist and Entrepreneur
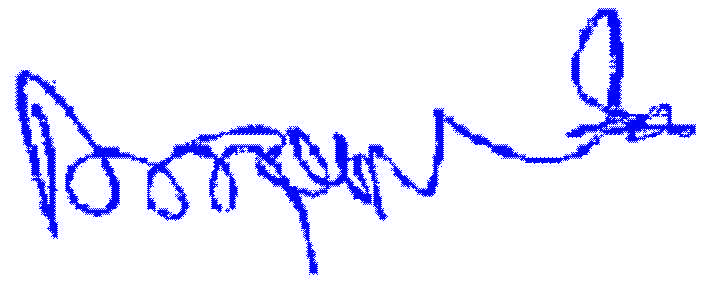
- Signature
- Website: bijayaksahoo.com

Bijaya Kumar Sahoo (June 1, 1963 – June 3, 2021) was an Indian educationalist and businessman from Bhubaneswar, Odisha. He was the founder and chairman of SAI International School, Bhubaneswar, SAI Angan, and SAI International Residential School. Indian Institute of Management Calcutta (IIM Calcutta) has published a case study on the life of Bijaya Kumar Sahoo, Founder-Chairman SAI International. He was appointed as the Advisor cum Working President of Odisha Adarsha Vidyalaya, Department of School and Mass Education, Government of Odisha on 24 June 2019 by Chief Minister of Odisha. He founded the JSS group which established first private STP (Software Technology Park)in Odisha.
