= Government High School, Saheed Nagar =

Location
- Bhubaneswar, Odisha, India; 20.291057°N 85.845590°E

Information
- Established: 1968
- Principal: Puspa Rani Praharaj
- Grades: 6 - 10
- Enrollment: 375
- Campus size: 2.75 acre

Government High School, Saheed Nagar(established : 1968) is a government high school located in Bhubaneswar . It is co-ed school . The medium of teaching is Odia . It is located at a central place of Bhubaneswar called Saheed Nagar. Mrs Puspa Rani Praharaj is currently working as the Head Mistress of the School.

== History ==
School was established in the year 1968 as a private school . Govt of Odisha taken over the school in 1971. The first Head Master was Mr. Shyam Sundar Patnaik.

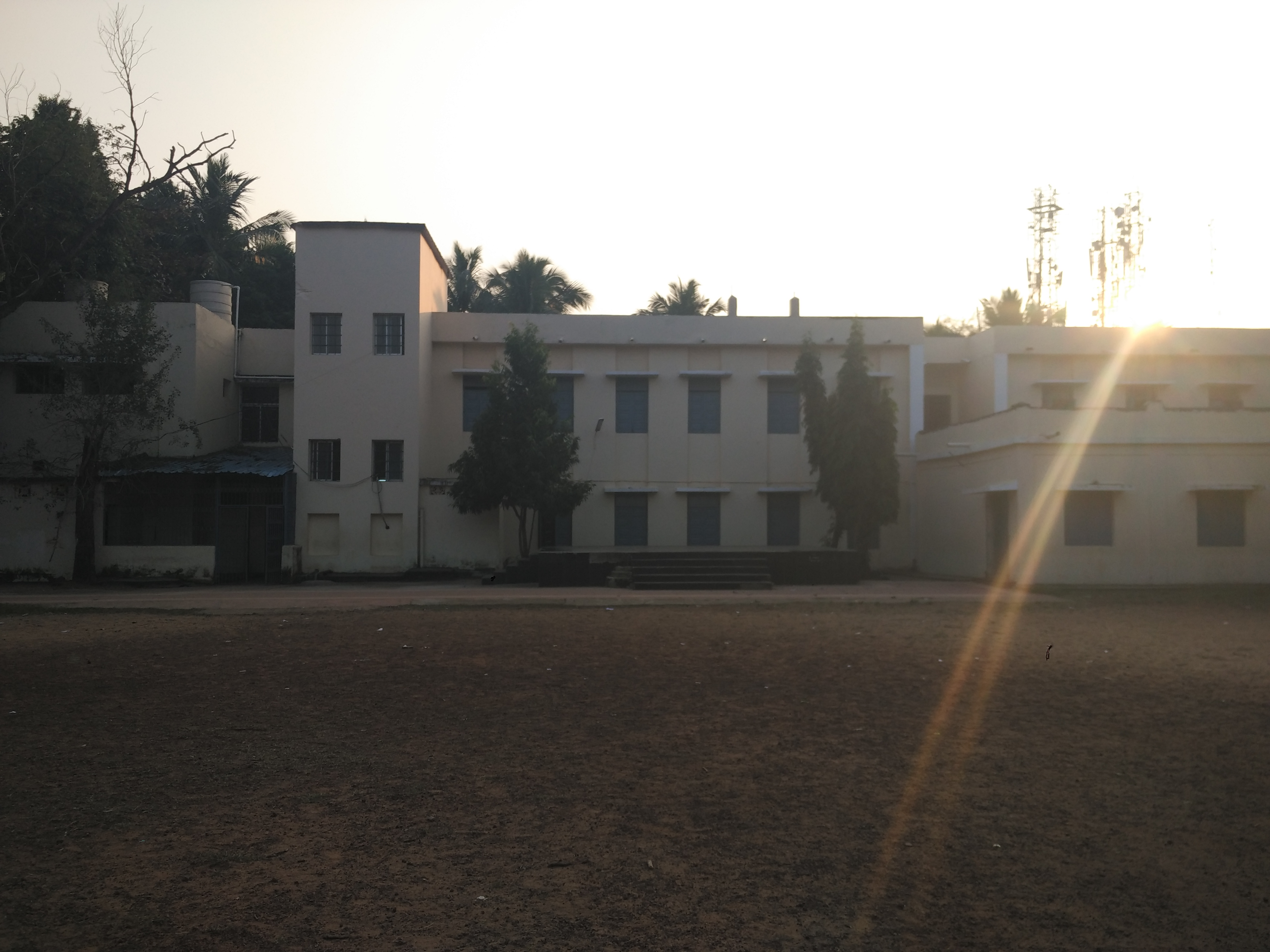
View from the Play Ground

== Facilities ==
The school provides secondary education. A Bhubaneswar Municipal Corporation school directory published in 2025 identifies Government High School, Saheed Nagar as a government school offering classes from Class I through Class X and classifies it as a secondary school. The directory gives the UDISE code as 21171302001. The school has 20 teachers and 2 non-teaching staffs apart from the Head Master . School gives equal emphasis to both studies and extra curricular activities. It has got a play ground inside the campus . Scout, NCC, Red Cross wings are available in the school . The other clubs running in the school are Eco Club, Science Club and Culture Club. The school publishes a magazine named as "Saheed" . Students of this school has participated in many state and national competitions and won prizes .

The school has also appeared in Government of Odisha land-administration records. A 2023 Government of Odisha publication concerning allotment of government land lists "Govt. High School Saheed Nagar" and records land recommended for alienation in favour of the School and Mass Education Department for use by the school.

== Notable events ==
In July 2016, The Times of India reported on infrastructure problems affecting government schools in Bhubaneswar and quoted the then headmistress of Government High School, Saheed Nagar, Pushpa Rani Praharaj, concerning the condition of parts of the school's building and electrical infrastructure.

The school has also appeared in published records of academic achievement. A compilation of Board of Secondary Education, Odisha matriculation results records Jajneswar Dash as a 1983 matriculation candidate from Government High School, Saheednagar, Bhubaneswar, with a reported score of 675 marks. The school has also appeared in published records of academic achievement. A compilation of Board of Secondary Education, Odisha matriculation results records Jajneswar Dash as a 1983 matriculation candidate from Government High School, Saheednagar, Bhubaneswar, with a reported score of 675 marks.
