= SAI International School =

Location
- Plot No.5-A & 6-B, Chandrasekharpur, Infocity Road, Bhubaneswar, Odisha 751031; 20.344659°N 85.814576°E

Information
- Founded: April 2008
- Founder: Late Dr Bijaya Kumar Sahoo
- Sister school: SAI Angan, SAI International Residential School
- Grades: Pre School to 12
- Yearbook: SAIONEERS
- Affiliation: CBSE, New Delhi, IGCSE, IBCP
- Website: www.saiinternational.edu.in

SAI International School is a CBSE cum IGCSE cum IBCP affiliated, day-cum boarding, co-educational school in Bhubaneswar, Odisha. It was founded by Late Dr. Bijaya Kumar Sahoo in 2008, and is affiliated to the Central Board of Secondary Education, New Delhi.

The school received the D. L. Shah National Quality Gold Award by the Quality Council of India, and was ranked 1st in the Education World India School Rankings 2020-21 . It was again ranked 1st second year in a row in the EducationWorld India School Ranking 2021–22. SAI International was included by Fortune India in the list of "Future 50 Schools Shaping Success". It was also awarded the International School Award in the "exemplary" category by the British Council for its achievements. SAI International School, Bhubaneswar, has been recognized as one of only six elite schools in India and the sole institution in Odisha to receive the prestigious 'Ivy League' status in the EducationWorld India School Rankings (EWISR) 2025–26.

SAI Angan, the play school of the SAI International School, with a total area of 1,50,000 square feet caters to 1500 students in the age group of 2 to 7 years. SAI Angan was granted the International School Award (ISA) 2018-21 by the British Council on Wednesday, December 5, 2018. SAI Angan is the Asia's largest and Eastern India's best (No.1) play school.
