= Ghanashyam Hemlata Vidya Mandir, Jharsuguda =

Indian residential private school

Ghanashyam Hemlata Vidya Mandir
- G.H.V.M School

Location
- Jharsuguda, Odisha; India; 21°52′21.0″N 84°03′02.9″E

Information
- Type: Private School
- Motto: The vision is to educate students from the local and rural areas of Jharsuguda Town ship with an assurance of teacher’s individual attention to students promoting high quality education and taking care of character building is our solo motto. So that they become enlightened individuals responsible citizens and above all good human beings.
- Established: 1995
- Founder: Ghanashayam Jena with FCI Worker’s co-operative credit society ltd
- School board: C.B.S.E
- School district: Jharsuguda
- School number: 1530088
- Chairman: Ghanashayam Jena
- Principal: Sanjukta Das
- Language: English
- Campus size: 13 Acre
- Accreditation: C.B.S.E Afflicted
- Website: ghvmjsg.org.in

Ghanashyam Hemlata Vidya Mandir (G.H.V.M.) school is a senior secondary English-medium school located in Jharsuguda, Odisha. Two G.H.V.M campuses are present, one in the Jharsuguda District of Odisha, and the other in Puri, Konark.

G.H.V.M. is a progressive co-educational English medium school named after its founder-cum-chairman Shri Ghanashyam Jena and his wife SMT Hemalata Devi. Financial support came from to the founder, the FCI workers’ union, the petroleum products handlers and Careers Employees Union. This school is one of the 21,405 C.B.S.E affiliated schools in India.

== History ==
The first building was established on a 13-acre site in 1995. The school functions under the direction of Pabitra Mohan Behera (secretary) and the managing committee of the GHVM Society (registered under the Society Registration Act no. NO.S/27929 of 1995, Delhi). Affiliation No. 1530088. Classes serve up to 10th standard. The school planned to offer senior secondary education in 2016, School Reg. No B53014.

== See also ==
- Ghanashyama Hemalata Institute of Technology and Management
- Ghanashyam Hemlata Vidya Mandir, Puri
