= Odisha Adarsha Vidyalaya =

Public school in Odisha, India

Odisha Adarsha Vidyalaya transl. Odisha Model School

Information
- Type: Public school
- Motto: ଅନୁପ୍ରେରଣ ଏବଂ ସଶକ୍ତିକରଣ (Inspire and Empower)
- Established: 19 September 2015; 11 years ago
- School board: CBSE
- Authority: Department of School and Mass Education, Government of Odisha
- Key people: Smita Rout, IAS (State Project Director)
- Grades: VI - XII
- Age range: 10-18
- Language: English (India)
- Affiliation: CBSE
- Information: 315 (functional schools)
- Website: www.oav.edu.in

Odisha Adarsha Vidyalaya (transl. Odisha Model School) is a chain of schools which are being set up, one at each of 314 block headquarters in the state of Odisha, India.

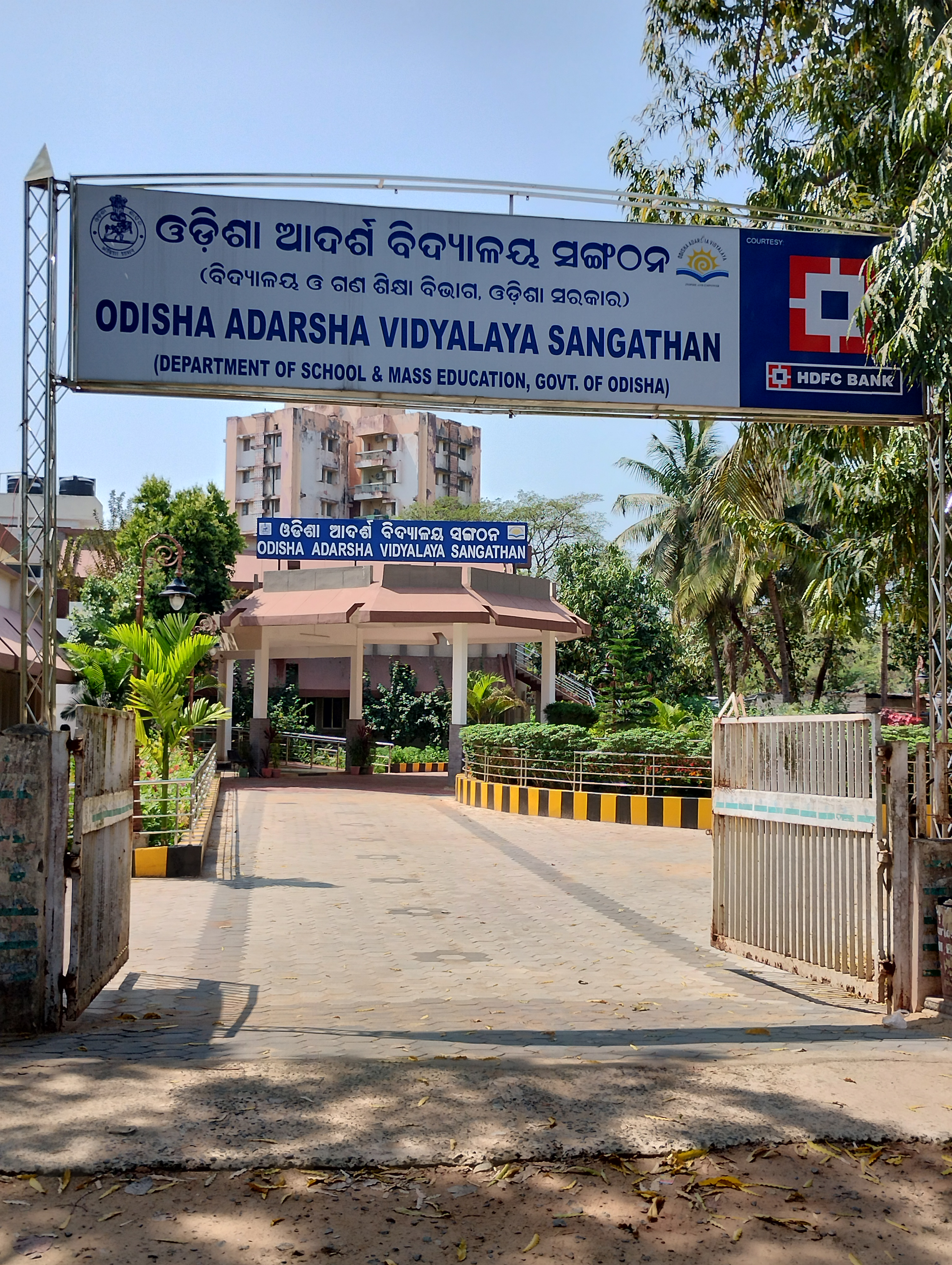
Odisha Adarsha Vidyalaya HQ

== History ==
Odisha Adarsha Vidyalaya Sangathan (transl. Odisha Model Schools Organisation) was established on 19 September 2015 as a society under The Society Registration Act of Odisha, by the Department of School and Mass Education, Government of Odisha.

The general body is the apex body of the Sangathan headed by Minister, Department of School & Mass Education as chairman. The present advisor and working president is Upendra Tripathy, who was appointed on 3 August 2021 following the death of Bijaya Kumar Sahoo on 3 June 2021.

These Adarsha Vidyalayas would be CBSE affiliated fully day boarding schools, provide free education, and target talented students through an annual entrance examination. They would have Class VI through Class XII and each class would have 80 students. These schools would be administered through Odisha Adarsha Vidyalaya Sangathan, a society registered under the Society Registration Act of Odisha.
