= Upendra Tripathy =

Indian Administrative Service officer

Upendra Tripathy IAS
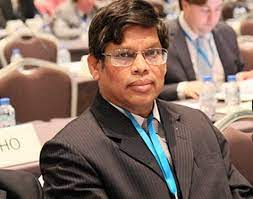

1st Director General of International Solar Alliance
- In office 2016–2021
- Preceded by: Position Established
- Succeeded by: Ajay Mathur

Personal details
- Born: 5 October 1956 (age 69) Kahakapur, Ganjam, Odisha, India
- Education: Jawaharlal Nehru University; Carleton University (Ottawa, Canada)
- Occupation: IAS officer
- Profession: Civil servant

Shri Upendra Tripathy (born 5 October 1956) is a retired Indian Administrative Service (IAS) officer of Karnataka Cadre. He is the first Director General of the International Solar Alliance. Well known for receiving the prestigious Prime Minister’s Awards for Excellence in Public Administration in individual category, Tripathy received several other awards for his innovations and ideas during his career as a civil servant. He was the first and founding Director General of International Solar Alliance which the first treaty based International Organisation head-quartered in India. ISA is an alliance of 121 countries worldwide focusing on solar power utilisation, co-operation, and sustainable energy.

Previously, Mr. Tripathy was the Secretary to Ministry of New and Renewable Energy from 1 April 2014 until 31 October 2016. Mr. Tripathy has been appointed as Advisor cum working president and chairman of executive committee of Odisha Adarsha Vidyalaya on 3 August 2021 after the death of previous Advisor cum chairman Dr. Bijaya Kumar Sahoo in June 2021 due to covid

== Background ==
Tripathy (born 5 October 1956) was the first and founding Director General of International Solar Alliance (ISA). He is from Odisha, India. In ex-officio capacity, he has headed as chairperson, Solar Energy Corporation of India (SECI), National Institute of Solar Energy and National Institute of Wind Energy, National Institute of Bio Energy, and Association of Renewable Energy Agencies of States (AREAS).

Initially, he was selected to be the Interim Director General of the newly formed International Solar Alliance, and later he became the first and founding Director General of ISA. Mr. Tripathy is an Indian Administrative Service (IAS) officer of Karnataka Cadre, known for his innovations, ideas and hard work. He has worked with local, provincial and union government in India over the last 40 years and was the 18th secretary of the Ministry of New and Renewable Energy, established in 1982, one of the oldest Ministries in the world in the area of new and renewable energy. He replaced Satish Agnihotri as Secretary on 1 April 2014.

Mr. Tripathy was born and spent his early life in Kahakapur, a remote coastal hamlet in the tail ends of Eastern Ghats hills, near Rambha, Odisha, close to Asia's largest lagoon, Chilika. Tripathy studied in Ravenshaw College, Jawaharlal Nehru University and Carleton University, Ottawa, Canada. He has published one volume of poetry from Writer's Workshop titled Caged. Best known for his turning around of the city transportation in Bangalore, he received the Extraordinary Citizen award in 2008 from Rotarians in Bangalore, usually reserved for Chief Ministers and doyens of the industry.

== Education ==
Tripathy has done his master's in Political Science from Jawaharlal Nehru University, New Delhi and master's in Public Administration from Carleton University, Ottawa, Canada. He has undergone various training programme in areas of programme implementation, financial management, sustainable development, quantitative methods and operational research for public policy and management and e-governance. He has also undergone a six weeks SIDA training programme in Sweden in areas of environmental management.

== Career ==
His institution building abilities and innovations got reflected in building of Hassan Kalamandir (1989), Center for infrastructure, Sustainable Transportation and Urban Planning (CiSTUP) in Indian Institute of Science (2009), Environmental Management Policy Research Institute (EMPRI) (2003), Akshar Foundation (2001), turnaround of Bangalore Metropolitan Transport Corporation (BMTC) (2003–2008) and institution of Nrupatunga Award in Karnataka (2008). For these achievements, and for all his work in transforming a city Transport undertaking in Bangalore into a profit making one, the Prime Minister of India bestowed the PM's Award for Excellence in Public Administration on Tripathy in 2009.

Before joining ISA, Tripathy was Secretary to the Ministry of New & Renewable Energy. Previous to that, he was Adviser (Agriculture and Marine Products) in the Indian Embassy in Brussels. He held the post of Additional Secretary, Cabinet Secretariat; Joint Secretary, Minority Affairs and Deputy Secretary, Ministry of Petroleum & Natural Gas in the Central Government; as well as Chairperson of Karnataka State Pollution Control Board. He has worked in several sectors such as — revenue administration, rural development, petroleum conservation, agriculture and horticulture, agricultural marketing, education, environment & transportation, and renewable energy.

== Work Area and Innovation ==
| S.No | Designation / Place | Work Areas / innovative initiatives | Period of service |
|---|---|---|---|
| 1 | Assistant Commissioner, Puttur, Karnataka. | Land administration, rural development, law and order management. Rehabilitation programmes, disaster management. | To 1982 to 1984 |
| 2 | District Rural Development Society, Department of Rural Development, Chitradurga. | Project formulation, implementation, management and monitoring in areas. Watersheds (soil, crop, water and training of farmers), afforestation employment generation, drought management, water management, anti-poverty programs. | 1984–1986 |
| 3 | Dy. Commissioner (Vigilance), Department of Commercial Taxes, Department of Finance, Bangalore. | Tax compliance and tax administration, environmental taxation. | 1986–1987 |
| 4 | District Magistrate & DC, Department of Revenue and Home, Hassan. Administrator, Hassan City Development Authority. President, Hassan District Cooperative Bank. Administrator, Agricultural Price Marketing Societies. Chairman, Hassan Central School. President, Hassan City Municipality. | Law and order, excise administration, rehabilitation, local governance, banking, agricultural marketing. Achievements: Founded Hassan Kala Mandir, Officer's Club Building, got land for Central School, turned around Hassan City Municipality in revenue generation from annual exhibitions. | 1987–1989 |
| 5 | Director, Agricultural Marketing & Secretary to the Agricultural Marketing Board, Bangalore. | World Bank program to strengthen marketing infrastructure in rural Karnataka. Administration of agricultural marketing societies. Enforcement of farmer oriented policies. | 1989–1989 |
| 6 | Chief Secretary (Zilla Parishad), Gulbarga. | Rural development and administration of all field level departments in the grassroots level – education health and family welfare, agriculture, horticulture social forestry, soil conservation, minor irrigation, sericulture, social welfare, block development, anti-poverty programmes, Pancayati Raj institutions, rural electrification, | 1989–1990 |
| 7 | Dy Secretary, M/o Petroleum & Natural Gas, New Delhi | Petroleum exploration, petroleum conservation and global tendering of oil block both onshore and off shore. | 1990–1992 |
| 8 | On Foreign Training and study leave in Carleton University, Ottawa, Canada with CIDA scholarship, Indira Gandhi Scholarship and Commonwealth scholarship. | Completed masters programme in Public Administration. Completed course work and proposal defence for PhD thesis on India's ozone management policy (incomplete). | 1992–1996 |
| 9 | Director (Personnel and Environment), Karnataka State Road Transport Corporation, Bangalore. | 76,000 employees. Introduced environmental cell in KSTRC. Planted thousands of teak trees in vacant lands of the corporation. | 1996–1999 |
| 10 | Commissioner, Public Instruction, Bangalore. | 300,000 teachers and one crore students. Built Sikshaykar Sadan with collection of one day's salary from employees, introduced Sikshyan Barte, a monthly magazine, mobile schools for slum children, computer centres for teachers’ training, and got Akshar Foundation established and registered. | 1999–2001 |
| 11 | Secretary, Department of Agriculture and Horticulture, Bangalore. | Strengthened R&D centres in the department, new programs to promote palm oil cultivation as a climate resilient crop, measures to strengthen Lal Bagh society, and planned Lal Bagh II in Bangalore. | 2001–2002 |
| 12 | Chairman, Karnataka Pollution Control Board. | Established the new office building in MG Road, brought in pension for employees, successful implementation of World Bank programme to strengthen infrastructure, introduction of mobile labs, multi-structural devilment. | 2002–2003 |
| 13 | Managing Director, Bangalore Metropolitan Transport Corporation (BMTC), Bangalore. | Made a corporate profit of more than 650 crore during his tenure. Brought in all round welfare measure for employees. Bus strength went up to 6000. Introduced Volvo buses in the city and Vayu Bajra to and from airport. Got around 1700 acres of land for future projects. Ten TTMCs were sanctioned by GoI under JNNURM. This was a period of expansion and consolidation. CiSTUP and EMPRI were established. Nrupathunga Award was instituted with a corpus grant from BMTC. | 2003–2008 |
| 14 | Principal Secretary, Home and Transport, Vidhan Soudha, Bangalore. | Major law and order problems tackled. In the transport front, many petroleum conservation programmes and anti-pollution measures were tackled. Home and Transport departments were combined long after. | 2008–2009 |
| 15 | Joint Secretary, Ministry of Minority Affairs. | Spearheaded many programmes for social inclusion of minorities. Computerisation of programmes and speed of delivery. | 2009–2010 |
| 16 | Joint Secretary/Additional Secretary, Cabinet Secretariat, Rastrapati Bhawan, New Delhi. | Assisted Cabinet Secretary in supervising 27 Ministries, attended to Cabinet matters, and processed matters pertaining to climate change and environment. | 2010–2013 |
| 17 | Advisor (Agriculture and Marine Products – trade), Embassy of India, Brussels. | Attended to bilateral trade issues between India and Belgium, India and Luxemburg, and India and EU. | 2013–2014 |
| 18 | Secretary, MNRE, Block 14, CGO Complex. New Delhi. | 175,000 MW target up to 2022. New land for office after 34 years of waiting. The budget goes up from 1500 cr (14-15) to 6000 cr by 16–17. Association of Renewable Agencies of the States (AREAS) formed. International Solar Alliance launched. Officers’ long-pending promotions streamlined. Nomenclature of three institutions changed to National Institutes. Solar Energy Corporation of India turns profitable. SECI's authorised capital increased to 6,000 Cr. World Solar Museum green flagged. National Renewable Energy University planned. | 2014–2016 |
| 19 | Director General, International Solar Alliance. | Concept of ISA translated into a world class organization with HQ in India.; 69 member strong ISA's Governance structure put in place with India,(President) France, (Copredident) Vice Presidents Peru, Togo, Tonga, and the UK.; 128 cr. collected for ISA from corporate partners who launched the Coalition for Sustainable Climate Action as a global platform.; Strong 40 partner network established globally.; M.Tech international programne commenced in Delhi IIT.; International MBA program to commence by Delhi IIT from next year.; ISA Care initiative, STARC network, INFOPEDIA and 47 projects for LDCs and SIDS countries commenced.; World Solar Technology Summit held with 10,500 virtual participants and World Solar Investment Summit planned for 2021.; Three Assemblies successfully held. SUNWORLD held in Peru as a global signature event.; Demand aggregation carried out for 272,000 pumps and 47 million Home Power Systems.; World Solar Bank & One Sun, One World, and One Grid - ideas of Prime Minister Modi - crystallised. | 2017 - Till date |

== Awards ==
| Sr. No | Subject | Year | Name |
| 1 | Transport | 2007 | Silver Award from Harmony for having brought fundamental changes in Transport system in Bangalore. |
| 2 | Urban Development | 2007 | International Gold Star Millennium Award under Persons of Indian Origin Conclave-Invest in India. |
| 3 | Urban Development | 2008 | Citizen Extraordinary Award-2008 for contribution in introducing innovative changes in Bangalore. |
| 4 | General Administration | 2009 | Prime Minister's Award for Excellence in Public Administration. |

Other awards that recognise his abilities are – Extra-Ordinary Citizens’ Award from Rotary International (2008), Central Board of Irrigation and Power Award for outstanding contribution to India's Renewable Energy Sector (2016), 10th Enertia Life Time Achievement Award (2016) and UBM (2016) as Crusader of the year for Renewable Energy.

== See also ==
- Ministry of New and Renewable Energy
- Piyush Goyal
- Indian Administrative Services
- Karnataka
