= Board of Secondary Education, Odisha =

Educational agency in India

Coordinates: 20.468°N 85.886°E

- ମାଧ୍ୟମିକ ଶିକ୍ଷା ପରିଷଦ, ଓଡ଼ିଶା

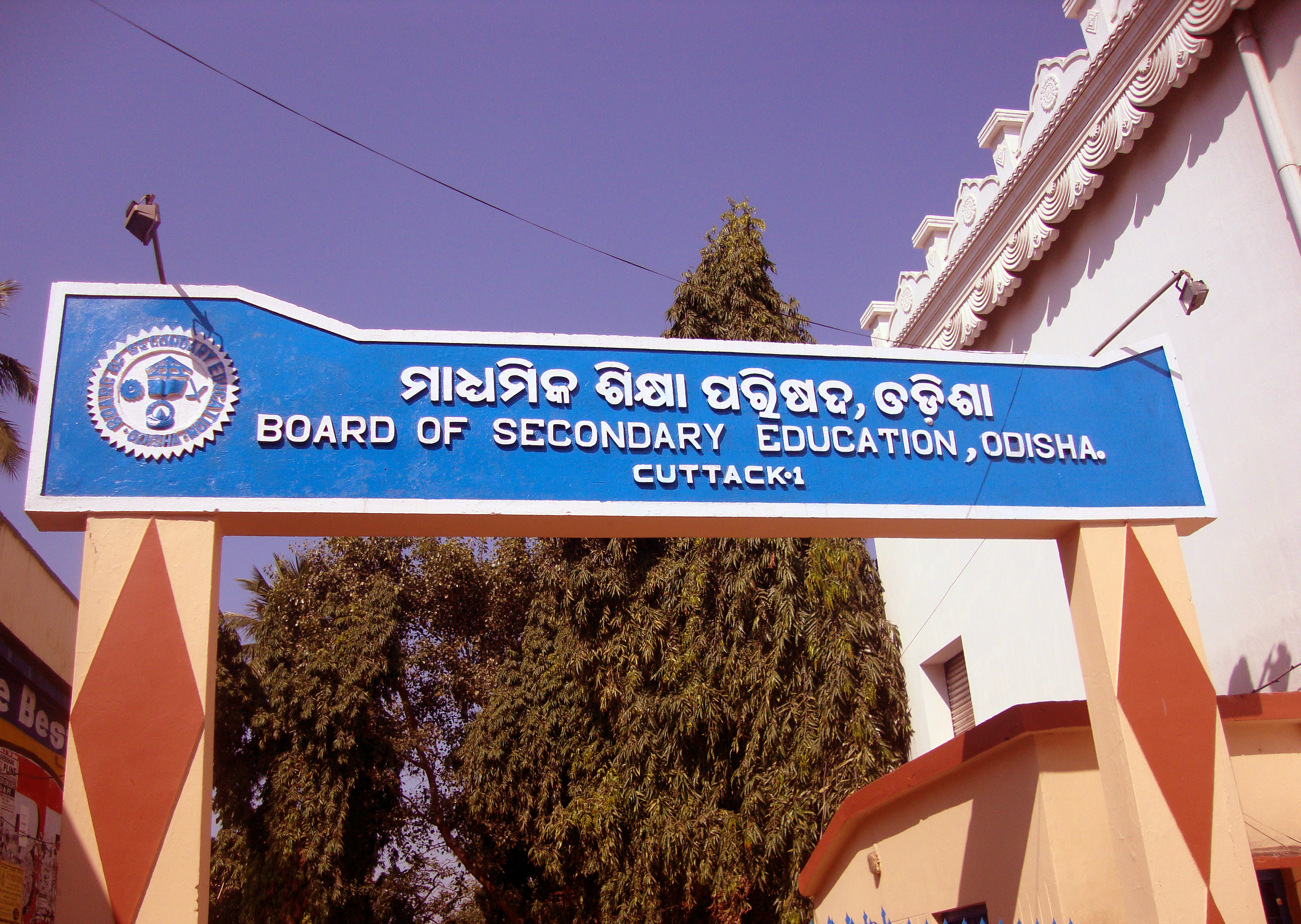
- Entrance Gate of BSE Headquarter
- Nickname: B.S.E., Odisha
- Formation: November 3, 1994
- Type: State Governmental
- Headquarters: Bajrakabati Road, Cuttack, Odisha, India
- Official language: Odia & English
- President: Srikant Tarai, OAS (SS)
- Vice President: Dr. Nihar Ranjan Mohanty, OES (SAG)
- Secretary: Manjulata Mallik
- Minister: Nityananda Gond
- Parent organisation: Department of School and Mass Education, Government of Odisha
- Website: www.bseodisha.ac.in

The Board of Secondary Education, Odisha (abbreviated B.S.E) is a board of education for government, public and private schools under the state government of Odisha, India.

== History ==
The B.S.E was formed under the Odisha Education Act 1953. The board controls and maintains all the necessary secondary education in the state of Odisha. Under this board, various courses are offered to students for different occupations and to prepare the students for university.

== Affiliations ==
The B.S.E affiliates all state schools, private schools and colleges in the state of Odisha. It also established and manages the Secondary Board High School, Cuttack as a model high school. This school shares the same campus as B.S.E's head office at Cuttack.

== Regional offices ==
In addition to the central zonal offices in Cuttack, there are 6 branch offices at Bhubaneswar, Balasore, Baripada, Berhampur, Jeypore and Sambalpur. The revenue district under its jurisdiction includes offices situated at Jajpur, Jagatsinghpur, Kendrapara, Dhenkanal, Angul, Puri, Khurda, Nayagarh, Balasore, Bhadrak, Mayurbhanj, Keonjhar, Ganjam, Kandhamal Gajapati, Boudh, Koraput, Nowrangpur, Malkanagir, Rayagada, Sundargarh, Sambalpur, Jharsuguda, Deogarh, Baragarh, Bolangir, Sonepur, Kalahandi and Nuapada.

== See also ==
- Department of Higher Education, Odisha
- Council of Higher Secondary Education, Odisha
