= Secondary Board High School, Cuttack =

- ସେକେଣ୍ଡାରୀ ବୋର୍ଡ଼ ହାଇସ୍କୁଲ, କଟକ
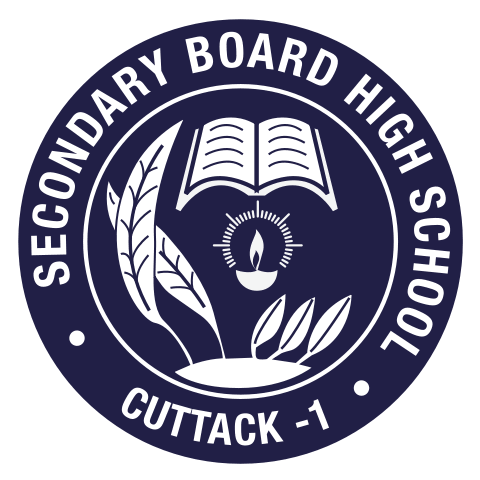

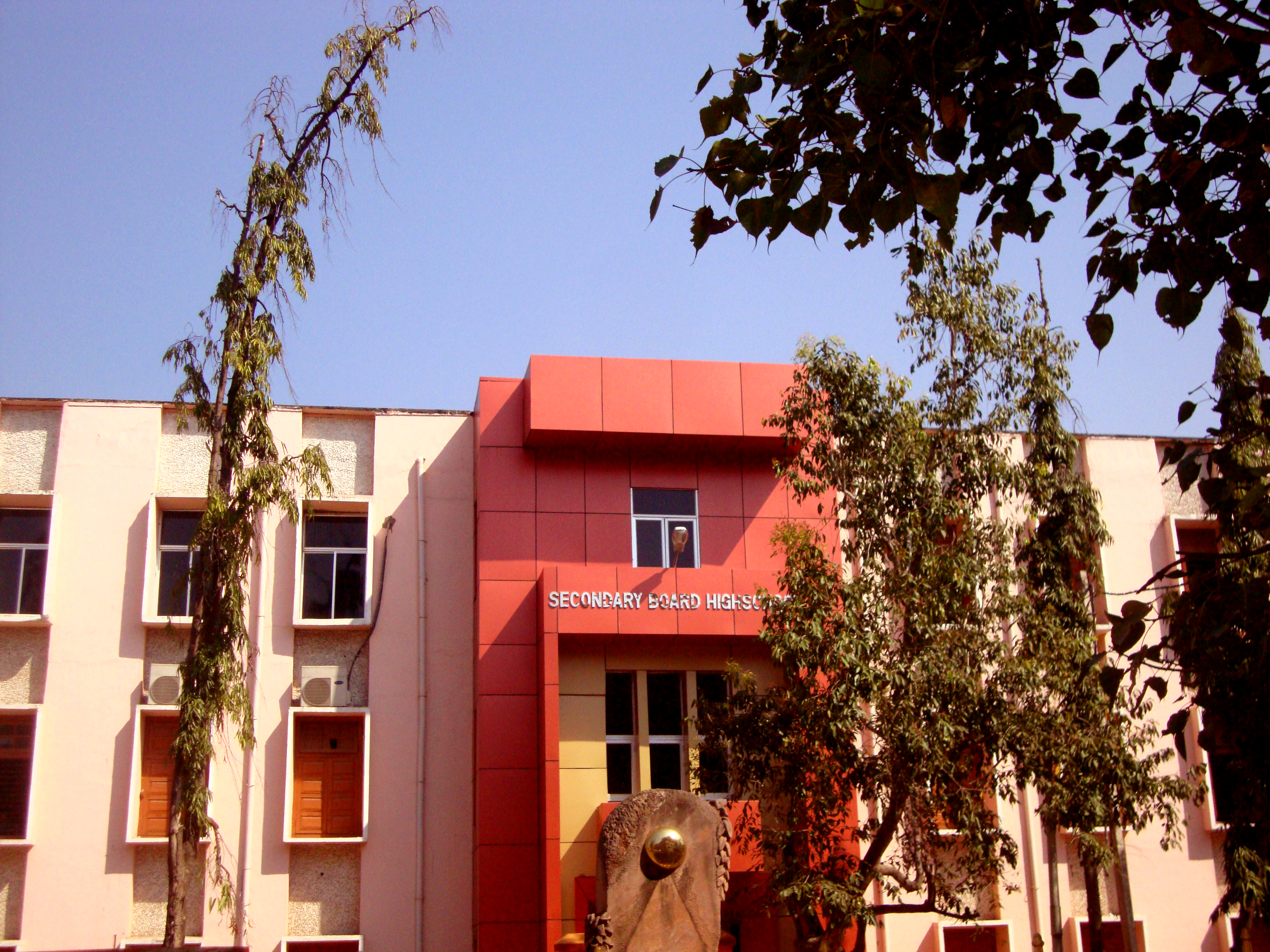

Location
- Secondary Board High School; Cuttack, Odisha, 753001; India; 20.46787°N 85.88657°E

Information
- School type: Public high school High School
- Motto: We provide Education.
- Established: 3 August 1959 (67 years ago)
- School district: Cuttack
- Principal: Ashok Kumar Satpathy
- Staff: 50+
- Grades: Classes 6 – 10
- Enrollment: 1,000+
- Language: Odia language & English
- Hours in school day: 9:00AM -5:00PM
- Campus type: Urban
- Sports: Cricket, football
- Nickname: S. B. H. S.
- Publication: THE KISALAYA
- Affiliation: Board of Secondary Education, Odisha
- Website: https://www.secondaryboardhighschoolctc.co.in/

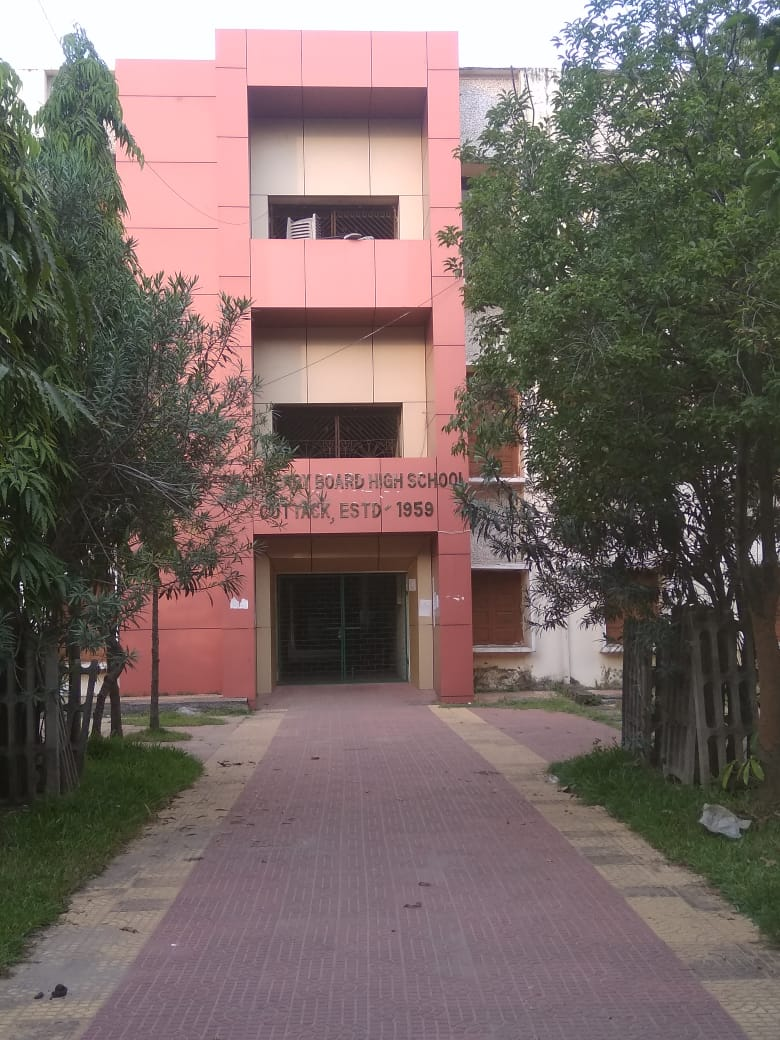
Secondary Board High School

The Secondary Board High School, Cuttack is an Indian Government high school in Cuttack, Odisha. It is situated at the Bajrakabati Road of Cuttack on the same campus as the Board of Secondary Education, Odisha (BSE). Established in 1959 by the BSE, the school was created as a model high school for imparting education in the Odisha state board system. The school has classes only from Std VI to X.

On 3 August 2009, this school celebrated its golden jubilee.

== History ==
In 1952–53, the Mudaliar Commission's report on Reform in the System of Secondary Education in India suggested a vast set of reforms for the education system. At that time, the educationists-cum-policy makers for Odisha, e.g., Professor B. C. Das, DPI; Shree H. Mishra, DDPI; Dr. S. Sahu, and senior officials of the BSE conceived an idea to establish three model schools at Cuttack, Sambalpur and Berhampur, respectively.

Under this initiative, construction of a school, named Secondary Board High School, began at Cuttack in 1958. The school opened on 3 August 1959 with 148 students (including 31 girls), under the guidance of Shree Chakradhar Mohanty, deputed by the BSE as special officer, and nine teachers.

It was initially planned to have only three classes, i.e., VI, VII and VIII, and accordingly, admission process began on 9 June 1959 starting with Class-VI. On demand by local guardians, classes IX and X were introduced later. The first batch passed the HSC Examination in 1962 with three years of study in the school, the fully trained first batch passed out in 1965 with all six years of study in the school.

Gradually the strength of students grew up to 1,100 by 1984.

== Campus and buildings ==
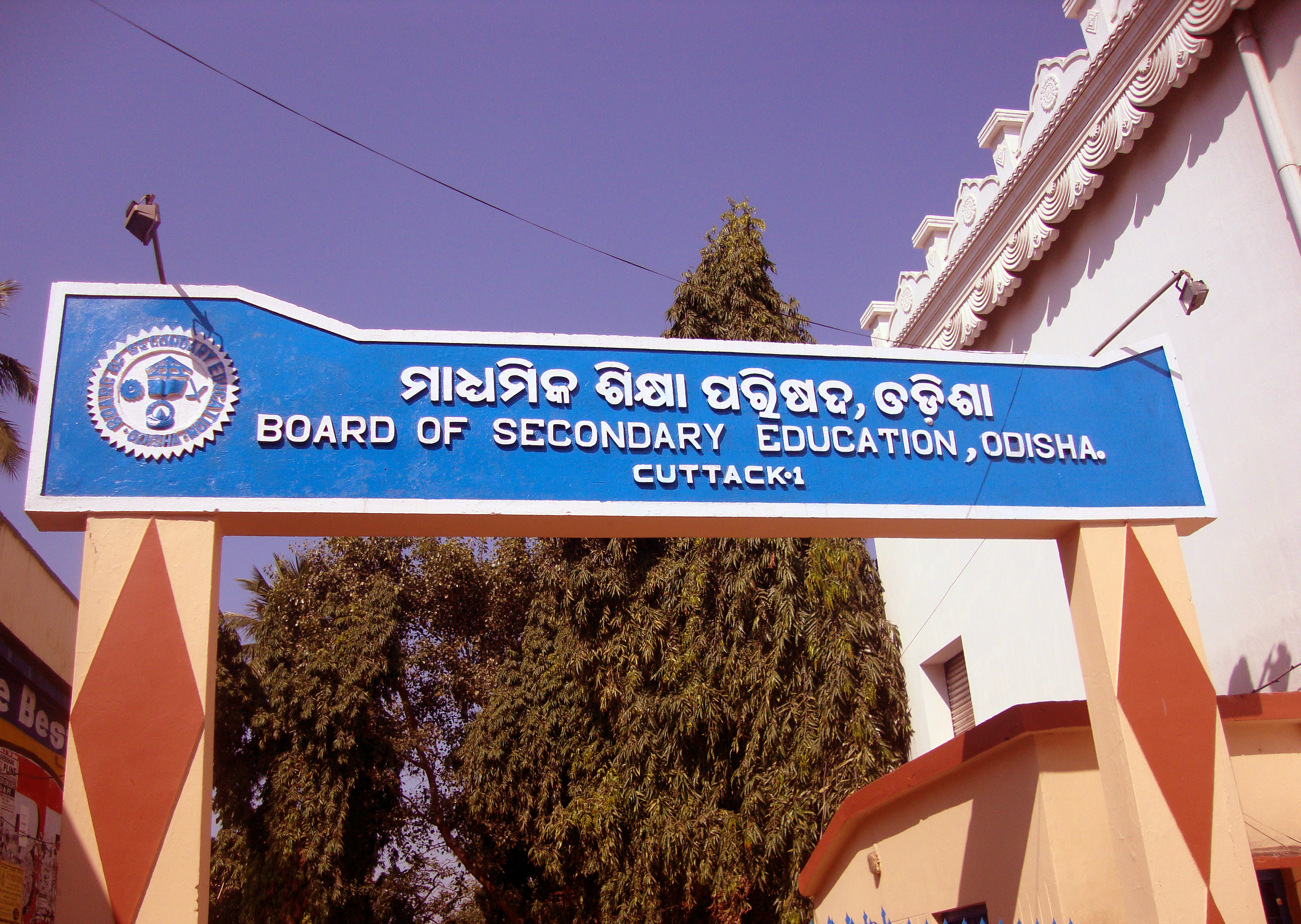
Main entrance of the school

The school shares the same campus as the BCE and the two buildings stand facing each other. Although the campus has a gate at the entrance on Bajrakabati Road, there is no clear demarcation or boundary walls for the entire campus.

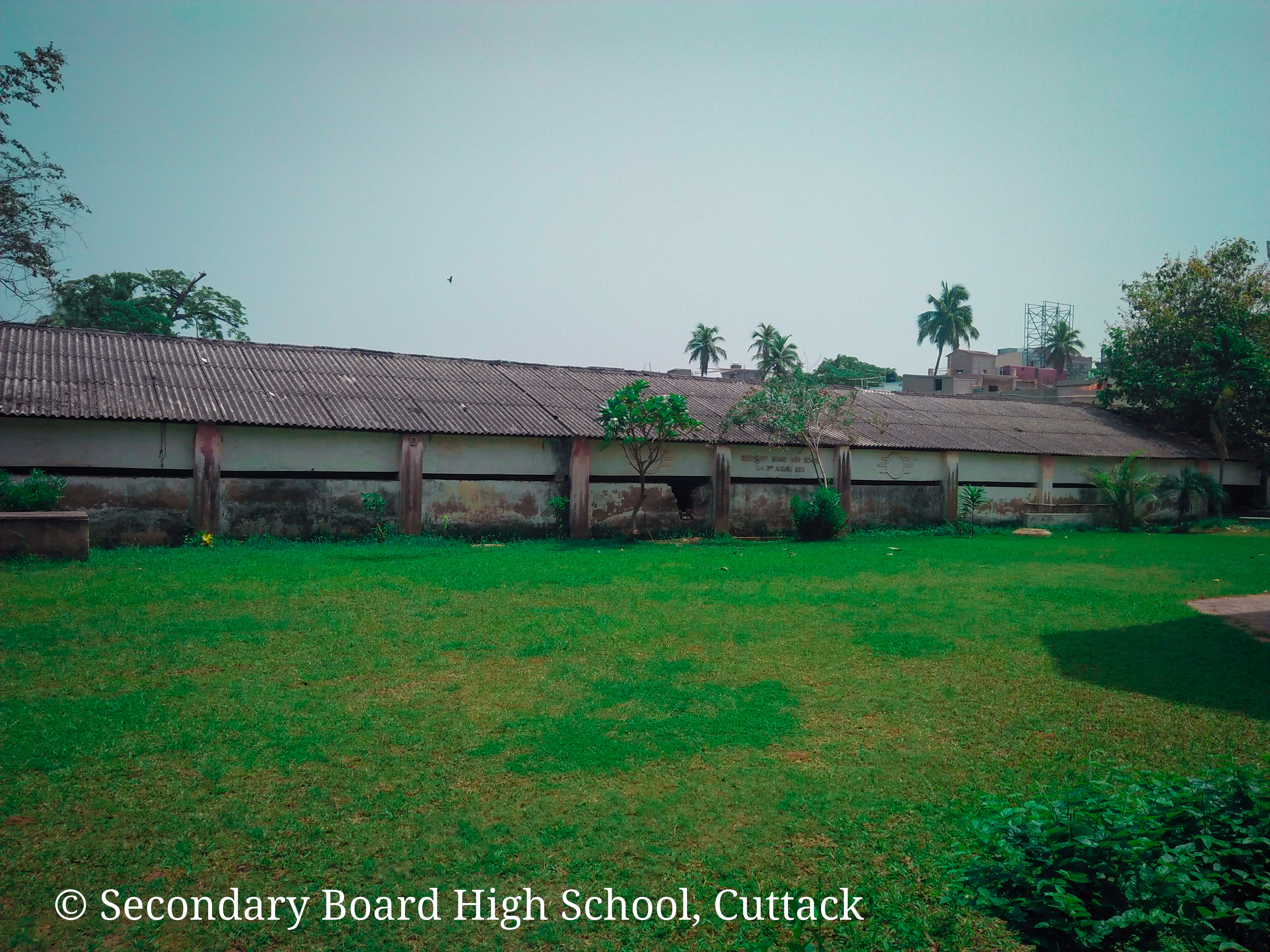
Lawn Of Secondary Board High School, Cuttack

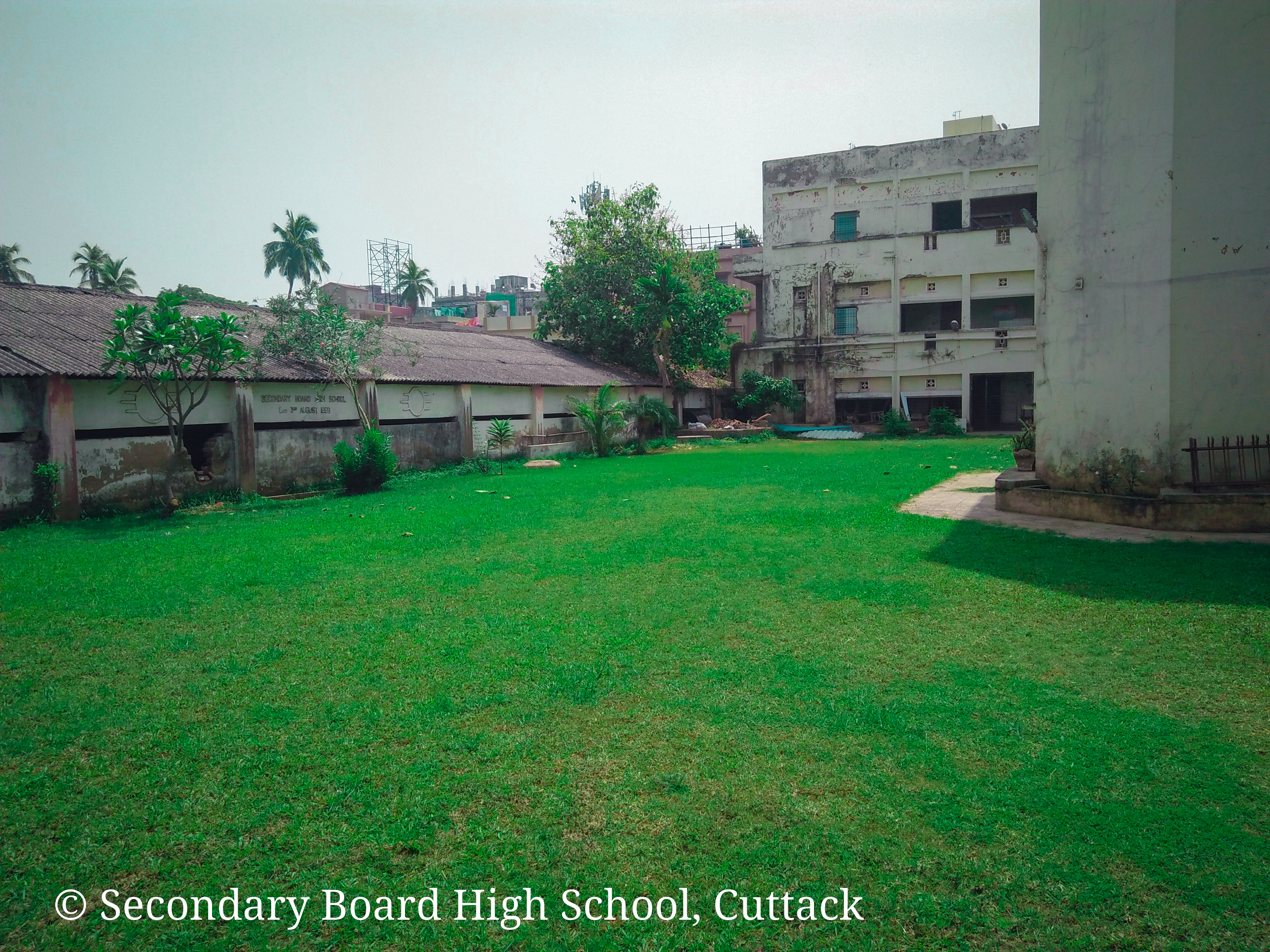
Lawn Of Secondary Board High School, Cuttack

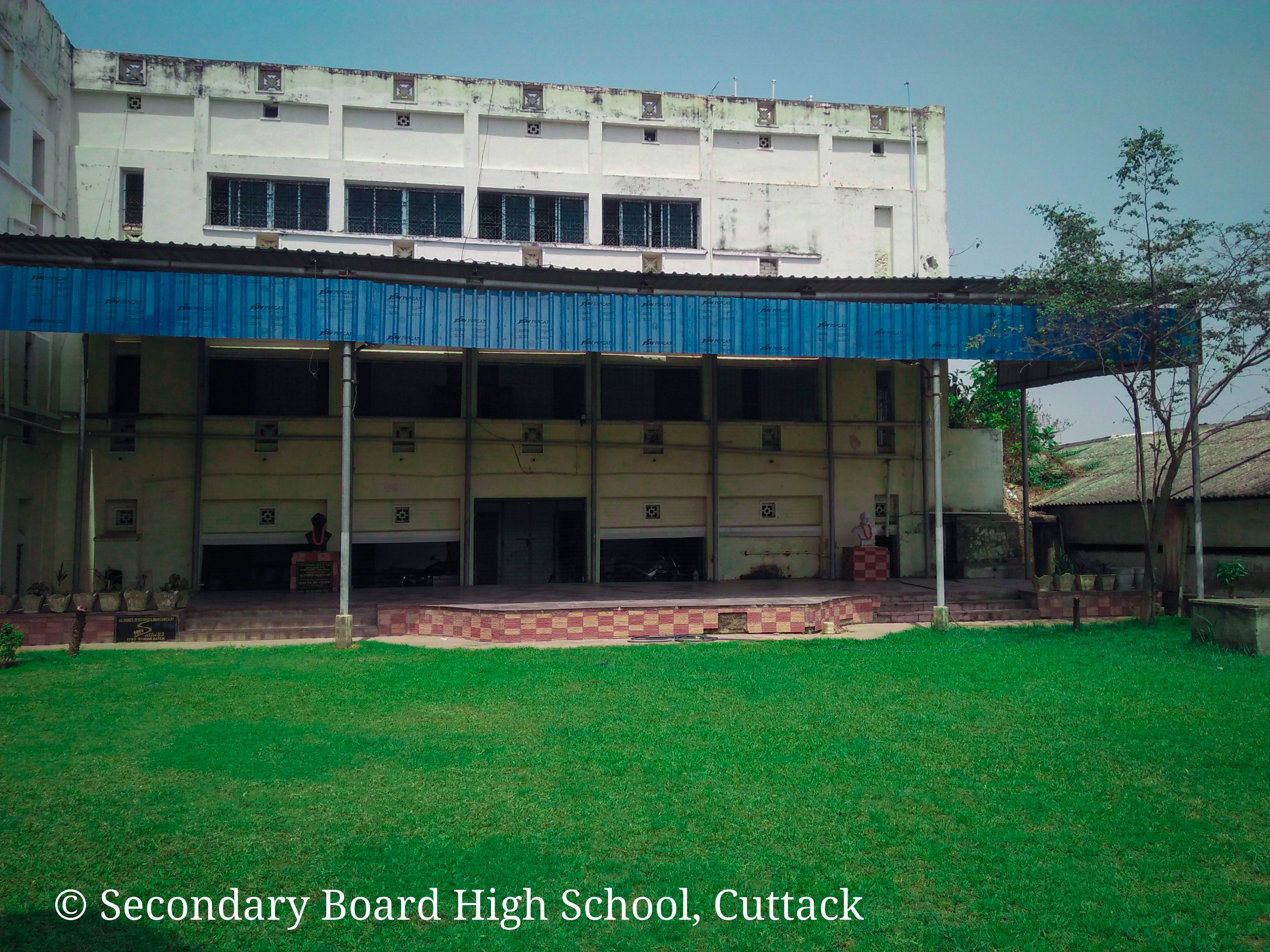
Lawn Of Secondary Board High School, Cuttack

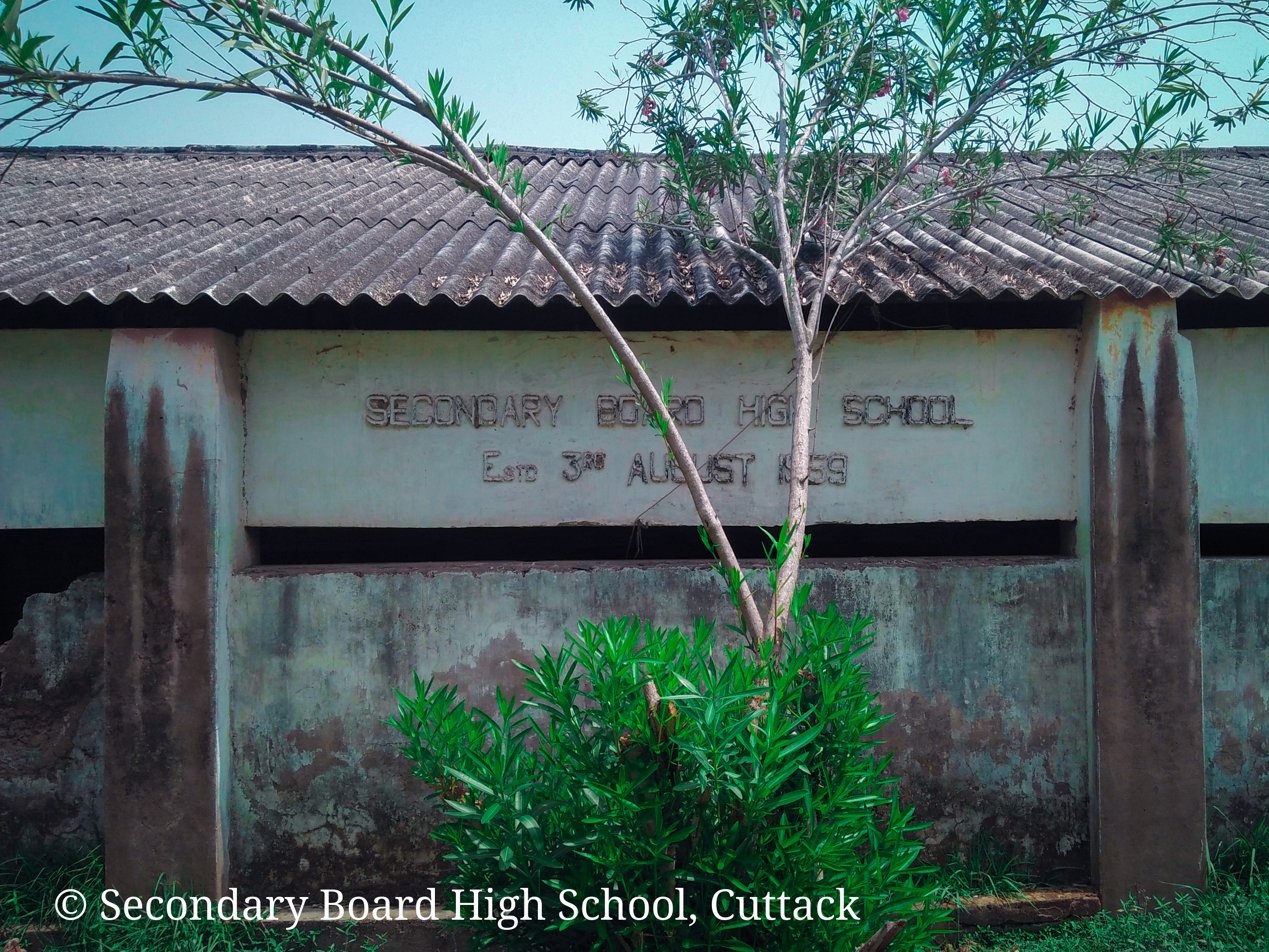
The school where it first started

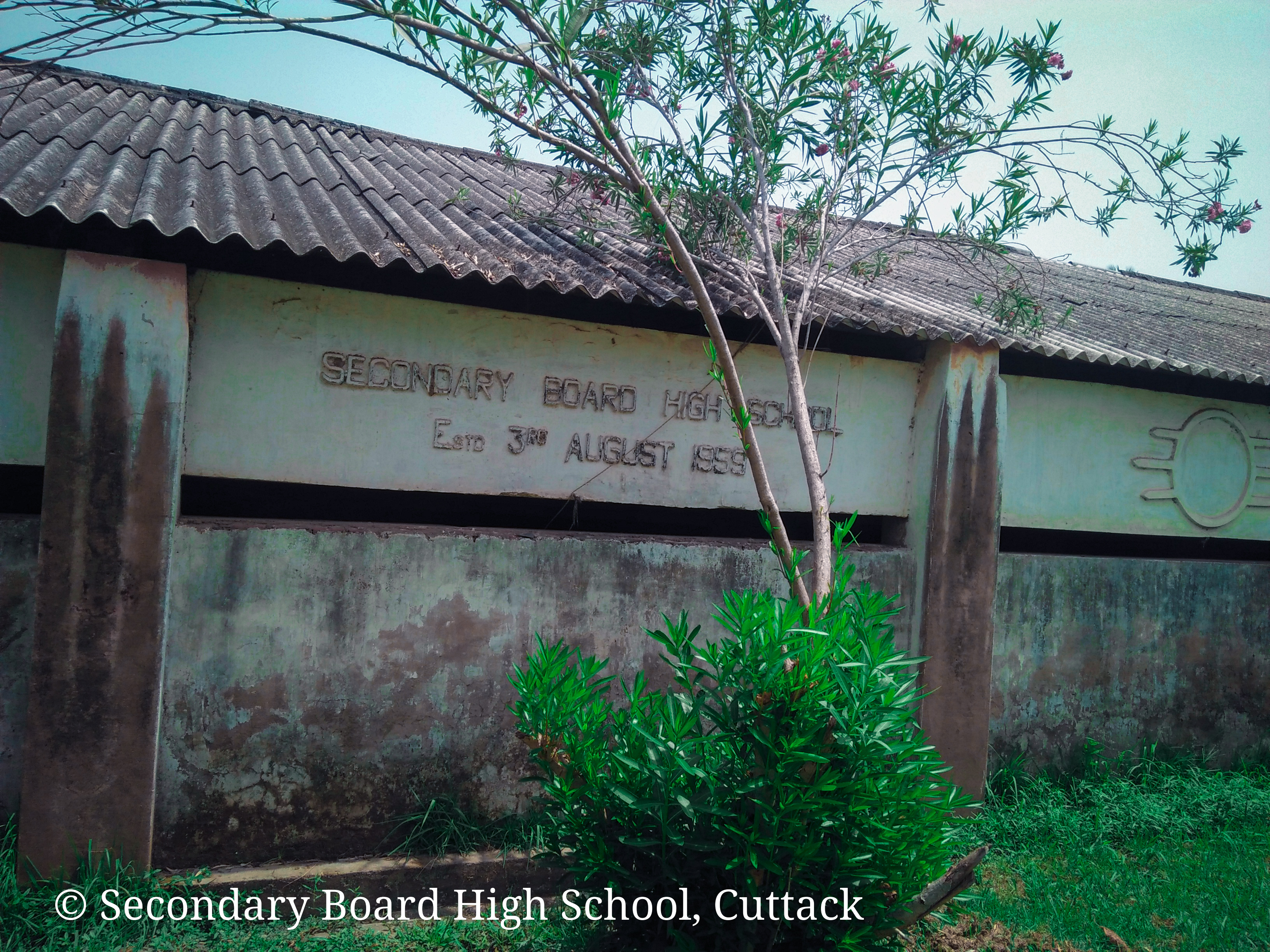
The School where it first started In 1959

== Notable alumni ==
- Sri Pratap Jena, Indian politician and Cabinet Minister

== Adopters ==
Sri Pratap Jena

== N.C.C. ==
N.C.C. or National Cadet Corps has been with the school since its founding days. Pupils from class VIII and IX are allowed to join NCC. Secondary Board High School, Cuttack was one of the first schools to have 1(Odisha)Air Squadron wing of NCC. Upon successful completion, students are given NCC 'A' Certificates.

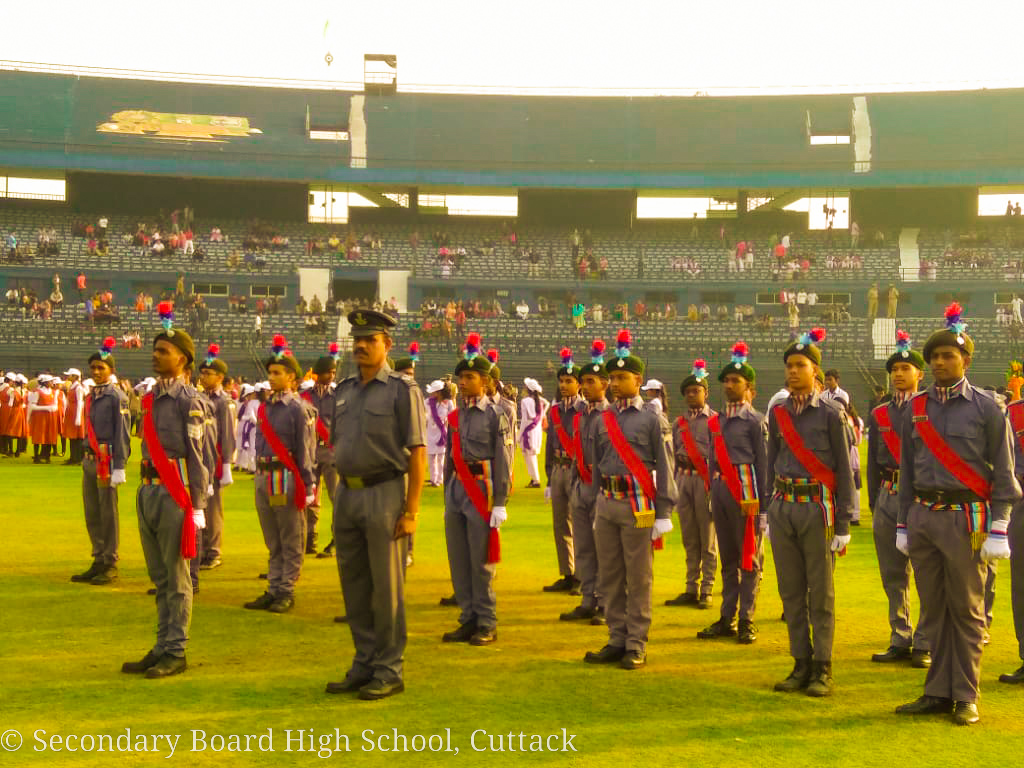

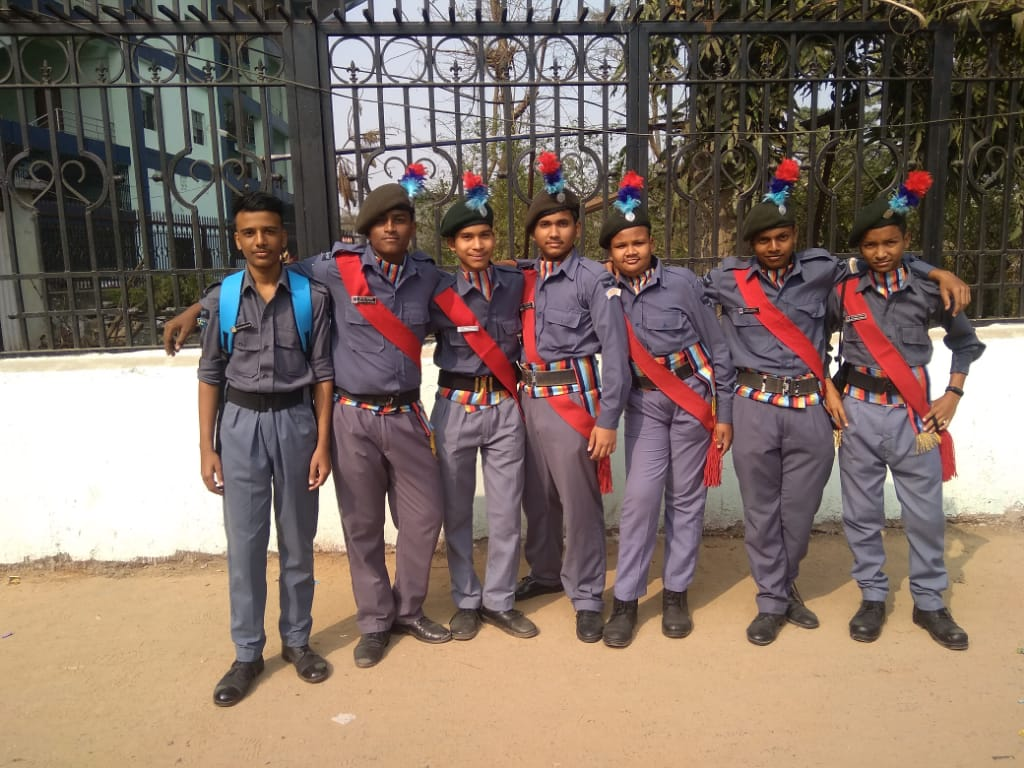
NCC Photo Secondary Board High School, Cuttack

== See also ==
- Education in Odisha
- List of schools in Odisha
