= Kulamani Parida =

Indian chemical scientist (born 1952)

Prof. K. M. Parida
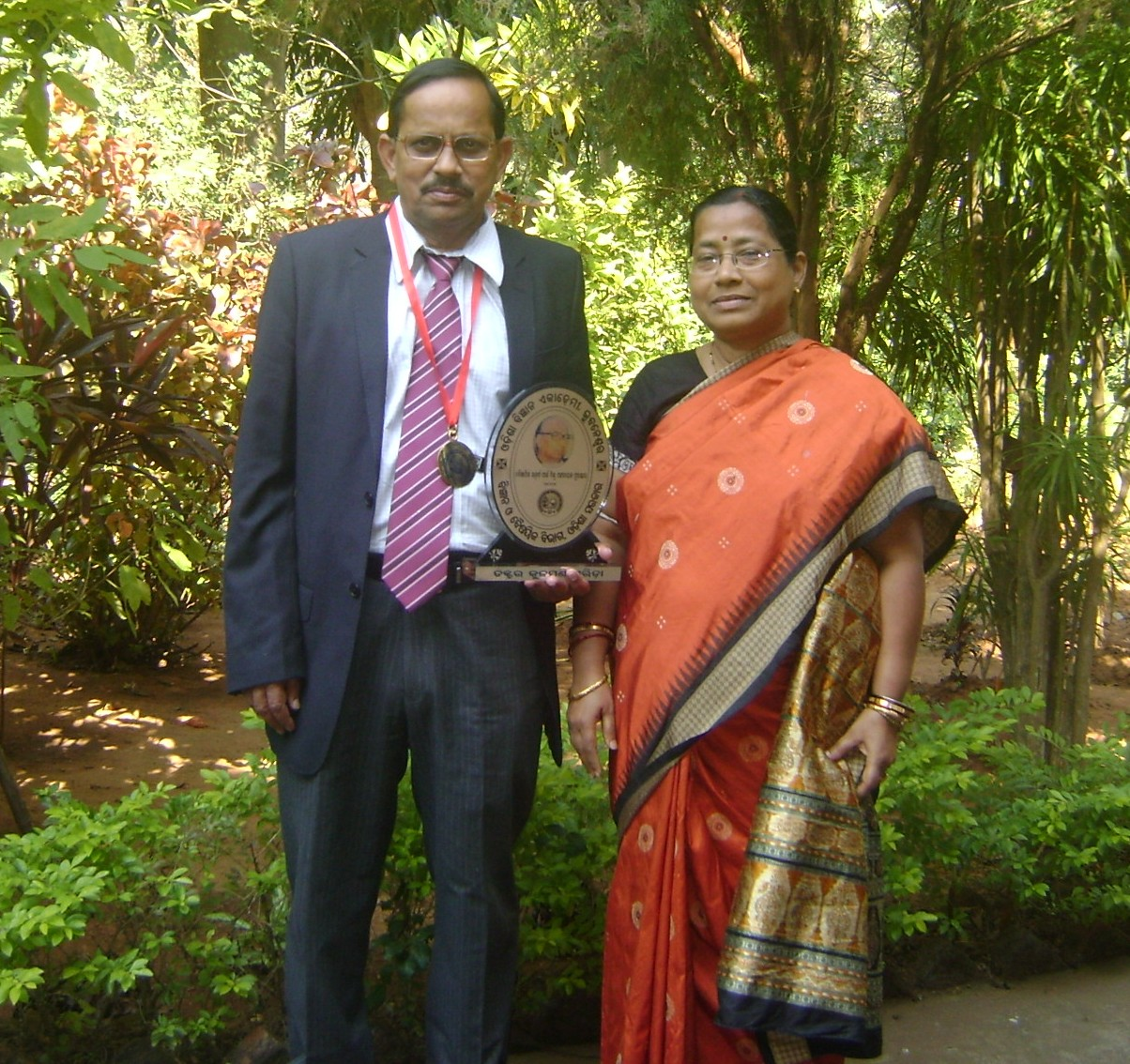
- Bijupattanaik Award with Ms. Parida
- Born: 9 May 1952 (age 74); India
- Education: Institute of Minerals and Materials Technology, Bhubaneswar (Previously known as Regional Research Laboratory)
- Occupation: Material Chemistry Scientist
- Years active: 1980 to present
- Spouse: Ms. Renubala Parida
- Scientific career
- Known for: In Depth research in Material chemistry for Energy and Environment
- Fields: Chemistry
- Workplaces: Siksha 'O' Anusandhan, Deemed to be University, Bhubaneswar. Institute of Minerals and Materials Technology, Bhubaneswar

Professor Kulamani Parida, also known as K. M. Parida (born 9 May 1952) is an Indian chemical science professor and scientist best known for his work and research, mainly on material chemistry. Parida is amongst World’s Top 2% Scientist 2020 with global rank 109 in Inorganic Chemistry ( Ranking based on C-score) and Rank 1 in the area of photocatalysis in India and 131 rank in the world based on Scopus author profile during 2016-2021. He has won 19 state and national level scientific awards, and authored around 521 research articles, and 10 book chapters. Parida has also more than 38 national scientific patents. Parida has also an outstanding google scholar citation index with citations of more than ~32316, h-index ~98, and i10-index ~444.

== Early life and education ==
Born and brought up in Kendrapara district of Odisha, Parida completed his schooling in Jayaram High school of Karilopatna (1969) and bachelor's degree in chemistry from Kendrapara Autonomous College. After completion of master's degree from Berhempur University, Parida joined as Research scholar in Regional Research Laboratory. During this period Parida married his colleague Ms. Renubala Parida.

== Scientific career ==
In his early research career, Parida has served as materials chemistry scientist in various departments of Institute of Minerals and Materials Technology Bhubaneswar (Previously known as Regional Research Laboratory, Bhubaneswar), Where he retired as Chief Scientist on 31.05.2014. Currently Parida is serving as Professor in chemistry and Director of Centre for Nano Science and Nano Technology department of Siksha 'O' Anusandhan University, Bhubaneswar. Parida also has served as active board member of scientific journals like “The Open Catalysis Journal” and “Bulletin of the Catalysis Society of India”.

== Scientific contribution ==
Parida has made significant scientific input towards discovery of the chemistry related to physicochemical, opto-electronic and photoelectrochemical properties of semiconducting materials for efficient visible photon induced water redox reaction, pollutant abatement and fine chemical synthesis. His research towards architectural development of advance systems with remarkable charge separation, photocurrent and conversion efficiency is exceptional.

== Awards and honours ==
Parida has received scientific awards and honours including

- MRSI Annual Prizes award (2022),
- Prof. S. K. Bhattacharyya Endoment Eminent Scientist Award (2017),
- Dai-Ichi Karkaria Endowment Fellowship (2014),
- MRSI Medal (2013),
- Certificate of Excellence by IMMT (2010),
- Ukieri Research Award (2009),
- SGAT Award of Excellence (2007),
- Metallurgist of the Year Award (2004),
- Nilamani Devi-Bishwanath Das Award (2003),
- Samanta Chandra Sekhar Award (2001),
- Prof. Dayanidhi Pattnaik Award (1998),
- Ferroguard Award (1985–86).

Parida also received an award, the Biju Patnaik Award for Scientific Excellence (2008) from Odisha Bigyan Academy and received a Senior DAAD Fellowship (1999), INSA Fellowship (2000 & 2010) and Royal Society Fellowship (2004 and 2008).
