= Samanta (disambiguation) =

Samanta is a title used in medieval India.

Samanta may also refer to:

== People ==
=== First name ===
- Samanta Bardini (born 1977), Italian softball player
- Samanta Fabris (born 1992) Croatian professional volleyball player
- Samanta Karavella (born 1990), Albanian singer and songwriter
- Samanta Lal Sen (born 1949), Bangladeshi physician
- Samanta Schweblin (born 1978), Argentine author
- Samanta Soares (born 1993), Brazilian judoka
- Samanta Tīna (born 1989), Latvian singer and songwriter
- Samanta Villar (born 1975), Spanish journalist

=== Surname ===
- Achyuta Samanta (born 1965), Indian educationist, social worker, and politician
- Ashim Samanta, Indian film and television director and producer
- Iti Rani Samanta (born 1970), Indian columnist, journalist, and film producer
- Pathani Samanta (1835–1904), Indian astronomer, mathematician, and scholar
- Pradeep Bal Samanta, Indian politician
- Shakti Samanta (1926–2009), Indian film director and producer
- Swadesh Chandra Samanta (born 1962), Bangladeshi agronomist

== Places ==
- Pathani Samanta Planetarium, a planetarium in Bhubaneswar, India
- Samanta Roy Institute of Science and Technology, fundamentalist Christian sect
- Satish Samanta Halt railway station, railway station in West Bengal, India

== Others ==
- Samantan or Samanta and Samantha, an Indian caste
- Jai Bharat Samanta Party, Indian political party
- Rashtriya Samanta Dal, Indian political party

== See also ==
- Samantha (disambiguation)
