= Sanghamitra Mohanty =

Indian computer scientist (1953–2021)

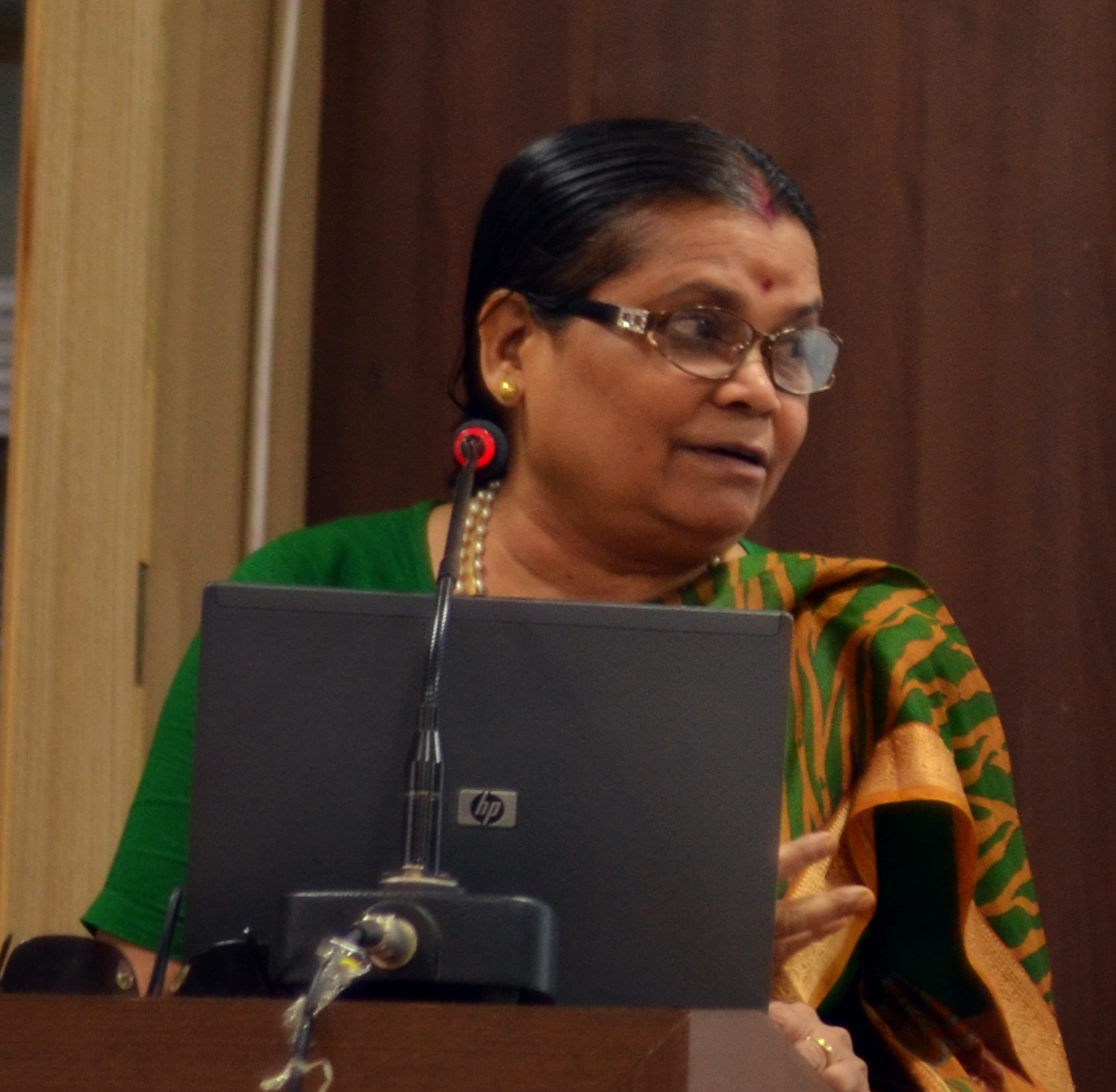
- Born: 1 April 1953; Cuttack, India
- Died: 1 July 2021 (aged 68); Bhubaneswar, India

Sanghamitra Mohanty (1 April 1953 – 1 July 2021) was an Indian computer scientist. She had a M.Sc. and Ph.D. in physics. She worked as a lecturer, reader and professor in computer science at Utkal University from 1986 to 2011. She was born in Cuttack, Odisha.

== Research ==
Mohanty did research in the fields of artificial intelligence, speech processing, image processing, natural language processing, fractal geometry, weather prediction, and high energy physics. Mohanty had thirteen Intellectual Property Rights (IPRs) on Indian Language Technology Solutions. More than 160 of her research papers were published in international journals and conference proceedings. She visited a number of institutions in India and abroad for academic collaboration and research.

== Awards and fellowships ==
She was the recipient of the Samanta Chandrashekhar Award of Odisha Bigyan Academy of Science and Technology Department, Government of Odisha for her contribution to engineering and technology in 2012. She was a Fellow of the Women's Engineering Society of United Kingdom (FWES). Mohanty was the Vice Chancellor of North Orissa University during 2011 to 2014. She was the President of Odisha Bigyan Academy starting in January 2016.

Mohanty died from COVID-19 in 2021.
