= Umesh =

- Pronunciation: uu - m ai sh
- Gender: Male

Origin
- Languages: Sanskrit, Hindi, Odia, Marathi, Bengali, Konkani
- Meaning: Lord Shiva, Lord of Uma
- Region of origin: India

Umesh is an Indian given name. Notable people with the name include: * M. S. Umesh, actor

- Umesh Chandra Banerjee, jurist
- Umesh Chandra Patra, zoologist
- Umesh Harijan, footballer
- Umesh Kamat, actor
- Umesh Kulkarni (cricketer), cricketer
- Umesh Mehra, film director
- Umesh Parag, hockey player
- Umesh Reddy, serial rapist and serial killer
- Umesh Shukla, film director
- Umesh Upadhyay, television executive
- Umesh Valjee, cricketer
- Umesh Vazirani, computer scientist
- Umesh Vinayak Kulkarni, Marathi film director
- Umesh Waghmare, material scientist
