= Arati Devi =

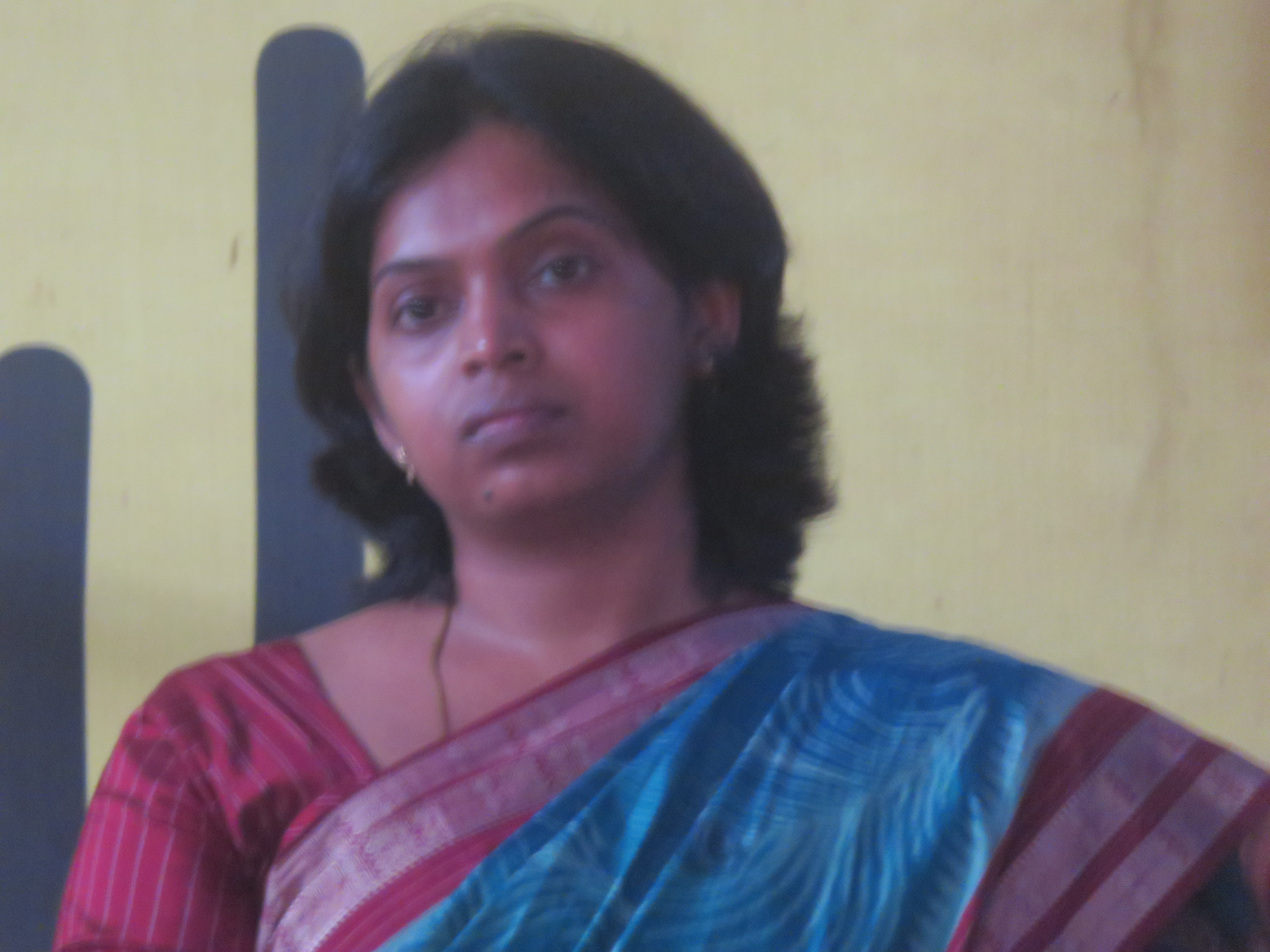
- Arati Devi
- Born: Ganjam, Odisha India
- Education: Behrampur University
- Occupation: Government Service
- Relatives: Father - Bhaskar Bhuyan

Arati Devi is India's youngest elected sarpanch from Dhunkapada Gram Panchayat in Ganjam district, Odisha.

== Early life ==
Devi was brought up in Ganjam district and her initial schooling was from this small district in Odisha.

Devi's maternal grandparents were freedom fighters and she draws her inspiration from them to work towards the poor and needy. She pursued graduation in History from Behrampur University. She did her MBA from Sikkim Manipal University before plunging into full-time public service.

== Career ==
Devi started her career working for a bank.

In 2012, Devi quit her job as an investment officer at IDBI Bank, Behrampur to become a sarpanch, the elected head of a village-level statutory institution of local self-government, called a panchayat. In 2014, Devi was invited to participate in three week international leadership program in the US. This was under the Obama government when she was the only Indian selected for the International Visitors Leadership Program (IVLP) on state and local governments for current and emerging leaders sponsored by the State Department.

In 2014, Devi was nominated for the Rajiv Gandhi Leadership Award 2014.

== Notable work ==
Devi has been able to improve village-level governance and streamline the Public Distribution System (PDS) in the village. She also started a literacy campaign for the women so that they were able to sign instead of using thumb impressions and write their applications. She has also been pivotal in reviving the traditional folk art troupes of her village.
