= Govind J. Chakrapani =

Prof. Govind J. Chakrapani is an Indian geologist, environmental scientist, and academic administrator, and was Vice Chancellor of Berhampur University in Odisha, India, during 2019 to 2022. He joined as an Assistant Professor in the Department of Earth Sciences at IIT Roorkee in 1996 and became Professor in 2008. He was the Dean at the School of Ecology & Environment Studies and the Officiating Dean at the School of Buddhist Studies Nalanda University, Ministry of External Affairs, India during 2017-18.

== Early life and education ==
Prof. Chakrapani did school education in Odisha. and obtained B.Sc. in Geology with Honours from Berhampur University, M.Sc. in Applied Geology from IIT Bombay and, M.Phil. and PhD in Environmental Geochemistry from Jawaharlal Nehru University, Delhi.

== Career ==
Following completion of PhD, he was a post-Doc in USA at the College of Marine Studies at the University of Delaware and was a CSIR Pool Officer at JNU and IIT Bombay before joining as a faculty at the erstwhile University of Roorkee (converted to Indian Institute of Technology in 2001) in 1996. In addition to his research and academic responsibilities, Prof. Chakrapani served as the Dean of the School of Ecology & Environment Studies and the Officiating Dean at the School of Buddhist Studies, Nalanda University during 2017-18. He also served as the Finance Officer-In-Charge and as the Director of the Unnat Bharat Abhiyan during his time there. He was the Organizing Chairman of GATE in 2017, Chairman of GATE in 2015, 2016 and 2017, and Chairman of JAM in 2015, 2016 and 2017. He served as the Vice Chancellor of Berhampur University in Odisha during 2019-22.

He has also been associated with numerous advisory and expert committees of Government of India, such as, Chairman, Expert Appraisal Committee on River Valley and Hydropower projects, Chairman of Uttarakhand State Environment Expert Appraisal Committee, State Environmental Impact Assessment Authority, Quality Council of India, IITs and Universities, IISERs, UPSC, CSIR etc. He visited and worked at several universities and institutes in India, USA, France, Germany, Sweden, China, Japan, UK, Taiwan, Australia etc.

== Research ==
His research interests include low-temperature geochemistry, aquatic environment of rivers & lakes, urban hydrogeology, rock-water-air interaction, environmental impact assessment & management, water and energy policy and governance. He has published studies related to environmental processes in rivers, organic geochemistry in Himalayan lakes and urban hydrogeology. His research group used tools such as, geochemistry, isotopic signatures, neural network etc. to understand earth surface processes. The studies on Himalayan rivers established the significant role of Himalayan catchment and seasonal variations for large scale changes in chemical weathering rates. In a first ever study in India, laboratory experiments were carried out to understand the dissolution rates of rocks/minerals in simulated conditions, which assume significance for the release of trace elements from rocks/minerals, triggering of landslides, suitable repositories for nuclear waste disposal etc. In a significant study, his research collaborators estimated and validated the impact of Deccan Traps erosion on global climate and silicate weathering and carbon dioxide sequestration in western ghat region and Ganga river basin. Other significant research includes studies on the daily and decadal variations and factors controlling dissolved and sediment flux by the Narmada and the Mahanadi rivers that showed precise water discharge and sediment flux to the Arabian Sea and Bay of Bengal respectively.

== Honours ==
In recognition of his academic contributions, he was rated a Star Performer at IIT Roorkee in 2003-04 and 2005-06 and was felicitated in 2017 for bringing laurels to the Institute. He was awarded the National Geosciences (Mineral) Award by the Government of India in 2005). He was elected Fellow of the National Academy of Sciences in India (FNASc) in 2012.
