= Samantha (disambiguation) =

Samantha is a female given name.

Samantha may also refer to:

== Places ==
- Samantha, Alabama, an unincorporated community
- Samantha, Ohio, an unincorporated community
- 3147 Samantha, an asteroid

== Film and TV ==
- Samantha: An American Girl Holiday, TV movie based on the doll and book series
- Samantha (film), a 1992 American movie
- Samantha (TV series), a 1998 Venezuelan telenovela
- Samantha oups!, a 2004–2007 French television series, broadcast in Canada as Samantha
- Samantha!, a 2018 Netflix comedy series

== Music ==
- Samantha (album), a 2015 album by American artist Toro y Moi
- "Samantha" (Margaret Berger song), an electropop song by Norwegian singer Margaret Berger
- "Samantha" (Hole song), from the album Nobody's Daughter
- "Samantha" (Kaela Kimura song), a 2007 single by Japanese singer Kaela Kimura
- "Samantha" (Dave and J Hus song), a 2017 single by British rappers Dave and J Hus
- "Samantha", a 1961 song by Kenny Ball And His Jazz Band
- "Samantha", a 1964 song by Billy Strange
- "Samantha", a 1969 song by Axiom (band)
- "Samantha", a 1975 song by Crispian St. Peters
- "Samantha", a 1978 song by Digby Richards
- "Samantha", a 1980 song by David London
- "Samantha", a 1985 song by Madness (band)
- "Samantha", a 1988 song by Diesel (band)
- "Samantha", a 1998 song by Theatre of Tragedy

== People ==
- Samantha (singer), Belgian singer Christiane Bervoets (born 1948)
- Samantha Fox (American actress), stage name of American pornographic film and B movie actress Stasia Micula (1959-2020)
- Samantha Jones (singer), stage name of English former singer Jean Owen (born 1943)
- Samantha Ruth Prabhu, Indian actress (born 1987)
- Samantha Taylor, stage name of Canadian radio and television personality Myroslava Luciw (born 1958)

== Other uses ==
- Samantha, a 1967 novel by Howard Fast (as E.V. Cunningham)
- Samantan or Samanta and Samantha, an Indian caste

== See also ==
- Samanta (disambiguation)
