= Odisha Bigyan Academy =

Indian non-profit to advance science among the general public

- Established: 1 April 1981
- Location: Bhubaneswar, India
- President: Prof. Sanghamitra Mohanty
- Website: Official website

Odisha Bigyan Academy is a non-profit organisation in the Indian state of Odisha. It was established by professors and academics in science and technology to popularize scientific ideas and technological innovations among students and general public along with encouraging scientific research activities in the State under one umbrella. It encourages students to pursue science as a career and academics to excel in the field of science and engineering research.

== History ==
The academy was established on Odisha Day on 1 April 1981 and registered under the Registration of Societies Act. In 1985, the Government of Odisha recognized the Academy and its constitution via Resolution No. 3577/STE., dated 21/03/1985. It is under the administrative control of the Department of Science and Technology, Government of Odisha. The Academy has its office in the State capital, Bhubaneswar.

== Publications ==
The academy publishes two monthly publications: Bigyan Diganta in the Odia language and Science Horizon in English. The Academy publishes selected topics in a special issue of Bigyan Diganta magazine in Odia Braille to cater to the needs of visually impaired students. Scientists of different institutions are selected for the award from among the Odia scientists working in Odisha and outside Odisha.

== List of presidents ==
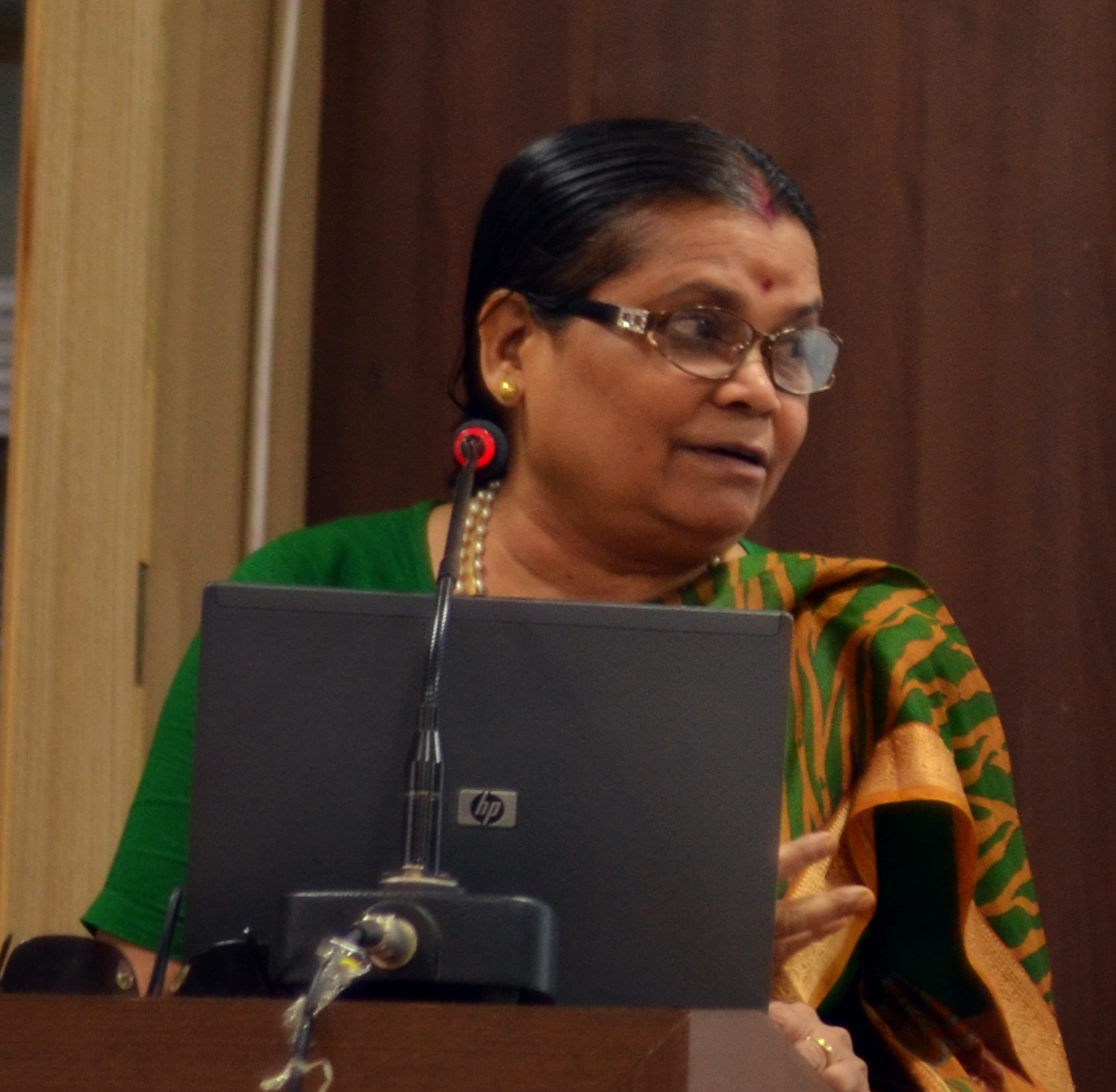
Current honorary president Sanghamitra Mohanty

The honorary presidents since 1985 have been:

1. Prof. Balabhadra Prasad, Ex-Principal, Ravenshaw College
2. Prof. P. K. Jena, Ex-Director, Regional Research Laboratory
3. Prof. Tribrikram Pati, Ex-Vice-Chancellor, Banaras Hindu University
4. Prof. Siba Prasad Misra, Ex-Professor, Institute of Physics, Bhubaneswar
5. Prof. Debakanta Mishra, Ex-Principal Ravenshaw College
6. Prof. Basudev Kar, Ex-Principal, Shriram Chandra Bhanja Medical College
7. Prof. Uma Charan Mohanty, Ex-Professor, Indian Institute of Technology Delhi
8. Prof. Sanghamitra Mohanty, Ex-Vice Chancellor, North Orissa University (current)

== Awards ==
The academy has been giving awards and felicitations to eminent and senior scientists of Odisha State every year since 1987.

=== Biju Patnaik Award for Scientific Excellence ===
List of recipients of the Biju Patnaik Award for Scientific Excellence
Year of award	Awardee	Address	Field of Research
2016	Dr. Digambar Behera	Postgraduate Institute of Medical Education and Research, Chandigarh	Medical Science
2015	Prof. Prasanta Mohapatra	University of California, Davis, USA	Engineering and Technology
2014	Prof. Lalit Mohan Das	Indian Institute of Technology, Delhi	Engineering and Technology
2013	Prof. Gadadhar Misra	Indian Institute of Science, Bangalore	Physical Science
2012	Prof. Ganapati Panda	Indian Institute of Technology, Bhubaneswar	Engineering and Technology
2011	Prof. Janardan Nanda	Indian Institute of Technology, Delhi	Engineering and Technology
2010	Prof. Pradipta Kishore Dash	Director, Multidisciplinary University, Bhubaneswar	Engineering and Technology
2009	Dr. Rajanikanta Choudhury	BARC, 66, Sriniketan, Anushaktinagar, Mumbai	Physical Science
2008	Dr. Kulamani Parida	Institute of Minerals and Materials Technology, Bhubaneswar	Physical Science
2007	Prof. Lalit Mohan Patanaik	Defence Inst. of Advanced Technology, Pune	Engineering and Technology
2007	Prof. Jananadeva Maharana	Institute of Physics, Bhubaneswar	Physical Science
2006	Prof. (Dr.) Dipika Mohanty	Institute of Immunohematology (ICMR), Mumbai	Medical Science

=== Samanta Chandra Sekhar Award ===
The Samanta Chandra Sekhar Award, named after astronomer Samanta Chandra Sekhar, is awarded for outstanding research contribution in science and technology.

=== Odisha Young Scientist Award ===
The Odisha Young Scientist Award is given for "outstanding research work" done by scientists under the age of 35 who were working inside the State of Orissa during the years preceding the year of award.

=== Pranakrushna Parija Popular Science Award ===
The Pranakrushna Parija Popular Science Award, named after Prana Krushna Parija, is given to writers who have popularized critical scientific concepts and technological innovations through publication of books in the Odia language.

== See also ==
- Indian National Academy of Engineering
- Indian National Science Academy
- Indian Academy of Sciences
- National Academy of Sciences, India
