= Jatin Das (painter) =

Indian painter (born 1941)

- Born: 2 December 1941 (age 84); Baripada, Mayurbhanj, Odisha, India
- Education: Sir J J School of Art, Bombay
- Known for: Painting, drawing, sculpture
- Awards: Padma Bhushan (2012)
- Website: www.jatindas.com//

Jatin Das (born 2 December 1941) is an Indian painter, sculptor and muralist. He is counted amongst the leading contemporary artists of India.

== Personal life and education ==
Jatin Das was born on 2 December 1941 in Baripada Mayurbhanj, Odisha, India. He studied at the Sir JJ School of Art, Bombay, under Professor S.B. Palsikar. His term at the school lasted for a period of five years, from 1957 to 1962. Thereafter, he started participating in the art exhibitions, both at the national as well as the international level. Some important exhibitions where he participated include the Biennales in Paris (1971), and in Venice (1978) and the Documenta in Kassel (1975).

Das was previously married to Varsha Das. He was married to Bidisha Roy Das. They have lived separately for years. Jatin has three children, including actress & filmmaker Nandita Das.

== Career ==
Jatin Das has been painting for 50 years. He has held over 68 one-man exhibitions. He has done several murals and sculpture installations. He works in oil, watercolour, ink, graphics and conté. His works now feature in several public and private collections. Jatin has built a large personal collection of traditional arts and crafts over the last 35 years.

== Awards ==
- Conferred Padma Bhushan by Govt. of India, January 2012
- Order of the Star of Italian Solidarity Italian Government, Italian President Award, New Delhi, 2007
- Bharat Nirman Award, 2007
- Seminar Management Institution, Bhubaneswar 2007
- Conferred the D.Litt. (Honoris Causa), Utkal University of Culture, Bhubaneswar on 8 May 2007
- Utkala Awards by Bengal Governor, Kolkata, 2006

== One-man shows (selected) ==
- The Artists Alley Gallery, San Francisco, USA, 2009
- Chelsea Arts Club, London, UK, 2009
- Visual Arts Gallery, India Habitat Centre, Delhi, India, 2009
- Jehangir Art Gallery, Presented by Art & Soul Gallery, Mumbai, 2007.
- AIFACS Gallery, Paintings done in Greece, Presented by ICCR, New Delhi 2007.
- CIMA Gallery, Kolkata: ‘Charged Figures’, 2007.
- Lalit Kala Akademi, Delhi: ‘Journeys across Foreign Lands,’ 2006.
- 1X1 Art Space, Dubai, 2006.
- Archaeological Museum, Thessaloniki, Greece, 2005.
- Retrospective, 40 years of drawings, All India Fine Arts Crafts Society (AIFACS), Delhi, 2002.
- National Gallery of Modern Art, Mumbai, 2002: Works on paper.
- New Delhi, Art Today (C.P.), 2001.
- Body Spirited, India Habitat Centre, Delhi, 1999.
- Crimson, The Art Resource, Karnataka Chitrakala Parishath, Bangalore 1996
- Bombay, Jehangir Art Gallery, ’95.
- A Retrospective: Government Museum and Art Gallery, Chandigarh, 1994.
- Heads, Le Corbousier Art Gallery, Alliance Française, Chandigarh, ’93.
- Mumbai, Women of Clay and other paintings, Cymroza Art Gallery, ’93.
- New Delhi, Tribhovandas Bhimji Zaveri Presentation, AIFACS, '92.
- Birla Academy of Art and Culture, Calcutta, 1986.
- New Delhi, Rabindra Bhavan Gallery, LKA Retrospective Show 1968–90, ITC '91
- Bombay, Jehangir Art Gallery, '87
- New Delhi, 'Times of India' Presentation. Shridharini Art Gallery '85
- Madras, Sarla Art Centre, '83
- Bombay, Taj Art Gallery, '82
- Baroda, Urja Art Gallery, '79
- Ahmedabad, Hutheesing Visual Art Centre, '79
- London, Arts 38 Gallery, '78
- New Delhi, Kumar Art Gallery, Hansalaya, '78
- West Germany, Werl. Pastorat a.d Johanniskirche, "Zeitgendessiche Ind., Kunst" '78
- West Germany, Frainsherm an der Weinstrasse, Surya Gallery '77
- New Delhi, Studio, Private Show, Drawings '77
- New Delhi, Kumar Art Gallery, '76
- Loughborough, UK, the Garden Gallery, '75.
- London, Commonwealth Institute Art Gallery, '75.
- City Museum and Art Gallery, Birmingham, UK, '75
- West Germany, West Berlin, Hotel Kempenski, '75.
- Schloss Bellevue, Kassel, West Germany, '75.
- West Germany, Frankfurt, Bharat Verein e.V., '75.
- Amsterdam, Gallery de Sfinx, '75.
- New Delhi, Shridharani Art Gallery, '74.
- New Delhi, Studio, Private Show, '74.
- Bombay, Pundole Art Gallery, '74.
- Bombay, Taj Art Gallery, '73.
- New Delhi, Kumar Art Gallery, '73.
- Bombay, Taj Art Gallery, '68.
- New Delhi, Kumar Art Gallery, '68.
- Orissa, Rourkela, Max Mueller Bhavan, '67.
- Bombay, Taj Art Gallery, '66.
- Goa, Panjim, Institute Menezes Braganza, '66.
- Bombay, Taj Art Gallery, '65.
- Calcutta, Gallery Chemould, '65.
- Bombay, Private Show, Alyque & Pearl Padamsee, '65.
- Orissa, Bhubaneshwar, Rabindra Mandap, '64.
- Bombay, Jehangir Art Gallery, '64.
- Bombay, Indo-American Society Gallery, '62.
- Orissa, Cuttack, Nari Seva Sangha Hall, '62.
- Finland, Helsinki, Sturenkarto, '62.
- Bombay, Sir J.J. School of Arts, '62.

== Participation in major national and international shows (selected) ==
- New Delhi, Indian Habitat Centre, Gujarat Earthquake, Organised by VHAI, 2001
- IV Bharat Bhavan Biennale of Contemporary Indian Art (award), Bhopal, 1992.
- 2nd Biennale, Cuba, Havana, 1985.
- 3rd Asian Biennale, Bangladesh, 1985.
- Tokyo Biennale, the 15th International Art Show, Japan, 1984.
- VII British International Print Biennale, Bradford, UK, 1982.
- 2nd, 3rd and 4th Triennale India, Delhi, 1971, 1976 and 1978.
- Venice Biennale, Italy, 1978.
- All India Fine Arts Crafts Society (AIFACS), National Show of Portraits (award), Delhi, 1976.
- All India Graphics Show, Group 8, Delhi, (award), 1972.
- Septieme Biennale de Paris, France, 1971.
- The Bombay Art Society (Governor's Award), Bombay, 1965.
- Maharashtra State Art Exhibition, Lalit Kala Academy, Bombay, 1962.

== Commissions (selected) ==
- Façade mural, Chelsea Arts Club, London, UK, 2009
- 3 murals, one metal sculpture and one metal mobile, Nat'l Centre for Plant Genome Research, Delhi, 2005.
- Mural: ‘The Journey of India: Mohenjodaro to Mahatma Gandhi’, Indian Parliament, Delhi 2001.
- Welded steel installation, Bhilai Steel Plant, Madhya Pradesh, 1996.
- Mural, LBS National Academy of Administration, Mussorie, 1992.
- Fresco, Birla Kreeda Kendra, Bombay, 1964.
- Mosaic Mural, Dena Bank, Bombay, 1965
- Cement Mural, Bombay Gymkhana, 1960s; Architect: Juliet Vaz
- Collage Mural, Agricultural Ministry, Pragati Maidan, 1972
- Postal stamps for Indian Postal Service on road safety, world peace and the Int’l Red Cross.
- Created Murals in Egg Tempera, Mosaic, Cement and Oils.
- Graphics Edition- Etching, Lithography and Serigraphs.
- Workshop with the Israeli artist Meenashe Kadishman in ’99.

== Teaching ==
- Visiting Professor, Faculty of Fine Arts, Jamia Millia Islamia, Delhi, India, 2009–2011;
- Professor Emeritus, JMI University, 2008;
- Visiting Professor: College of Art, National School of Drama, National Institute of Design and School of Planning and Architecture

== Books ==
- The Art of Jatin Das, Shobita Punja, Roli Books, 2003
- Poems by Jatin Das, Writers' Workshop Calcutta, 1972

== JD Centre of Art ==
In 1997 a trust was registered with Jatin Das as its founder, settler and chairman for the creation of the JD Centre of Art, Bhubaneshwar, Orissa, designed by BV Doshi, an eminent architect. It is a private non-commercial institution that will celebrate the whole range of traditional and contemporary visual and plastic arts.

== Pankha: hand fans of the Indian subcontinent ==
28 years ago Jatin Das began a collection of pankha (hand fans). This now numbers over 6,000 fans and related objects, the majority from the Indian subcontinent. Since May 2004, sections of the collection have been on display at eminent museums in India and overseas. The inaugural show at the National Crafts Museum, Delhi, was followed by exhibitions at the Victoria Memorial; Calcutta, Fan Museum; London, National Art Gallery; Kuala Lumpur, Reitberg Museum; Zurich and National Museum; Manila. The collection will eventually be housed in a dedicated museum in New Delhi. A book on the subject, ‘To Stir the Still Air’, is being published by Mapin International.

== Overstaying in govt accommodation ==
In 2015, around 24 artists including Jatin Das have been issued notices for staying for decades in government flats that were originally allotted only for three years.

== Misconduct Accusation ==
In 2018, Nisha Bora accused him of sexual misconduct in 2004 when she went to meet the painter at his studio he tried to grope her and forcefully kiss her on the lips. The artist has denied the accusation.

Later another woman, Garusha Katoch, also accused Das of inappropriate behaviour. Anushree Majumdar, journalist with the Indian Express, also shared a disturbing instance with him.

However, Das firmly denies these allegations. No formal complaint has been filed to date.

In total, eleven women came forward with Jatin Das’s sexual misconduct. Given his privileged background, not much has been done legally.
