= List of cities in Odisha by population =

This is a list of cities by population, as listed in the 2011 Census of India in the Indian state of Odisha:

State rank	Country rank	Name	District	Type*	Population 2011	Male	Female	Literacy rate
01	58	Bhubaneswar	Khordha district	Municipal Corporation	881,988	468,302	413,686	93.00
02	73	Cuttack	Cuttack district	Municipal Corporation	658,986	331,246	327,740	91.03
03	81	Raurkela	Sundargarh district	Municipal Corporation	552,970	291,027	261,943	92.01
04	127	Berhampur	Ganjam district	Municipal Corporation	355,823	185,584	170,239	90.04
05	135	Sambalpur	Sambalpur district	Municipal Corporation	335,761	172,806	162955	85.69
06	228	Puri	Puri district	Municipality	201,026	104,267	96,759	89.38
07	407	Balasore	Balasore district	Municipality	144,373	73,721	70,652	86.58
08	446	Baripada	Mayurbhanj district	Municipality	116,874	60,535	56,339	88.02
09	456	Bhadrak	Bhadrak district	Municipality	107,463	55,090	52,373	81.21
Population, City= 1Lakh+ population, Town= 20 Thousand+ Population

== List of urban agglomerations of Odisha ==
In the census of India 2011, an urban agglomeration has been defined as follows:

"An Urban Agglomeration is a continuous urban spread constituting a town and its adjoining outgrowths (OG), or two or more physically contiguous towns together with or without outgrowths of such towns. An urban agglomeration must consist of at least a statutory town and its total population (i.e. all the constituents put together) should not be less than 20,000 as per the 2001 Census. In varying local conditions, there were similar other combinations which have been treated as urban agglomerations satisfying the basic condition of contiguity."

=== Urban agglomeration constituents ===
Urban agglomeration constituents with a population 2011 Census are shown in the table below.

Urban agglomeration	Name of constituent	District	Type*	Population 2011	Male	Female	Population below 5 yrs	Literacy rate
Bhubaneswar	Bhubaneswar town	Khordha district	M Corp.	837,737	445,233	392,504	75,237	93.15
Cuttack	Cuttack	Cuttack district	M Corp.	606,007	303,530	302,477	48,585	91.17
Rourkela	Rourkela industrial township	Sundergarh district	IT	210,412	109,823	100,589	20,399	86.60
	Rourkela city	Sundergarh district	M Corp.	273,217	144,949	128,268	29,050	87.95
Sambalpur	Sambalpur town	Sambalpur district	M Corp.	269,575	138,826	130,749	27,510	85.69
Puri	Puri town	Puri district	M	201,026	104,267	96,759	17,000	89.38
Balasore	Balasore town	Balasore district	M	118,202	60,308	57,894	11,115	88.79
Baripada	Baripada town	Mayurbhanj district	M	110,058	57,008	53,050	9,933	89.31
Balangir	Balangir town	Balangir district	M	98,238	50,582	47656	10248	77.27

Abbreviations: M Corp.= municipal corporation, M= municipality, NAC= notified area committee, CT = census town, IT= industrial town, OG= outgrowth

==== Constituents ====
The constituents of urban agglomerations in Odisha, with a population of 1 lakh or above, are noted below:

- Bhubaneswar Urban Agglomeration includes: Bhubaneswar Town (M Corp.), Industrial & Colony Area (OG), Patrapada (OG), Sijua (OG), Ransinghapur (OG), Sarakantara (OG), Bahadalpur (OG), Ebaranga (OG), Raghunathpur (OG), Kalarahanga (OG), Injana (OG), Rokat (OG), Kesora (OG), Koradakanta (OG), and Bankual (OG).
- Cuttack Urban Agglomeration includes: Cuttack (M Corp.), Choudwar Town (M), and Industrial Area (OG)
- Rourkela Urban Agglomeration includes: Rourkela Industrial Township (IT), I.D.L. Factory & Other Colony Area (OG), Rourkela Town (M corp.), Kalunga Industrial Estate & Other Colony Area (OG), Jalda Town (CT)
- Berhampur Urban Agglomeration includes: Berhampur (M Crop.), Gopalpur (NAC) and Chatrapur (NAC),Kukudakandi (NAC),Kanisi(OG), Ankushpur (OG)and nearby Villages and Panchayats which have a large number of population but not included in BeMC.
- Puri Urban Agglomeration includes: Puri(M), Puri Sadar (OG) and Konark (NAC)
- Paradeep Urban Agglomeration includes: Udachandrapur (OG), Chauliapalanda (OG), Sandhakuda (OG), Bijayachandrapur(OG) and Bhitaragarh (OG)
- Sambalpur Urban Agglomeration includes: Sambalpur Town (M), Dhankauda & Mathapali Area (OG), Burla Town (NAC), Amsadha Katapali Area (OG), and Hirakud Town (NAC)
- Balasore Urban Agglomeration includes: Baleshwar Town (M), Baleshwar Industrial Estate (OG), and Remuna Town (NAC)
- Bhadrak Urban Agglomeration includes: Bhadrak (M), Randia (OG), Sarmanga (OG), Koranta (OG), Boudhpur (OG), Samaraipur (OG), Erei Town (CT)
- Baripada Urban Agglomeration includes: Baripada Town (M), Podaastia Business Center Area (OG), Subarnarekha Irrigation Project Colony (OG), and Indupahi (OG)
- Balangir Urban Agglomeration includes: Balangir Town (M), Loishingha (NAC), Deogaon (OG), Lower Sukhtel Project Colony (OG), Sadaepali (OG), and Khaliapali (OG)
- Bargarh Urban Agglomeration includes: Bargarh Town (M), Khedapali (OG), Ambapali (OG), Barahguda (OG), Tora (OG), and Ruhunia (OG)
