= Mrinal Chatterjee =

Indian academic (born 1961)

Prof. Dr. Mrinal Chatterjee
- Born: 10 February 1961 (age 65); Katwa, Bardhaman district, West Bengal
- Citizenship: Indian
- Education: Berhampur University; Utkal University; Guru Jambheshwar University
- Occupations: Journalist, columnist
- Chatterjee's voice Recorded January 2014

Mrinal Chatterjee (born 10 February 1961) is an Indian academic and author. He heads the Indian Institute of Dhenkanal. He has authored five academic books on media studies in Odia, including History of Journalism in Odisha and Glossary of Terms for Media Persons. He has authored ten novels and seven short story collections in Odia, including Jagate Thiba Jate Dina published (2010), Kandhei (2013), Eka Sundar Chandini Ratire (2016), Yamraj Chutire (2015), Yamraj Number 5003 (2016), which is translated into Assamese, and a series of columns in Odia

== Career ==
He started his career as a lecturer in English in 1983, joined Sambad, an Odia daily in 1984 as sub-editor and became Edition-in-Charge of Sambad's North Odisha edition in December 1996. As a Journalist, Chatterjee has written extensively on Environment. He has been awarded the K.K. Birla Foundation Fellowship(1996) and Journalist Fellowship by Centre for Science and Environment(1991 and 1992).

He joined Indian Institute of Mass Communication (IIMC), Dhenkanl as associate professor in February 1999. He became Professor and head of the Eastern India campus of IIMC located in Dhenkanal, Odisha in June 2008.

He has also extensively worked in radio and television. He worked in AIR and Doordarshan in several capacities- as Announcer and Newsreader for over 7 years, besides doing various programs. He has written the story and screenplay of many successful tele-serials and anchored many radio and television programs.

== Academic qualifications ==
- DLit, Berhampur University, Odish, 2022
- PhD (Journalism and Mass Communication), Berhampur University, 2007
- M.M.C.(Masters in Mass Communication) Guru Jambheswar University, 2002.
- M.A. (Public Administration), Utkal University, 1993
- M.A. (English), Utkal University, 1982
- LL.B. Utkal University, 1983
- H.S.C., BOSE, Odisha, 1976
- Certificate Course in Human Rights, IGNOU, 2007
- Certificate Course in German, Utkal University, 199

== Teaching experience ==
- Professor (Communication), Regional Director, Indian Institute of Mass Communication (IIMC), Dhenkanal, Odisha since June 2008
- Associate Professor, (Communication Theory and Research), Indian Institute of Mass Communication (IIMC), Dhenkanal, Odisha since February 1999.

== Papers published ==
- Sustainable Human Development and Role of Media, Role of Media in Development and Governance: A compilation of Articles, Centre for Media Research and Development Studies, Kolkata, 2008
- Sensitize Grassroot-level Journalists to reach Rural communities, Indian Media Studies Journal, Volume 1, Number 1, July–December 2006

== Publications ==
Non-Fiction:

- Gana Madhyam O Sambadikata (Mass Media and Journalism), Sephali Communications, Balasore 1998. A collection of essays in Odia on Mass Media.
- Pariibesh O Jana Sachetanata (Environment and Peoples' awareness), Pine Books, Cuttack, 1997. A research based book on peoples' awareness pertaining to environment in Odia.
- Sabda, Chhabi, Akhara (Sound, Picture & Script), Sephali Communications, Bhubaneswar, 2002. A collection of essays in Odia in Mass Media.
- Glossary of Terms for Media Persons, Sephali Communications, Dhenkanal, 2015
- Odishare Sambadikatara Itihas, Sephali Communications, Dhenkanal, 2015
- History of Journalism in Odisha, Sephali Communications, Dhenkanal, 2015

Fiction :

- Nian (The Fire), Pine Books, Cuttack 1997. A docu-fiction on Baripada Fire Tragedy.
- Bharatpur ra Bagha, (The Tiger of Bharatpur), Pine Books, Cuttack. 1995. Novel. A social satire.
- Secretariat re Bagha (The Tiger in the Secretariat), Sephali Communications, Baripada. 1995. Novel. A political satire.
- Orissa O Ananya Galpa ( Orissa and other stories), Friends Publishers, Cuttack. 1991. Anthology of short stories.
- Brutta O Ananya Galpa ( The Circle and other stories), Granthamandira, Cuttack, 2000. Anthology of short stories.
- Shakti (The Power), Sephali Communications, Dhenkanal, 2000. A Novel.
- Rangadhanga, Prangyaloka, Puri, 2002
- Bhala achha Nabaghana?(Are you well Nabaghana?) Sephali Communications, Dhenkanal, 2003.
- Nabaghana Bhala Achhi (Nabaghana is well), Sephali Communications, Dhenkanal, 2005.
- Bidhumukhi, Sephali Communications, Dhenkanal, 2005.
- Sani Mandira Samnare Saat Bhikari (Seven Beggars in front of Sani Temple), Kadambini Media, Bhubaneswar, 2008. Novel.
- Yamraj Chutire, Timepass Prakashan, Bhubaneswar, 2015
- Eka Sundar Chandini Ratire, Shraddha Publication, Baleswar, 2016
- Yamraj Number 5003 (Assamese), Bina Prakasani, Guwahati, 2016

Translation :

- Saranagata. Original Bengali novel by Samaresh Mazumdar. Kahani, Cuttack. 1995.
- Ekti Meye Lata. Original Bengali Children's Fiction. National Book Trust. 1997.
- Nagaraja ra Duniya (The World of Nagaraj). Original English novel by R.K. Narayana. Pine Books, Cuttack. 1998
- Samakaleen Gujarati Kahania (Contemporary Gujarati Stories). Original stories by contemporary Gujarati short story writers. National Book Trust, New Delh# 2005.
- Amara gachapatra Dehrare ebebi Baduchi (Our trees still grow in Dehra). Original English stories by Ruskin Bond. Sahitya Akademi, Kolkata. 2005.
- Mahasweta Devinka Srestha Galpa (Best stories of Mahasweta Devi). Original Bengali short stories by Mahasweta Dev# National Book Trust, New Delh# 2006.

Radio Plays and Serials:

- Yamaraj Chhutire ( Lord of Death on leave), Radio play. AIR, Cuttack. First broadcast- 2008
- Ghataka (The Executioner), Radio play. AIR, Cuttack. First broadcast- 1992
- Rabibara re Dine (On one Sunday) Radio play. AIR, Cuttack. First broadcast- 1992
- Nabaghanara Sansara (The family of Nabaghana) Radio serial. AIR, Jeypore. Six Episodes. First broadcast- 2001
- Kemiti Chalichi (How are things going), 13- episode Radio serial, AIR, Cuttack. First broadcast- 2004
- E Duniya kala kimiya (The world mesmerised me), 13- episode Radio serial, AIR, Cuttack. First broadcast – August 2006

Tele Serials:

- Made in Odisha, E-TV Odia, Fifty plus Episodes. First telecast- 2002.
- Kahile kahiba kahuchi, E-TV, Odia. Fifty plus episodes. First telecast- 2004

== Awards ==
- Sahakar Galpa Samman, January 2008
- Felicited by ‘Dr. Radhanath Rath Sambad Sahitya Award by Utkal Sahitya Samaj, Cuttack. July 2007
- Best Rural Journalist Award by Janavani, Bhubaneswar. February 2007
- Mayurbhanj Samman, Baripada. December 2006
- Odisha Living Legend Award by Odisha Diary,2013
