= Gadadhar Misra =

Indian mathematician (born 1956)

- Born: 1 March 1956 (age 70); Bhubaneswar, Odisha
- Citizenship: Indian
- Education: Sambalpur University, SUNY at Stony Brook
- Awards: Shanti Swarup Bhatnagar Prize for Science and Technology, Biju Patnaik Award for Scientific Excellence
- Scientific career
- Fields: Operator theory in mathematics
- Workplaces: Indian Institute of Science, Bangalore
- Doctoral advisor: Ronald G. Douglas

Gadadhar Misra (born 1 March 1956) is an Indian mathematician who specializes in operator theory. He was born at Bhubaneswar in the state of Odisha to Prof Chakrapani Mishra and Smt Arunabala Mishra. He studied at DM School, BJB College, Sambalpur University (Masters, 1979) and State University of New York in USA (PhD, 1982). He taught at Indian Statistical Institute (ISI), Kolkata and Bengaluru before joining the Indian Institute of Science (IISc), Bengaluru where he is currently engaged in teaching and research.

He was awarded the Shanti Swarup Bhatnagar Prize for Science and Technology in 2001, the highest science award in India, in the mathematical sciences category. He was awarded the Biju Patnaik Award for Scientific Excellence by Odisha Bigyan Academy in 2013. Gadadhar found counter examples to a conjecture on similarity of operators in the Cowen and Douglas class. He gave an explicit description of the class of completely non-unitary contractions whose characteristic function is constant. He obtained a canonical model as well as complete invariants for a class of quotient Hilbert modules, and introduced the notion of quasi-free Hilbert modules to generalize parts of the Sz-Nagy-Foias model theory in the context of multi-variate operator theory. He obtained a classification of scalar homogeneous shifts and also calculated the joint Taylor spectrum of a class of multiplication operators on the "twisted" Bergman space. Misra described the holomorphic Hermitian vector bundles over the unit disc, which are homogeneous under the action of SL (2,R). He has carried out a complete classification of all irreducible homogeneous operators in the Cowen-Douglas class.

Gadadhar Misra is married to Tanuja Misra and their daughter Neeldhara Mishra is an assistant professor of Mathematics and Computer Science at IIT, Gandhi Nagar.
