= Narasandha =

- Village
- Interactive map of Narasandha
- Location within Odisha Location within India
- Coordinates: 22°04′58″N 85°47′01″E
- Country: India
- State: Odisha
- District: Mayurbhanj

Area
  - Total: 5.890 km^{2} (2.274 sq mi)
  - Land: 589 ha (1,460 acres)
- Elevation: 589 m (1,932 ft)

Population (2011)
  - Total: 1,473
  - Density: 250.1/km^{2} (647.7/sq mi)

Languages
  - Official: Ho, Odia, Hindi
- Time zone: UTC+5:30 (IST)
- PIN: 757035

Narasandha is a village located in Ghagharbeda CD block of Mayurbhanj district of Indian state Odisha, India. In 2036 population will be 4,624, in 2027 population will be 1,734 people and as per latest available census (2011) is 1,473 people. The population in 2001 census is 1,257 people. The village covers an area of 5.89 km^{2}.

It is 6.7 kilometres (4.16mi) from Ghagarbeda, 137 kilometres (85mi) from Baripada and 267 kilometres (165mi) from Bhubaneshwar.

== Demographics ==
Narasandha has a population of 1,473 people, in 333 households with 699 being males and 774 being females. Sex ratio is 1108 females per 1000 males. The children population is 254, making 17.24% up of Narasandha's population.

Population density is 250.1 inhabitants per square kilometre (647.7/sq.mi)

The literacy rate is 60.46%, lower than national average of 72.98%.

1. Scheduled castes (0.70%)
2. Scheduled tribes (47.6%)
3. Not indigenous (51.7%)

There are 11 scheduled caste people, with 6 being males and 5 being females. Scheduled Tribes are 701 with 333 being males and 368 being females. People that are not indigenous are 761 in number.
