= Uma Charan Mohanty =

Indian meteorologist

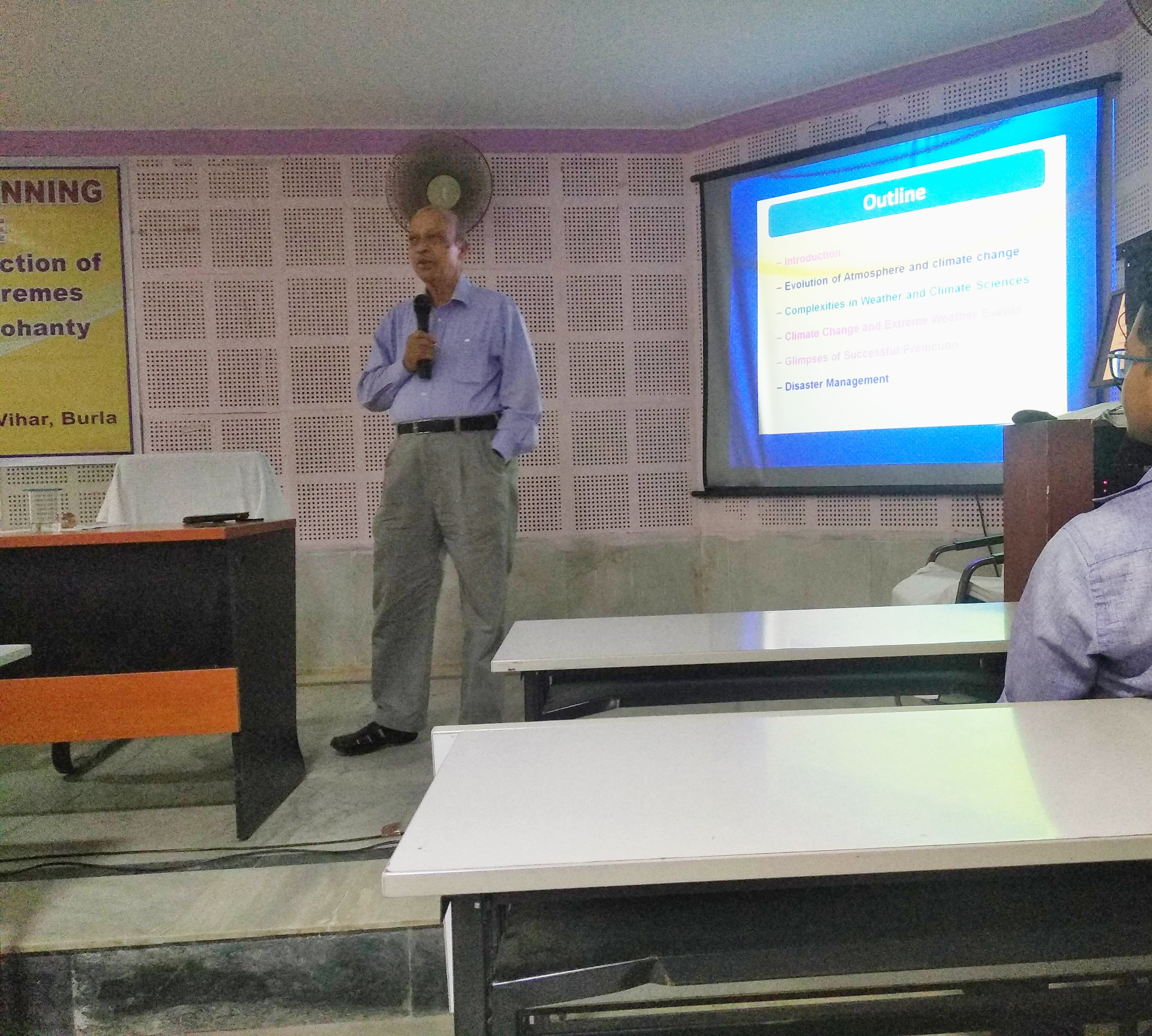
- Uma Charan Mohanty giving a seminar in Sambalpur University on climate change
- Born: 29 June 1948 (age 78); Odisha, India
- Education: Utkal University; Hydrometeorological Centre of Russia; Department of Science and Technology; Odisha Bigyan Academy; UN-CECAR
- Known for: Studies on Indian summer monsoon and tropical cyclones
- Awards: 1984 M. G. Deshpande Award; 1989 12th MAUSAM Award; 1993 S. S. Bhatnagar Prize; 1996 AR & DB Silver Jubilee Award; 1999 Samanta Chandra Sekhar Award; 2009 Sir Gilbert Walker Gold Medal; 2013 National Award in Atmospheric Sciences and Technology
- Scientific career
- Fields: Meteorology
- Workplaces: IIT Bhubaneswar; IIT Delhi

Uma Charan Mohanty (born 1948) is an Indian meteorologist and an emeritus professor at the School of Earth, Ocean and Climate Sciences of the Indian Institute of Technology, Bhubaneswar. He is the president of Odisha Bigyan Academy and is known for his researches on the Indian summer monsoon. Besides being an elected fellow of the Indian Geophysical Union, he is also an elected fellow of all the three major Indian science academies viz. Indian National Science Academy, Indian Academy of Sciences, and the National Academy of Sciences, India. The Council of Scientific and Industrial Research, the apex agency of the Government of India for scientific research, awarded him the Shanti Swarup Bhatnagar Prize for Science and Technology, one of the highest Indian science awards, for his contributions to Earth, Atmosphere, Ocean and Planetary Sciences in 1993. (Note: Long link - please select award year to see details)

== Biography ==
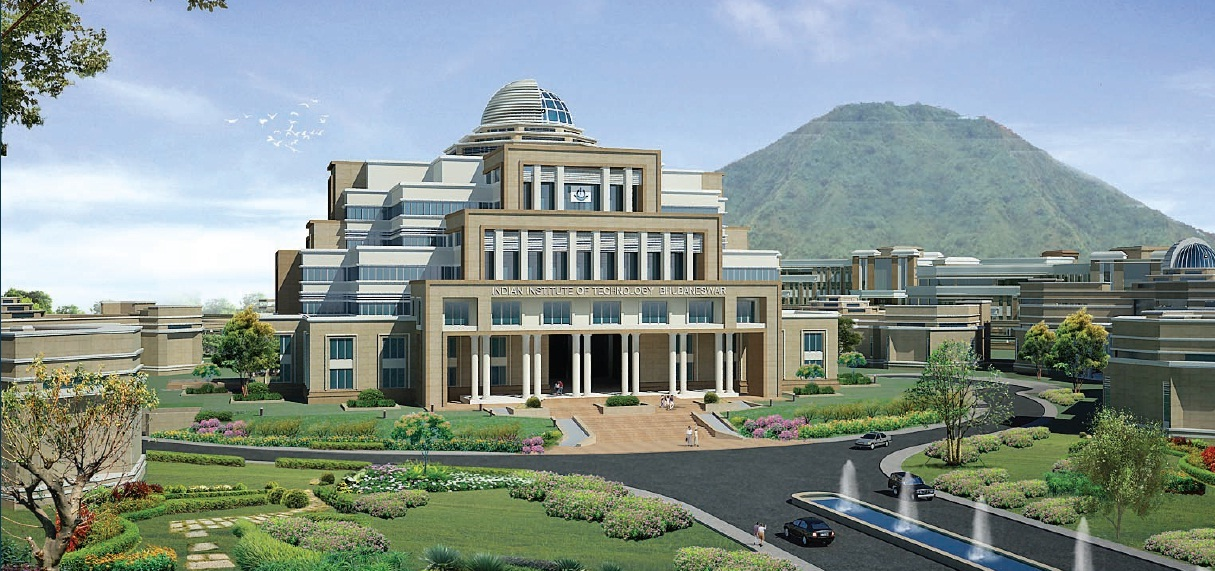
IIT Bhubaneswar Main Building

U. C. Mohanty, born on 29 June 1948 in the Indian state of Odisha, graduated in science from Utkal University in 1969 and completed his master's degree in physics from the same university in 1971. Subsequently, he enrolled for his doctoral studies at Hydrometeorological Centre of Russia and obtained a PhD in Tropical meteorology in 1978. Returning to India, he started his career at the Indian Institute of Technology Bhubaneswar (IIT BBS) as a senior scientific officer, a post he held till 1992 when he was sent on deputation to the Department of Science and Technology as the joint director and head of the Research Division for a three-year term. On completion of his deputation, he returned to IIT BBS but stayed there only for three more years and joined the Indian Institute of Technology Delhi (IITD) in 1998 as a professor at the Centre for Atmospheric Sciences. In 1998, he assumed the directorship of the Centre and served as a Higher Academic Grade (HAG) professor till his superannuation in 2013. On retirement, he returned to IIT BBS as a visiting professor and holds the rank of an emeritus professor. Since 2013, he has also been heading the Odisha Bigyan Academy as its president. He is also a former visiting scientist at the Asian Disaster Preparedness Centre, Thailand and is a faculty member at the University Network for Climate and Ecosystems Change Adaptation Research (UN-CECAR) of the United Nations.

== Legacy ==
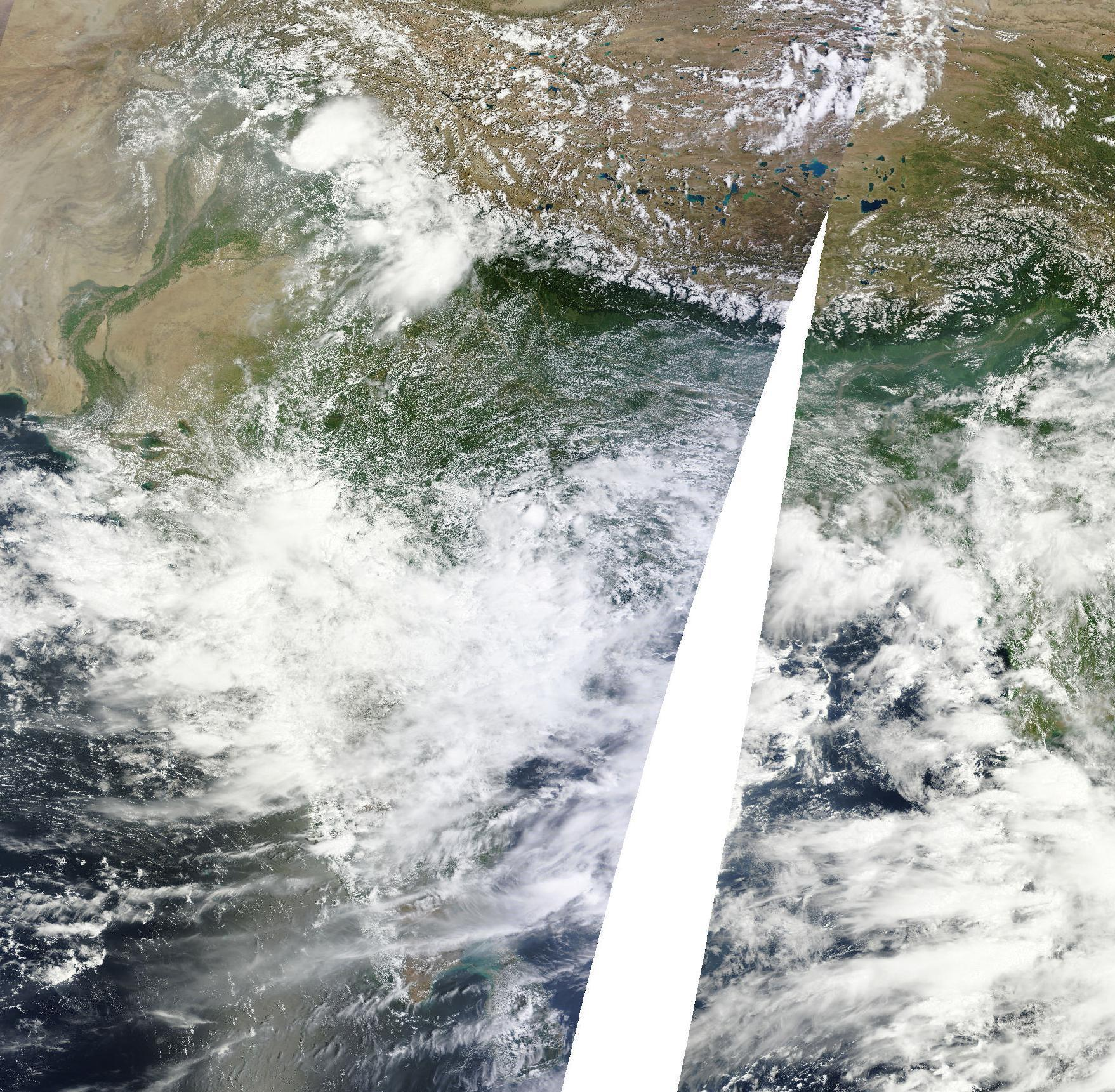
Monsoon over India

Mohanty is known to have done extensive research on Indian summer monsoon and his studies have assisted in widening the understanding of the phenomena. He developed several numerical models and simulations for weather prediction and his experiments helped predict tropical cyclones, rainfall events, thunderstorms and snow storms in the region. He overseas a team of researchers engaged in the study of coastal inundation with a view to develop Land-Ocean-Atmospheric Modelling System for predicting extreme weather events. His studies have been detailed in several peer-reviewed articles; (Note: Please see Selected bibliography section) ResearchGate and Google Scholar, two online repositories of scientific articles, have listed 270 and 323 of them respectively. He has also co-edited a book, Monitoring and Prediction of Tropical Cyclones in the Indian Ocean and Climate Change, published by Springer Science+Business Media in 2013. He has edited the book, Advanced Numerical Modelling and Data Assimilation Techniques for Tropical Cyclone Prediction, published by Springer Science+Business Media in 2016.

Mohanty is a member of the Core Group on Floods of the National Disaster Management Authority as well as the Scientific Review and Monitoring Committee (SRMC) of the Indian Institute of Tropical Meteorology; he was among the organizers of the National Symposium on Tropical Meteorology (TROPMET-2016) at the Siksha O Anusandhan University during 19–23 December 2016. He was also involved in the organization of the 22nd State Level National Children's Science Congress held at KIIT International School in 2014 where he served as a judge of the congress. He is known to have made over 45 international visits and has delivered plenary or invited addresses at several conferences and seminars including the lecture on Numerical Simulation of Track and Intensity of Orissa Super Cyclone-1999 at the 5th International Conference on Information Technology in 2002, the seminar on Numerical Modeling of Land Surface Processes for Improved-Simulation of Extreme Weather Events over the Indian Region of 2014 and the Colloquium on Recent Developments in Prediction of Tropical Cyclone and Associated Coastal Hazards of 2016, both held at IIT Bhubaneswar, and the National Workshop on GPS RO Techniques and Applications of 2015 held at SRM Institute of Science and Technology.

== Awards and honours ==
Mohanty received the Prof. M. G. Deshpande Award in 1984, followed by the 12th MAUSAM Award of the Mausam journal of the India Meteorological Department in 1989 and the Silver Jubilee Award of the Aeronautics Research and Development Board in 1996. The Odisha Bigyan Academy presented him the Samanta Chandra Sekhar Award in 1999 and the Council of Scientific and Industrial Research awarded him the Shanti Swarup Bhatnagar Prize, one of the highest Indian science awards in 1993. He received the Sir Gilbert Walker Gold Medal of the Walker Institute, UK in 2009, the National Award in Atmospheric Science and Technology of the Ministry of Earth Sciences in 2013., Biju Patnaik Award for Scientific Excellence in 2017., Faculty Research Award in 2017-18., Odisha Citizens Award in Education in 2018.

The Indian Academy of Sciences elected Mohanty as its fellow in 1993 and the other two major Indian science academies, the National Academy of Sciences, India and the Indian National Science Academy, followed suit in 1997 and 2014 respectively. In between, he was elected by the Indian Meteorological Society (1999), Indian National Academy of Engineering (2010) and Indian Geophysical Union (2010) as their fellows. He also held the Senior Associate-ship of the International Centre for Theoretical Physics during 2002–09. Prof U. C. Mohanty elected as President, Odisha Bigyan Academy Odisha Bigyan Academy during 2013-2015.

== Selected bibliography ==
=== Books ===
- U.C. Mohanty; M. Mohapatra; O.P. Singh, B.K. Bandyopadhyay, L.S. Rathore (12 October 2013). Monitoring and Prediction of Tropical Cyclones in the Indian Ocean and Climate Change. Springer Science & Business Media. ISBN 978-94-007-7720-0.

=== Articles ===
- Victor N. Mansfield; John B. Carlson; Gabriella Eichinger Ferro-Luzzi; H. J. Eysenck; Uma Charan Mohanty; Balaji Mundkur; Karl A. Wipf (June 1981). "Mandalas and Mesoamerican Pecked Circles [and Comments and Reply]". Current Anthropology. 22 (3): 269–284. doi:10.1086/202664. S2CID 162758590.
- Prasad, K.; Dash, S. K.; Mohanty, U. C. (2010). "A logistic regression approach for monthly rainfall forecasts in meteorological subdivisions of India based on DEMETER retrospective forecasts". International Journal of Climatology. 30 (10): 1577–1588. Bibcode:2010IJCli..30.1577P. doi:10.1002/joc.2019. S2CID 129498155.
- Dash, S. K.; Nair, Archana Anil; Kulkarni, Makarand A.; Mohanty, U. C. (2011). "Characteristic changes in the long and short spells of different rain intensities in India". Theoretical and Applied Climatology. 105 (3–4): 563–570. Bibcode:2011ThApC.105..563D. doi:10.1007/s00704-011-0416-x. S2CID 122264919.
- Osuri, Krishna K.; Mohanty, U. C.; Routray, A.; Kulkarni, Makarand A.; Mohapatra, M. (2012). "Customization of WRF-ARW model with physical parameterization schemes for the simulation of tropical cyclones over North Indian Ocean". Natural Hazards. 63 (3): 1337–1359. Bibcode:2012NatHa..63.1337O. doi:10.1007/s11069-011-9862-0. S2CID 129824186.
- Nair, Archana; Mohanty, U. C.; Acharya, Nachiketa (2013). "Monthly prediction of rainfall over India and its homogeneous zones during monsoon season: a supervised principal component regression approach on general circulation model products". Theoretical and Applied Climatology. 111 (1–2): 327–339. Bibcode:2013ThApC.111..327N. doi:10.1007/s00704-012-0660-8. S2CID 122723011.

== See also ==
- Monsoon of South Asia
- Indian Monsoon Current
