= Pathani Samanta Planetarium =

Planetarium

Coordinates: 20.2981°N 85.8323°E

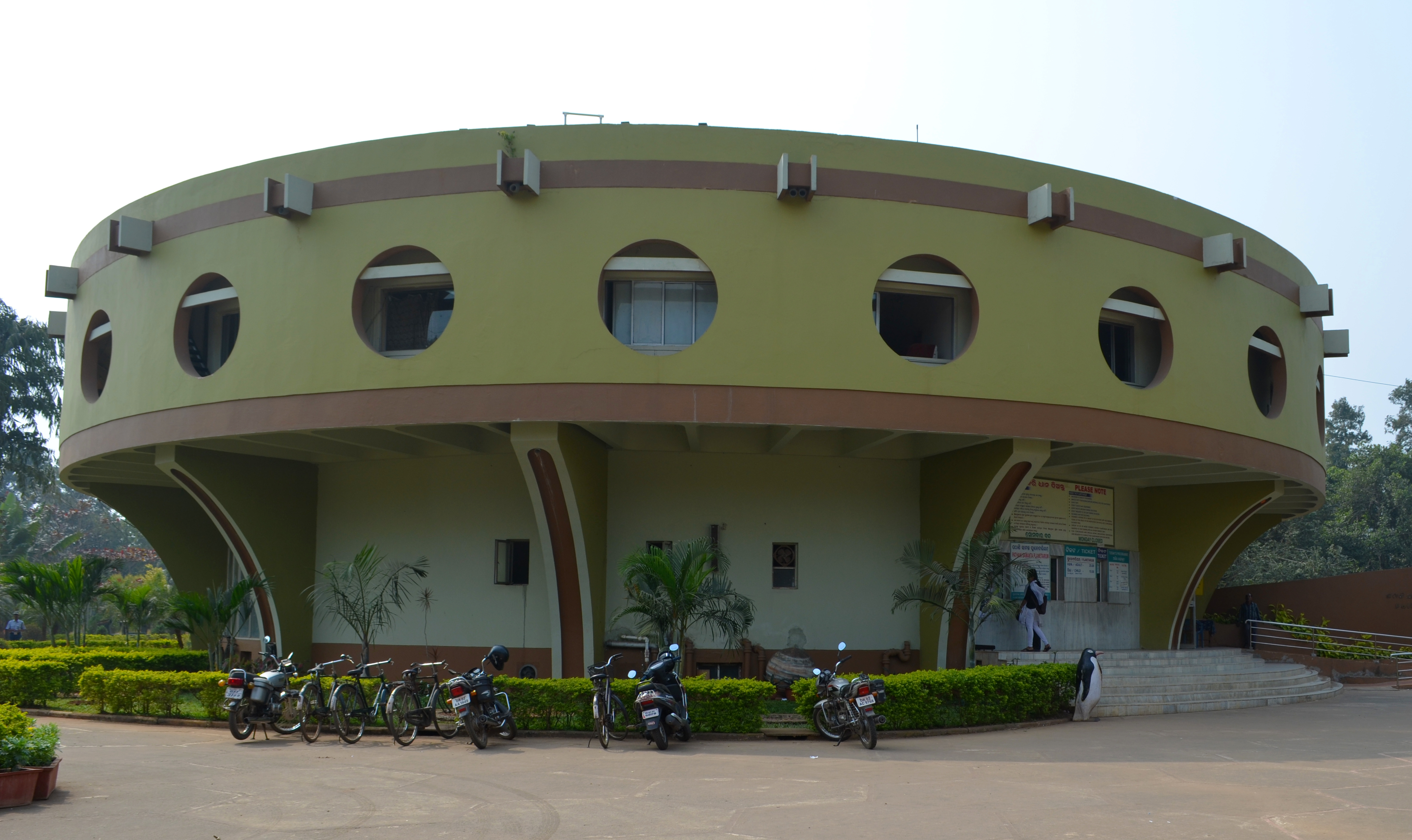
Pathani Samanta Planetarium

Pathani Samanta Planetarium is a planetarium in the city of Bhubaneswar in India named after astronomer Pathani Samanta. It was founded for creating awareness about astronomy. It carries on activities like night sky viewing, audio-visual programs and poster shows. It also displays various astronomical devices. It also shows the history of Pathani Samanta with stone carvings on the walls. It also shows some of his inventions like the sundial.

The planetarium was established by the Science and Technology Department, Government of Odisha.

== Gallery ==
Statue of Pathani Samanta

== See also ==
- List of Museums in Odisha
