= Umesh Chandra Patra =

Indian zoologist and professor (1942-2015)

Prof (Dr) Umesh Chandra Patra
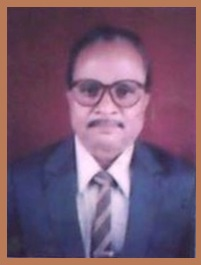
- Born: 18 January 1942; Badamulabasanta, Kendrapara, Odisha
- Died: 9 February 2015 (aged 73)
- Education: Ravenshaw University, Utkal University, Sambalpur University, Berhampur University
- Known for: Ecology, Environmental Biology, Biodiversity, Pollution, Diversity of Animals, Anatomy
- Scientific career
- Fields: Ecology, Environmental Biology, Anatomy

Umesh Chandra Patra (18 February 1942 – 9 February 2015), also known as Dr. U. C. Patra was a zoologist, intellectual, scholar, professor and administrator from the state of Orissa, India. He was head of the Department of Zoology at Ravenshaw University (formerly Ravenshaw College). He started his teaching career as a lecturer in Zoology at Shri Krushna Chandra Gajapati College, Paralakhemundi and after a long stint at various government colleges, he retired from Ravenshaw University in 2001. He was a valuable member of the Zoological Society of Odisha State.

== Education ==
Patra had passed M.Sc (Zoology) and M.Phil from Utkal University. He was awarded a Ph.D in Zoology from Berhampur University in 1975 on a topic entitled 'Ecology of the Earthworm'.

== Contributions ==
Dr.Patras' career spanned over thirty five years with a Ph.D degree and with significant publication in national and international scientific journals. He had many students under his expert supervision and tutelage over the years. He authored five textbooks in Zoology including one as a co-author in Bureau's Zoology published by Odisha State Book Bureau. He had also undertaken an Indian Council of Medical Research (ICMR) research scheme. Besides academic he was a prolific writer penning eight books of fiction and novels, and four spiritual books.

== Felicitations ==
Patra was honored by the Zoological Society of Odisha State and Utkal University Alumni Association for his professional achievements.

== Selected publication ==
- Text Book Of Zoology (For Higher Secondary Education)
- Bureau's Higher Secondary Zoology
- Practical Zoology
- Kalapan Biwi (କଳାପାନ ବିବି;Novel)
- Mahasunyara Bibhishika (ମହାଶୁନ୍ୟର ବିଭୀଷିକା;Novel)
- Dharmasamthapanrthaya(ଧର୍ମସଂସ୍ଥାର୍ପନାର୍ଥାୟ; Spiritual Book, Parts I, II & III)
- Sainathanka Hajare Hata(ସାଇନାଥଙ୍କ ହଜାରହାତ; Spiritual Book)
- Sai Smarana(ସାଇ ସ୍ମରଣ;translated)
