= Subrat Kumar Acharya =

Indian gastroenterologist

- Born: 1 November 1951 (age 74); Balasore, Odisha, India
- Citizenship: Indian
- Education: MBBS, MD, DM; MKCG Medical College and Hospital, AIIMS, New Delhi
- Occupations: Executive Director, Gastroenterology and Hepatology, Fortis Flt. Lt. Rajan Dhall Hospital, Vasant Kunj, New Delhi
- Awards: Padma Shree

Subrat Kumar Acharya (born 1 November 1951) is a gastroenterologist and liver transplant physician, a physician scientist, a writer and a teacher.

Acharya worked for almost 40 years at AIIMS, New Delhi. He is the Pro Chancellor KIIT University Bhubaneswar and HOD Gastroenterology and Hepatology PBMH KIMS (KIIT University, Bhubaneswar) and Executive Director of Gastroenterology and Hepatology at Fortis Flt. Lt. Rajan Dhall Hospital, Vasant Kunj, New Delhi.

In 2012 he was appointed director of AIIMS, Bhubaneswar, but chose to continue his service as the Head of the Department of Gastroenterology at AIIMS New Delhi.

== Awards ==
- Padma Shree, 2014
- Mitra Olympus Endoscopy Award
- P N Berry Award
- Commonwealth Medical Fellowship Award
- Om Prakash Memorial Award
- Best Young Investigator Award by Asia-Pacific Association for Study of the Liver
- Samanta Chandrasekhar Award, 2003
