= Berhampur University =

Public university in Brahmapur, Odisha, India

- Motto: Tamasoma Jyothirgamaya
- Motto in English: Let light emerge from darkness
- Type: Public
- Established: 1967; 59 years ago
- Chancellor: Governor of Odisha
- Vice-Chancellor: Asima Sahu (I/C)
- Location: Brahmapur, Odisha, India; 19.2977358°N 84.8781602°E
- Campus: Urban 250.670 Ac ACU, UGC, NAAC, AICTE, AIU
- Website: www.buodisha.edu.in

Berhampur University is a public teaching-cum-affiliating university in Brahmapur, Odisha, India.

== History ==
Berhampur University was established on 2 January 1967 as an affiliating university by the Odisha Act 21 of 1966. Lingaraj Law College is the only constituent college of the university.

== Campus ==
The present campus is known as Bhanja Vihar, named after Kabi Samrat Upendra Bhanja, a celebrated poets of Odisha. The campus is spread over about 250 acres (1.0 km^{2}) and is about 12 kilometres from the city of Brahmapur and about six kilometres from Gopalpur beach.

== Academics ==
The university has 24 departments in the streams of Science, Humanities and Business Studies at the postgraduate level, and carries out Ph.D. & D.Litt. programmes. It offers self-financing PG courses in Finance, Pharmacy & Women's studies. The university also offers a B.Ed. course on self-financing mode. It offers 28 undergraduate and postgraduate courses through its constituent colleges as well as in distance education mode through its Harihar Mardaraj Distance Education Centre.

In October 2021, Khallikote University merged with Berhampur University and the syndicate of the university created four new P.G. departments in Biotechnology, Library & Information Science, Tourism & Travel Studies and Environment Studies.

== Accreditation ==
Berhampur University was accredited by the National Assessment and Accreditation Council (NAAC) with an "A" grade.

== Affiliated colleges ==
Earlier the university had the territorial jurisdiction over Ganjam, Gajapati, Kandhamal, Koraput, Rayagada, Nabarangpur and Malkangiri districts with over 180 affiliated colleges. As per the recent decision of the Government of Odisha, the territorial jurisdiction of Berhampur University has been redefined and the colleges located in the districts of Koraput, Rayagada, Nabarangpur and Malkangiri have been transferred to Vikram Dev University, Jeypore as of the academic session 2023-24.

== Notable alumni ==
Notable alumni include:

- Dr. Subrat Kumar Acharya, gastroenterologist and liver transplant physician
- Mrinal Chatterjee, author and journalist
- Giridhar Gamang, former Chief Minister of Odisha
- Kulamani Parida, chemical scientist
- Dr. Krishna Mohan Pathi, Padma Sri awardee, Indian orthopedic surgeon from Odisha, known for his work treating the poor for free in Odisha's tribal areas
- Arun K. Pati, professor at Harish-Chandra Research Institute and notable quantum physicist
- Ravindra Prasad Patnaik, music composer, singer, actor, screenwriter and film director, winner of three Filmfare Awards (south) and three Nandi Awards
- Umesh Chandra Patra, zoologist
- Samavedam Shanmukha Sarma, spiritual teacher
- Malla Vijaya Prasad, former M.L.A, film producer
