= Maharaja Sriram Chandra Bhanja Deo University =

Public university in Orissa, India

- Former name: North Orissa University
- Motto: Sādhanā Swābhimān Sádbhābanā Swayåmsampurnatā
- Type: Public University
- Established: 13 July 1998 (28 years ago)
- Accreditation: NAAC
- Academic affiliations: UGC
- Chancellor: Governor of Odisha
- Vice-Chancellor: Mahendra Kumar Mohanty
- Location: Baripada, Odisha, India; 21.9303°N 86.7636°E
- Campus: 98.84 acres (40.00 ha); Urban
- Colours: Maroon and Yellow
- Website: mscbu.ac.in

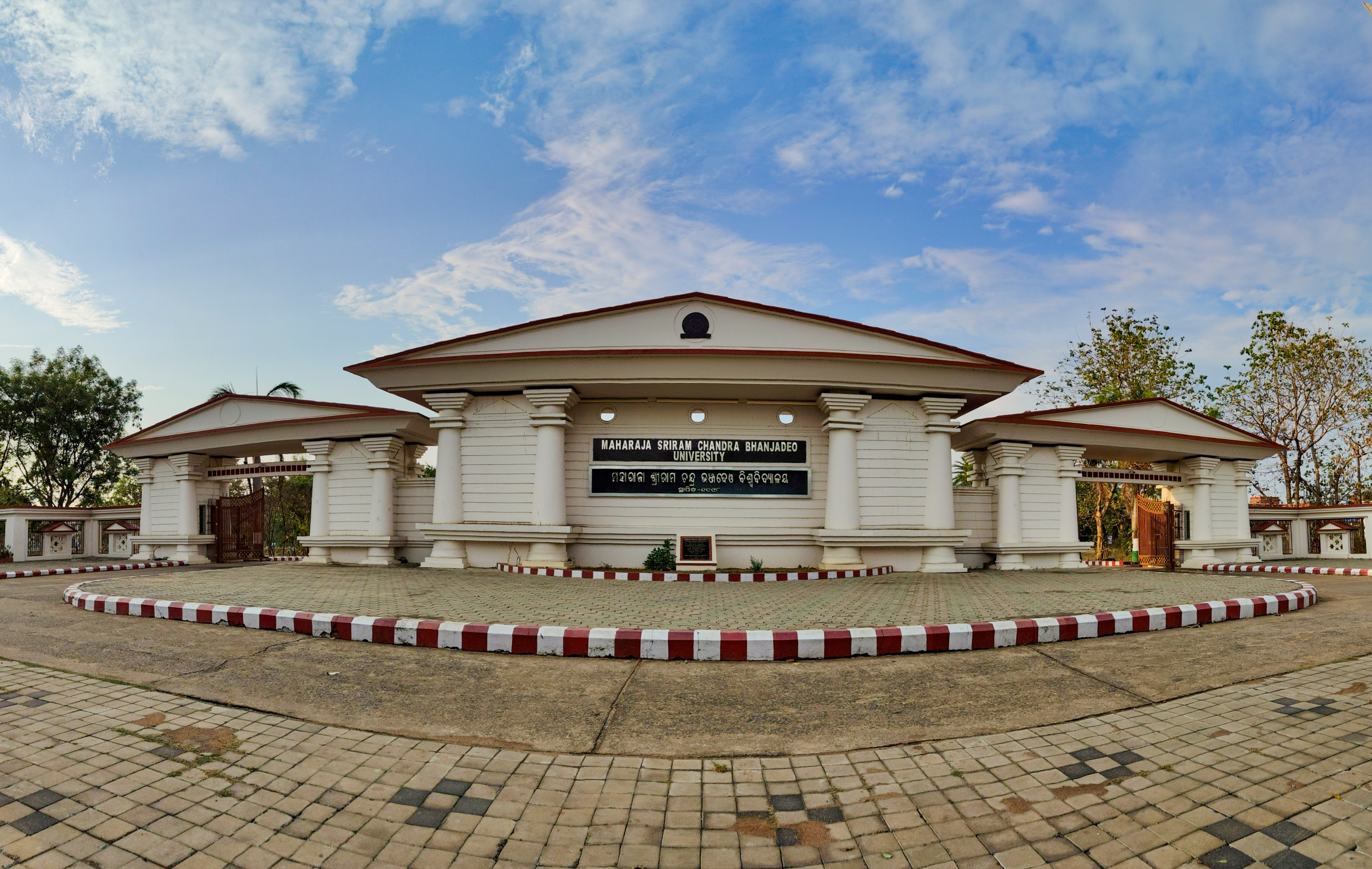
Panorama of the main entrance gate of Maharaja Sriram Chandra Bhanja Deo University

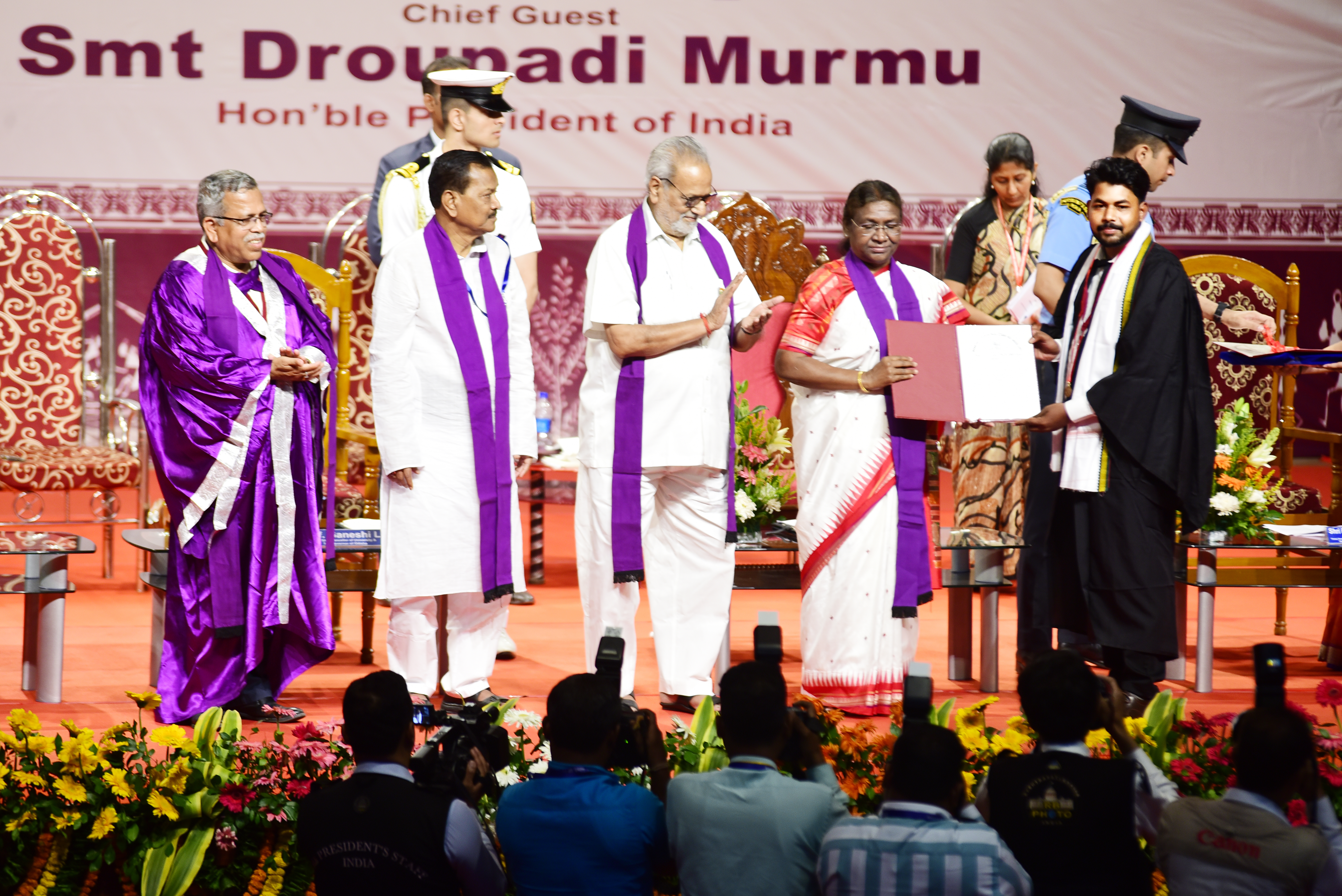
12th Convocation of Mahararaja Sriram Chandra Bhanja Deo University, Baripada

Maharaja Sriram Chandra Bhanja Deo University (MSCB University), formerly North Orissa University (NOU), is a public university in the regional city of Baripada in the state of Odisha, India. MSCB University was accredited by National Assessment and Accreditation Council (NAAC) with an A grade in third assessment cycle with a score of 3.1 out of 4 points. This university mainly provides higher education through on-campus as well as distance education modes. It aims to provide job-oriented technical courses. Maharaja Sriram Chandra Bhanja Deo University (MSCB University) ranks 5577th globally and 248th in India based on overall research output. In the academic sector, it holds positions 2836th globally and 187th in India.

== University at a glance ==
The Maharaja Sriram Chandra Bhanja Deo University (MSCB University), formerly known as North Orissa University (NOU), was founded by the Government of Odisha under Section 32 of the Odisha University Act, 1989 (Act 5 of 1989), by notice No. 880 dated 13 July 1998.

The university was established in 1999 on a 98.84-acre site in Takatpur, Baripada, in the Mayurbhanj District of Odisha. It was created by separating from Utkal University and operates as an affiliating institution. The university has been acknowledged by the University Grants Commission in accordance with Sections 2(f) and 12(B) of the UGC Act, 1956, effective from 15 February 2000, and 21 June 2006, respectively. The university's geographical authority include the Mayurbhanj and Keonjhar districts in the northern region of Odisha, which are densely inhabited with tribal populations. NOU has authority over a total of 103 institutions, which includes 65 colleges in Mayurbhanj and 38 colleges in Keonjhar. Among these schools, there are 2 autonomous institutions, 2 law colleges, and 3 teachers' education (B.Ed.) colleges, one of them reserved for physically challenged students. These colleges provide education to a significant number of students at both the undergraduate and postgraduate levels.

MSCB University has recognition from prestigious organisations such as the Bar Council of India, DEC, IGNOU, NCTE, and is included in the Association of Indian Universities and Association of Commonwealth Universities.

== Organisation and administration ==
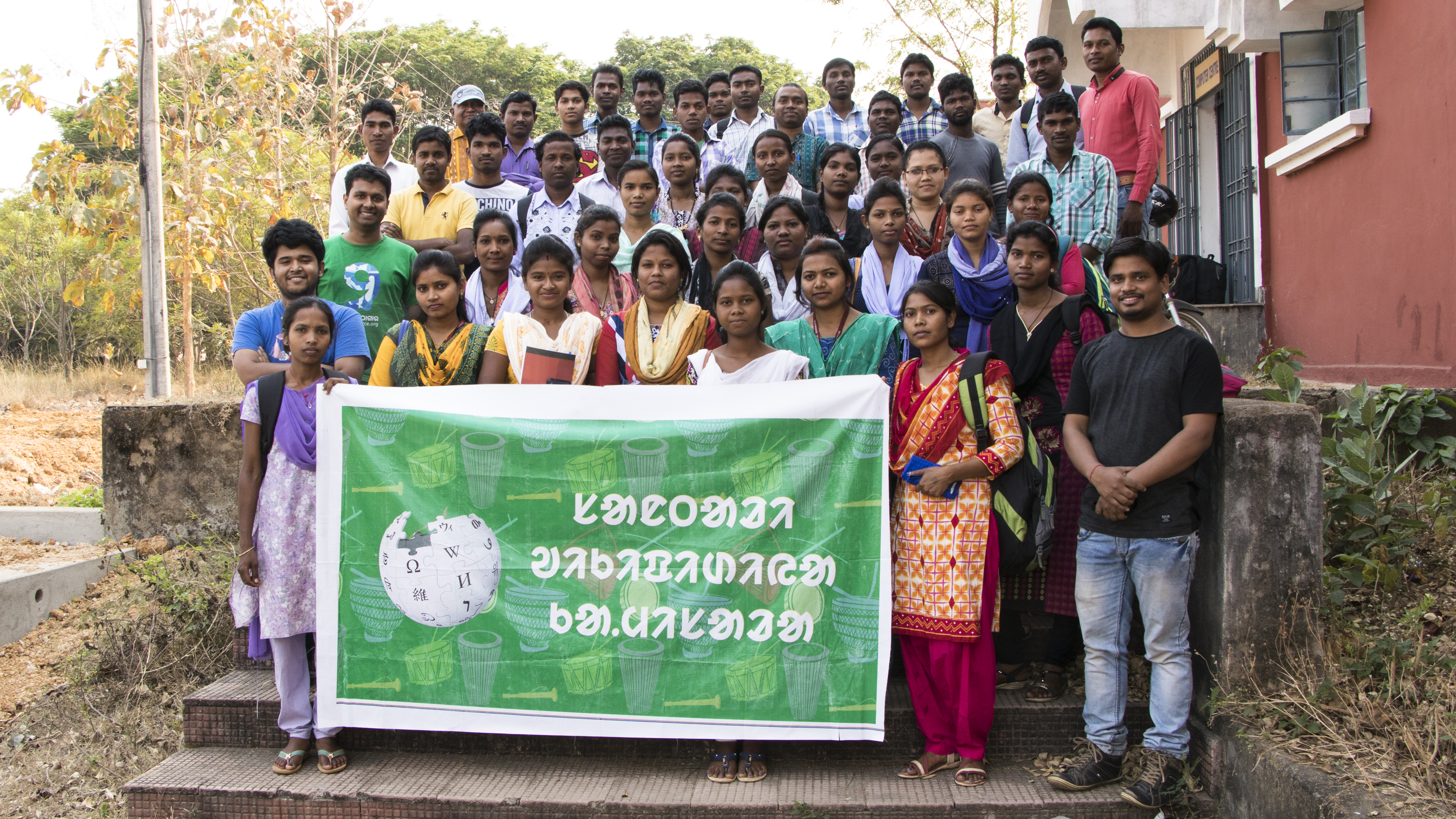
Group picture of Santali Wikipedia workshop in main campus.

Academics
Courses, MSCB University
P.G. & Ph.D. courses, MSCB University
- M.A/ M.Sc. Anthropology and Tribal Studies
- M.Sc. Botany
- M.Sc. Biotechnology
- M.Sc. Chemistry
- Master of Business Administration
- Master of Computer Application
- Master of Social Work
- M.Sc. Computer Science
- M.A. Economics
- M.A. Education
- M.A. English
- M.A. Geology
- Int. B.Ed-M.Ed.
- Master of Library & Infermation Science
- M.Sc./ M.A. Mathematics
- M.Sc. Material Science
- M.A. Odia
- M.Sc. Physics
- M.A History
- M.A Pol. Science
- M.Sc. RS & GIS
- M.A. Sanskrit
- M.A. Santali
- M.Sc. WLBC
- M.Sc./ M.A. Yoga & Naturopathy
- M.Sc. Zoology
- Ph.D. Anthropology
- Ph.D. WLBC
- Ph.D. History
- Ph.D. Pol. Science
- Ph.D. Biotechnology
- Ph.D. Botany
- Ph.D. Chemistry
- Ph.D. Computer-Science & IT
- Ph.D. Economics
- Ph.D. Life-Science
- Ph.D. Material-Science
- Ph.D. Odia
- Ph.D. Physics
- Ph.D. Sanskrit
- Ph.D. Santali
- Ph.D. Zoology

== Gallery ==
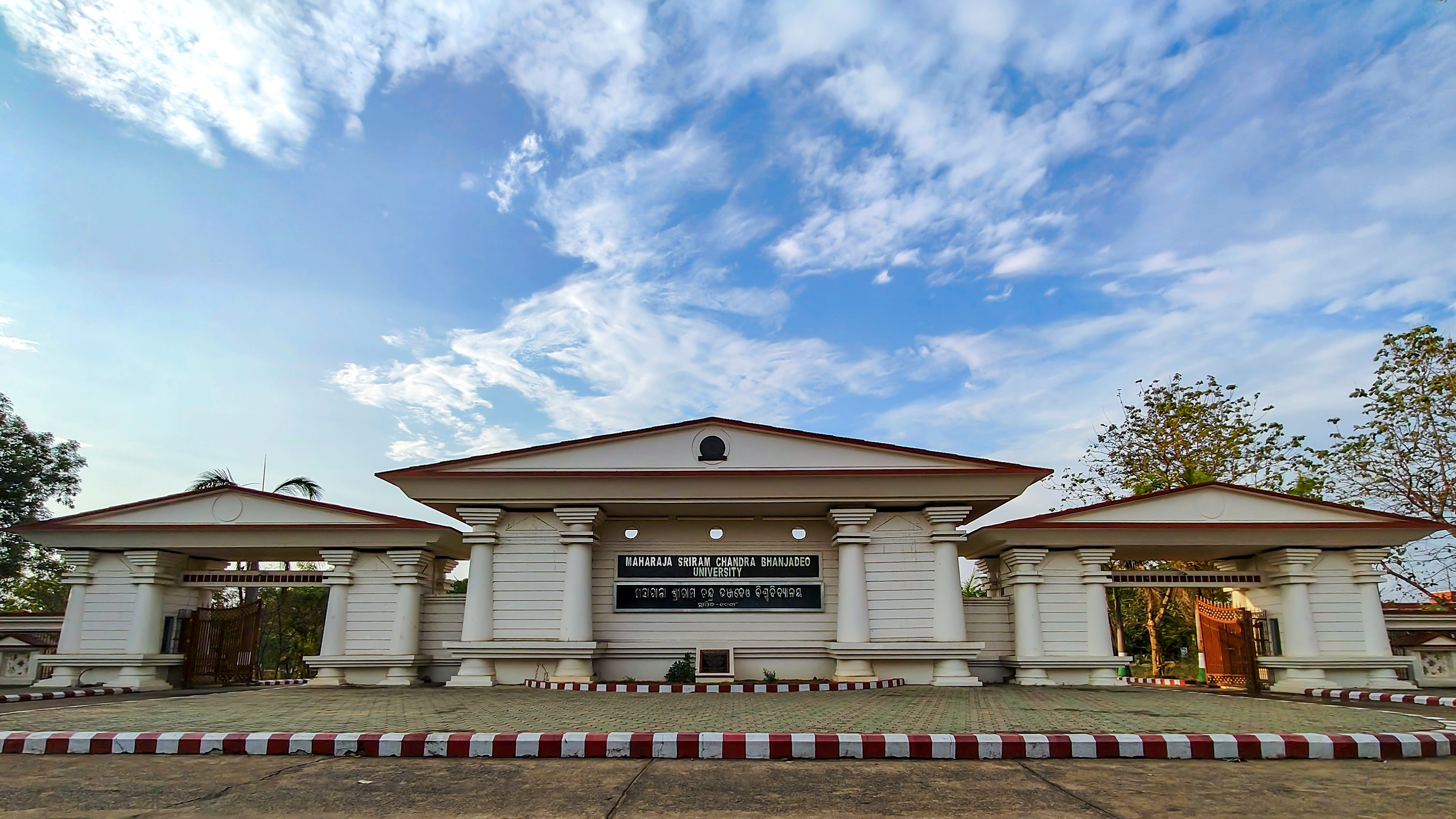
Main gate

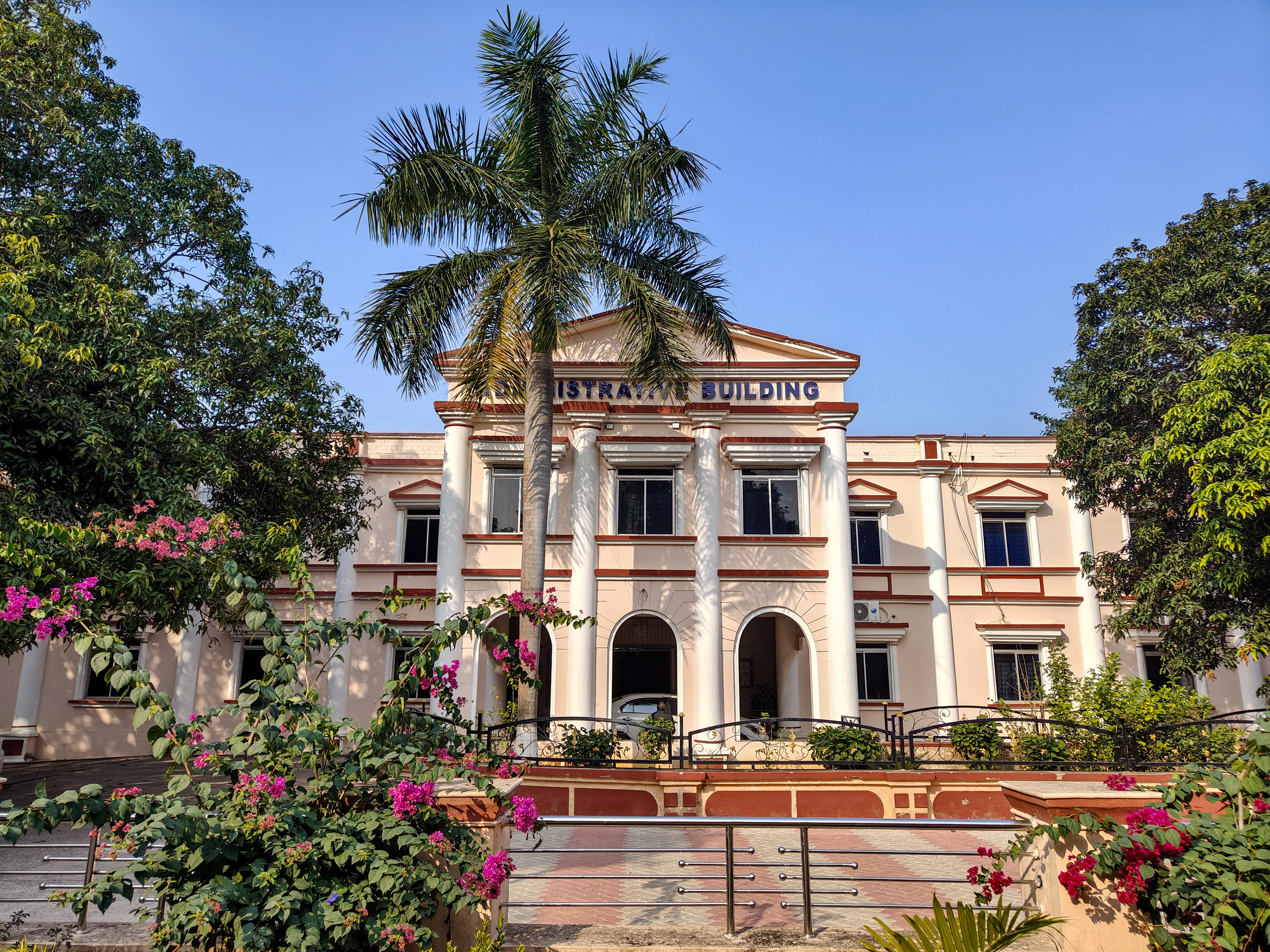
Administrative building

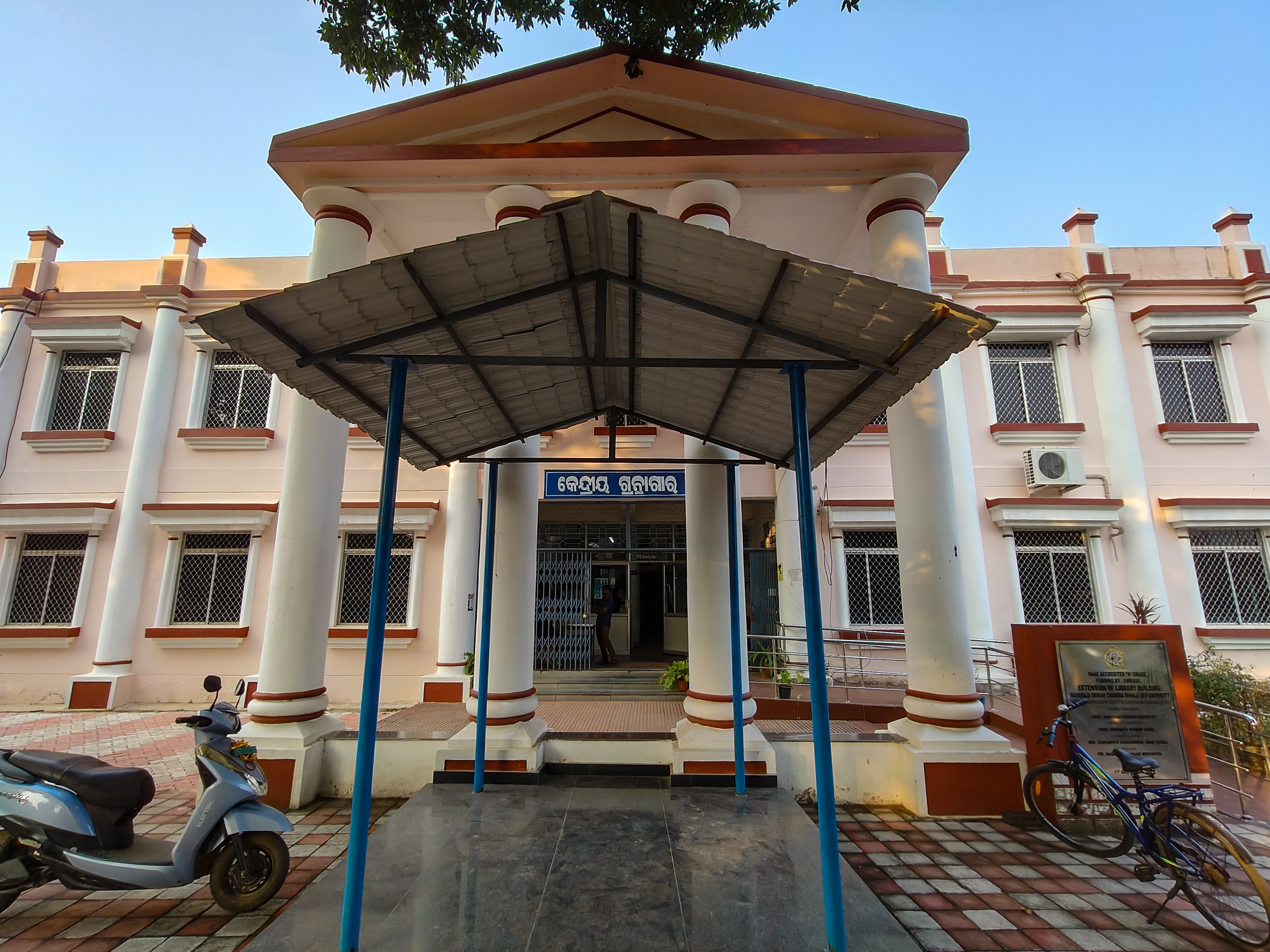
Central library

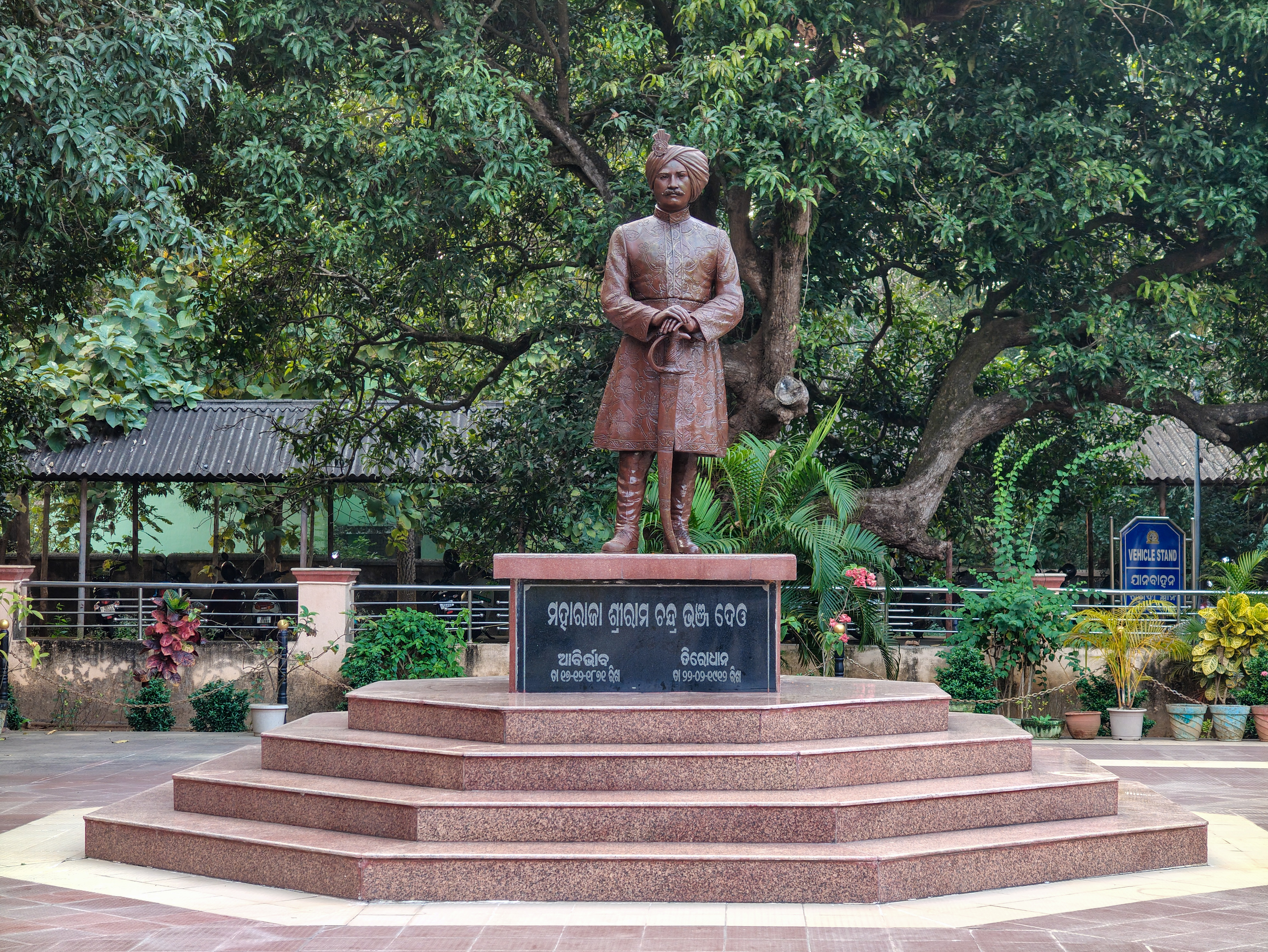
Sculpture

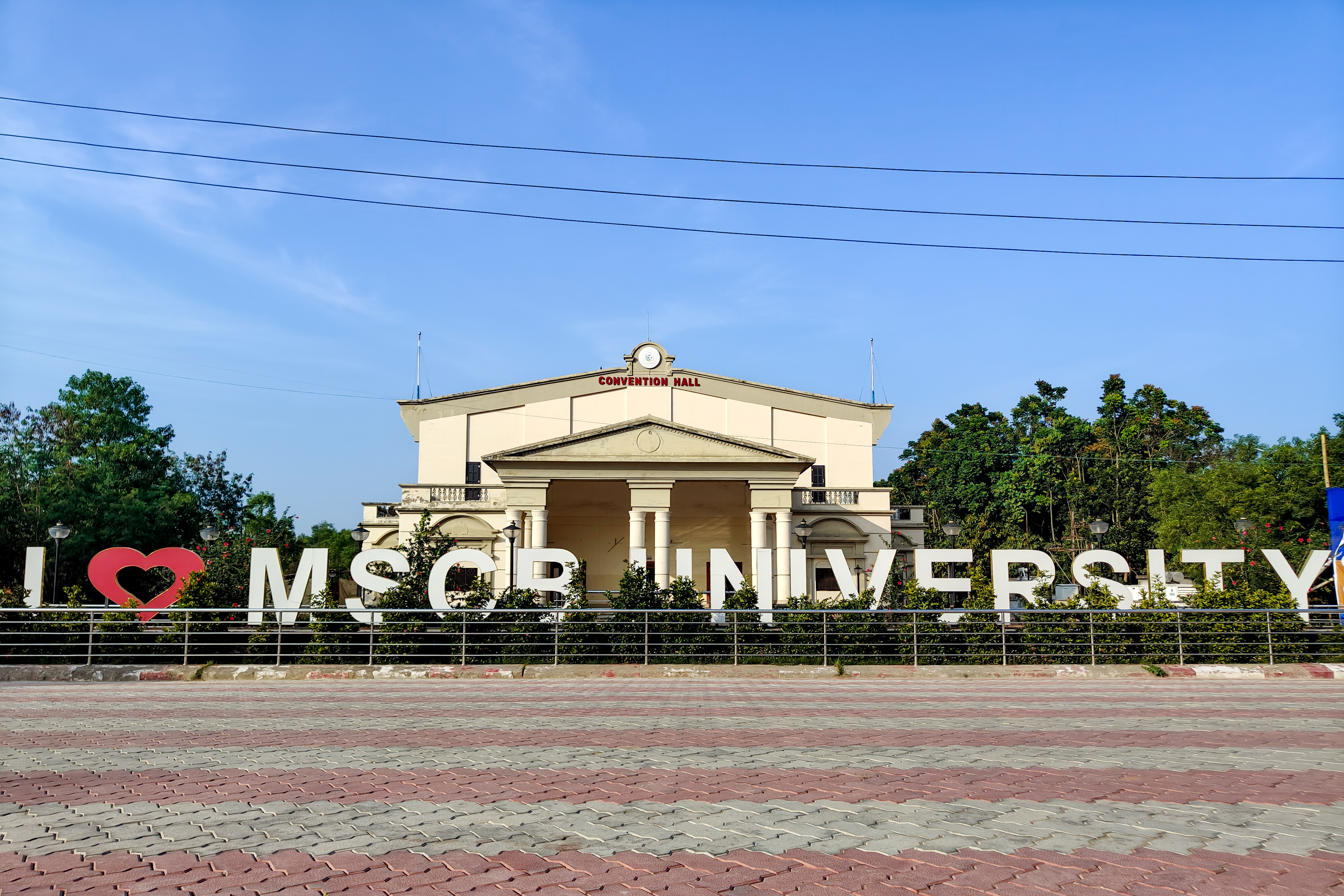
Convention hall

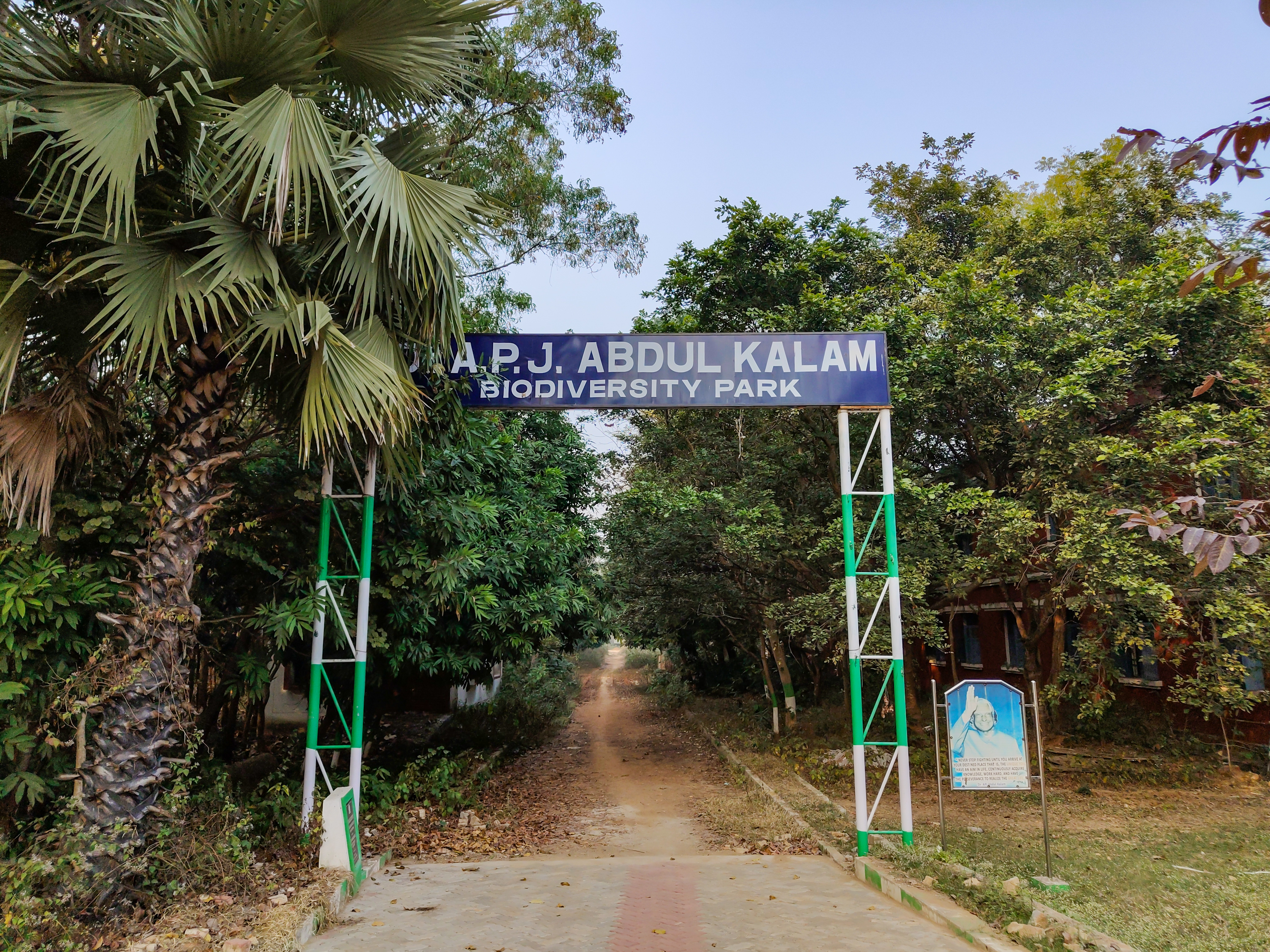
Biodiversity park

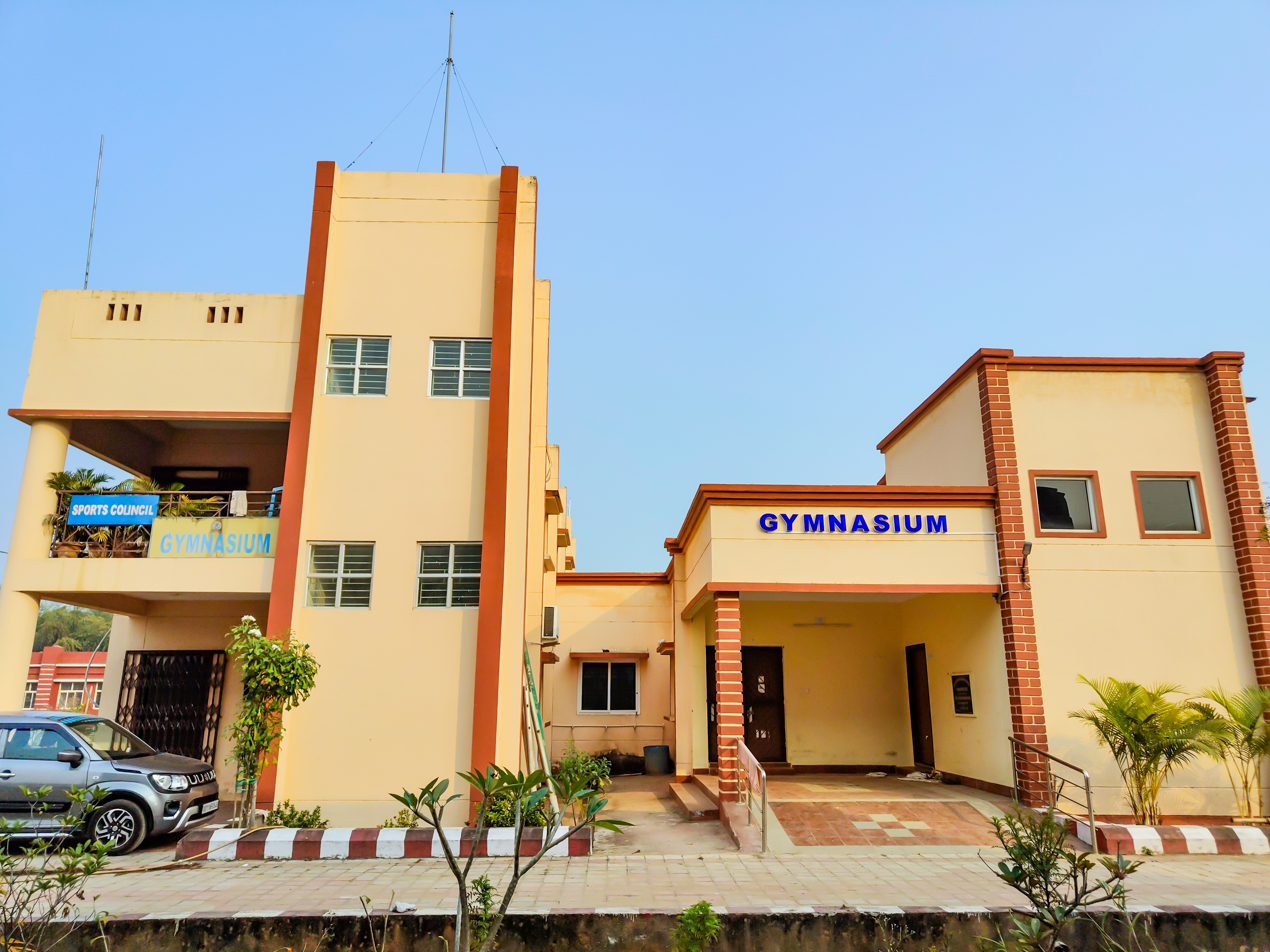
Sports council and gym

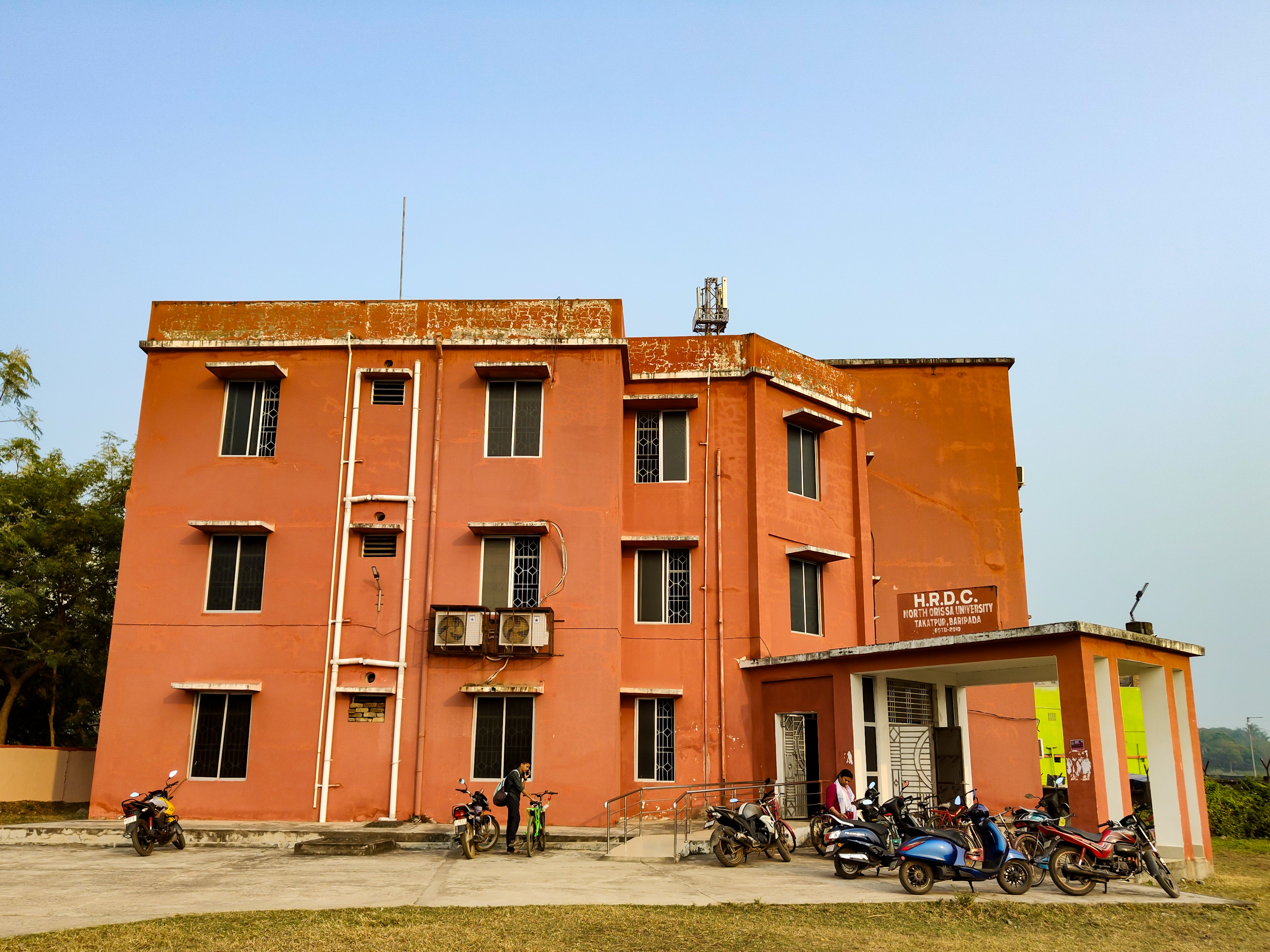
HRDC building

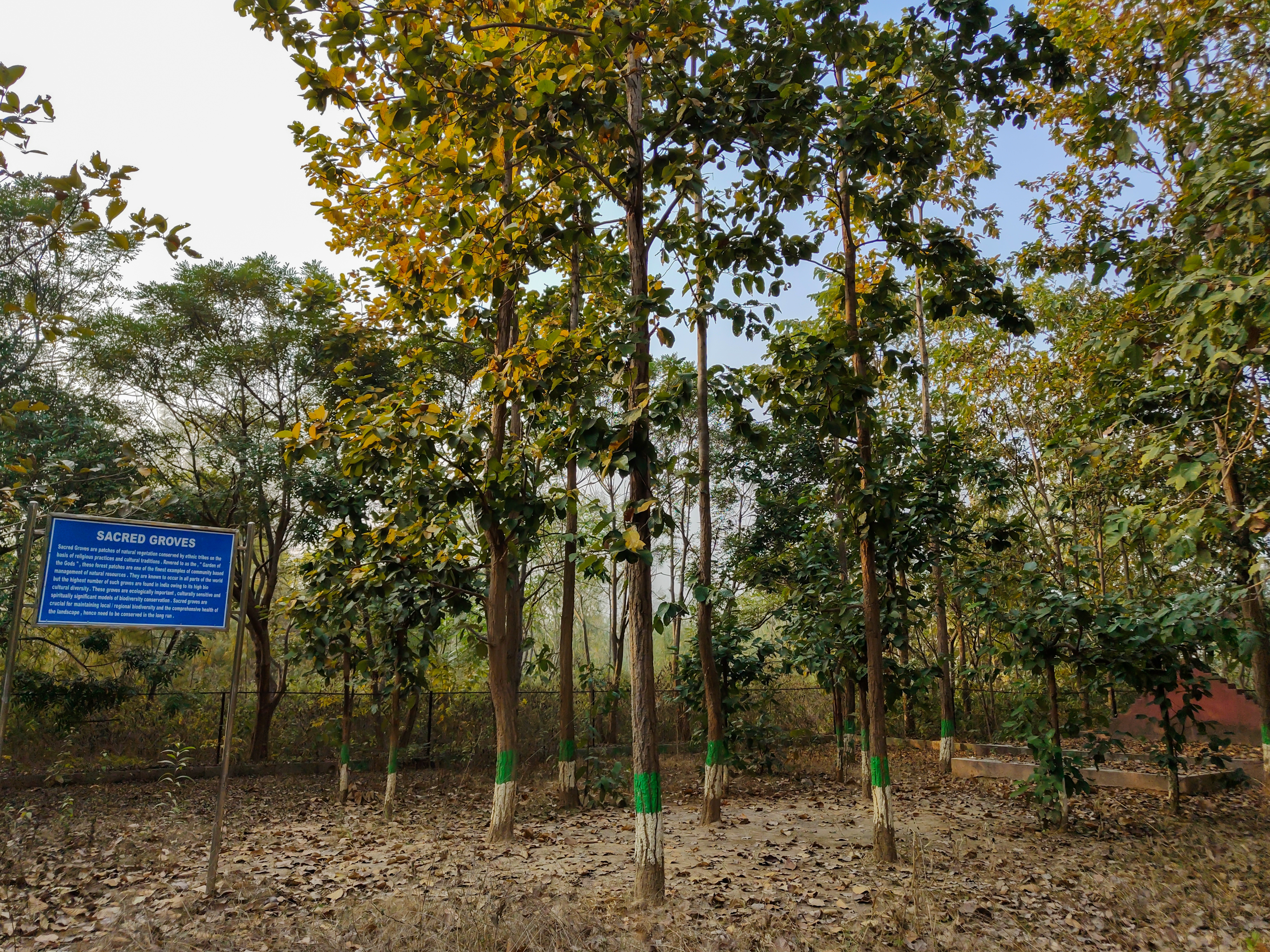
Sacred groves

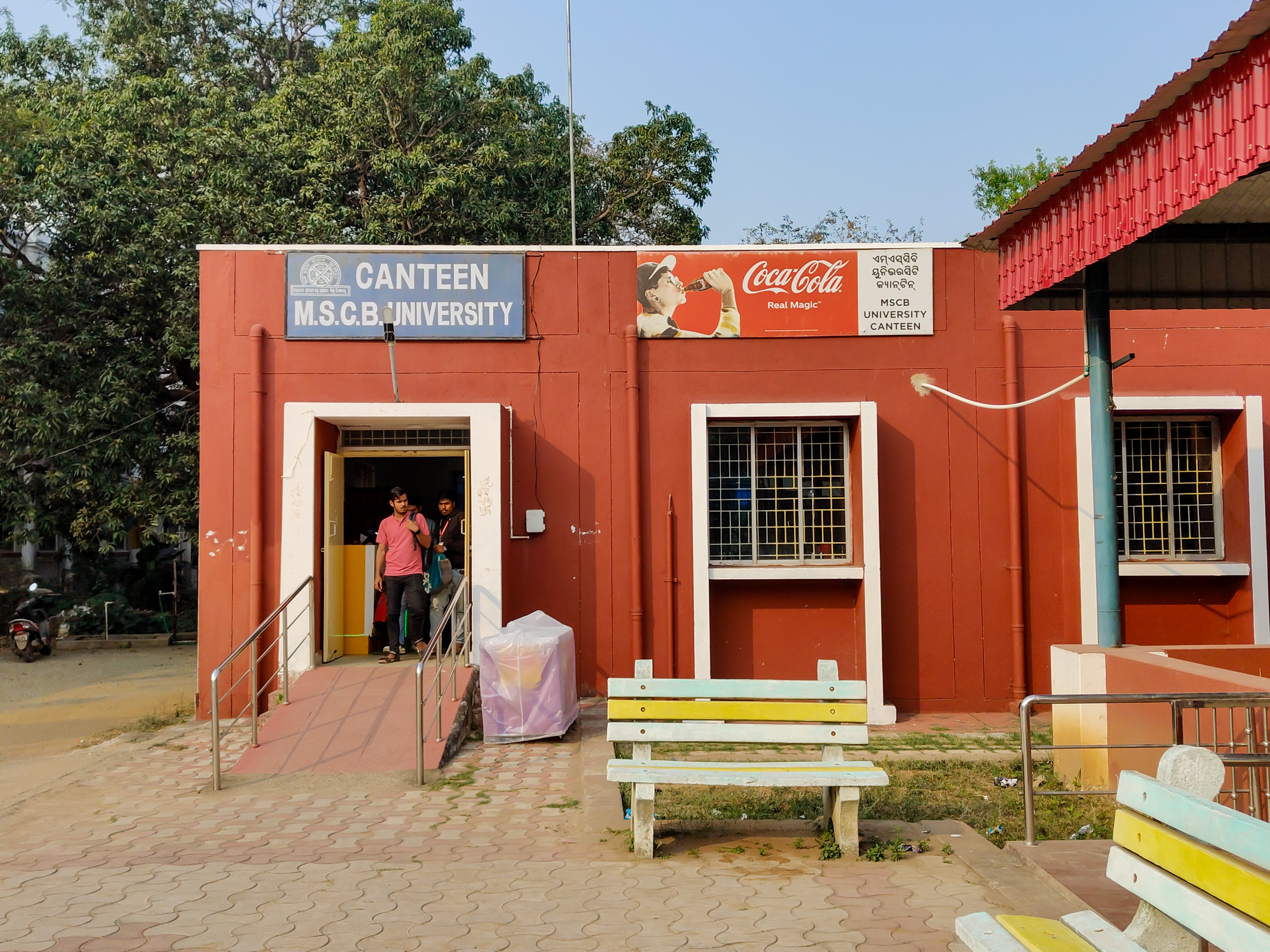
Canteen
