= Pathani Samanta =

Indian astronomer, mathematician and scholar (1835-1904)

Mahamahopadhyaya Chandrasekhara Singha Harichandana Mahapatra Pathani Samanta
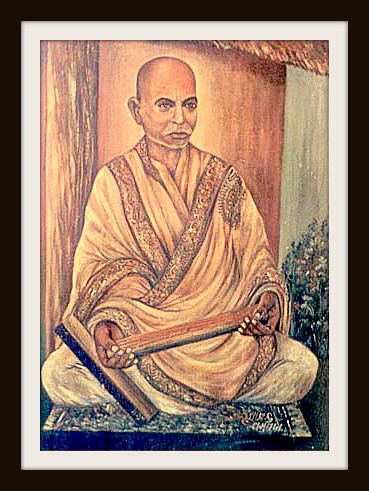
- Born: 13 December 1835; Khandpara State
- Died: 11 June 1904 (aged 67)
- Known for: Astronomy, Mathematics, Astrology

Signature in Siddhanta-Darpana

Pathani Samanta (Note: ପଠାଣି ସାମନ୍ତ; Odia pronunciation: [pɔntʰani samoːntoː]) better known as Mahamahopadhyaya Chandrasekhara Singha Harichandana Mahapatra Samanta, (Note: ମହାମହୋପାଧ୍ୟାୟ ଚନ୍ଦ୍ରଶେଖର ସିଂହ ହରିଚନ୍ଦନ ମହାପାତ୍ର ସାମନ୍ତ; Odia pronunciation: [mɔhamɔhoːpadʰjajɒ t͜ʃɔndroseːkʰɔr siŋho horit͜ʃɔndoːn mɔhapatroː samoːntoː])(13 December 1835 – 11 June 1904) was an Indian astronomer, mathematician and scholar who measured the distance from the Earth to the Sun with a bamboo pipe and traditional instruments. He was born in Purnimanta Pousha Krishna Ashtami, and died in Purnimanta Adhika Jyeshtha Krishna Trayodashi.

His research and observations were compiled into a book called Siddhanta Darpana, which was written in both Sanskrit and the Odia script. He earned the Mahamahopadhyaya Award in 1893, for his usage of traditional instruments for astronomical observations.

== Biography ==
Samanta was born in the princely state of Khandpara, in the Nayagarh district of the Indian state of Odisha. He was the son of Samanta Syamabandhu Singha and Bishnumali Devi. He was born into a royal family.

The legend depicted on the walls of the Pathani Samanta Planetarium in Bhubaneswar states that he was born to a royal couple the loss of many children, leaving them yearning for a healthy child. Hence, soon after his birth, he was given away in adoption to a Muslim fakir to ward off the evil eye, a belief that was strongly prevalent at the time. In remembrance of the fakir and to ward off bad omens, the couple nicknamed their son 'Pathani'.

He went on to study Sanskrit, and later researched traditional Indian astronomy.

During his youth time, Samanta measured the length of the shadows throughout the day by using bamboo and wood to create measuring instruments, which he called mana yantra. He also measured time by using his version of a sundial.

He was the only Indian astronomer who discovered all three irregularities of the moon independently of European astronomers, which were unknown to ancient Indian astronomers. He continued to teach and attracted pupils worldwide despite his persistent health problems and insomnia. On June 11, 1904, he died suddenly from fever and infection.

== Education ==
He was home-schooled by his father, who introduced him to the joys of night star-gazing, and later by a Brahmin teacher, who gave him a basic education in both Odia and Sanskrit. By the age of 15, he had become a self-learner, referring to the books available in the royal library. Samanta was a voracious reader and devoured classical treatises like Lilavati, Bijaganita, Jyotisha, Siddhanta, Vyakarana, and Kavya. It was during this time that he pursued mathematics and traditional astronomy, and started matching predictions made by ancient Indian mathematician-astronomers such as Aryabhatta - 1(476 CE), Varahamihira (503 CE), Brahmagupta (598 CE) and Bhaskara – II (1114 CE) and others, with real observations of celestial objects in the night sky. Although traditional Indian astronomy had veered more toward astrology, focusing more on future predictions based on planetary positions and the preparation of auspicious almanacs for rituals, Samanta focused minutely on the mathematical calculations and observational facts that went into these predictions. When he found discrepancies, he designed his own instruments to measure the phenomena, using everyday materials such as wood and bamboo!

== Instrument maker ==
Samanta was a self-taught astronomer and learned by reading the books available at the Royal Library until age 15. During his research, Samanta designed many of his instruments by using everyday materials such as wooden sticks and bamboo. After studying mathematics and traditional astronomy he used his knowledge to match predictions made by ancient Indian mathematicians and astronomers such as Aryabhata, Varahamihira, and Brahmagupta.

He carried out research in measurements using only a bamboo pipe and two wooden sticks. His findings were recorded in his book titled Siddhanta Darpana and were mentioned in the European and American press in 1899. Samanta's calculations were eventually used in the preparation of almanacs in Odisha.

== Working With Wood & Bamboo ==
The treatises Samanta was referring to had only clues to the observational devices used, so he decided to make his own measuring instruments made of locally available bamboo and wood. They used basic geometry and trigonometry to calculate distance, height, and time. There are many local tales of Samanta measuring the height at which birds fly, finding the height of trees, and persons using the length of shadows and calculating the distance and height of mountains from his fixed location using an instrument he invented called mana yantra.

He used his own versions of the sundial and imprsundialater clocks to measure time. There are a few sketches of these instruments from the article published by Prof P.C. Naik and Prof. L Satpathy in the Bulletin of the Astronomical Society of India (1998) available today.

== Awards & Recognition ==
Samanta received the title "Harichandan Mahapatra" from the Gajapati King of Puri in 1870, and the revered Jagannath Temple in Puri still adheres to the calendar rules he suggested for carrying out its ceremonies. The British government, which ruled India during Samanta's lifetime, conferred upon him the title of 'Mahamahopadhyay' in 1893 and awarded him a pension of Rs 50 per month for his contributions to astronomy after he correctly predicted the time and place of a solar eclipse that was visible only in Britain.

== Personal life and legacy ==
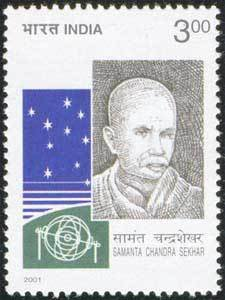
Stamp of India - 2001 Samanta Chandra Sekhar

Samanta married Sita Devi, the daughter of King Anugul, in 1857 in a rather dramatic way after the bride's family rejected the alliance on the couple's wedding day because Samanta didn't look princely enough, according to his family history, which was written by his grandson Raghunath Singh Samanta and published in the book "Pathani Samanta Jeebani Darpana". He reportedly won over the bride's family at the wedding with his faultless sloka recitation.

Govt of India have issued a commemorative postage stamp on Samanta Chandra Sekhar in the year 2001. Odisha has kept his legacy relevant by displaying his work in the state museum, naming the planetarium in Bhubaneswar after him; and dedicating educational institutions, scholarships, and amateur astronomy clubs to his memory. Annual Samanta Chandra Sekhar Award has been instituted by the Odisha Bigyan Academy, in the year 1987, to recognise outstanding scientists of Odisha-origin, working inside or outside Odisha. Similarly, Samanta Chandrasekhar Jyotirbigyani Sanman (SCJS) has also been instituted by the Samanta Chandrasekhar Amateur Astronomers Association (SCAAA). Dr Nikhil Mohan Pattnaik, Dr Prahallad Chandra Naik and Dr Ananda Hota have been conferred this SCJS award in its inaugural year 2018 which was also the silver jubilee year of SCAAA. Every year, since 2007, Tata Steel, in collaboration with the Pathani Samanta Planetarium under the Science & Technology Department of the Government of Odisha, organises the Young Astronomer Talent Search (YATS). High school students from each and every district of Odisha participate which can make the total number of participants reach up to 76,600 in a single year. At the final stage of YATS, around the birth anniversary of Pathani Samanta (13th December), winners are awarded at a function in the state capital Bhubaneswar, usually by the Chief Minister of the state, and a few reputed scientists or technologists are invited to inspire the young students for a career in astronomy and space-science.

Astronomers and astrophysicists both in India and beyond have praised his work, earning him the moniker "Indian Tycho." However, the general public is mostly unaware of this brilliant astronomer who observed the universe with only the naked eye, as well as of the incredible scientific advances he accomplished with only a few pieces of bamboo and wood and the sheer force of his brilliance. He deserves to be celebrated just like Aryabhatta, Bhaskara, and others - probably as the last torch bearer of the Indian traditional astronomy.

== Bibliography ==
- Satpathy, L., ed. (2003). "Samanta Chandra Sekhar and his Contributions to Ancient Indian Astronomy.". Ancient Indian Astronomy and Contributions of Samanta Chandra Sekhar. ISBN 9788173194320.
- Sriram, M. S.; Ramasubramanian, K.; Srinivas, M. D. (2002). "Samanta Chandra Sekhara and His Treatise Siddhantadarpana.". 500 years of Tantrasangraha: a landmark in the history of astronomy. p. 127. ISBN 9788179860090.
