= List of institutions of higher education in Odisha =

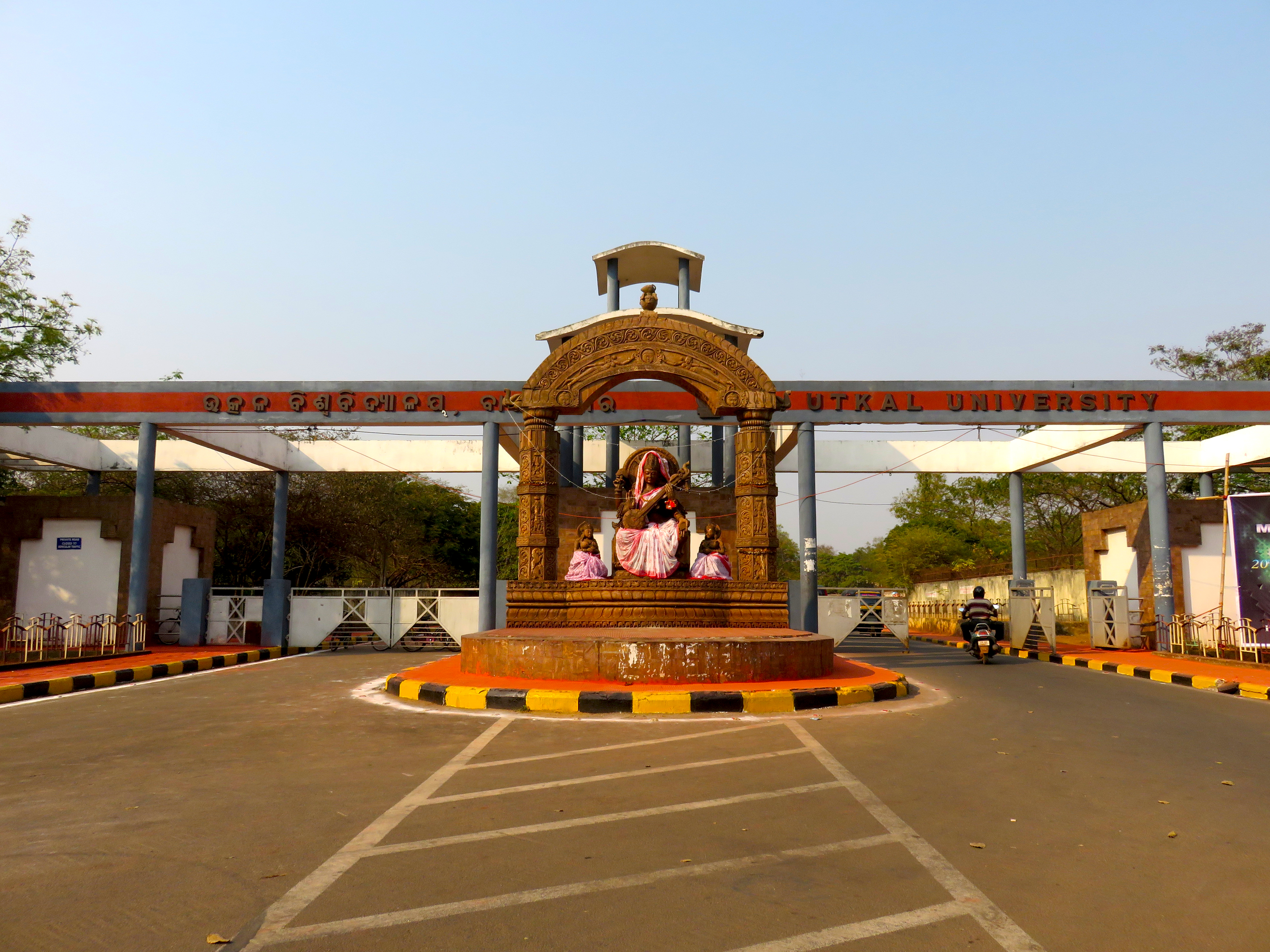
Entrance to Utkal University, the mother university in Odisha

== Institutes of National Importance ==
| University name | Location | Specialization | Estd. | Weblink |
|---|---|---|---|---|
| Indian Institute of Technology (IIT) | Bhubaneswar | Engineering | 2008 | www.iitbbs.ac.in |
| National Institute of Technology (NIT) | Rourkela | Engineering | 1961 | www.nitrkl.ac.in |
| Indian Institute of Management (IIM) | Sambalpur | Management | 2015 | iimsambalpur.ac.in |
| All India Institute of Medical Sciences (AIIMS) | Bhubaneswar | Medical | 2012 | aiimsbhubaneswar.nic.in |
| National Institute of Science Education and Research (NISER) | Bhubaneswar | Research and Education | 2007 | www.niser.ac.in |
| Indian Institute of Science Education and Research (IISER) | Brahmapur | Research and Education | 2016 | www.iiserbpr.ac.in |

== Central Universities ==
| University name | Location | Support | Specialization | Estd. | Weblink |
|---|---|---|---|---|---|
| Central University of Odisha | Koraput | Ministry of Education (India) | Humanities, sciences | 2009 | cuo.ac.in |
| Central Sanskrit University (Shri Sadashiv Campus) | Puri | Ministry of Education (India) | Sanskrit | 1971 | www.csu-puri.edu.in |

== State Universities ==
| University name | Location | District | Support | Specialization | Estd. | Weblink |
|---|---|---|---|---|---|---|
| Berhampur University | Brahmapur | Ganjam district | State | General | 1967 | www.bamu.nic.in |
| Biju Patnaik University of Technology | Rourkela | Sundargarh district | State | Engineering and Technology | 2002 | www.bput.ac.in |
| Dharanidhar University | Keonjhar | Keonjhar district | State | General | 1957 | dduniversity.ac.in |
| Fakir Mohan University | Balasore | Balasore district | State | General | 1999 | www.fmuniversity.nic.in |
| Gangadhar Meher University | Sambalpur | Sambalpur district | State | General | 1944 | www.gmuniversity.ac.in |
| IIIT Bhubaneswar | Bhubaneswar | Khordha district | State | Engineering and Technology | 2014 | www.iiit-bh.ac.in |
| Khallikote Unitary University | Brahmapur | Ganjam district | State | General | 2021 | www.kuu.ac.in |
| Maa Manikeshwari University | Bhawanipatna | Kalahandi district | State | General | 1960 | www.kalahandiuniversity.ac.in |
| Madhusudan Law University | Cuttack | Cuttack district | State | Law | 1869 | www.mlu.ac.in |
| Maharaja Sriram Chandra Bhanja Deo University | Baripada | Mayurbhanj district | State | General | 1998 | www.nou.nic.in |
| National Law University Odisha | Cuttack | Cuttack district | State | Law | 2009 | www.nluo.ac.in |
| Odia University | Satyabadi | Puri district | State | Language | 2024 | www.odiauniversity.ac.in/en |
| Odisha State Open University | Sambalpur | Sambalpur district | State | Open | 2015 | www.osou.ac.in |
| Odisha University of Agriculture and Technology | Bhubaneswar | Khordha district | State | Agriculture and Technology | 1962 | www.ouat.nic.in |
| Odisha University of Health Sciences | Bhubaneswar | Khordha district | State | Medical Science | 2023 | www.ouhs.ac.in |
| Odisha University of Technology and Research | Bhubaneswar | Khordha district | State | Engineering and Technology | 1981 | www.outr.ac.in |
| Rajendra University | Balangir | Balangir district | State | General | 1944 | www.rajendrauniversity.ac.in |
| Rama Devi Women's University | Bhubaneswar | Khordha district | State | General | 1964 | rdwu.ac.in |
| Ravenshaw University | Cuttack | Cuttack district | State | General | 1868 | www.revenshawuniversity.ac.in |
| Sambalpur University | Burla | Sambalpur district | State | General | 1967 | www.suniv.ac.in |
| Shree Jagannath Sanskrit University | Puri | Puri district | State | Sanskrit | 1981 | www.sjsv.niv.in |
| Utkal University | Bhubaneswar | Khordha district | State | General | 1943 | www.utkaluniversity.nic.in |
| Utkal University of Culture | Bhubaneswar | Khordha district | State | Culture | 1999 | www.uuc.ac.in |
| Veer Surendra Sai University of Technology | Burla | Sambalpur district | State | Engineering and Technology | 1956 | www.vssut.ac.in |
| Vikram Dev University | Jeypore | Koraput district | State | General | 1947 | www.vikramdevuniversity.ac.in |

== Deemed Universities ==
| University name | Location | District | Support | Specialization | Estd. | Weblink |
|---|---|---|---|---|---|---|
| Indian Institute of Mass Communication | Dhenkanal | Dhenkanal district | Ministry of Information and Broadcasting (India) | Journalism | 1993 | iimc.gov.in/dhenkanal-Odisha-about-us |
| Kalinga Institute of Industrial Technology | Bhubaneswar | Khordha district | Private | Engineering and Management | 1992 | www.kiit.ac.in |
| Kalinga Institute of Social Sciences | Bhubaneswar | Khordha district | Private | General | 2017 | university.kiss.ac.in |
| Siksha "O" Anusandhan | Bhubaneswar | Khordha district | Private | Engineering and Management | 1996 | www.soa.ac.in |

== Private Universities ==
| University name | Location | District | Support | Specialization | Estd. | Weblink |
|---|---|---|---|---|---|---|
| AIPH University | Bhubaneswar | Khordha district | Private | Public Health | 2018 | www.aiph.ac.in |
| ASBM University | Bhubaneswar | Khordha district | Private | Commerce and Management | 2006 | www.asbm.ac.in |
| Birla Global University | Bhubaneswar | Khordha district | Private | Commerce and Management | 2013 | www.bgu.ac.in |
| C. V. Raman Global University | Bhubaneswar | Khordha district | Private | Technology and Management | 2020 | www.cgu-odisha.ac.in |
| Centurion University of Technology & Management | Bhubaneswar | Khordha district | Private | Technology and Management | 2010 | www.cutm.ac.in |
| DRIEMS University | Cuttack | Cuttack district | Private | Technology, Management and Health Sciences | 2023 | www.driems.ac.in |
| GIET University | Gunupur | Rayagada district | Private | Technology and Management | 1997 | www.giet.edu |
| Jagadguru Kripalu University | Cuttack | Cuttack district | Private | General | 2020 | www.jkuniversity.in |
| NIST University | Brahmapur | Ganjam district | Private | Technology | 2024 | www.nist.edu |
| Silicon University | Bhubaneswar | Khordha district | Private | Technology | 2024 | www.silicon.ac.in |
| Sri Sri University | Cuttack | Cuttack district | Private | General | 2009 | www.srisriuniversity.edu.in |
| XIM University | Bhubaneswar | Khordha district | Private | Commerce and Management | 2013 | www.xim.edu.in |

== Autonomous Institutes ==
| Institute Name | Location | Support | Specialization | Estd. | Weblink |
|---|---|---|---|---|---|
| Biju Patnaik National Steel | Puri | Ministry of Steel | Steel Technology | 2001 | www.bpnsi.org |
| Institute of Chemical Technology | Bhubaneswar | Ministry of Human Resources Development | Chemical Engineering and Pharmaceutical Sciences | 2018 | iocb.ictmumbai.edu.in |
| International Institute of Information Technology | Bhubaneswar | State | Information Technology | 2004 | www.iiit-bh.ac.in |
| Institute of Life Sciences | Bhubaneswar | Ministry of Science and Technology (India) | Cancer Biology, Infectious Disease and Plant Biotechnology | 1989 | www.ils.res.in |
| Indian Institute of Handloom Technology | Bargarh | Ministry of Textiles | Handloom | 2008 | www.iihtbargarh.org.in |
| Indian Institute of Mass Communication | Dhenkanal | Ministry of Information and Broadcasting (India) | Journalism | 1993 | www.iimc.gov.in |
| Institute of Mathematics and Applications | Bhubaneswar | State | Mathematics | 1999 | iomaorissa.ac.in |
| Institute of Minerals and Materials Technology | Bhubaneswar | Ministry of Science and Technology (India) | Mineralogy and Materials engineering | 1964 | www.immt.res.in |
| Indian Institute of Public Health | Bhubaneswar | Private | Public Health | 2010 | phfi.org/iiph-bhubaneswar/ |
| Institute of Physics | Bhubaneswar | Department of Atomic Energy | Physics | 1972 | phfi.org/iiph-bhubaneswar/ |
| Indian Institute of Tourism and Travel Management | Bhubaneswar | Ministry of Tourism (India) | Tourism | 1983 | www.iopb.res.in |
| National Institute of Fashion Technology | Bhubaneswar | Ministry of Textiles | Fashion Technology | 2010 | www.nift.ac.in/bhubaneswar/ |
| National Institute of Science Education and Research | Jatani | Department of Atomic Energy | Sciences | 2007 | www.niser.ac.in |
| National Law University Odisha | Cuttack | State | Law | 2008 | nluo.ac.in |
| Swami Vivekanand National Institute of Rehabilitation Training and Research | Olatapur | Ministry of Social Justice and Empowerment | Health Sciences | 1975 | www.svnirtar.nic.in |
| Central Institute of Freshwater Aquaculture | Cuttack | Ministry of Agriculture and Farmers' Welfare | Freshwater Aquaculture | 1987 | cifa.nic.in |
| National Rice Research Institute | Cuttack | Ministry of Agriculture and Farmers' Welfare | Agriculture | 1946 | icar-nrri.in |
| Indian Institute of Water Management | Bhubaneswar | Ministry of Agriculture and Farmers' Welfare | Water Management | 1988 | iiwm.icar.gov.in |
| National Institute of Foot and Mouth Disease | Bhubaneswar | Ministry of Agriculture and Farmers' Welfare | Research on foot and mouth disease | 1968 | nifmd.icar.gov.in |
| Central Institute for Women in Agriculture | Bhubaneswar | Ministry of Agriculture and Farmers' Welfare | Agricultural Sciences, Life Sciences & Biotechnology | 1996 | icar-ciwa.org.in |
| Central Tuber Crops Research Institute - Regional Centre | Bhubaneswar | Ministry of Agriculture and Farmers' Welfare | Agricultural Sciences | 1976 | www.ctcri.org/index.php |
| Central Tool Room and Training Centre, Bhubaneswar | Bhubaneswar | Ministry of Micro, Small and Medium Enterprises | Micro, Small and Medium Enterprises | 1992 | www.cttc.gov.in |
| Regional Medical Research Centre, Bhubaneswar | Bhubaneswar | Ministry of Health and Family Welfare | Medical Research | 1981 | www.rmrcbbsr.gov.in |
| Institute Of Hotel Management Catering Technology And Applied Nutrition | Bhubaneswar | Ministry of Tourism (India) | Hotel Management & Catering Technology | 1973 | www.ihmbbs.org/index.php |
| Regional Research Institute (H) | Puri | Ministry of Ayush | Homeopathy Research | 1980 | ccrhindia.ayush.gov.in/our-network/regional-research-institute/rri-puri |

== Medical Colleges and Hospitals ==
=== Government ===
| College name | Location | District |
|---|---|---|
| Acharya Harihar Post Graduate Institute of Cancer | Cuttack | Cuttack district |
| All India Institute of Medical Sciences | Bhubaneswar | Khordha district |
| Bhima Bhoi Medical College and Hospital | Balangir | Balangir district |
| Dharanidhar Medical College and Hospital | Kendujhar | Kendujhar district |
| Fakir Mohan Medical College and Hospital | Balasore | Balasore district |
| Government Medical College and Hospital, Sundargarh | Sundargarh | Sundargarh district |
| Government Medical College and Hospital | Phulbani | Kandhamal district |
| Maharaja Jajati Keshri Medical College and Hospital | Jajpur | Jajpur district |
| Maharaja Krushna Chandra Gajapati Medical College and Hospital | Brahmapur | Ganjam district |
| Pabitra Mohan Pradhan Medical College and Hospital | Talcher | Angul district |
| Pandit Raghunath Murmu Medical College and Hospital | Baripada | Mayurbhanj district |
| PGIMER and Capital Hospital | Bhubaneswar | Khordha district |
| Saheed Laxman Nayak Medical College and Hospital | Koraput | Koraput district |
| Saheed Rendo Majhi Medical College and Hospital | Bhawanipatna | Kalahandi district |
| Sri Jagannath Medical College and Hospital | Puri | Puri district |
| Srirama Chandra Bhanja Medical College and Hospital | Cuttack | Cuttack district |
| Veer Surendra Sai Institute of Medical Sciences and Research | Burla | Sambalpur district |

=== Private ===
- Hi-Tech Medical College & Hospital, Bhubaneswar
- Hi-Tech Medical College & Hospital, Rourkela
- Institute of Medical Sciences and Sum Hospital of Siksha 'O' Anusandhan, Bhubaneswar
- Ispat Post Graduate Institute and Super Specialty Hospital, Rourkela
- Kalinga Institute of Medical Sciences, Bhubaneswar

=== Ayurvedic Colleges and Hospitals ===
==== Government ====
- Gopabandhu Ayurveda Mahavidyalaya, Puri
- Govt. Ayurvedic College and Hospital, Balangir
- Kaviraj Ananta Tripathy Sharma Ayurvedic College & Hospital, Brahmapur

==== Private ====
- Indira Gandhi Memorial Ayurvedic College & Hospital, Bhubaneswar
- Mayurbhanj Ayurveda Mahavidyalaya, Baripada
- Sri Sri Nrusingha Nath Ayurved College & Research Institute, Paikmal

=== Homeopathic Colleges and Hospitals ===
==== Government ====
- Dr. Avirna Chandra Homeopathic Medical College & Hospital, Bhubaneswar
- Odisha Medical College of Homeopathy & Research, Sambalpur
- Biju Pattnaik Homeopathic Medical College & Hospital, Brahmapur
- Utkalmani Homeopathic Medical College & Hospital, Rourkela

==== Private ====
- Mayurbhanj Homeopathic Medical College & Hospital, Baripada
- Cuttack Homeopathic Medical College & Hospital, Cuttack

=== Government ===
- S.C.B. Dental College and Hospital, Cuttack

=== Private ===
- Hi-Tech Dental College and hospital, Bhubaneswar
- Institute of Dental Sciences, Bhubaneswar
- Kalinga Institute of Dental Sciences, Bhubaneswar

== Pharmacy Colleges ==
Government Colleges/University

1. University Department of Pharmaceutical Sciences, Utkal University, Vani Vihar, Bhubaneswar

Private Colleges

1. College Of Pharmaceutical Sciences, Tamando, Bhubaneswar
2. College Of Pharmaceutical Sciences, Mohuda, Brahmapur
3. College Of Pharmaceutical Sciences, Baliguali, Puri
4. Dadhichi College Of Pharmacy, Sundargram, Cuttack
5. Gayatri College Of Pharmacy, Jamadarpali, Sambalpur
6. Gayatri Institute Of Science And Technology
7. Hitech College Of Pharmacy
8. Indira Gandhi Institute of Pharmaceutical Sciences, Bhubaneswar
9. Institute of Health Sciences Bhubaneswar
10. Institute Of Pharmacy And Technology, Salipur
11. IMT Pharmacy College, Puri
12. Jeypore College Of Pharmacy
13. Soum Jena College Of Pharmacy & Medical Science, Cuttack
14. Kanak Manjari Institute of Pharmaceutical Sciences, Rourkela
15. Roland Institute Of Pharmaceutical Sciences, Brahmapur, Odisha
16. Royal College Of Pharmacy & Health Sciences
17. Seemanta Institute Of Pharmaceutical Sciences
18. Sri Jayadev College of Pharmaceutical Sciences, Bhubaneswar

== Rehabilitative Science ==
- Swami Vivekanand National Institute of Rehabilitation Training and Research
- International Institute of Rehabilitation Sciences and Research

== Engineering Colleges ==
=== Autonomous ===
- Indira Gandhi Institute of Technology, Sarang (Govt.)
- The Institution of Electronics & Telecommunication Engineers, Bhubaneswar

=== Government ===
- Central Institute of Plastic Engineering and Technology, Bhubaneswar
- Government College of Engineering, Keonjhar
- Government College of Engineering, Kalahandi, Bhawanipatna
- Indira Gandhi Institute of Technology, Sarang
- Parala Maharaja Engineering College, PMEC, Berhampur
- Utkalmani Gopabandhu Institute of Engineering, Rourkela
- Veer Surendra Sai University of Technology, Burla
- Sambalpur University Institute of Information Technology, Burla

=== Private ===
- Ajay Binay Institute of Technology, Cuttack
- Aryan Institute of Engineering and Technology, Bhubaneswar
- Balasore College of Engineering & Technology, Balasore
- Bhadrak Institute of Engineering & Technology, Bhadrak
- Bhadrak Engineering school for Technology
- Barrister Ranjit Mohanty Group of Institution, Bhubaneswar
- College Of Engineering Bhubaneswar (CEB), Bhubaneshwar
- Eastern Academy of Science and Technology, Bhubaneswar
- Gandhi Institute of Advanced Computer & Research, Rayagada
- Gandhi Institute of Science & Technology(GIST), Rayagada
- KMBB College of Engineering & Technology, Bhubaneswar
- Gandhi Institute for Education & Technology, Bhubaneswar
- Gandhi Institute for Technology, Bhubaneswar
- Ghanashyama Hemalata Institute of Technology and Management, Puri
- Gopal Krushna College of Engineering & Technology, Jeypore
- Indus College of Engineering Bhubaneswar
- Kalam Institute of Technology, Berhampur
- Konark Institute of Science and Technology, Bhubaneswar
- Krupajal Engineering College, Bhubaneswar
- Mahavir Institute of Engineering and Technology, Bhubaneswar
- Majhighariani Institute of Technology and Science (MITS), Raygada
- Modern Institute of Technology and Management, Bhubaneswar
- NM Institute of Engineering and Technology, Bhubaneswar
- Orissa Engineering College, Bhubaneswar
- Orissa School of Mining Engineering, Keonjhar
- Padmanava College of Engineering, Rourkela
- Purushottam Institute of Engineering and Technology] Rourkela
- Roland Institute of Technology, Berhampur
- Sanjay Memorial Institute of Technology, Berhampur
- Seemanta Engineering College, Jharpokharia (Mayurbhanj)
- Synergy Institute of Engineering & Technology (SIET), Dhenkanal
- Trident Academy of Technology (TAT), Bhubaneswar

== Management Colleges ==
- Affinity Business School, Bhubaneswar
- Asian School of Business Management, Bhubaneswar
- Asian Workers Development Institute, Rourkela
- Centre for IT Education, Bhubaneswar
- IIPM School of Management, Rourkela
- IMI Bhubaneswar
- Indian Institute of Management, Sambalpur
- Indian Institute for Production Management, Kansbahal
- Institute of Management and Information Technology, Cuttack
- Regional College of Management, Bhubaneswar
- Rourkela Institute of Management Studies, Rourkela
- Xavier Institute of Management, Bhubaneswar (XIMB)

== Law Colleges ==
- KIIT School of Law, Bhubaneswar
- Bhadrak Law College, Bhadrak
- Balasore Law College, Balasore
- Capital Law College, Bhubaneswar
- Dhenkanal Law College, Dhenkanal
- Gangadhar Mohapatra Law College, Puri
- Ganjam Law College, Brahmapur
- ICSS College Bhadrak
- Lajpat Rai Law College, Sambalpur
- Lingaraj Law College, Brahmapur
- Mayurbhanj Law College, Mayurbhanj
- Pravash Manjari Law College, Keonjhar
- Rourkela Law College, Rourkela
- Xavier Law School, Bhubaneswar

== Autonomous/Degree Colleges ==
=== Autonomous/Degree Colleges affiliated to Berhampur University ===
- Govt. College, Phulbani
- S.B.R. Govt. Women’s College
- S. K. C. G. Autonomous College, Paralakhemundi
- Science College

=== Autonomous/Degree Colleges affiliated to Fakir Mohan University ===
- Bhadrak Autonomous College, Bhadrak
- Fakir Mohan Autonomous College, Balasore

=== Autonomous/Degree Colleges affiliated to Kalahandi University ===
- Khariar Autonomous College, Khariar, Nuapada

=== Autonomous/Degree Colleges affiliated to Maharaja Sriram Chandra Bhanja Deo University ===
- Karanjia College
- Maharaja Purna Chandra Autonomous College, Baripada

=== Autonomous/Degree Colleges affiliated to Rajendra Narayan University ===
- DAV College Titilagarh

=== Autonomous/Degree Colleges affiliated to Sambalpur University ===
- Government Autonomous College, Rourkela
- Ispat Autonomous College, Rourkela

=== Autonomous/Degree Colleges affiliated to Utkal University ===
- Baba Bhairabananda Mahavidyalaya
- Banki College
- BJB Autonomous College, Bhubaneswar
- Dhenkanal Autonomous College, Dhenkanal
- Government Autonomous College, Angul
- Kendrapara Autonomous College, Kendrapara
- N.C. Autonomous College, Jajpur
- Nayagarh college
- Nimapara College
- Prananath Autonomous College, Khordha
- Rajdhani College, Bhubaneswar
- S.V.M. College
- Salipur College
- Samanta Chandra Sekar College
- Talcher Autonomous College, Talcher, Angul
- Udayanath Autonomous College of Science and Technology, Cuttack
- Vyasanagar Autonomous College, Byasanagar, Jajpur

=== Autonomous/Degree Colleges affiliated to Vikram dev University ===
- Rayagada Autonomous College, Rayagada

== Think tanks / Research institutes ==
- Nabakrushna Choudhury Centre for Development Studies (NCDS), Bhubaneswar
- TQM World Institution of Quality Excellence (TQM-WIQE), Odisha
