= Krishna Mohan Pathi =

Orthopedic surgeon from Odisha, India

- Born: 6 September 1939 (age 86); Sukunda village, Ganjam district, Odisha, India
- Citizenship: India
- Education: MBBS, MS
- Alma mater: Srirama Chandra Bhanja Medical College and Hospital; Maharaja Krushna Chandra Gajapati Medical College and Hospital
- Occupation: Orthopedic surgeon
- Organization: Bharadwaj Gurukul Ashram
- Known for: Treating the poor patients for free of cost
- Awards: Padma Shri, 2021

Dr. Krishna Mohan Pathi (born 6 September 1939) is an Indian orthopedic surgeon from Odisha, India, who is known for his work in Odisha's tribal areas. He treats the poor for free of cost. He is the founder of Bharadwaj Gurukul Ashram, a charitable organization that helps the poor and needy with medical treatment for the last three decades, as of 2021. On January 26, 2021, the Government of India conferred him India's fourth-highest civilian award the Padma Shri.

He was born on September 6, 1939 (Krishna Janmashtami), in Sukunda village near Berhampur in Ganjam district of the Indian state of Odisha. He holds an MBBS from S.C.B. Medical College and Hospital. Later, he did his MS from England. As a Commonwealth Medical Fellow, he went to England in 1972 and worked at Radcliffe Infirmary, Oxford, Liverpool and Birmingham.

Later, Pathi returned to India and worked in Veer Surendra Sai Institute of Medical Sciences and Research (VIMSAR), Burla and Maharaja Krushna Chandra Gajapati Medical College and Hospital, Brahmapur. When he was retired, he returned to his home village and started serving the poor for free. For over 30 years, he has been conducting bone marrow tests of the underprivileged. He has established a charitable organization called Bharadwaj Gurukul Ashram.

== Recognition ==
- In 2021, he was awarded Padma Shri by the Government of India.
- He was featured in the Limca Book of Records in 1990 when he made a patient eat after 20 years. At that time he was a Professor and the Head of the Department of Orthopedic Surgery at MKCG Medical College and Hospital in 1988.

== See also ==
- List of Padma Shri award recipients (2020–2029)
