= Jayadev =

Jayadev, Jayadeva, Jaydev, Jaidev, or Jayadeb may refer to:

== Films ==
- Jaidev (film), 1998 Indian Kannada-language film directed by H. Vasu
- Jayadeb, a 1962 Indian Odia-language film by Byomkesh Tripathy about Jayadeva
- Jayadev (film), a 2017 Indian Telugu-language film by Jayanth C. Paranjee

== Places ==
- Jayadev (Odisha Vidhan Sabha constituency), in Khordha district, Odisha, India
- Jaydev Kenduli, a village in Birbhum district, West Bengal, India, one of the purported birthplaces of Jayadeva

== People ==
=== Jaidev ===
- Jaidev (1918–1987), Indian film music composer
- Jaidev Kapoor (1908–1994), Indian revolutionary
- Jaidev Kumar, Indian musician
- Jaidev Rai, governor of Brahmachal under the Twipra Kingdom of India

=== Jaideva ===
- Jayadeva (born c. 1170), an Indian Hindu (Vaishnava) poet in Sanskrit from medieval India, best known for the Gita Govinda
- Jaideva Singh (1893–1986), Indian musicologist

=== Jayadev ===
- Jayadev Misra, Indian-American computer scientist
- Jayadev Mohan, Indian actor and director
- Galla Jayadev, Indian politician and industrialist
- Raj Jayadev (born 1975), Indian-American community organiser and criminal justice advocate
- Sheila Jayadev, Australian executive producer on 2024 TV series Critical Incident

=== Jaydev ===
- Jaydev Shah, Indian cricketer
- Jaydev Unadkat, Indian cricketer

=== Fictional characters ===
- Jaidev or Jai (Sholay), a fictional character portrayed by Amitabh Bachchan in the classic 1975 Indian film Sholay
- Jaidev, a fictional horror character created by Indian writer Narayan Dharap

== See also ==
- Kavi Joydev, a 1941 Indian Bengali-language film about Jayadeva by Jiben Bose
- Sri Jayadev College of Pharmaceutical Sciences, Bhubaneswar, Khordha district, Odisha, India
- Sri Jayadeva Institute of Cardiovascular Sciences and Research, Karnataka, India
- Jayadevan's system, score recalculation method in cricket
- Jayadevan Chakkadath, Indian film sound recordist and designer
