= Pandit Raghunath Murmu Medical College and Hospital =

Indian medical college

- ପଣ୍ଡିତ ରଘୁନାଥ ମୁର୍ମୁ ଭେଷଜ ମହାବିଦ୍ୟାଳୟ ଓ ଚିକିତ୍ସାଳୟ, ବାରିପଦା
- Other names: PRM Medical College and Hospital
- Motto: Citius Altius Fortius
- Type: Medical College and Hospital
- Established: 2017; 9 years ago
- Affiliations: National Medical Commission
- Academic affiliations: Odisha University of Health Sciences
- Dean: Dr. Nirmal Chandra Mohapatra
- Undergraduates: 125 per year
- Location: Baripada, Odisha, 757107, India; 21.909827°N 86.789982°E
- Website: prmmch.nic.in

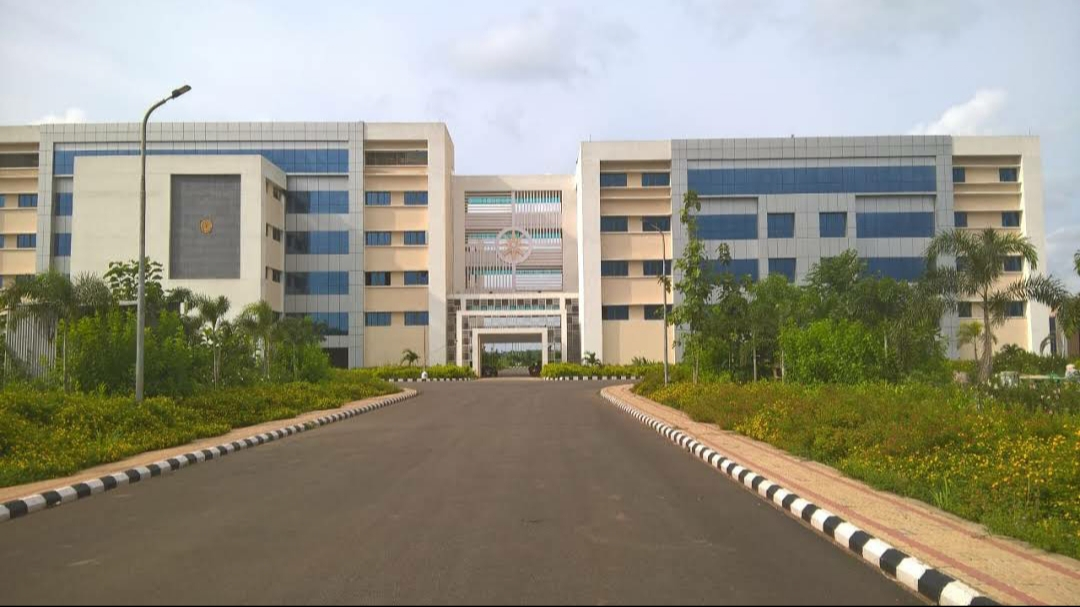
College Building

Pandit Raghunath Murmu Medical College (PRMMCH) is a tertiary government medical college located in Sankhabhanga, situated 9 km (5.6 mi) from the district headquarter of Mayurbhanj District, Baripada, Odisha and 4 km from the NH18. It is the fourth government medical college of Odisha, after SCB Medical College, MKCG Medical College and VIMSAR.

The college was inaugurated in 2017 by Odisha Chief Minister Naveen Patnaik. The college is administered by the Government Of Odisha under the supervision of Directorate of Medical Education and Training (DMET) and comprises all the clinical and paraclinical departments of the undergraduate curriculum. This college works alongside the District Headquarter Hospital, Baripada, which is located in the heart of Baripada. The hospital associated with the college is the largest hospital in the Mayurbhanj district.

== Administration ==
The Dean of the college is Dr. Nirmal Chandra Mohapatra, M.B.B.S., M.S. (Orthopedics).

The Vice Principal is Dr. Braja Kishore Das, Professor and Head of the Department of Forensic Medicine and Toxicology.

The Medical Superintendent of the associated teaching hospital is Dr. Ritanjali Behera, Ex-Professor and Head of the Department of Obstetrics and Gynaecology.

== History ==
The college was established in 2017 and functioned as a full-fledged hospital from the date of establishment. It is named after the Indian writer and linguist Pandit Raghunath Murmu, who is well known for his invention of the "Ol Chiki" script widely used in Santali Language.

== College infrastructure ==
The college is built on a 70 acre land and is associated with the DHH Hospital, which is located in the city 7 km away, along with a teaching hospital which is attached with the medical college campus. The patient outflow is high in the main hospital and moderate in the new teaching hospital. The teaching hospital has 650 beds. Construction of a new cancer hospital been completed and is yet to become functional. The college has separate undergraduate boys' and girls' hostels for MBBS students, an interns hostel for House Surgeons, and RDH for Residents. The new girls' hostel is inaugurated in 2024 which is functional from December 2024. The old girls' hostel has been allotted to the first year students as per current NMC guidelines. Each of the hostels has its own mess except the old girls' hostel (first year's hostel).

The Academic Building is the central hub of teaching, learning, and research within the institution. Strategically located at a distance of approximately two minutes' walk from the student hostels, it provides convenient access for undergraduate and postgraduate students, faculty members, researchers, and other academic staff. Its proximity to the residential area allows students to attend lectures, practical classes, library sessions, and academic discussions with ease, thereby promoting an efficient and student-friendly learning environment.

The building has been designed to support medical education by integrating teaching facilities, research infrastructure, and departmental offices under one roof. It houses modern classrooms, departmental laboratories, faculty offices, demonstration halls, and various academic support facilities required for competency-based medical education. The infrastructure is planned to facilitate both theoretical instruction and practical training while encouraging interdisciplinary collaboration among different medical specialties.

A significant feature of the Academic Building is the presence of the Multidisciplinary Research Unit (MRU). The MRU serves as a dedicated center for biomedical and clinical research, promoting high-quality scientific investigations across various medical disciplines. It provides advanced laboratory facilities, research equipment, and technical support for faculty members, postgraduate students, and undergraduate researchers. The unit encourages collaborative research projects, innovation, and evidence-based medical practices, thereby strengthening the institution's research output and contributing to advancements in healthcare.

The Academic Building also houses a well-maintained, fully air-conditioned Central Library that serves as an important academic resource for students and faculty. The library offers a calm and comfortable environment conducive to learning and self-study. It contains an extensive collection of medical textbooks, reference books, journals, dissertations, and other academic resources covering both basic and clinical sciences. In addition to its print collection, the library provides access to digital learning materials, electronic journals, and online databases, enabling users to stay updated with current medical knowledge and research developments.

Adjacent to the library is a dedicated Study Room exclusively for medical students. The study room offers a quiet and disciplined atmosphere where students can prepare for examinations, engage in group discussions, and pursue self-directed learning. Its extended accessibility allows students to utilize the facility beyond regular classroom hours, thereby fostering continuous academic engagement and independent learning.

The Academic Building accommodates several Pre-Clinical and Para-Clinical departments that play a fundamental role in the MBBS curriculum. These departments provide the scientific foundation essential for understanding human health, disease processes, diagnosis, prevention, and treatment.

The Department of Anatomy is responsible for teaching the gross anatomy, embryology, histology, neuroanatomy, and radiological anatomy of the human body. It provides students with a comprehensive understanding of human structure through cadaveric dissection, museum specimens, models, and microscopic studies.

The Department of Physiology focuses on the normal functioning of the human body. Through lectures, practical demonstrations, and laboratory exercises, students develop an understanding of various physiological systems and mechanisms that maintain homeostasis.

The Department of Biochemistry introduces students to the molecular and biochemical basis of life. The department teaches metabolism, enzymology, molecular biology, genetics, nutrition, and laboratory diagnostic techniques essential for understanding disease mechanisms.

The Department of Microbiology deals with the study of bacteria, viruses, fungi, parasites, and immunology. It equips students with knowledge regarding infectious diseases, laboratory diagnosis, antimicrobial therapy, and infection prevention practices.

The Department of Pathology provides comprehensive training in the mechanisms of disease. Students learn about cellular injury, inflammation, neoplasia, hematology, systemic pathology, and laboratory diagnostic methods through theoretical instruction and practical sessions.

The Department of Pharmacology focuses on the scientific study of drugs, including their mechanisms of action, therapeutic uses, adverse effects, and rational prescribing practices. The department emphasizes safe and evidence-based pharmacotherapy through practical exercises and clinical correlations.

The Department of Community Medicine is dedicated to preventive, promotive, and public health aspects of medicine. It trains students in epidemiology, biostatistics, national health programmes, environmental health, family medicine, and community-based healthcare through field visits and community outreach activities.

The Department of Forensic Medicine & Toxicology imparts knowledge related to medical jurisprudence, forensic pathology, toxicology, and ethical principles in medical practice. The department prepares students to understand the medico-legal responsibilities of healthcare professionals and their role within the justice system.

The campus is equipped with badminton courts, basketball court, cricket arena and football ground.

One of the most peaceful and cherished places on our college campus is the Ram Mandir situated adjacent to the college premises. It serves as a serene retreat where students, faculty members, and staff can spend a few quiet moments away from the demands of academic life. Amid busy schedules, examinations, clinical postings, and personal challenges, the temple provides a calm environment that helps restore mental peace and emotional balance.

The temple's tranquil surroundings, soothing atmosphere, and spiritual ambiance create an ideal space for reflection, meditation, and prayer. Many students visit the temple before examinations, practical assessments, or important events to seek blessings and confidence. Others simply spend a few minutes there to relax, clear their minds, or find comfort during stressful times. The gentle ringing of the temple bells and the peaceful environment contribute to a sense of positivity and inner calm.

Beyond its religious significance, the Ram Mandir promotes values such as discipline, compassion, humility, and respect, which are essential qualities for future healthcare professionals. It reminds students that alongside academic excellence, emotional resilience and ethical values are equally important in the journey of becoming responsible doctors.

The presence of the temple also strengthens the sense of community within the campus. During festivals and special occasions, students and staff gather to participate in prayers and celebrations, fostering unity, cultural appreciation, and mutual respect. These moments provide a welcome break from routine and help create lasting memories.

Overall, the Ram Mandir is much more than a place of worship. It is a symbol of peace, hope, and positivity within the college campus. Its presence enriches the educational environment by offering students a sanctuary where they can find solace, regain focus, and maintain a healthy balance between academic responsibilities and personal well-being.

== Extracurricular activities and cultural programmes ==
Student earn prizes in the intermedics every year. The college students have gracefully backed meritorious prizes in competitions organised by premier institutes ike AIIMS.

Other activities include Annual Function, Fresher's event and Annual Sports. The college also celebrates all the Indian festivals. Events include the Fusion-X, The Freshers Eve, Itermedics, Elixir, and various academic seminars. Various sports such as cricket, football, volleyball, tennis, and basketball are played daily. Various tournaments of different sports are also held. The college has a gym. Various societies and clubs exist for dance, art, music, writing, films, and so on.

These activities are coordinated by different societies such as;

1. Avinyam, The Cultural Society

2. Narrative Neurons, The Literary Society

3. Vrishank, The Academic Society

4. Natyakalika, The Dramatic Society

5. Flickerflames, The Cinematic Society

6. The DumbBells, The Gym Society

7. FrameZ, The AVS Society

8. Aakruti, The Fine Arts Society

9. Sanjeevani, The SSG Society

== Courses offered and admission ==
The college imparts the degree Bachelor of Medicine and Bachelor of Surgery (MBBS) under the Odisha University of Health Sciences from 2023 with an annual intake of 125. N.B. Until 2022, it was affiliated to North Orissa University, Baripada. N.B. Until 2018 its annual intake was 100 students per year.

Along with that, the college also offers allied medical sciences training to DMLT/DMRT students.

Admission to the undergraduate (MBBS) course is done on the basis of merit through the single window national level exam National Eligibility and Entrance Test(NEET). A 15% AIQ quota exists for all Indian students, with 85% of seats reserved for the state.
