= IIRS =

IIRS may refer to:

- Indian Institute of Remote Sensing, Dehradun
- International Institute of Rehabilitation Sciences and Research, Bhubaneswar
