= Odisha University of Health Sciences =

Public medical university in Odisha, India

- Motto: ସର୍ବେ ସନ୍ତୁ ନିରାମୟା
- Motto in English: Everyone live with peace and harmony
- Type: Public Medical University
- Established: 5 March 2023 (3 years ago)
- Academic affiliations: UGC; AIU
- Chancellor: Governor of Odisha
- Vice-Chancellor: Dr. Manash Ranjan Sahoo
- Location: Bhubaneshwar, Odisha, India; 20°15′22″N 85°49′55″E
- Campus: Sishu Bhawan Square, Bhubaneswar, Khordha, Odisha, 751009
- Website: www.ouhs.ac.in

Odisha University of Health Sciences (OUHS) is a public state medical university located in Bhubaneswar, Odisha, India, established in 2023 by an Odisha University of Health Sciences, Act 2021 of the Odisha Legislative Assembly.

== About ==
Odisha University of Health Sciences was established on 5 March 2023 to cater the much needed quality in medical education for the state of Odisha as an affiliating university ensuring affiliation, uniformity in various medical academic programmes, training and research in modern medicine, homeopathy, Ayurveda, Dental, Pharmacy, Nursing, Physiotherapy, Laboratory and Radiation Technology.

== History ==
Odisha was perhaps the only state in India where medical colleges were being governed by general universities with each affiliated with a separate university. A great disparity has been felt by coming years in areas of uniformity and a lack of nodal agency for the medical education and research in the state. So initially the state government had proposed a health university in the early 2000s, the by-laws and rules for the university were submitted to the government by an expert committee in 2005. After 16 years, the Assembly had given its nod to the Odisha University of Health Sciences Bill on 3 September 2021.

OUHS has started functioning from its temporary building at Sishu Bhawan Square, Bhubaneswar as per a notification issued by the Health and Family Welfare Department of Odisha on March 5, 2023 (Panchayati Raj and Lokaseva Divas). The new university will provide uniform and quality medical education in UG and PG courses of Allopathy, Homeopathy, Ayurveda, Nursing, Pharmacy, Physiotherapy, Laboratory technology and other allied medical science courses in the state.

For the permanent campus of university, a committee has been formed to suggest an alternative site of approx. 25 acres in the periphery of Bhubaneswar city.

In May 2023, Odisha State Cabinet chaired by CM Naveen Pattnaik approved ₹330.17 crore for the establishment of the university which will facilitate achieving excellence in the field of Medical and Allied Health Education and Research.

== Organisation and administration ==
=== Governance ===
The Governor of Odisha is the chancellor of the Odisha University of Health Sciences. This university became active with the appointment of Dr. Datteswar Hota (former dean and principal of SCB Medical College and Hospital) as the first vice-chancellor of OUHS on 5 March 2023. On first foundation day of the university Vice-chancellor brought all health, Ayush, medical, dental, nursing, para-medical and allied health sciences colleges of Odisha state have brought under Odisha University of Health Sciences jurisdiction.

=== Courses ===
Institution started to offer PhD courses in various departments from 2024 academic session.

=== Affiliations ===
The Odisha University of Health Science is an affiliating university and has jurisdiction over all the medical, nursing, and paramedical colleges of the entire state of Odisha, covering more than 200 medical and paramedical colleges.

=== Academic collaboration ===
In 2024 institution signed multiple number of MoUs agreements with various national and international bodies to bring comprehensive improvement in the field of medical education, research.

== Affiliated institutions ==
=== Allopathic medical colleges ===
==== Government ====
- Acharya Harihar Post Graduate Institute of Cancer, Cuttack
- Bhima Bhoi Medical College and Hospital, Balangir
- Fakir Mohan Medical College and Hospital, Balasore
- Government Medical College and Hospital, Sundargarh
- Saheed Rendo Majhi Medical College and Hospital, Bhawanipatna
- Government Medical College and Hospital, Phulbani
- Dharanidhar Medical College and Hospital, Kendujhar
- Maharaja Jajati Keshri Medical College and Hospital, Jajpur
- Maharaja Krushna Chandra Gajapati Medical College and Hospital, Berhampur
- Pabitra Mohan Pradhan Medical College and Hospital, Talcher
- Pandit Raghunath Murmu Medical College and Hospital, Baripada
- PGIMER and Capital Hospital, Bhubaneswar
- Saheed Laxman Nayak Medical College and Hospital, Koraput
- Saheed Rendo Majhi Medical College and Hospital, Bhawanipatna
- Shri Jagannath Medical College and Hospital, Puri
- Srirama Chandra Bhanja Medical College and Hospital, Cuttack

==== Private ====
- Hi-Tech Medical College & Hospital, Bhubaneswar
- Hi-Tech Medical College & Hospital, Rourkela
- Ispat Post Graduate Institute and Super Specialty Hospital

=== Ayurvedic colleges and hospitals ===
==== Government ====
- Gopabandhu Ayurveda Mahavidyalaya, Puri
- Govt. Ayurvedic College and Hospital, Balangir
- Kaviraj Ananta Tripathy Sharma Ayurvedic College & Hospital, Brahmapur

==== Private ====
- Indira Gandhi Memorial Ayurvedic College & Hospital, Bhubaneswar
- Mayurbhanj Ayurveda Mahavidyalaya, Baripada
- Sri Sri Nrusingha Nath Ayurved College & Research Institute, Paikmal

=== Homeopathic colleges and hospitals ===
==== Government ====
- Dr. Abhin Chandra Homoeopathic Medical College & Hospital, Bhubaneswar
- Biju Pattnaik Homoeopathic Medical College & Hospital, Brahmapur
- Odisha Medical College of Homoeopathy & Research, Sambalpur
- Utkalmani Homoeopathic Medical College & Hospital, Rourkela

==== Private ====
- Mayurbhanj Homeopathic Medical College & Hospital, Baripada
- Cuttack Homeopathic Medical College & Hospital, Cuttack

=== Dental colleges ===
==== Government ====
- S.C.B. Dental College and Hospital, Cuttack

==== Private ====
- Hi-Tech Dental College and Hospital, Bhubaneswar

=== Pharmacy colleges ===
==== Private ====
- College Of Pharmaceutical Sciences, Tamando, Bhubaneswar
- College Of Pharmaceutical Sciences, Mohuda, Brahmapur
- College Of Pharmaceutical Sciences, Baliguali, Puri
- Dadhichi College Of Pharmacy, Sundargram, Cuttack
- Gayatri College Of Pharmacy, Jamadarpali, Sambalpur
- Gayatri Institute Of Science And Technology
- Hitech College of Pharmacy
- Indira Gandhi Institute of Pharmaceutical Sciences, Bhubaneswar
- Institute of Health Sciences Bhubaneswar
- Institute Of Pharmacy And Technology, (SALIPUR,) Cuttack Odisha
- IPT is Accrediated By NAAC and B Pharm course Accrediated By NBA New delhi.
- IMT Pharmacy College, Puri
- Jeypore College Of Pharmacy
- Soum Jena College Of Pharmacy & Medical Science, Cuttack
- Kanak Manjari Institute of Pharmaceutical Sciences, Rourkela
- Roland Institute Of Pharmaceutical Sciences, Brahmapur, Odisha
- Royal College Of Pharmacy & Health Sciences
- Seemanta Institute Of Pharmaceutical Sciences
- Sri Jayadev College of Pharmaceutical Sciences, Bhubaneswar

=== Rehabilitative science ===
- Swami Vivekanand National Institute of Rehabilitation Training and Research, Olatpur
- International Institute of Rehabilitation Sciences and Research, Bhubaneswar

== See also ==
- Education in Odisha
- List of institutions of higher education in Odisha
