= Sanghamitra Pati =

Researcher

Dr.Sanghamitra Pati, a physician-scientist is currently the director of Public health at RMRC, Bhubaneswar the regional institution of the ICMR & the only institute in Odisha. She is an expert on multimorbidity research in public health settings, having been a lead in the first ever study of multimorbidity in India.

Besides multiple publications on the topic, she has promoted multimorbidity literacy aimed at capacity building of service providers at national and international events, either as a speaker or as a panellist. Her studies relate to the burden of multimorbidity in primary care, psychiatric multimorbidity, patient-physician perspectives on the burden of multimorbidity, mapping of multimorbidity in medical education, and interprofessional education related to multimorbidity.

She received the Odisha Bigyan Academy Samanta Chandra Shekhar Award in Life Sciences Category in 2018.

Pati completed both her MBBS & MD from MKCG Medical College and Hospital, Berhampur.
