= IACR =

IACR may refer to:

- International Association for Cryptologic Research
- Institute of Arable Crops Research
- Gandhi Institute of Advanced Computer & Research, a college in India
