= OUHS =

OUHS may refer to:

- Odisha University of Health Sciences, a public state medical university in Bhubaneswar, Odisha, India
- Osaka University of Health and Sport Sciences, a private university in Kumatori, Japan
