= ASBM (disambiguation) =

ASBM may refer to:

- Anti-ship ballistic missile
- ASBM University
- Arctic Satellite Broadband Mission
