= PGIMER and Capital Hospital, Bhubaneswar =

Indian Postgraduate Medical school

PGIMER and Capital Hospital
- Motto: May all be happy, may all be free from ailments
- Type: Public Medical school
- Established: 1954; 72 years ago
- Academic affiliations: Odisha University of Health Sciences; NMC
- Director: Dr. Sujata Misra
- Location: Bhubaneswar, Odisha, India; 20.26013°N 85.82279°E
- Campus: Urban
- Website: pgimerch.odisha.gov.in

PGIMER and Capital Hospital, or Post Graduate Institute of Medical Education and Research and Capital Hospital, is a postgraduate medical school cum tertiary referral government hospital. It is located in Bhubaneswar city of Odisha, India.

== About ==
Capital Hospital, a flagship hospital of Government of Odisha, started in 1954 with 60 beds, on 20 acres of land at the centre of Temple city Bhubaneswar.

It is the biggest peripheral hospital in the State. Around 10-12 lakhs of people of Bhubaneswar, along with adjacent districts like Khordha, Nayagarh, Puri & adjoining areas depend on it.

Understanding the demand for specialist doctors in the state, the Odisha government decided to establish a Post Graduate Institute on the premise of Capital hospital on 28 April 2021. This standalone Post Graduate Institute, without any undergraduate courses was named as Post Graduate Institute of Medical Education & Research and Capital Hospital (PGIMER and CH). Dr. Nibedita Pani joined as the Director of this institute on 2 June 2022.

From 2022-23 educational year, this institution has been granted to offer Post Graduate courses in 6 clinical departments by the NMC, which include General Medicine, General Surgery, Paediatrics, Respiratory Medicine, Orthopaedics, Obstetrics and Gynaecology.

== See also ==
- All India Institute of Medical Sciences, Bhubaneswar
- Atal Bihari Vajpayee Institute of Medical Sciences and Dr. RML Hospital, New Delhi
- Jawaharlal Institute of Postgraduate Medical Education and Research, Puducherry
- National Institute of Mental Health and Neurosciences, Bengaluru
- Postgraduate Institute of Medical Education and Research, Chandigarh
- Sanjay Gandhi Postgraduate Institute of Medical Sciences, Lucknow
