= Fakir Mohan Medical College and Hospital =

Medical college and hospital in Balasore, Odisha, India

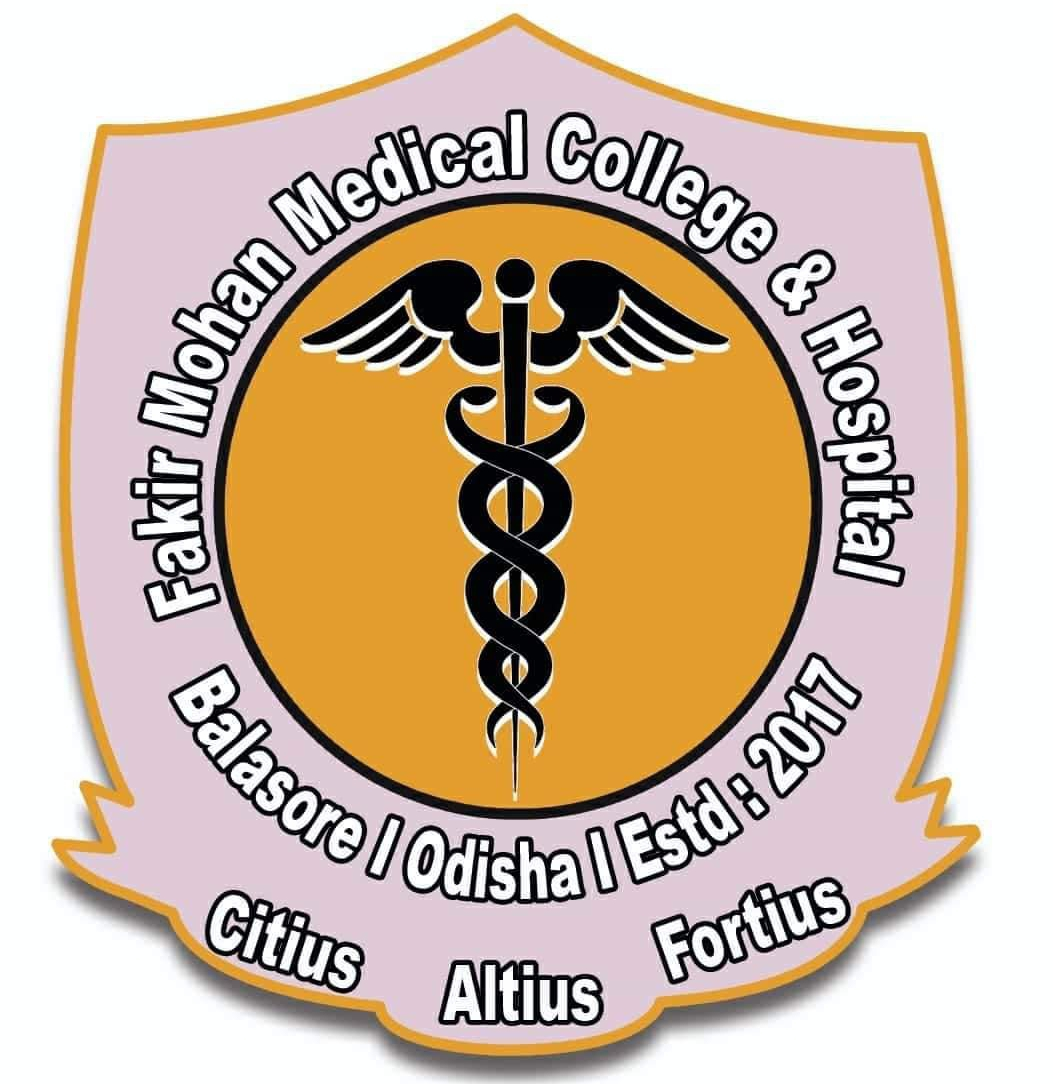
- Other names: FM Medical College and Hospital
- Motto: Citius Altius Fortius
- Type: Medical college and hospital
- Established: 2017; 9 years ago
- Affiliations: Odisha University of Health Sciences
- Principal: Dr. Jnanindra Nath Behera
- Undergraduates: 100 per year
- Location: Balasore, Odisha, India; 21.520895°N 86.885510°E
- Website: https://fmmch.odisha.gov.in

Fakir Mohan Medical College and Hospital, established in 2017, is a full-fledged tertiary government medical college and hospital. It is located at Balasore, Odisha. This college imparts the degree Bachelor of Medicine and Bachelor of Surgery (MBBS). The hospital associated with the college is one of the largest in Balasore district. The admission to the college is based on merit through NEET. Yearly undergraduate student intake is 100 from the year 2017. Former Union Minister Srikant Jena is widely credited to have got sanctioned grant for establishing this medical college by the UPA 2 government. It's the sixth government medical college of Odisha. FMMCH stands at second position after Srirama Chandra Bhanja Medical College and Hospital in Cuttack, in terms of patients' load and regarded as 2nd largest hospital and college in Odisha according to Government of Odisha (published on newspaper). It is one of the preferred medical colleges among the new medical colleges, due to its close proximity to the main town.

== Courses ==
Fakir Mohan Medical College, Odisha undertakes education and training of students in DM

== Affiliations ==
The college is affiliated with the Odisha University of Health Sciences and is recognized by the National Medical Commission.
