= Swami Vivekanand National Institute of Rehabilitation Training and Research =

Medical research institutes in India

- Type: Research, Autonomous Institution, Govt. of India
- Established: 1975
- Affiliations: Odisha University of Health Sciences
- Director: Dr. P. P. Mohanty
- Students: 930
- Undergraduates: 850
- Postgraduates: 80
- Location: Olatpur, Cuttack, Odisha, 754010, India
- Campus: Rural, Olatpur, 30 km from Cuttack.
- Website: svnirtar.nic.in

Swami Vivekanand National Institute of Rehabilitation Training and Research (SVNIRTAR) is an autonomous institute functioning under the Ministry of Social Justice and Empowerment of India. It is located in Olatpur, 30 km from Cuttack.

== History ==
The institute was conceived to provide manpower to the Artificial Limbs Manufacturing Corporation of India and was created in the name of Directorate of Artificial Limbs Fitting Center (DALFC) in March 1974 and started functioning at Safdarjung Hospital in New Delhi. When the institute was shifted to a rented place in Safdarjung Enclave, its name was changed to Central Institute of Prosthetic and Orthotic Training (CIPOT).

Following the offer of available land at Olatpur by former Odisha Chief Minister Nandini Satpathy during former Indian prime minister Indira Gandhi's visit to Odisha, Indira suggested Balu Sankaran, Professor Emeritus at St Stephen's Hospital and family surgeon to Indira Gandhi to study the feasibility of starting the Institute in Olatpur. The institute was shifted from New Delhi to Olatpur in November 1975 and started functioning from 3 December 1975 following the recommendations of Balu Sankaran. Subsequently, the institute's name was changed from CIPOT to the National Institute of Prosthetic and Orthotic Training (NIPOT) in 1976.

== Courses and services ==
The institute offers Diplomate of National Board (DNB) in Physical Medicine and Rehabilitation recognised by the NBEMS, Delhi. It also offers bachelor's degrees in physiotherapy (B.P.T.), Bachelor in Occupational therapy (B.O.T.) and bachelor's degree in Prosthetics and Orthotics (B.P.O.) of 4 1/2 years including a 6-month compulsory Internship as per rule of the university/ Rehabilitation Council of India in accredited hospitals, rehabilitation organizations in rural area/district rehabilitation centre, 2 - year master's degree in Occupational therapy (Neurology, Hand Therapy, Developmental Disabilities & Rehabilitation), Physiotherapy (Neurology, Pediatrics, Musculoskeletal Conditions & Rehabilitation), and Master in Prosthetics and Orthotics (MPO). It also conducts short orientation courses, Continuing Medical Education courses for rehabilitation professionals, awareness programmes for the functionaries of government and non-government persons with disabilities and their relatives.

== Rehabilitation services ==
Patients with locomotor/orthopedic, neurologic, or developmental disabilities due to ailments like poliomyelitis, cerebral palsy, congenital deformities, leprosy, burn contracture, paraplegia, hemiplegia, etc., and hearing and speech disabilities are treated, and rehabilitated. People with disabilities requiring artificial limbs and other rehabilitation aids and appliances are provided to prevent the impairment leading to disability and to make them near normal and to carry on their activities for daily living.

The rehabilitation is provided through the following infrastructure:

- 100 bedded hospital.
- Physical Medicine and Rehabilitation
- Prosthetic and Orthotic Department
- Physiotherapy Department
- Occupational therapy Department
- Two operation theatres for performing corrective and reconstructive surgery
- Microsurgery
- Assessment Clinic consisting of rehabilitation specialists and professionals to evaluate the patients
- Radiological and pathological investigation Units
- Cerebral Palsy Clinic
- Hand Clinic
- Speech Therapy
- Psychological counselling
- Vocational counselling, training and guidance
- Workshop for hand splints
- Hydrotherapy
- Modern and sophisticated rehabilitation equipment
- Rehabilitation park
- Early Intervention Clinic

== Prosthetics and orthotics ==
Prosthetics and orthotics science is now one of the world's fastest-growing areas of research and development.

Prosthetics is the study of prescribing, designing and fitting artificial replacements (may be any part of a normal human body) by biologically feasible materials, they may be internal (e.g., artificial body implants, internal knee joints used in the knee joint replacement surgery, etc.) or external (artificial limbs, aesthetic fingers, etc.). One who is an expert in this science is called a prosthetist and mainly deals with external replacements. A prosthetist deals with mainly amputees (unilateral, bilateral, trilateral, quadrilateral, etc.), or congenital malfunctioning of limbs or even replacing the missing limbs, etc.

Similarly, orthotics is the study of prescribing, designing and fitting supportive devices to any part of the human body with any neuromusculoskeletal disorders and one who is an expert in this science is called an orthotist. Sometimes splints are referred to as orthosis (the device); they are otherwise used for a short period. Some of the pathologies where orthotists play an important role are all types of paralysis patients (hemiplegics, paraplegics, etraplegivstrieics, quadriplegics, etc.), poliomyelitis, muscular dystrophy, CTEV, Cerebral Palsy, Burn injury, fractures (mainly fractures of cervical vertebrae), diabetic foot, leprosy, Perthe's disease, PID, LBP, vertebral deformities (scoliosis, kyphosis, lordosis, spondylolisthesis, etc.), phlagiocephalics, any LMN disorders, etc.

Apart from prosthesis and orthosis, a prosthetist and orthotist is the only licensed professional in India to prescribe mobility aids and appliances, i.e., crutch, wheelchair, walker, etc. Their workshops, one is called as the old laboratory which is near about 38 years old and meant for production and the latest is a new laboratory meant only for academics and research which is equipped with the latest pneumatic technology, with a workshop layout by Ottobock Healthcare, Germany.

The following aids and appliances are fabricated by the Department of Prosthetics and Orthotics:

- Endoskeletal prosthesis: endoskeletal below Knee and above-knee prosthesis with a soft cosmetic cover
- Immediate post-operative prosthesis (removable and re-adjustable systems)
- Plastic FO, AFO, KAFO
- Metallic AFO, KAFO and HKAFO
- Co-polymer polypropylene spinal braces
- Aluminum alloy spinal braces
- Wrist-driven, shoulder-driven hand and upper arm splints
- Fracture bracing

== Occupational therapy ==
Head of the Department: Dr. Anurupa Senapati (Assistant Professor, Occupational Therapy)

Occupational Therapy is being practiced in India for several decades. Occupational therapists provide services to individuals whose functional abilities are affected due to physical or mental illness, aging process, developmental problems and emotional problems. Occupational therapists use purposeful, goal-oriented activities to achieve their goals which are to help the individual to be functionally independent having satisfactory life.

The following services are available at the Department of Occupational Therapy:

- Evaluation and management of functional deficits
- General occupational therapy
- Developmental therapy
- Behavioral therapy
- Hand therapy
- ADL training
- Advice on barrier-free environment
- Sensory integration therapy
- Aquatic occupational therapy
- Small hand splints (temporary)
- Transfer training and mat activities

== Physiotherapy ==
Physiotherapy is the branch of modern treatment that deals with diseases and disorders by physical/natural means. It is not merely the application of physical modalities, but it includes evaluation, assessment, treatment planning and treatment application, re-assessment, modification of treatment programmes and advice to the client.

The Department of Physiotherapy caters services to both out and in patients. Patients are allotted to therapists who evaluate, assess and plan out the treatment and execute the therapy. Difficult and problematic cases are discussed in the departmental meetings and therapeutic measures appropriate for them are given. Suitable "Home exercise programmes" are advised to patients.

The following services are available at the Department of Physiotherapy.

- Electrotherapy – electrical stimulation, interferential therapy, TENS, TECAR Therapy, deep oscillation therapy
- Actinotherapy – ultraviolet, infrared radiation, laser etc.
- Heat therapy – paraffin wax bath, moist heat, ultrasound, short wave diathermy, microwave diathermy
- Exercise therapy
- Manual therapy including traction and soft tissue mobilization, manipulation
- Hydrotherapy units and cryotherapy
- Misc- CDG-Gait analyser, KIN KOM-Isokinetic unit, pulsed electromagnetic energy, biofeedback, virtual reality rehabilitation, balance rehab

The Units of the Physiotherapy Dept. follow:-

- Neurorehabilitation
- musculoskeletal-1
- musculoskeletal-2
- musculoskeletal-3
- paediatrics-1
- paediatrics-2
- stroke Rehabilitation unit

The Physiotherapy department has won many national as well as state-level awards for its service. Academics - course available - BPT (Bachelor of Physiotherapy, 4 years and 6 months Duration) MPT (Master of Physiotherapy, 2 years Duration)
