= Participatory defense =

Community organizing model

Participatory defense is a community organizing model that empowers individuals and communities to actively participate in the defense of their loved ones facing criminal charges. Developed in 2009 in the United States, this model seeks to transform the criminal justice system. Participatory defense enhances the influence of essential stakeholders—individuals accused of crimes, their relatives, and their communities—in efforts to reform the system. It enables these stakeholders to evolve from being mere recipients of services from attorneys and other experts to becoming proactive contributors who demand increased transparency, accountability, and equity from criminal justice systems.

According to Raj Jayadev, founder of the Participatory Defense Network and Silicon Valley De-bug, there are four main components to the Participatory Defense model, which include community organizing, storytelling, courtroom advocacy, and community healing. Participatory Defense aims to empower communities to take ownership of the criminal justice system, build relationships within the community, humanize defendants, provide emotional support, and achieve better outcomes for defendants and their families. Participatory Defense has successfully created a sense of justice and accountability within the community. Moreover, Participatory Defense challenges the traditional role of defense attorneys by engaging communities in the legal process and using personal narratives to humanize, shifting the narrative away from criminality and towards individual circumstances and needs.

== History ==
Participatory defense emerges in the early 2000s from social movements that underscored the need for community-driven approaches to criminal justice Police injustices, including racial profiling, excessive use of force, and wrongful convictions, are prevalent issues within the criminal justice system and disproportionately affect communities of color. Several articles have examined the harmful impact of police injustices on communities and individuals. These impacts prompted widespread advocacy efforts aimed at reforming the legal landscape, exploring alternative models, and addressing systemic inequities. Grassroots organizers and legal advocates began to prioritized community empowerment and engagement. The emergence of participatory defense in 2009 represented a significant milestone in this endeavor, as it provided a structured framework for communities to actively participate in the defense of their loved ones facing criminal charges. Drawing inspiration from community organizing principles and social justice movements, participatory defense sought to democratize the legal process by elevating the voices and experiences of those most affected by the criminal justice system.

== Impact ==
Participatory defense has had major success and community impact throughout the United States and can be seen in the experiences of the individuals and communities that have participated in it. Police injustices, including racial profiling, excessive use of force, and wrongful convictions, are prevalent issues within the criminal justice system and disproportionally affect communities of color. Several articles, have examined the harmful impact of police injustices on communities and individuals. These articles highlight the need for systemic change to address these issues and help provide insight into the ongoing challenges and complexities of the criminal justice system, as well as the potential for community-based initiatives to create meaningful change. Participatory Defense emerged to address these concerns.

Several scholars have written about and promote Participatory Defense as a promising approach to improve the quality of legal representation for low income and under resourced defendants. Participatory Defense can empower clients, shift the narrative away from criminality, and achieve better outcomes for defendants and their families. Several studies have shown evidence that Participatory Defense programs have a positive impact on clients' and families' sense of empowerment and agency within the criminal justice system, leading to reduced sentences and increased chances of acquittal.

== Case studies ==
Tyrone Brown was a Texas teenager sentenced to life in prison in 1990 for a crime he committed as a juvenile. His case garnered national attention due to concerns over the fairness of his trial and the severity of his sentence. Participatory defense organizers worked tirelessly to mobilize community support and advocate for Brown's release. They organized rallies, collected petitions, and engaged in media outreach to raise awareness about his case. Ultimately, their efforts paid off, and in 2010, Tyrone Brown was granted parole after serving 17 years in prison. His release was attributed in part to the overwhelming support generated by the participatory defense campaign.

In San Jose, California, participatory defense has become a cornerstone of community-driven efforts to reform the criminal justice system. Through partnerships with local organizations like Silicon Valley De-bug, participatory defense has empowered individuals and families to navigate the complexities of the legal system. By providing training, resources, and ongoing support, participatory defense organizers have helped countless defendants secure more favorable outcomes in their cases. These outcomes include reduced sentences, dismissals of charges, and greater accountability from law enforcement and legal authorities. Moreover, participatory defense has fostered a sense of collective agency and solidarity within communities, challenging the notion that justice is solely the purview of legal professionals. It has sparked conversations about systemic injustices and inspired broader efforts to reimagine public safety and community well-being.
