= Saheed Laxman Nayak Medical College and Hospital =

Indian government medical college and hospital in Koraput, Odisha

Saheed Laxman Nayak Medical College & Hospital
- Other names: SLN Medical College & Hospital
- Type: Public
- Established: September 4, 2017; 8 years ago
- Affiliations: Odisha University of Health Sciences
- Principal: Dr. Krushnachandra Biswal
- Students: 625
- Undergraduates: 125 per year
- Location: Koraput, Odisha, India; 18.807352°N 82.704050°E
- Campus: Urban
- Nickname: SLNMCH
- Website: www.slnmch.nic.in

SLN Medical College front

Saheed Laxman Nayak Medical College and Hospital, also popularly known as S.L.N. Medical College & Hospital, is a government medical college and hospital located in Koraput, Odisha, India. The hospital has its roots in a dispensary established in 1908. The college was inaugurated in 2017. It is the 4th government medical college opened in Odisha. It was inaugurated by the then CM Naveen Patnaik on 4 September 2017. It is the first medical college established in KBK Area.

== History ==
The hospital has its roots in a dispensary established in Koraput district in 1908. It was upgraded to a hospital in 1937 and moved to its present building in 2004. In 2007 it was renamed after freedom fighter Laxman Nayak and inaugurated as a medical college in 2017, the first such college to be inaugurated in Odisha since the MKCG Medical College and Hospital in 1962, and the fourth government run institute in the state. A fully functional gymnasium is there for gym freaks. For sports enthusiasts this is the only medical College which has an indoor badminton court.

== Affiliations ==
The college is affiliated with the Odisha University of Health Sciences and is recognized by the National Medical Commission.
