= Gandhi Institute for Technology =

Gandhi Institute For Technology (GIFT) Bhubaneswar
- ଗାନ୍ଧୀ ବୈଷୟିକ ଯାନ୍ତ୍ରିକ ମହାବିଦ୍ୟାଳୟ, ଭୁବନେଶ୍ବର, ଓଡିଶା
- Other names: GIFT, GIFT Bhubaneswar
- Motto: Education in Odisha
- Type: Private, Education, Research, Engineering, Institution
- Established: 2007
- Founder: Balaram Panda Trust
- Affiliations: Biju Patnaik University of Technology (BPUT); All India Council for Technical Education (AICTE); National Assessment and Accreditation Council (NAAC); National Board of Accreditation (NBA); International Accreditation Organization (IAO)
- Endowment: Private
- Chairman: Dr. Satya Prakash Panda
- Principal: Dr. S.K. Maharana
- Vice Chairman: Dr. Patitapaban Panda
- Academic staff: 250
- Undergraduates: 3,200
- Postgraduates: 250
- Location: Bhubaneswar, Khordha, Odisha, India; 20.22230°N 85.67292°E
- Campus: Urban, spread over 48 acres (0.2 km^{2}) in Bhubaneswar
- Colours: Green and White
- Website: www.gift.edu.in

Gandhi Institute For Technology (GIFT), Autonomous College, Bhubaneswar, is an engineering institution in Odisha, India. Established in 2007 by the Balaram Panda Trust.

== Admissions ==
Qualified candidates can apply for admission in any of the four-year B.Tech. (Bachelor of Technology) degree programs. Admissions the undergraduate programs are made through Odisha Joint Entrance Examination (OJEE), JEE MAIN and All India Engineering Entrance Examination (AIEEE) and admission into the postgraduate programs (M.Tech.) are made primarily through the Graduate Aptitude Test in Engineering (GATE) and O-JEE testing. any online application is ready to our collage in.

== Departments ==
Sr.No	B.Tech	MBA	MCA	M.Tech	MSC	Diploma	PHD
1	Agriculture	Aviation and Airport	-	CTM	Physics	Civil	
2	Civil	Health care and Hospital		ENV	Chemistry	CSE	
3	CSE	Logistic and Supply		ISE	Mathematics	Electrical	
4	CE			CCE		EEE	
5	EEE			CSE(AIML)		Mechanical	
6	ECE						
7	Mechanical						

== Research and development ==
A chapter of Rotaract Club was opened at GIFT college.

GIFT Engineering college is designated as a 'Scientific & Industrial Research Organization (SIRO)' by Ministry of Science & Technology, Govt. of India.

The Research and Development wing of GIFT holds regular conferences and workshops. They also conduct research in software development and robotics. It is an Oracle training center and offers training in DB2, RAD, SAP, web development and Android development.

GIFT is a collaborative R&D Project center of NALCO for Research Project on Nano Fluid.

GIFTIANS have developed two android apps "Gift Notice" and "Faculty CL", to facilitate communication between the administration and the students.

== Awards and ranking ==
- Gandhi Institute For Technology (GIFT), Bhubaneswar ranked 29th in all India level and awarded as 'Band Excellent' institution in ATAL Ranking of Institutions on Innovation Achievements (ARIIA) for the academic year 2021-22 by the Ministry of Education, Govt. of India declared on 29 December 2021.
- GIFT College Bhubaneswar has been classified as a "Band-B" institution (Rank between 26 and 50) in category of Private or Self-Financed College/ Institutes by AICTE, New Delhi, the apex body for technical education in India in association with MHRD, Govt. of India in the recently announced ATAL Ranking of Institutions on Innovation Achievement (ARIIA) 2020.
- GIFT is ranked 21st among 'TOP ENGINEERING COLLEGES OF EXCELLENCE' by CSR-GHRDC Engineering college survey 2018.
- GIFT is awarded as 'The Institute with Best Technology Utilization in Higher Education' in Eduquest-2018 organized by 'ETV Network'.
- GIFT is awarded as the 'Most Promising Engineering College' of Odisha in 2011 by the governor of Odisha.
- GIFT is ranked 3rd as top engineering college under BPUT and ranked 5th among best engineering colleges in odisha by Odisha Students.
- Team 'Bit Coders' of GIFT won 1st prize in Grand Finale of Smart India Hackathon - 2017.
- GIFT won 2nd and 3rd prizes in "National Robotics Championship by RoboFeast-2017, Cognizance IIT Roorkee" held at IIT Roorkee.
- GIFT organized a 'Summer School On Data Science using R Studio (SCDSR-2018)' from 29 May to 10 June 2018.

== Events & Conferences ==
AICTE-ISTE sponsored Induction cum Refresher Programme "Pedagogy Workshop on Innovative Teaching and Learning" has been conducted by the Department of Mechanical Engineering at Gandhi Institute For Technology from 04-01-2022 to 10-01-2022.

Department of Electronics and Communication Engineering of Gandhi Institute For Technology (GIFT), Bhubaneswar has organized TEQIP-III BPUT, Odisha Sponsored Two-day National Seminar on Next Generation Fibers(SNGF-2020)from February 27–28, 2020.

GIFT College has organized the student exchange program as a part of "Ek Bharat Shreshtha Bharat" an initiative by the Government of India. As per this unique idea of sustained and structured cultural connect, GIFT has been mapped with St. Vincent Pallotti College of Engineering and Technology, Nagpur by AICTE, New Delhi. As a part of this program 29 students along with two teachers paid a visit to the institution. The Ek Bharat Shreshtha Bharat is a great initiative of understanding the culture of different state in a fun and interactive manner. Through close cross-cultural interactions we were able to induce a sense of responsibility & ownership for the nation as a whole.

A two-day National Conference on "Restructuring Policy, Prospects and Challenges" was held at GIFT in association with AIIMS Bhubaneswar ".

A two-day Faculty Development Programme on "Teaching Methodology" was organised by Department of Basic Sciences & Humanities, Gandhi Institute For Technology (GIFT) in association with British Council, Kolkata on 17& 18 June 2019.

Department of ECE of Gandhi Institute For Technology (GIFT) in association with Institution of Electronics and Telecommunication Engineers (IETE) organised an intra-department poster presentation competition and seminar on 'Recent Trends in Telecommunication' on 26-03-2019.

Workshop 'Examination Reforms' by AICTE - The All India Council for Technical Education (AICTE), Eastern Region in association with the Gandhi Institute For Technology (GIFT), Bhubaneswar organised a workshop on ‘Examination Reforms’ at GIFT on 21-01-2019. Er. Patitapaban Panda, Vice Chairman of GIFT stressed the need of reforms in the examination systems as higher education is driving profound changes in the technical education system in the wake of the globalisation of the world economy.

ICCIDA-2018 - A two-day international conference on computational intelligence and data analytics (ICCIDA)-2018 was organised by Department of Computer Science & Engineering of Gandhi Institute for Technology (GIFT), Bhubaneswar on 26 and 27 October. Chief guest Prof Sheng Lung Peng from National Dong (HWA) University, Taiwan addressed the gathering.

ICCI-SEM-2017 - International Conference on Contemporary issues in Science, Engineering & Management held at GIFT in 18 and 19 February 2017.

== Sports ==
Sundargarh's International Junior Hockey defender Neelam Sanjeeb Xess graced the 12th Annual Athelatic Meet (OCTATHLON) held on 24 and 25 January.

== College Festivals and Hobby Clubs ==
On 29 January, MBA students organized their annual fest Bizzfestrix-2019 in which students from various B-Schools participated in several business games like Corporate Roadies, Business Quiz, Geet e Ghazal, TikTok challenges etc.

Festronix 2K19was organised on 19 and 20 February 2019 at the Gandhi Institute for Technology (GIFT) in Bhubaneswar, in which nearly 2000 students from different institutes across the state actively participated with great zeal and zest. This year's theme of Festronix 2K19 was ‘Startup Odisha’.
