= Indus College of Engineering =

Engineering college

- College logo
- Type: Private institution
- Established: 2007
- Affiliations: BPUT AICTE
- Endowment: Private
- Director: Ravi P. Reddy
- Academic staff: 150
- Administrative staff: 60
- Undergraduates: 2000
- Postgraduates: 400
- Location: Bhubaneswar, Odisha, India; 20.163348°N 85.785565°E
- Campus: 15 acres (0.1 km^{2})
- Website: www.indus.ac.in

Indus College of Engineering is an engineering college in Odisha. It was established in 2007.

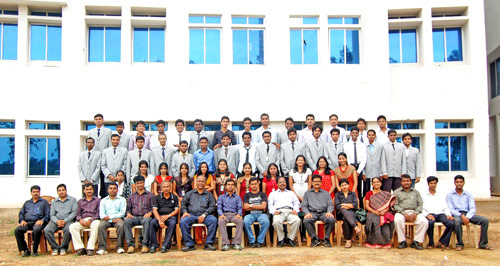
