= National Institute of Health Research, Bhubaneswar =

Indian research institute

- Nickname: NIHR, Bhubaneswar
- Established: 29 March 1981 (45 years ago)
- Field of research: Medical research
- Director: Sanghamitra Pati
- Location: Bhubaneswar, Odisha, India; 20.3166°N 85.8195°E
- Campus: NALCO Nagar, Chandrasekharpur
- Affiliations: Academy of Scientific and Innovative Research
- Operating agency: Indian Council of Medical Research
- Website: www.rmrcbbsr.gov.in

National Institute of Health Research, Bhubaneswar Or NIHR, Bhubaneswar (also known as ICMR-NIHR, Bhubaneswar) is an organization in the field of medical research, established in Bhubaneswar, Odisha, India. It was established in 1981 by the Indian Council of Medical Research (ICMR), New Delhi. The main focus area of research of the institute is on locally prevailing communicable and non-communicable diseases, tribal health and malnutrition in Odisha and adjoining states. It has Sanhamitra Pati as Director.

In January 2023, Mansukh Mandaviya, Union Minister for Health and Family Welfare, inaugurated the annex building of the institute also laid the foundation stone for the School of Public Health and a Biosafety Level 3 (BSL-3) Laboratory at the same facility.
