= Maharaja Jajati Keshri Medical College and Hospital, Jajpur =

Government medical college and hospital in Jajpur, established in 2024

Maharaja Jajati Keshri Medical College and Hospital
- Other name: Jajpur Medical College
- Type: Medical College and Hospital
- Established: 2024; 2 years ago
- Academic affiliations: OUHS; NMC
- Principal: Dr. Jami Sagar Prusti (acting)
- Location: Jajpur, Odisha, India
- Campus: Urban
- Website: jkmchjajpur.odisha.gov.in

Maharaja Jajati Keshri Medical College and Hospital, Jajpur (also known as Jajpur Medical College), is a Government medical college and hospital. Located at Jajpur in Jajpur district, Odisha, the college offers the degree Bachelor of Medicine and Surgery (MBBS) and associated degrees.

== Affiliates ==
The college is affiliated with Odisha University of Health Sciences and is recognized by the National Medical Commission.
