= Raj Jayadev =

American community organizer (born 1975)

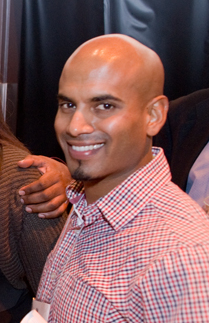
- Jayadev at Pacific News Service 40th anniversary celebration in 2010
- Born: 1975 (age 50–51)
- Education: University of California, Los Angeles
- Awards: MacArthur Fellow (2018)

Raj Jayadev (born 1975) is an American community organizer and criminal justice advocate. He is the founder of the Silicon Valley De-bug, a grassroots organization that supports people who have been impacted by the criminal justice system and their loved ones, advocating for criminal justice reform, economic justice, housing and immigrant rights. De-bug is a multi-media platform that centers the stories of marginalized communities in California. In 2018, Jayadev received a MacArthur Fellow Award for his work with the organization.

== Early life and education ==
Jayadev is from San Jose, California. Jayadev earned his undergraduate degree in political science at the University of California, Los Angeles. Throughout his studies Jayadev studied social movements, and, after graduating, spent a year working in India. When he returned to the United States he worked on the assembly line of aa Hewlett-Packard factory in San Jose, where he interacted with low-income workers who were building components for the tech industry. Jayadev learned that these workers were unsure of their own basic rights, and cynical as to whether they would be able affect any change. He began to collect and document their stories in a journal.

== Career ==
In 2001 Jayadev founded Silicon Valley De-bug, a local newspaper and multi-media platform that tells the stories of less visible communities in California. The platform was originally sponsored by the Pacific News Service, with the aim to ‘inspire a rage to take action,’. A collection of the stories were published in 2016 in the award-winning book De-Bug: Voices from the Underside of Silicon Valley. When Colin Kaepernick made his million dollar pledge in 2017, he donated $25,000 to Silicon Valley De-bug. Jayadev spent 2017 as Stanford University SEERS Fellow, where he investigated the structure of courts and examined the right to counsel.

De-bug established the Albert Cobarrubias Justice Project (ACJP), which has worked to change local court systems to give a voice to people facing charges, as well as training and supporting their families. De-bug and the ACJP bring community organising to courts, as part of a programme known as participatory defense. In participatory defense, ordinary citizens become change agents, helping to progress case outcomes and even transform the legal institutions themselves. The change agents search through police reports to create mitigation materials, and form an extension of the legal defense teams. In 2018 he delivered a TED talk on how communities can transform the courts. In the aftermath of the murder of George Floyd, Jayadev argued that racial justice could only truly begin when the police force reflected the communities they served.

== Awards and honors ==
- 2002 Utne Reader 30 Under 30
- 2014 Ashoka Fellow
- 2016 Silver Medal Foreword INDIES Book Awards
- 2017 San Francisco Chronicle Visionary of the Year nominee
- 2017 SEERS Fellows
- 2018 Selected as a MacArthur Fellow
- 2018 Defender Association of Philadelphia Stoneleigh Fellow

== Personal life ==
Jayadev is married with a son.
