= Bhima Bhoi Medical College and Hospital =

Medical College in Odisha, India

Bhima Bhoi Medical College and Hospital, Balangir
- Motto: सर्वे सन्तु निरामयाः
- Type: Medical college and hospital
- Established: 2018; 8 years ago
- Affiliations: Odisha University of Health Sciences, NMC
- Principal: Dr. Swayamprava Pradhan
- Location: Balangir, Odisha, Balangir 767002, India; 20.7047°N 83.4525°E
- Website: bbmchbalangir.odisha.gov.in

Bhima Bhoi Medical College and Hospital, Balangir is a full-fledged tertiary Government medical college and hospital. It is located at Balangir district, Odisha. The college imparts the degree Bachelor of Medicine and Bachelor of Surgery (MBBS) as well as specialized degrees. The hospital associated with the college is one of the largest in the Balangir district. Selection to the college is done on the basis of merit through the National Eligibility and Entrance Test. Yearly undergraduate student intake is 100.

== Courses ==
Bhima Bhoi Medical College undertakes education and training of students in

MBBS, MS (General Surgery), MS( Orthopedic), MD ( Paediatric)courses.

Apart from this, DMLT, DMRT, COTT and PG diploma courses are also offered.

== Affiliations ==
The college is affiliated with the Odisha University of Health Sciences and recognized by the National Medical Commission.
