= Saheed Rendo Majhi Medical College and Hospital =

Medical College in Odisha, India

- Other names: Government Medical College, Bhawanipatna; Kalahandi Medical College
- Type: Medical College and Hospital
- Established: 1 November 2023; 2 years ago
- Academic affiliations: Odisha University of Health Sciences, NMC
- Principal: Dr. Krishna Kar
- Location: Bhawanipatna, Odisha, India; 19.92960°N 83.14821°E
- Campus: Urban
- Website: Website

Government Medical College and Hospital, Bhawanipatna (also known as Kalahandi Medical College), now renamed as Saheed Rendo Majhi Medical College and Hospital is a government medical college and hospital Bhawanipatna in Kalahandi district, Odisha. The college offers Bachelor of Medicine and Surgery (MBBS) and associated degrees.

== Courses ==
SRMMCH, Bhawanipatna undertakes education and training of 100 students MBBS courses.

== Affiliated ==
The college is affiliated with Odisha University of Health Sciences and is recognized by the National Medical Commission.
