= Acharya Harihar Post Graduate Institute of Cancer =

Cancer care hospital and research institute in Cuttack, Odisha, India

- Other names: Acharya Harihar Regional Cancer Centre, Cuttack
- Type: Public Cancer Research Medical school
- Established: 2 February 1981; 45 years ago
- Academic affiliations: Odisha University of Health Sciences; NMC
- Dean: Dr. Rekha Das
- Director: Dr. Deepak Rautray
- Location: Cuttack, Odisha, India; 20.465700°N 85.900190°E
- Campus: Urban
- Website: www.ahpgic.in

Acharya Harihar Post Graduate Institute of Cancer, Cuttack, also known as Acharya Harihar Regional Cancer Centre, Cuttack, is a cancer care hospital and research institute. It is located in Cuttack, Odisha, India. It is named after social worker Acharya Harihara, a disciple of Acharya Vinoba Bhabe, founder of the Bhudan movement.

== History ==
Acharya Harihar Post Graduate Institute of Cancer is one of the 25 recognized Regional Cancer Centres in India. Founded on 2 February 1981 as the Radiotherapy Department of the SCB Medical College in Cuttack with 100 beds, it was converted into an autonomous body on 24 April 1984.

== Courses ==
Postgraduate degree courses in Anaesthesiology, Gynaecological Oncology, Surgical oncology and Pathology are offered.
