= Dharanidhar Medical College and Hospital =

Hospital in Odisha, India

- Other name: Kendujhar Medical College
- Motto: Citius Altius Fortius
- Type: Medical college and hospital
- Established: 2022; 4 years ago
- Affiliations: Odisha University of Health Sciences
- Principal: Dr. Chinmayi Mohapatra
- Location: Kendujhar, Odisha, India
- Website: https://gmchkeonjhar.odisha.gov.in/

Dharanidhar Medical College and Hospital (DMCH), Kendujhar, formerly known as Government Medical College and Hospital, Kendujhar, is a tertiary government medical college and hospital. It is located at Kendujhar district, Odisha. The college imparts the degree Bachelor of Medicine and Bachelor of Surgery (MBBS) as well as specialized degrees. The hospital associated with the college is one of the largest in the Kendujhar district. Selection to the college is based on merit through the National Eligibility and Entrance Test. The yearly undergraduate student intake is 100.

== Courses ==
Dharanidhar Medical College and Hospital undertakes education and training of students in MBBS courses.

== Affiliations ==
The college is affiliated with the Odisha University of Health Sciences and recognized by the National Medical Commission.
