= Institute of Health Sciences Bhubaneswar =

- ଇନଷ୍ଟିଚ୍ୟୁଟ୍ ଅଫ୍ ହେଲ୍ଥ ସାଇନ୍ସେସ
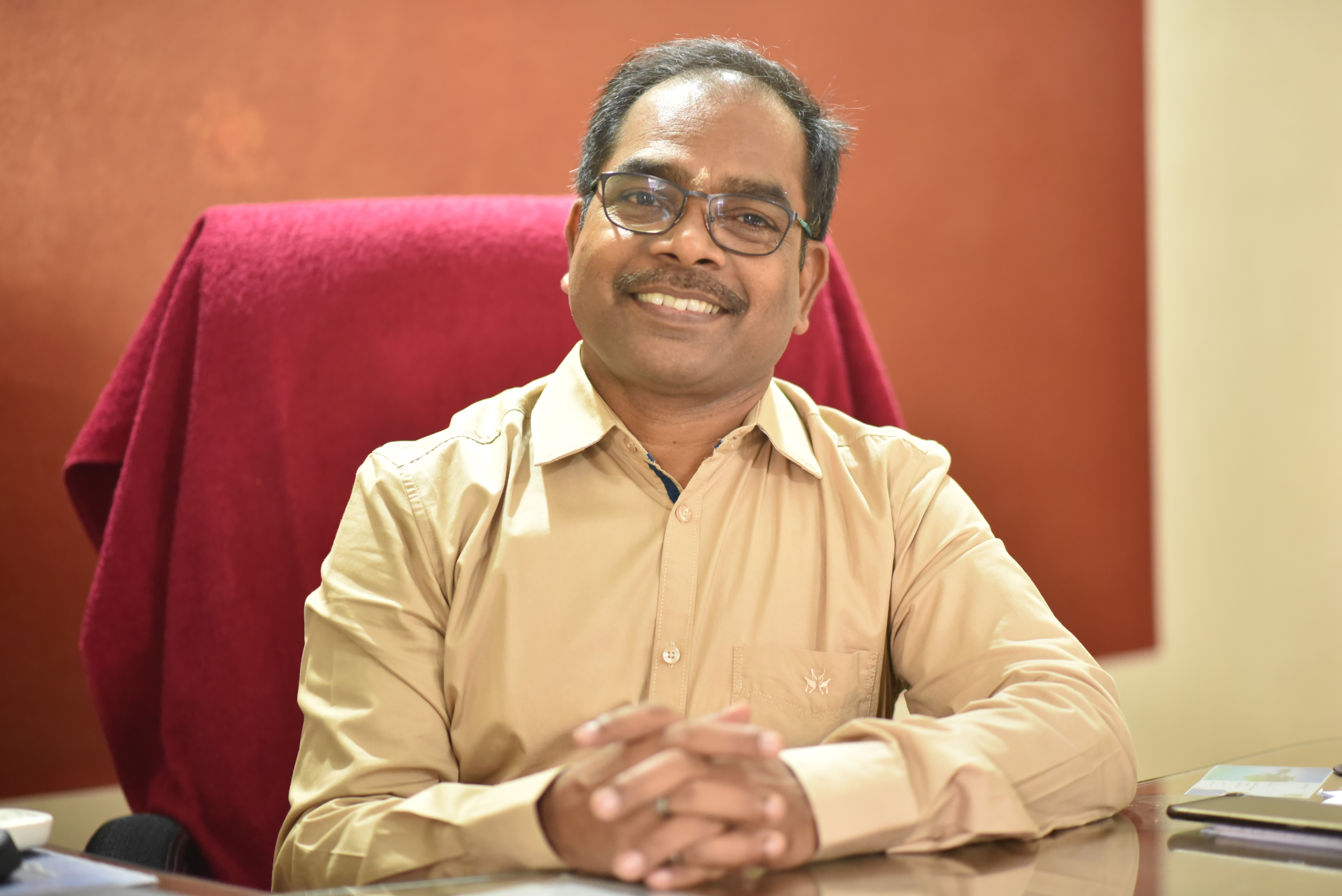
- Prof. Satya Mahapatra, founder of I.H.S. Bhubaneswar

Location
- Chandaka, Village, Bhubaneswar, Odisha 754005, India; South Asia; Chandaka, Odisha; India; 20.3574°N 85.7663°E

Information
- Other name: I.H.S. Bhubaneswar
- Established: 1999

The Institute of Health Sciences, Bhubaneswar, commonly known as I.H.S. Bhubaneswar, is a medical graduate college in Odisha. Founded in 1999, it offers medical degree courses in rehabilitation sciences, namely "Bachelor in Physiotherapy" (BPT), "Bachelor in Audiology & Speech Language Pathology" (BASLP), and, "Master in Audiology & Speech Language Pathology" (MASLP). The courses are recognized by the Government of Odisha, affiliated with Utkal University & approved by the RCI, New Delhi.

I.H.S. is a Recognized Training Center of Health & Family Welfare Department, Govt. of Odisha for Medical officers & Para-Medical Personnel. It is an associate of OpEPA in their Integrated Education for the Disabled (IED) program. I.H.S. has impaneled itself as a referral hospital for various organizations.

Furthermore, The Institute of Health Sciences is the recognized State Nodal Center of National Trust named Margdarsi, the statutory body set up by Govt of India to deal with Cognitive Impairment and Multiple Disabilities. The regional center of the Institute of Health Sciences at Bhubaneswar, Sambalpur, Anugul, Rourkela, at Odisha has been dedicated to the care of suffering humanity as well as to Assessment of hearing acuity, diagnosis of hearing disorders, auditory rehabilitation, dispensing of suitable hearing aids, and customization of the ear mold. Institute of health sciences is also known for the Model Center for Children with Special Needs which deals with Multimodal therapy for Autism Spectrum Disorders and other N euro-Developmental Disorders that cause a delay in the development of speech and language.
