= Pabitra Mohan Pradhan Medical College and Hospital =

Government medical college in Odisha

- Other names: Mahanadi Institute of Medical Science & Research
- Type: Medical college and hospital
- Established: 2021; 5 years ago
- Affiliations: Odisha University of Health Sciences, NMC
- Dean: Dr. Kirtirekha Mohapatra
- Location: Talcher, Odisha India; 20.936°N 85.173°E

Pabitra Mohan Pradhan Medical College and Hospital previously Mahanadi Institute of Medical Science and Research is a tertiary Government medical college in Talcher, Odisha, East India, and is accredited by the National Medical Commission. The college awards the degree Bachelor of Medicine and Bachelor of Surgery (MBBS). The college was established by Coal India limited.

== History ==
Mahanadi Coalfields Limited (MCL), the public sector undertaking and subsidiary of Coal India Limited reiterated its commitment to set up a medical college and hospital in the state, and signed a MoU with National Building Corporation of India (NBCC) for medical college. On 2022 Government of Odisha agrees to run the Medical college, while MCL will provide funds for operation.

== Courses offered ==
The college offers the degree Bachelor of Medicine and Bachelor of Surgery (MBBS). Selection to the college is done on the basis of merit through the National Eligibility and Entrance Test. Yearly undergraduate student intake is 100 and the college has 500 beds.
