= Ispat Post Graduate Institute and Super Specialty Hospital =

Coordinates: 22.264358°N 84.865160°E

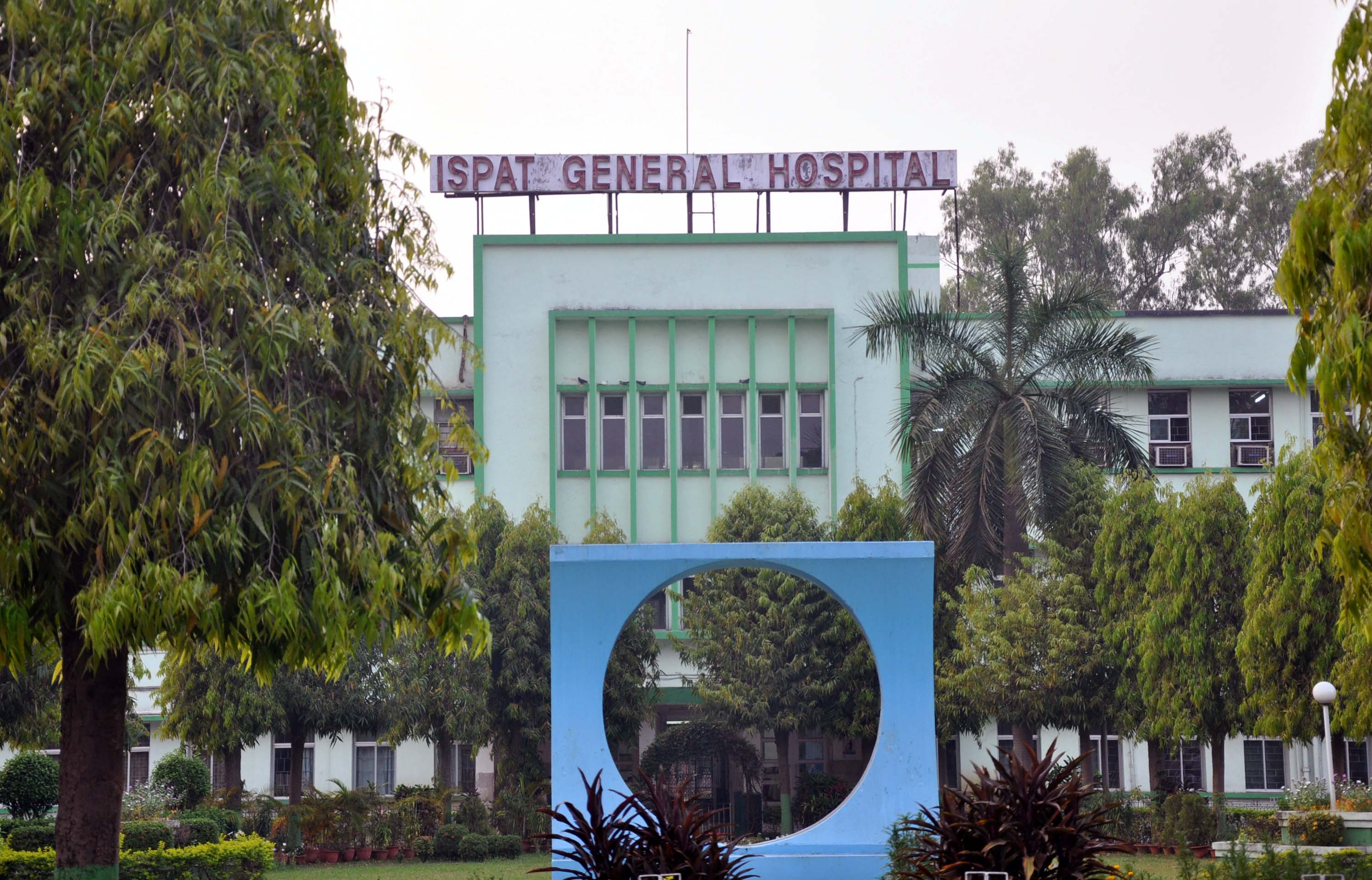

Geography
- Location: Sector 19, Rourkela, Odisha, India

Organisation
- Care system: Semi Government
- Type: General
- Affiliated university: Odisha University of Health Sciences

Services
- Beds: 300

History
- Founded: 21 March 2021

Ispat Post Graduate Institute and Super Specialty Hospital (IPGI&SSH) is a medical college and multi-specialty hospital located in sector 19 of the city of Rourkela in Odisha, India. It is associated with the Rourkela Steel Plant (RSP).

== History ==
Ispat General Hospital under RSP, SAIL, has a legacy of six decades. With a capacity of 600 beds, it was established in 1959 to provide quality medical & health services to RSP's employees, their families, the supporting population and the residents of neighboring areas in Odisha and adjoining states.
