= Veer Surendra Sai Institute of Medical Sciences and Research =

Public medical college and hospital in Sambalpur, Odisha, India

- ବୀର ସୁରେନ୍ଦ୍ର ସାଏ ଆୟୁର୍ବିଜ୍ଞାନ ଓ ଗବେଷଣା ପ୍ରତିଷ୍ଠାନ
- Crest of VIMSAR
- Former names: Government Medical College, Sambalpur; VSS Medical College
- Motto in English: To serve others always with a kind heart
- Type: Public
- Established: 1959; 67 years ago
- Affiliations: Odisha University of Health Sciences
- Dean: Dr. Pradeep Kumar Mohanty
- Director: Dr. Lal Mohan Nayak
- Location: Burla, Sambalpur, Odisha, India; 21.5°N 83.87°E
- Website: www.vimsar.ac.in

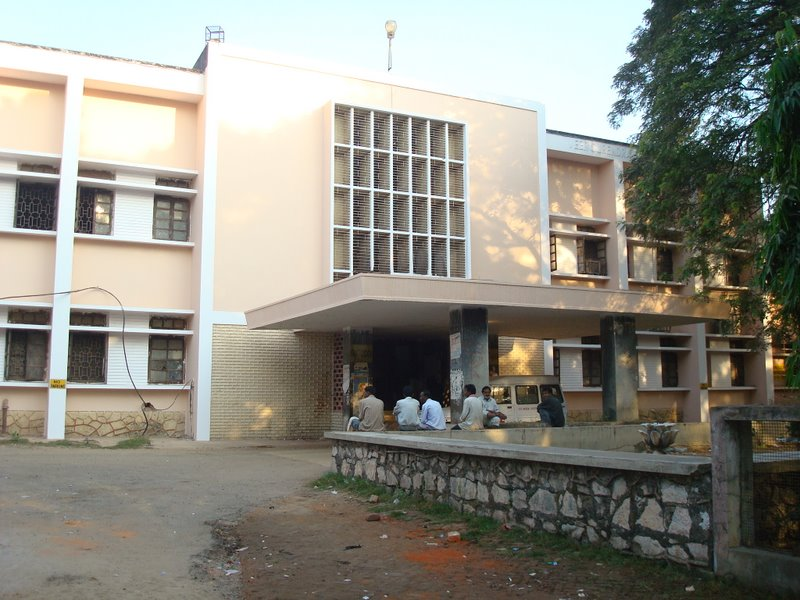
main entrance to Hospital block

Veer Surendra Sai Institute of Medical Sciences and Research (VIMSAR) is a public medical college and hospital located in Burla, Sambalpur district, Odisha, India. Established in 1959, it provides medical education at the undergraduate and postgraduate levels and serves as a tertiary-care referral hospital for western Odisha and adjoining areas of Chhattisgarh and Jharkhand.

== Location ==
The campus is situated in Burla, in the Sambalpur district of Odisha, about 330 kilometres northwest of the state capital, Bhubaneswar.

== History ==
In 1958, to address healthcare needs in western Odisha, the then Chief Minister of Odisha, Harekrushna Mahatab, decided to establish a medical college at Burla—the second in the state. The Burla Medical College (BMC) came into existence in July 1959, with 41 male and 9 female students selected from SCB Medical College in Cuttack forming its first batch.

The college initially operated from the building later known as the Old College Building, under its first principal, Radhanath Mishra. The Medical Council of India (MCI) at first declined to recognise BMC, citing inadequate infrastructure, so a new campus comprising the main college building, a hospital, hostels and staff quarters was developed. Construction began on 12 February 1961, and on its completion in 1966 the college moved to the new campus, receiving MCI approval in 1967. In 1969 it was renamed Veer Surendra Sai Medical College in honour of the 19th-century freedom fighter Veer Surendra Sai. The Government of Odisha declared the institution an autonomous body, effective 1 January 2015, and it was renamed the Veer Surendra Sai Institute of Medical Sciences and Research.

== Academics ==
VIMSAR offers undergraduate and postgraduate medical education as well as paramedical courses, and is recognised by the National Medical Commission (NMC). The undergraduate MBBS programme lasts four and a half years and is followed by a one-year compulsory rotating internship, with admission through the NEET-UG examination. Seats are divided between the All India Quota and the Odisha state quota administered through OJEE. The institute also offers postgraduate MD and MS degrees across a range of specialties, admission to which is through NEET-PG, as well as diploma courses in paramedical fields.

== Infrastructure ==
VIMSAR functions as a major tertiary-care teaching hospital for western Odisha. A six-storey super-specialty block was constructed on the campus with central funding; press reports placed its cost at roughly ₹150 crore during construction. The project, originally scheduled for completion in 2023, faced repeated delays.

The facility was inaugurated in May 2025 by the Union Minister and Sambalpur Member of Parliament Dharmendra Pradhan. According to reporting at the inauguration, it provides about 272 beds, including 58 intensive care unit beds, and houses nine specialist departments: urology, nephrology, neurology, neurosurgery, paediatric surgery, plastic surgery, gastroenterology, endocrinology and clinical haematology.

== Students' life ==
Undergraduate students are represented by a students' union elected annually, and postgraduate students by a body known as the Junior Doctors' Association. The institute periodically hosts an inter-medical-college cultural and sports festival.

== Notable alumni ==
- B. K. Misra – neurosurgeon and recipient of the Dr. B. C. Roy Award.
- Sambit Patra – politician and Bharatiya Janata Party spokesperson.

== See also ==
- List of medical colleges in India
- Education in India
