= Shri Jagannath Medical College and Hospital =

8th Medical College in Odisha located at Puri

- Other names: SJMCH, Puri
- Motto: dedicated to human service
- Type: Medical college and Hospital
- Established: 2021; 5 years ago
- Affiliations: Odisha University of Health Sciences, NMC
- Principal: Dr. Sabita Mohapatra
- Location: Samangara, Puri, Odisha, India 752002, Puri; 19.837°N 85.873°E
- Website: sjmch.odisha.gov.in

Shri Jagannath Medical College and Hospital (SJMCH, Puri) is a Government medical college in Puri, Odisha, where students may earn the Bachelor of Medicine and Bachelor of Surgery (MBBS) degree. Admission is based on merit using the National Eligibility and Entrance Test. Yearly undergraduate student intake is 100 with the first students arriving in 2021. SJMCH at Puri was built at a cost of around 300 crores on an area of 33 acres, and became the eighth government medical college in the state.

The college is located at the Samangara area of Puri city, approximately 7 km from Jagannath Temple, Puri and 28 km from Konark Sun Temple. It is recognised by the National Medical Commission.

== History ==
The Government of Odisha approved the proposal for the establishment of a medical college at Puri and it was named as Sri Jagannath Medical College. Establishment of the medical college missed the 2019 deadline and the first classes began in 2021.

== Courses offered ==
The college offers the MBBS degree under Odisha University of Health Sciences with an annual intake of 100. It is recognised by the National Medical Commission.
