= International Institute of Rehabilitation Sciences and Research =

Rehabilitation institute in India

- Parent institution: AASTHA CHARITABLE TRUST
- Founder: Mrs. Bishnupriya Mishra
- Established: 3 December 2007
- Focus: Rehabilitation institute
- Location: Bhubaneswar, Orissa, India
- Website: http://www.iirs.ac.in

The International Institute of Rehabilitation Sciences and Research (IIRS, Bhubaneswar) is managed by ASTHA Trust, founded by Mrs. Bishnupriya Mishra. The campus is located at Near CV Raman Global University, in Bhubaneswar, Orissa, India. The institution provides 3 year +10 month degree course called BASLP.

The Bachelor in Audiology and Speech Language Pathology (BASLP) course is a rehabilitative professional course standardized by the Rehabilitation Council of India. BASLP professionals (audiologist and speech language therapist) deal with persons with hearing and speech language problems. These professionals assess the existence of problem, severity, and type of problem as well as provide qualitative intervention to the persons with disabilities.

Their services includes assessing hearing impairment (type and degree of hearing loss with possible site of lesion), applying different audiological tests, assessment of speech, and language problem (type and severity). Besides assessment the professionals also give qualitative intervention to the patients to combat with the problem.

== Course description ==
The program consist of professional and academic component which leads to registration as an Audiologist by Rehabilitation Council of India. The program provides four year full-time study with 3 years institutional academic exposure and clinical exposure, and one full year of clinical placement and supervision that supports placement. During the three year degree period, students get knowledge in the below listed subjects:

- Audiology
- Linguistics
- Communication disorders
- Speech disorders
- Language disorders
- Voice disorders
- Anatomy(related to ENT)
- Physiology(Related to ENT)
- Pathology(related to ENT)
- Aural rehabilitation
- Pediatrics
- Neurology
- Electronics
- Computer application
- Clinical Psychology

== Departments ==
=== Audiology department ===
The department deals in academic and clinical activity such as assessment/ diagnosis, management, treatment, habilitation, rehabilitation, special education for hearing impaired, organising hearing check-up camps, early identification programs, awareness programs, etc.

=== Speech department ===
The department deals in both the academic and clinical activity such as assessment/ diagnosis, management, treatment of communication related problems, special education, recreation therapy, preschool facility for disabled, early identification programs, clinical conference, awareness programs, etc.

=== Psychology department ===
Provides both academic and psychological diagnosis of some speech problems, psychological assistance to clients and family members and links with community based rehabilitation.

== See also ==
- Utkal University
- American Speech-Language-Hearing Association (ASHA)
