= All India Institute of Medical Sciences, Bhubaneswar =

Medical college in Odisha, India

- Former name: Netaji Subhas Chandra Bose All India Institute of Medical Sciences
- Motto: "Karmanyeva Adhikaraste ma phaleshu kadhachana" "Para yaksham subami te"
- Type: Public Medical University
- Established: 2012; 14 years ago
- Budget: ₹851.05 crore (US$88 million) (FY 2024)
- President: Dr. Anita Saxena
- Director: Dr. Ashutosh Biswas
- Faculty: 252
- Students: 1,026
- Undergraduates: 623
- Postgraduates: 385
- Doctoral students: 18
- Location: Khordha, Odisha, India; 20°13′52″N 85°46′30″E
- Campus: 100 acres (40 ha); Urban
- Language: English
- Average OPD Attendance: 4,336 (2024)
- Website: aiimsbhubaneswar.nic.in
- Government of India (MoHFW)

Organisation
- Type: Teaching hospital

Services
- Standards: NMC, INI
- Emergency department: Level I Trauma Center
- Beds: 1,374

Helipads
- Helipad: No

All India Institute of Medical Sciences Bhubaneswar (AIIMS Bhubaneswar), formerly Netaji Subhas Chandra Bose All India Institute of Medical Sciences, is a medical college and medical research public university located in Bhubaneswar, Odisha, India. The institute operates autonomously under the aegis of the Ministry of Health and Family Welfare. It was established in 2012 and the foundation stone was laid by then prime minister Atal Bihari Vajpayee, on 15 July 2003.

== History ==
=== All-India Institute of Medical Sciences (Amendment) Bill, 2012 ===
The All-India Institute of Medical Sciences (Amendment) Bill, 2012, was introduced in the Lok Sabha on 27 August 2012. This bill replaced an ordinance that allowed the six AIIMS—like institutes to become operational by September 2012. Lok Sabha passed the AIIMS (Amendment) Bill, 2012 on 30 August 2012. The proposed measure helped the centre to change the status of the six new AIIMS registered under the Indian Societies Registration Act to be an Autonomous Corporate Body like the AIIMS in Delhi. AIIMS (Amendment) Bill, 2012 was introduced in Rajya Sabha on 3 September 2012 and passed on 4 September 2012.

=== Developments ===
- On 29 November 2012, AIIMS Bhubaneswar, in partnership with the OTTET, Bhubaneswar and Technical Assistance from SGPGI, Lucknow, started a regional telemedicine centre on its campus. A Department of Community Medicine and Family Medicine at AIIMS Bhubaneswar was inaugurated by RDC (Central Division) on 7 January 2013.
- The hospital facility at AIIMS Bhubaneswar opened in Summer 2013 with 1,000 beds and 39 specialty branches. A 75-bed hospital and a 10-bed Intensive care unit (ICU) began functioning in August 2013. There will be wards with 15 beds each for cancer, obstetrics and gynaecology, medicine, ophthalmology and surgery.
- On 26 February 2014, the institute's hospital was formally inaugurated.

== Location ==
AIIMS Bhubaneswar is situated in Sijua neighbourhood of Bhubaneswar and is built on about 40 ha (100 acres) of land. AIIMS – Bhubaneswar is divided into three sections: a hospital, medical college, and residential complex. The hospital was built by AIIMS at a cost of ₹2.64 billion (US$27 million). Approximately ₹1 billion (US$10 million) was projected to be spent for the construction of the medical college and ₹500 million (US$5.2 million) for the construction of the student housing. There will also be a 350-bed satellite location in Kalama village, Jaleswar block, Balasore district. The 978-bed AIIMS Bhubaneswar was inaugurated by Union Health and Family Welfare Minister Ghulam Nabi Azad on 26 February 2014.

== Campus ==
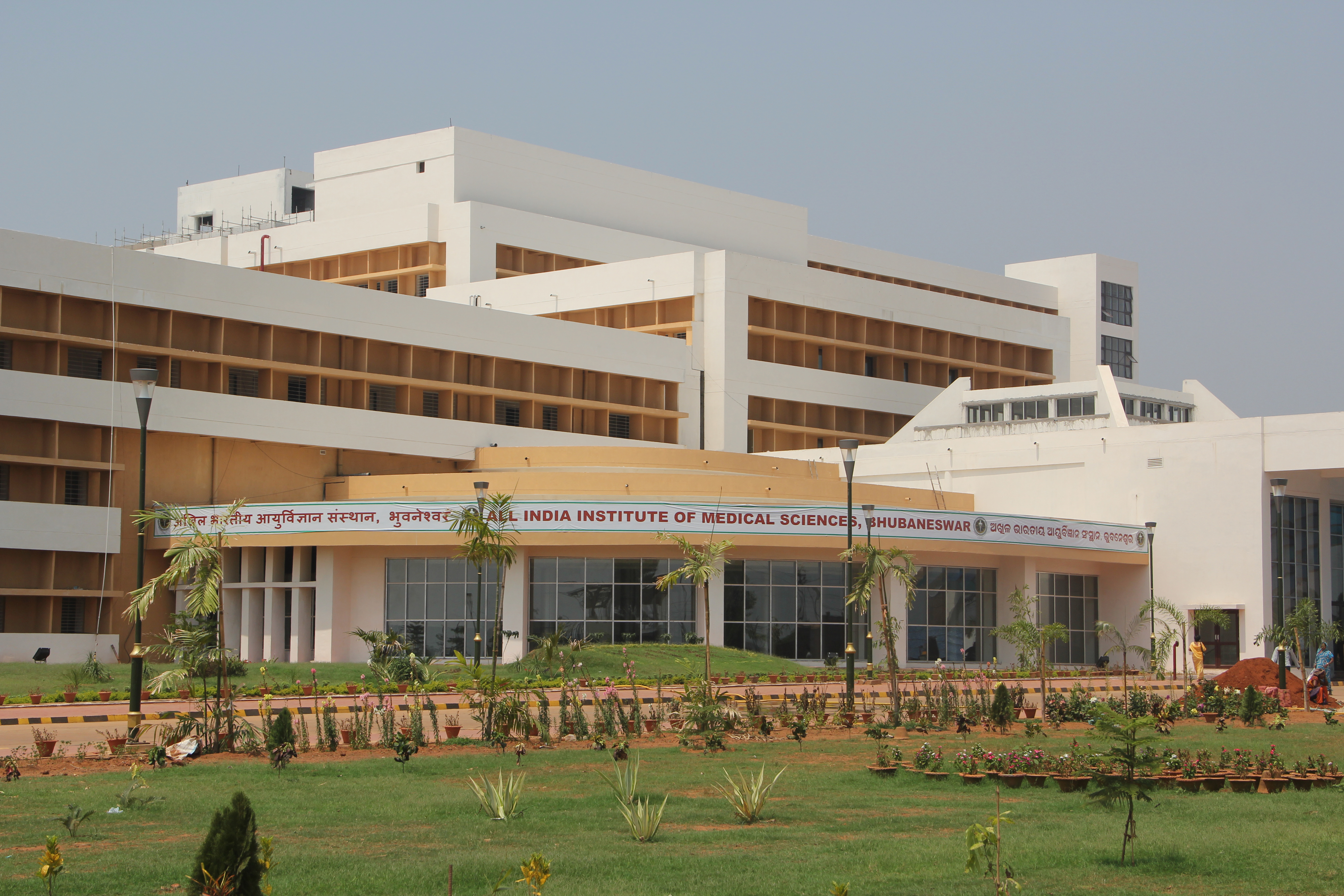
AIIMS Bhubaneswar

The AIIMS Campus extends over 40 ha (100 acres), consisting of the hospital complex and residential area. The hospital complex consists of a 900-bed multi-speciality hospital with 43 departments. The Academic Area present in the complex houses the Academic Block, the College of Nursing and the Central Library. The Academic Blocks consists of 4 Lecture Halls and Departmental Laboratories of Anatomy, Physiology, Biochemistry, Pathology, Microbiology, Pharmacology, Forensic Medicine, and Community Medicine. All the 41 departments have departmental cabins, laboratories, a library room as well as conference rooms. A stationery and snacks outlet is also housed in the Academic Building. The Academic Building also houses the offices of Director, Dean, Administration and other staff departments like Finance, Electric, Engineers and the central library. The residential complex consists of three boys hostels and two girls Hostels for Undergraduate Students of MBBS, Nursing and Allied Sciences. The hostels have an 800-room capacity. Four Postgraduate Hostels along with four Staff and Faculty Blocks are also present. The Director's Bungalow and Guest House is located near Main Residential Gate.

== Hospital Services ==
The hospital has a total of 43 Departments including the pre-clinical, para-clinical, speciality and super-speciality departments. It houses about 920 beds including private beds with 40 additional disaster beds. A New Trauma Level 1 Centre and Burn Speciality Building is under construction. A 500-Bed Patient Relative Resting Shelter "Dharamsala" supported by NALCO is also completed and will soon be opened for public use. Telemedicine Services are provided through a dedicated application called "AIIMS Bhubaneswar Swasthya App" developed by CDAC Noida. Other than this WhatsApp and voice call facilities are also provided. As part of COVID CARE, Convalescent Plasma Therapy had been started in Hospital.

== Academics ==
The first academic year began on 21 September 2012 with a class of 50 MBBS students. The Second class of 100 undergraduate students from across India began in August 2013. The 1st Nursing class of 60 students were admitted in September 2013.

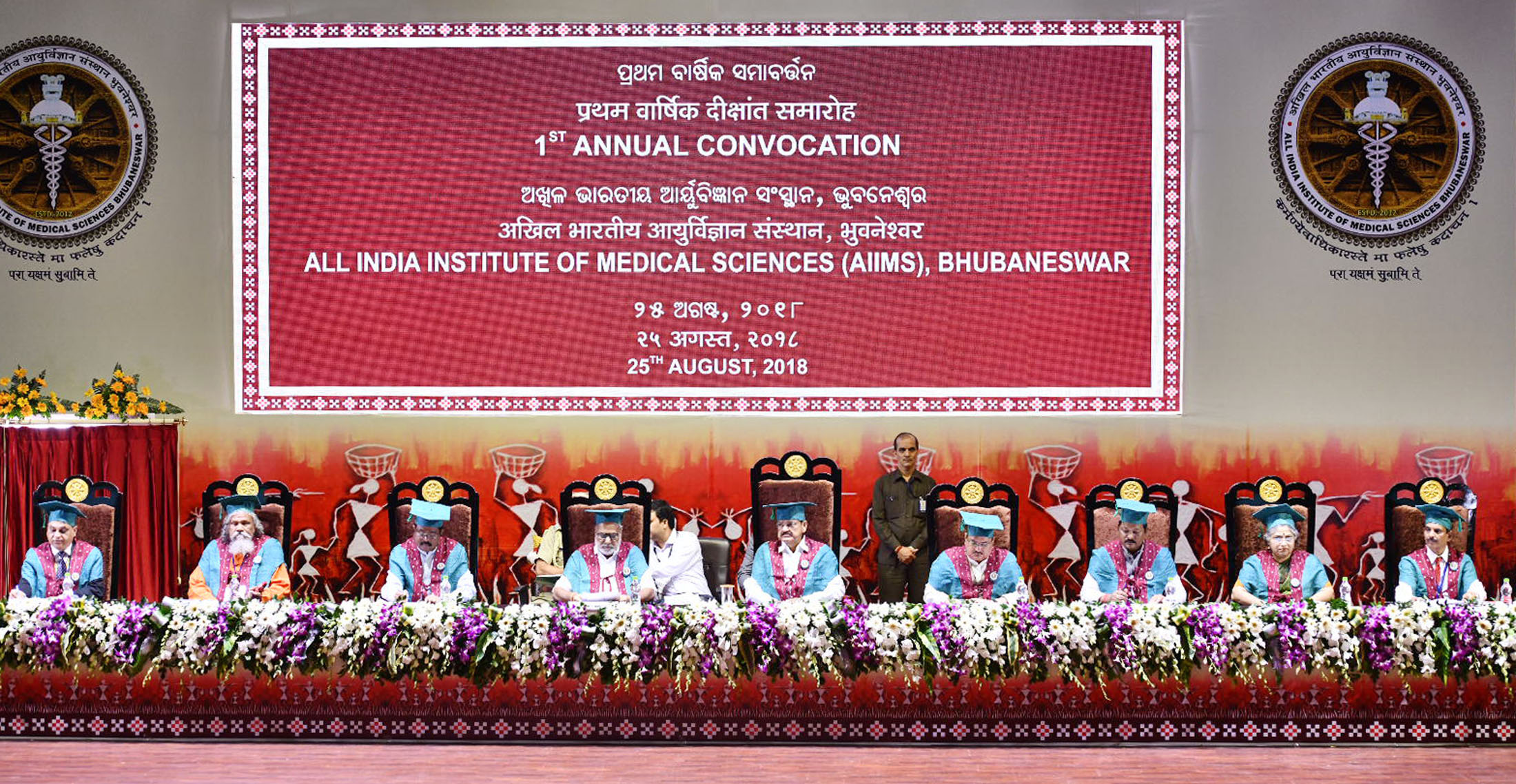
The Vice President, Shri M. Venkaiah Naidu at the first Convocation of AIIMS, Bhubaneswar on 25 August 2018

=== Ranking ===
University rankings

Medical – India
- NIRF (2024): 15

AIIMS Bhubaneswar ranked 15th in India by the National Institutional Ranking Framework (NIRF) medical ranking for 2024. Thus, it is the 3rd best AIIMS after AIIMS, Delhi and AIIMS, Rishikesh.

== Satellite centre ==
There is a plan to set up a satellite centre of AIIMS Bhubneshwar at Balasore, on an area of about 25 acres (0.10 km^{2}).

The foundation stone for satellite centre at Balasore was laid on 25 August 2018 by Union Minister of Health J. P. Nadda. The 10-ha (24.91-acre) centre will have a 300-bed multi-specialty hospital.

== Directors ==
- Ashok Kumar Mahapatra (2012–2016)
- Gitanjali Batmanabane (2016–2021)
- Mukesh Tripathi (2021–2022) (additional charge)
- Ashutosh Biswas (2022–)

== Student life ==
The students are represented by the Students' Union AIIMS Bhubaneswar, headed by an executive body that is elected every year of 6th semester students voted by all the students from 2nd semester. The first Students' Union was elected on 27 February 2015 after the first batch attended 6th semester and was headed by founder president Dr. Sambit Sagar and vice president Dr. Avnish Kumar Singh. The first Students' Union is credited with organising the first ever Inter-AIIMS Inter-Medics fest named Chiasma 2K16 from 4 to 7 February 2016 acknowledging AIIMS Bhubaneswar as the first institution amongst its siblings to take such an initiative. The medi-fest registered participation of medical students from AIIMS along with medical students from state government and private medical colleges who showcased their talents. The next chiasma 2k19 was organised by the Students' Union of 2014 class of medical students from all over India. Prof. Dr. Subrat Kumar Acharya was nominated as President of AIIMS Bhubaneswar in November 2018. He was awarded Padma Shree in 2014 for his contribution in the field of medicine and has been associated with AIIMS for 40 years.

The first convocation of AIIMS, Bhubaneshwar was held on 25 August. The Vice-President of India, Venkaiah Naidu, was the chief guest of the convocation. In his speech, he called for posting of young doctors in rural area for their first 3 years.
