= Rehabilitation Council of India =

Regulator of programmes for the disabled

- Abbreviation: RCI
- Formation: June 1993; 33 years ago
- Headquarters: New Delhi
- Chairperson: Dr. Sharanjeet Kaur
- Main organ: Council
- Affiliations: Department of Higher Education, Ministry of Education
- Website: rehabcouncil.nic.in

The Rehabilitation Council of India (RCI) is the apex government body, set up under an Act of Parliament, to regulate training programmes and courses targeted at disabled, disadvantaged, and special education requirement communities. It is the only statutory council in India that is required to maintain the Central Rehabilitation Register which mainly documents details of all qualified professionals who operate and deliver training and educational programmes for the targeted communities. In the year 2000, the Rehabilitation Council of India (Amendment) Act, 2000, was introduced and notified consequently by the government of India. The amendment brought definitions and discussions provided within the earlier Rehabilitation Council of India Act, 1992, under the ambit of a larger act, namely, Persons with Disabilities (Equal Opportunities, Protection of Rights and Full Participation) Act, 1995.

== Background ==
The Rehabilitation Council of India (RCI) was set up as a registered society in 1986. In September 1992 the RCI Act was enacted by Parliament and it became a Statutory Body on 22 June 1993. The Act was amended by Parliament in 2000 to make it more broad-based. The mandate given to RCI is to regulate and monitor services given to persons with disability, to standardise syllabi and to maintain a Central Rehabilitation Register of all qualified professionals and personnel working in the field of Rehabilitation and Special Education. The Act also prescribes punitive action against unqualified persons delivering services to persons with disability.

== Approved institutions ==
As of 21 October 2022, the list of approved institutions published by the council includes 887 institutions.

== Courses offered ==
The Rehabilitation Council of India does not provide courses directly; it is a regulatory body that regulates many courses offered by organizations.

1. Certificate courses
2. Diploma courses
3. PG Diploma courses
4. Degree Courses
5. Post-graduate degree courses/ master's level courses
6. Short-term/ refresher courses under the Continuing Rehabilitation Education programme
