= Olatapur =

- Village
- Location in Orissa, India
- Coordinates: 20.897527°N 86.543695°E
- Country: India
- State: Orissa
- District: Bhadrak

Languages
  - Official: Oriya
- Time zone: UTC+5:30 (IST)
- Vehicle registration: OD-22, (formerly OR-22)

Olatapur is a village located in Bhadrak district of Odisha, India. The village is close to the spiritual place akhandalamani (aradi).
