= Gandhi Institute of Advanced Computer & Research, Rayagada =

Engineering institute in Rayagada, India

- Type: Public Education Research & Business Institution
- Established: 1999
- Affiliations: BPUT AICTE
- Chairman: Prof. (Dr) Chandra Dhawaj Panda
- Location: Rayagada, Odisha, India; 19.184236°N 83.401390°E
- Campus: Rayagada
- Website: www.giacr.ac.in

Gandhi Institute of Advanced Computer & Research, Rayagada (GIACR), formerly IACR, is an engineering college located in Rayagada, in the state of Odisha, India. It was established in 1999 by Rabindranath Educational Trust, Rayagada with the approval of AICTE, New Delhi and Government of Odisha and affiliated to Biju Patnaik University of Technology. GIACR is certified with ISO 9001:2008 by Bureau Veritas for the Quality Management System.

== Academics ==
Initially (postgraduate) M.C.A. course was introduced and MBA was introduced in 2006. Since 2004, GIACR offers 06 undergraduate B.Tech courses in CSE, IT, ECE, EEE, Civil Engineering and Mechanical Engineering. Admission is through the Odisha Joint Entrance Examination (OJEE). It also offers Diploma courses in Civil Engineering & Mechanical Engineering.
