= ASBM University =

University in Odisha, India

- Motto: Rewritting the mantra of Excellence
- Type: Private
- Established: 2006
- Affiliations: UGC
- President: Prof. Biswajeet Pattanayak
- Vice-Chancellor: Prof. R. K. Bal
- Location: Bhubaneswar, Odisha, India; 20°20′16″N 85°44′34″E
- Campus: Urban
- Website: www.asbm.ac.in

ASBM University, formerly Asian School of Business Management, was established in 2006 as a private business school. In the year 2019, the institute was granted the status of a university. It facilitates management education in Odisha. It was founded by Professor Dr. Biswajeet Pattanayak who is known to many for ‘Lagaan’- a movie which looked into IIM classrooms and corporate board rooms. ASBM University courses are mostly in the fields of innovation, business intelligence, leadership skills, technology, law, and accounting education.

== Founder and director ==
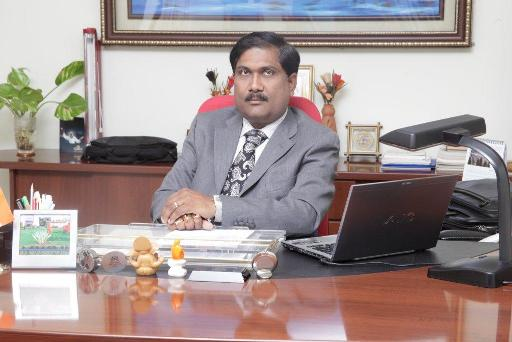
Prof. Biswajeet Pattanayak

Prof. Dr. Biswajeet Pattanayak is the founder director of ASBM University. He has Ph.D. and D.Litt. in organizational behaviour, D.Sc. in management science and is a Fellow of All India Management Association (AIMA), New Delhi. The institution is headed by Shri Ravindra Chamaria, who is the chairman, and Mr. G. Upadhyaya, who is the associate chairman.

== Accreditation and ranking ==
ASBM University provides Post Graduate Diploma (PGDM) and undergraduate degree in management which is duly approved and recognized by AICTE. PGDM has accreditation by National Board of Accreditation (NBA) and the Government of India. The Association of Indian Universities (AIU) recognizes ASBM's PGDM as equivalent to MBA.

ASBM University is a Life member of Association of Management Development Institutions in South Asia (AMDISA). The institution is an Academic member of Retailers Association of India (RAI).

== Collaborations ==
ASBM University has academic collaborations with:

- California State University, USA
- St. Cloud University, United States
- Universidad Argentina de la Empresa
- North Carolina Central University (USA student exchange, research & internship).

== Courses ==
ASBM University offers a variety of undergraduate and postgraduate programs through its five specialized schools. Each school focuses on a distinct academic area.

ASBM School of Business

Focuses on management education.

- Master in Business Administration
- Bachelor in Business Administration
- 5 Year Integrated MBA
- Master’s in Human Resource Management & LR
- Ph.D. in Management

ASBM School of Accountancy

Offers programs in commerce and accounting.

- Masters in Commerce
- Bachelor in Commerce
- Ph.D. in Commerce

ASBM School of Liberal Arts

- M.A. in Applied Psychology
- M.A. in Economics
- M.A. in English
- B.A. in Liberal Arts
- B.A. in Psychology
- B.A. in Economics
- B.A. in English

ASBM School of Information System

Specializes in information technology education.

- Master of Computer Application
- M. Tech Information Technology
- B. Tech – Computer Science & Information Technology
- B. Sc. -Information Technology Management
- Bachelor of Computer Application

ASBM School of Law

Offers integrated law degrees.

- BBA LL.B. (Hons.)
- BA LL.B. (Hons.)
- LL.M

== Awards ==
- Excellence in Education award – 2013, by the Competition Success Review
