= Sri Jayadev College of Pharmaceutical Sciences =

Pharmacy College in Bhubaneswar, Odisha, India established 1983

Sri Jayadev College of pharmaceutical sciences
- Sri Jayadev College of pharmaceutical sciences
- Type: Private Pharmacy College
- Established: 1983
- Affiliations: AICTE, BPUT, PCI
- Chairman: Dr. Prafulla Chandra Tripathy
- Principal: Prof. (Dr.) Nilima Shukla
- Students: 400+
- Undergraduates: BPharm, DPharma
- Postgraduates: MPharm
- Location: Bhubaneswar, Odisha, India; 20.328913°N 85.872263°E
- Campus: Urban, Naharkanta
- Nickname: SJCPS
- Website: https://sjcpsodisha.org

Sri Jayadev College of pharmaceutical sciences is a college in Bhubaneswar, Odisha, India providing Pharmacy education since 1983.

== Academics ==
For D.Pharm, B.Pharm & M.Pharm.

Discipline	Course	Seats
B.Pharm	Pharmacy	60
M.Pharm	Pharmaceutics	18
M.Pharm	Pharmaceutical Chemistry	10
M.Pharm	Pharmacology	18
M.Pharm	Pharmaceutical Analysis & Quality Assurance	18
