= Srirama Chandra Bhanja Medical College and Hospital =

Top medical college in Eastern India

- Other names: S.C.B. Medical College and Hospital
- Motto: Citius Altius Fortius (Faster, Higher, Stronger)
- Type: Government
- Established: 1 June 1944; 82 years ago
- Academic affiliations: Odisha University of Health Sciences
- Principal: Dr. Prativa Panda
- Undergraduates: 250 per year (MBBS); 63 per year (BDS)
- Postgraduates: 229 per year (MD/MS); 27 (MDS)
- Doctoral students: 42 per year (DM/MCh)
- Location: Cuttack, Odisha, India; 20.473°N 85.891°E
- Campus: 87 acres (35 ha); Urban
- Website: scbmch.in

Srirama Chandra Bhanja Medical College and Hospital, also known as S.C.B Medical College and Hospital, is a public medical college in Cuttack, Odisha, India. It is named after Sriram Chandra Bhanj Deo, the Maharajah of the Mayurbhanj princely state.

It is one of the oldest centers of medical teaching and training in India. It is located near Mangalabag and Ranihat area in the heart of the city Cuttack with a campus of 101 acres (410,000 m^{2}). It has been recognised by the National Medical Commission (NMC). It is an undergraduate institution with education and training in medical and surgical specialties. In 2019, for its Platinum Jubilee, the then CM Naveen Patnaik announced the redevelopment and expansion of the institution under 5T plan. The medical college will be redeveloped as an AIIMS-plus institution with 5,000 beds in two phases, at an estimated investment of around ₹5000 Crore.(S.C.B. Mega Redevelopment Plan)

== History ==
The institution dates back to the beginning of the 19th century. It started as a small dispensary and first aid centre on the site of the present medical college during the days of Maharatha rule in the latter half of the 18th century. The dispensary gave medical assistance to pilgrims en route to and from Puri, especially during the "Car Festival" of Lord Jagannath.

The dispensary continued to function until the British occupation of Orissa in 1803. The British rulers realised the strategic importance of the dispensary at Cuttack and converted it into small hospital. They made provisions funding from the "Annachhatra Fund".

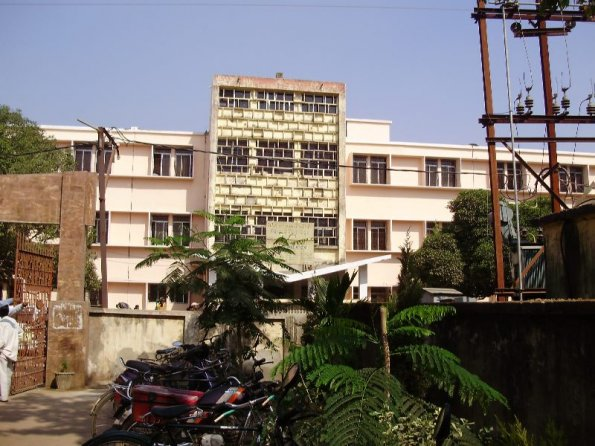
Office of the Superintendent

In 1875, the Orissa Medical School was established by Madras (Chennai) born Scottish doctor William Day Stewart, then Civil Surgeon of Cuttack, as its first principal. He was supported with the patronage of the then Lt Governor, Richard Temple and Divisional Commissioner, T.E Ravenshaw. Stewart died on 23 November 1890, aged 50, and was buried at the local Gora Kabar cemetery.

Initially, the Orissa Medical School was established with a capacity of 20 Licentiate Medical Practitioners (LMP) students. It was affiliated to the Bihar and Orissa Medical Examination Board, which granted the LMP Diploma.

In 1944, the Orissa Medical School was renamed Orissa Medical College, and Major A.T Anderson, the then Civil Surgeon of Cuttack, acted as its first principal.

Major A.T Anderson, the then Civil Surgeon of Cuttack, supported by Lt Col. A. N. Chopra, the then Director of Health and I. G. Prisons, wanted to improved the school along the lines of UK medical schools. They recommended to the Government to upgrade the existing medical school to the status of college. The Parla Ministry, consisting of the Maharaja of Paralakhemundi, Maharaja Krushna Chandra Gajapati Dev, Mr Abdus Subhan Khan (Minister of Health and Education) and Pandit Godabrish Misra approved, and the Orissa Medical College was established on 1 June 1944 with a capacity of 22 students in the MBBS Degree Course.

The college was affiliated to Utkal University. The college received recognition for the MBBS degree from the Medical Council of India in 1952, with retrospective effect.

In 1951, the Orissa Medical College was subsequently renamed Srirama Chandra Bhanja Medical College in recognition of the donation and efforts by Maharaja Sriram Chandra Bhanj Deo of Mayurbhanj State. Maharaja Vikram Deo Verma of Jeypore State, the founding father of Andhra University, also donated ₹1,30,000 to the medical college.

The college received recognition for MBBS degree from the National Medical Commission in 1952, with retrospective effect. Postgraduate courses in M.D./M.S. specialties were started in 1960. Since 1981, post-doctoral training leading to the award of D.M. and M.Ch. degrees have been instituted in the disciplines of Cardiology and Neurosurgery respectively.

== Academics ==
The intakes for MBBS course and the postgraduate courses are 250 and 150 respectively. A dental wing teaches for B.D.S. degrees. At present this college extends facility for postgraduate training in the 21 broad specialties.

The college offers the four-and-a-half-year M.B.B.S. course with a one-year compulsory rotating internship in affiliated hospitals. There are 250 places, which are filled through a single window all India medical test known as NEET-UG. Of the 250 places, 85% are reserved for state quota and rest 15% are for All India Quota (AIQ). Admission in this course is extremely competitive.

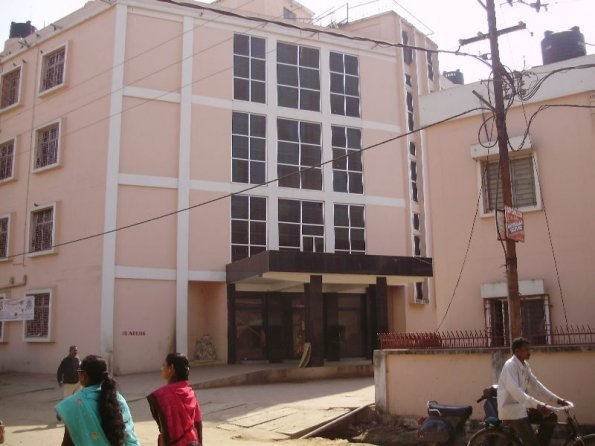
Department of Microbiology

The college offers more than 150 places in post graduate courses. Admission to these courses is through the Odisha Post Graduate Medical Examination (50%) and at the national level through the NEET-PG.

National programmes include as family welfare training at the Regional Family Welfare Training Centre, Post Partum Programme attached to Obstetrics & Gynaecology Department, ICMR Programme, IGNOU study center, regional spinal injury center and treatment of geriatric patients in Geriatric OPD.

=== Ranking ===
University and college rankings

Medical – India
- NIRF (2022): 44

Sriram Chandra Bhanj Deo Medical College ranked 44 in India by the National Institutional Ranking Framework medical ranking for 2022.

== Student life ==
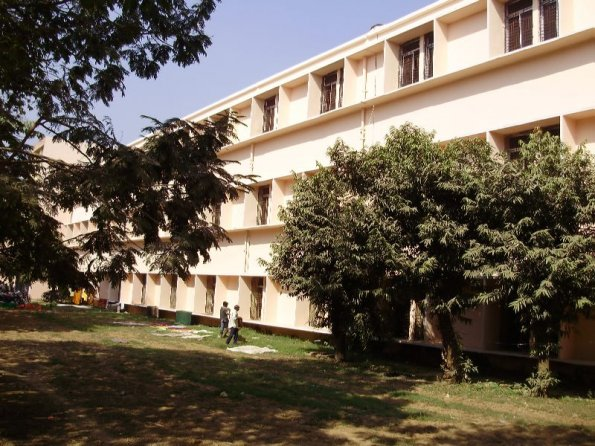
Old Gents Hostel

Undergraduate and post graduate students come from all over India. The campus has five hostels including Old Gents Hostel and New Gents Hostel for undergraduate men. It has one hostel each for undergraduate women, postgraduate women, postgraduate men, house staff students and nursing students.

Both undergraduate (UG Students' Union) and post graduate students (Junior Doctor's Association) have their respective unions. Representatives of the student body are elected annually in a campus-wide election.

The inter-collegiate cultural, literary and sports festival of SCB Medical College is called Synapse and is held between late December and early January every year, organised by the Students Union. In addition, the Students Union holds annual inter-class competitions where undergraduate students compete in cultural, literary and sporting events.

The campus also has a gymnasium, and grounds for cricket, tennis and basketball. It has also a swimming pool for students.

=== Library ===
The student library has more than 500 seats, with sections for undergraduate and postgraduate students. The Central Library is one of the referral medical libraries in the state of Odisha. It was declared as a resource library in the Eastern Region by the Government of India in 1993.The Central Library, SCB Medical College and Hospital, Cuttack, is located in the Academic Block of Sri Ramchandra Bhanja Medical College and Hospital, Cuttack.

=== Medical facilities ===
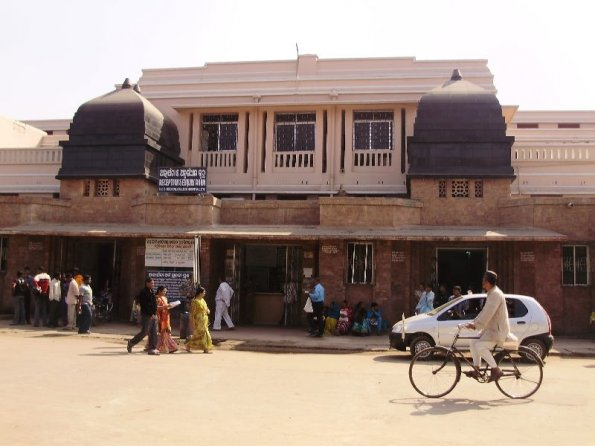
Out Patient Department

The hospital provides services at its Outpatient department, Casualty and a wide range of specialist services.

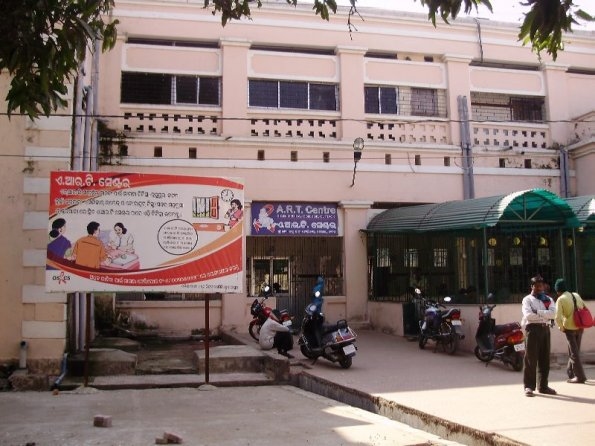
ART Center

Super specialty services of the hospital include the following:

- Acharya Harihar Regional Cancer Centre
- Shishu Bhavan for Pediatric Patients
- Regional Spinal Injury Center
- Regional Center for Ophthalmology
- Regional Center for Tuberculosis
- Intermediate Reference Laboratory
- Cardiology Center
- Antiretroviral Therapy Center

A multi-specialty trauma center is under construction for special care of trauma patients.

=== Telemedicine services ===
In 2001, the telemedicine service was established, in collaboration with ISRO and Sanjay Gandhi Post Graduate Institute of Medical Sciences, Lucknow, providing distant medical education to medical students, tele consultation for critically ill patients, follow-up treatment facility for patients and tele medical video conferences.
