= Maharaja Krushna Chandra Gajapati Medical College and Hospital =

Medical college in Odisha

Coordinates: 19.307670°N 84.810972°E

Maharaja Krishna Chandra Gajapati Medical College and Hospital
- Official Seal of MKCGMCH
- Other names: MKCG Medical College and Hospital
- Motto in English: Freedom from Sickness to all people
- Type: Government college
- Established: 1962; 64 years ago
- Affiliations: Odisha University of Health Sciences
- Principal: Dr. Harikrishna Dalai
- Undergraduates: 250 per year
- Postgraduates: 142 per year
- Doctoral students: 4 per year
- Location: Brahmapur, Odisha, India
- Campus: Urban
- Website: www.mkcgmch.org

Maharaja Krishna Chandra Gajapati Medical College and Hospital Brahmapur, Ganjam, Odisha is a government medical college and hospital that started functioning in 1962 as a medical college and 1966 as a hospital. Subsequently, the medical college and the attached hospital were renamed after the late Maharaja of Parlakhemundi, Ganjam, Krishna Chandra Gajapati. It also has a college of nursing, which was the first nursing college in Odisha, established in 1983. Courses available in this college are basic BSc nursing, post basic BSc nursing and MSc nursing.In 2019, it introduced a new course of CHO (Community Health Officer). Campus area of MKCG MCH is about 162 acres.

== Organisation ==
It operates with 23 clinical departments, 8 non-clinical and para-clinical departments and with 1190 beds. A tele-medicine unit, provided by the ISRO, is operational.

It imparts medical education to 250 undergraduate students, 116 post-graduate medical students, 2 DM (cardiology) and 2 DM (endocrinology) superspeciality students, 80 diploma students in medical laboratory technology and 30 diploma students in medical radiation technology.

MKCG Medical College and Hospital, being the only major medical institution in Southern Odisha, also serves as a referral hospital. A blood bank is in a separate building in the medical compound. Recently the building for the Regional Diagnostic Centre was completed, and it is ready to start functioning with facilities for a variety of diagnoses and investigations.

The hospital has two new buildings, dedicated to a trauma centre and an improved neurology department. Within the compound there is a forensic and toxicology department; a new, upgraded, mortuary, in addition to this there is a new orthopaedics building; a new paediatrics building; and a new medicine building. There has been much infrastructure development like the Central Library, New Casualty Department, Microbiology Department and Oncology Department.

The Central Library is sanctioned with a budget of 9 crore. The building is designed according to AIIMS style. It has five floors with complete AC . Opens for 8 am to 10 pm daily in working days. (9 am to 4 pm in 2nd nd 4th Saturday nd Sunday)

It has academic block of 4 floor building having 4 well designed centrally air conditioning lecture theatres and 4 examination hall.

Also a 650 seated seminar hall named as lt 650 with Central Ac .

A nicely designed 2500 seated auditorium is also present.

Residential quarters are provided on the campus for the teaching and non-teaching staff of the college and hospital.

This medical college has the largest campus of the government medical colleges in Odisha.

=== Undergraduate courses ===
MKCG offers the four and half year MBBS course with one year compulsory rotating internship in affiliated hospitals to a maximum of 250 students per year.

Admission to this college in MBBS course is extremely competitive and strictly on the basis of merit after occupation by caste reservation. Out of 250, 38 seats are filled through all India quota of National Eligibility cum Entrance Test conducted by the NTA and the remaining 212 seats are filled through the state quota through a series of counselling. State quota students can apply through OJEE website.

== Student life ==
=== Undergraduate hostels ===
There are 4 gents hostels and 3 ladies hostels in the campus for the students pursuing the MBBS course. GH-1, GH-2 and GH-3 are the senior UG hostels and GH-4 is the newly inaugurated hostel for first year UG students.

=== House officer's hostel ===
There is a House Officer's Hostel inside the campus. Just beside the P.G hostel 2

=== Post-graduate hostels ===
There are now 3 PG hostels (PG-1, PG-2, New PG hostel) for men and one for women.

=== Sports facility ===
There is a large playground near men's hostel 2 in its campus that hosts annual athletic meet and sports events of the college. The campus has a basketball court near Gent's hostel 1, two volleyball courts, two outdoor badminton courts and one indoor badminton court.
