= List of colleges affiliated to the Biju Patnaik University of Technology =

Biju Patnaik University of Technology, also known as BPUT, is located in Rourkela in the state of Odisha, India. There are 110 colleges affiliated to the university. A college may be either a constituent or affiliated type.

The colleges are further classified as government run, private unaided and public private partnership (PPP) or private aided. A government run college is fully supported financially by the Government of Odisha. A private unaided college is funded by the private organisation. A private public partnership (PPP) college is established by state government in collaboration with private bodies, thus is partially funded by the government.

== Table legend ==
Name in table	Department
AE & IE	Applied Electronics & Instrumentation Engineering
AUTO	Automobile Engineering
Biomed	Biomedical Engineering
Biotech	Biotechnology
Chem	Chemical Engineering
Civil	Civil Engineering
Comp	Computer Science and Engineering
E & C	Electronics and Communication Engineering
Elect	Electrical Engineering
EEE	Electrical and Electronics Engineering
E & TC	Electronics & Telecommunication Engineering
ENV	Environmental Engineering
EIE	Electronics & Instrumentation Engineering
FT	Fashion Technology
IT	Information Technology
Mech	Mechanical Engineering
MANU	Manufacturing Science & Engineering
MET	Metallurgy & Material Science
Mineral	Mineral Engineering
Mining	Mining Engineering
Plastic	Plastics Engineering
Textile	Textile Engineering
Other	Any other course(s) offered by the college

== Colleges offering B.Tech ==
=== Government colleges ===
College Name	Type	EIE	Chem	Civil	Comp	EEE	ECE	E & TC	ELECT	AE & IE	IT	MECH	Other
Central Institute of Plastic Engineering and Technology, Bhubaneswar	Affiliated	No	No	No	No	No	No	No	No	No	No	No	MANU, Plastic
Government College of Engineering, Kalahandi	Constituent	No	No	Yes	Yes	No	No	No	Yes	No	No	Yes	No
Indira Gandhi Institute of Technology, Sarang	Affiliated	No	Yes	Yes	Yes	No	Yes	No	Yes	No	No	Yes	MET
Government College of Engineering, Keonjhar	Constituent	No	No	Yes	Yes	No	No	No	Yes	No	No	Yes	MET, MINING, MINERAL
Parala Maharaja Engineering College, Berhampur	Constituent	Yes	Yes	Yes	Yes	No	No	No	Yes	No	No	Yes	Automobile engineering

=== Private colleges ===
College Name	EIE	Chem		Comp	EEE	ECE	E & TC	ELECT	AE & IE	IT	MECH	Other
Adarsha College of Engineering	No	No	Yes	Yes	Yes	Yes	No	Yes	No	No	Yes	Mining Engineering
Ajay Binay Institute of Technology, Cuttack	Yes	No	Yes	Yes	Yes	No	No	Yes	No	No	Yes	No
Apex Institute of Technology & Management	Yes	No	No	Yes	Yes	Yes	No	No	No	Yes	Yes	No
Aryan Institute of Engineering and Technology	No	No	Yes	Yes	Yes	Yes	No	Yes	No	No	Yes	No
Balasore College of Engineering & Technology, Balasore	Yes	No	No	Yes	No	No	Yes	Yes	No	Yes	Yes	No
Bhadrak Institute of Engineering & Technology, Bhadrak	No	No	Yes	Yes	No	No	Yes	Yes	No	Yes	Yes	No
Bhubaneswar College of Engineering	No	No	Yes	Yes	No	Yes	No	No	No	No	Yes	No
Bhubaneswar Engineering College	No	No	Yes	Yes	Yes	No	Yes	No	No	No	Yes	No
Bhubaneswar Institute of Industrial Technology, Khurda	No	No	Yes	Yes	Yes	Yes	No	Yes	No	No	Yes	MET
Bhubaneswar Institute of Technology	No	No	Yes	Yes	Yes	Yes	No	No	No	No	Yes	No
Black Diamond College of Engineering & Technology, Jharsuguda	No	No	No	Yes	No	No	Yes	Yes	No	No	Yes	No
BRM International Institute of Technology	No	No	Yes	Yes	Yes	Yes	No	Yes	No	Yes	Yes	IT
Capital Engineering College, Khurda	No	No	No	Yes	Yes	Yes	No	Yes	No	No	Yes	No
C. V. Raman College of Engineering, Bhubaneshwar	No	Yes	Yes	Yes	No	No	Yes	Yes	Yes	Yes	Yes	Marine Engineering
College of Engineering	No	No	Yes	Yes	Yes	No	Yes	Yes	No	Yes	Yes	AUTO
Dhaneswar Rath Institute of Engineering and Management Studies, Cuttack	No	No	Yes	Yes	No	No	Yes	Yes	Yes	Yes	Yes	No
Eastern Academy of Science and Technology, Bhubaneswar	No	No	No	Yes	No	Yes	No	Yes	No	No	Yes	ENV
Einstein Academy of Technology & Management	No	No	Yes	Yes	Yes	Yes	No	Yes	No	No	Yes	No
Eklavya College of Technology & Science	No	No	No	Yes	Yes	Yes	No	No	Yes	No	Yes	No
Gandhi Academy of Technology & Engineering	No	No	Yes	No	No	Yes	No	Yes	No	No	Yes	No
Gandhi Engineering College	No	No	No	Yes	Yes	Yes	No	No	No	No	Yes	No
Gandhi Institute for Education and Technology, Bhubaneswar	No	No	Yes	Yes	Yes	Yes	No	No	No	No	Yes	No
Gandhi Institute For Technology, Bhubaneswar	No	No	Yes	Yes	Yes	Yes	No	Yes	No	Yes	Yes	No
Gandhi Institute of Advanced Computer and Research	No	No	Yes	Yes	Yes	Yes	No	Yes	No	No	Yes	No
Gandhi Institute of Excellent Technocrats	No	No	Yes	Yes	No	Yes	No	Yes	No	No	Yes	No
Gandhi Institute of Engineering and Technology, Gunupur	No	Yes	Yes	Yes	Yes	Yes	No	Yes	Yes	Yes	Yes	Biotech, MET
Gandhi Institute of Industrial Technology	No	No	No	Yes	Yes	Yes	No	No	No	Yes	Yes	No
Gandhi Institute of Science and Technology	No	No	Yes	Yes	Yes	Yes	No	Yes	No	Yes	Yes	No
Gandhi Institute for Technological Advancement	No	No	No	Yes	Yes	Yes	No	Yes	No	No	Yes	No
Gandhi Institute of Technology & Management	No	No	No	Yes	Yes	Yes	No	Yes	No	No	Yes	No
Ghanashyama Hemalata Institute of Technology and Management, Puri	No	No	No	Yes	No	No	Yes	Yes	No	No	Yes	No
Gopal Krushna College of Engineering & Technology	No	No	Yes	No	No	No	Yes	Yes	No	No	Yes	No
Gurukul College of Engineering for Women	No	No	Yes	Yes	Yes	No	Yes	No	Yes	No	Yes	No
Gurukula Institute of Technology	No	No	Yes	Yes	Yes	Yes	No	No	No	Yes	Yes	No
Hitech College of Engineering	No	No	Yes	Yes	Yes	Yes	No	No	No	No	Yes	No
Hi-Tech Institute of Technology	No	No	Yes	Yes	Yes	Yes	No	No	No	Yes	Yes	No
Indic Institute of Design And Research	No	No	Yes	Yes	Yes	Yes	No	Yes	Yes	No	Yes	No
Indotech College of Engineering	No	No	Yes	Yes	Yes	No	Yes	Yes	No	No	Yes	No
College of Engineering, Bhubaneswar	No	No	Yes	Yes	Yes	Yes	No	Yes	No	No	Yes	No
International Institute of Engineering & Technology, Khurda	No	No	No	Yes	No	Yes	No	Yes	No	No	Yes	No
Jagannath Institute of Engineering & Technology	Yes	Yes	No	Yes	Yes	Yes	Yes	Yes	No	No	Yes	No
Kalam Institute of Technology	No	No	Yes	Yes	Yes	Yes	No	No	No	Yes	Yes	No
KMBB College of Engineering & Technology	No	No	Yes	Yes	Yes	Yes	No	Yes	No	No	Yes	No
Konark Institute of Science and Technology	No	No	Yes	Yes	No	No	Yes	Yes	Yes	No	Yes	No
Koustuv Institute of Self Domain	No	No	No	Yes	Yes	No	Yes	No	No	No	Yes	No
Koustuv Institute of Technology	No	No	No	Yes	Yes	No	Yes	No	No	No	Yes	No
Krupajal Engineering College, Bhubaneswar	No	No	Yes	Yes	Yes	No	Yes	Yes	No	No	Yes	No
Kruttika Institute of Technical Education, Chandaka	No	No	No	Yes	No	Yes	No	Yes	Yes	No	Yes	No
Maharaja Institute of Technology	No	No	Yes	Yes	No	Yes	No	Yes	No	No	Yes	No
Mahavir Institute of Engineering and Technology, Bhubaneswar	No	No	Yes	Yes	Yes	No	Yes	Yes	Yes	Yes	Yes	Biomed
Majhighariani Institute of Technology and Science, Rayagada	No	No	No	Yes	Yes	Yes	No	No	No	No	Yes	Biotech
Modern Engineering & Management Studies	Yes	No	Yes	Yes	No	Yes	No	Yes	No	No	Yes	No
Modern Institute of Technology and Management, Bhubaneswar	No	No	Yes	Yes	Yes	Yes	No	Yes	No	No	Yes	No
Nalanda Institute of Technology, Bhubaneswar	No	No	Yes	Yes	No	Yes	No	Yes	No	No	Yes	No
National Institute of Science and Technology, Berhampur	Yes	No	No	Yes	Yes	Yes	No	No	No	Yes	Yes	No
Nigam Institute of Engineering & Technology	No	No	No	Yes	Yes	No	Yes	No	No	No	Yes	No
NM Institute of Engineering and Technology, Bhubaneswar	No	No	No	Yes	Yes	Yes	No	Yes	No	Yes	Yes	No
Orissa Engineering College, Bhubaneswar	No	No	Yes	Yes	No	No	Yes	Yes	No	Yes	Yes	No
Oxford College of Engineering & Management	No	No	Yes	Yes	Yes	No	Yes	Yes	No	No	Yes	No
Padmanava College of Engineering, Rourkela	No	No	Yes	Yes	Yes	No	Yes	No	No	Yes	Yes	No
Padmashree Kruthartha College of Engineering	No	No	Yes	Yes	No	No	Yes	Yes	Yes	No	Yes	No
PSIMME, Bhubaneshwar	Yes	Yes	Yes	Yes	Yes	Yes	Yes	Yes	Yes	No	Yes	No
Purushottam Institute of Engineering and Technology, Rourkela	No	No	No	Yes	Yes	No	Yes	No	Yes	Yes	Yes	No
Radhakrishna Institute of Engineering & Technology, Khurda	No	No	Yes	Yes	No	Yes	No	Yes	No	No	Yes	No
Raajdhani Engineering College, Bhubaneswar	No	No	Yes	Yes	Yes	Yes	No	No	No	Yes	Yes	No
Rayagada Institute of Technology & Management, Rayagada	No	No	Yes	No	Yes	Yes	No	No	No	No	Yes	No
Rahul Institute of Engineering & Technology	No	No	Yes	Yes	Yes	Yes	No	No	No	Yes	Yes	No
Roland Institute of Technology, Berhampur	No	No	Yes	Yes	Yes	Yes	No	No	Yes	No	Yes	No
Samanta Chandra Sekhar Institute Of Technology And Management	No	No	Yes	Yes	No	Yes	No	Yes	Yes	No	Yes	No
Sanjay Memorial Institute of Technology	No	No	Yes	Yes	Yes	No	Yes	Yes	No	No	Yes	No
Satyasai Engineering College	No	No	Yes	Yes	No	No	Yes	Yes	Yes	No	Yes	No
Seemanta Engineering College, Mayurbhanj	Yes	No	Yes	Yes	No	No	Yes	Yes	No	No	Yes	No
Shibani Institute of Technical Education	No	No	Yes	Yes	Yes	No	Yes	No	No	No	Yes	No
Silicon Institute of Technology, Bhubaneswar	No	No	No	Yes	Yes	Yes	Yes	No	Yes	Yes	No	No
Silicon Institute of Technology, Sambalpur	No	No	Yes	Yes	No	Yes	No	Yes	No	No	Yes	No
Sophitorium Engineering College	No	No	Yes	Yes	No	Yes	No	Yes	No	No	Yes	No
Spintronic Technology & Advance Research	No	No	Yes	Yes	Yes	Yes	No	No	No	No	Yes	No
Srinix College of Engineering	No	No	Yes	Yes	Yes	No	Yes	No	No	No	Yes	No
Subas Institute of Technology	No	No	Yes	Yes	Yes	No	Yes	No	No	Yes	Yes	No
Suddhananda Engineering & Research Centre	No	No	Yes	No	No	No	Yes	Yes	No	No	Yes	No
Sundergarh Engineering College, Sundergarh	No	No	No	Yes	No	Yes	No	Yes	No	No	Yes	No
Synergy Institute of Engineering & Technology, Dhenkanal	No	No	Yes	Yes	No	No	Yes	Yes	No	Yes	Yes	No
Synergy Institute of Technology,	No	No	Yes	Yes	Yes	No	No	Yes	Yes	No	Yes	No
The Techno School	No	No	Yes	Yes	Yes	Yes	No	No	Yes	No	Yes	No
Temple City Institute of Technology & Engineering, Bhubaneswar	No	No	Yes	Yes	Yes	Yes	No	Yes	No	Yes	Yes	No
Trident Academy Of Technology	No	No	No	Yes	Yes	No	Yes	Yes	No	Yes	Yes	No
Vedang Institute of Technology	No	No	No	Yes	Yes	No	Yes	No	No	No	Yes	No
VITS Engineering College	No	No	No	Yes	No	No	Yes	Yes	No	No	Yes	No
Vignan Institute of Technology and Management	No	No	No	Yes	Yes	No	Yes	No	Yes	Yes	Yes	No
Vijayanjali Institute Of Technology	No	No	Yes	Yes	Yes	No	Yes	Yes	No	No	Yes	No
Vikash College of Engineering for Women	No	No	Yes	Yes	Yes	Yes	No	No	Yes	No	Yes	No
Vivekananda Institute of Technology	No	No	Yes	Yes	Yes	No	Yes	Yes	No	No	Yes	No

=== Public private partnership colleges ===
College Name	EIE	Chem	Civil	Comp	EEE	ECE	E & TC	ELECT	AE & IE	IT	MECH	Other
International Institute of Information Technology, Bhubaneswar	No	No	No	Yes	Yes	No	Yes	No	No	Yes	No	No

== Colleges offering B.Arch ==
College Name	Type
Piloo Mody College of Architecture, Cuttack	Private
Indira Gandhi Institute of Technology, Sarang	Government

== Colleges offering MCA ==
College Name	Type	Status
Academy Of Business Administration	Private	Affiliated
Ajay Binay Institute Of Technology, Cuttack	Private	Affiliated
Balasore College Of Engineering And Technology, Balasore	Private	Affiliated
Bhadrak Institute Of Engineering & Technology, Bhadrak	Private	Affiliated
Bhubaneswar Engineering College, Bhubaneswar	Private	Affiliated
BRM Institute Of Management And Information Technology, Bhubaneswar	Private	Affiliated
C. V. Raman College of Engineering, Bhubaneshwar	Private	Affiliated
Centre for IT Education, Bhubaneswar	Government	Constituent
College of Engineering and Technology, Bhubaneswar	Government	Constituent
College Of Engineering, Bhubaneswar	Private	Affiliated
Dr. Ambedkar Memorial Institute of Information Technology and Management Science, Rourkela	Private	Affiliated
Gandhi Engineering College, Bhubaneswar	Private	Affiliated
Gandhi Institute For Technology, Bhubaneswar	Private	Affiliated
Gandhi Institute of Advanced Computer and Research	Private	Affiliated
Gandhi Institute Of Computer Studies, Gunupur	Private	Affiliated
Gandhi Institute Of Technological Advancement, Bhubaneswar	Private	Affiliated
Gayatri Institute Of Computer & Management Studies, Gunupur	Private	Affiliated
Indian Institute Of Science & Information Technology, Bhubaneswar	Private	Affiliated
Indira Gandhi Institute of Technology, Sarang	Government	Affiliated
Indus College Of Engineering, Bhubaneswar	Private	Affiliated
Institute of Management and Information Technology, Cuttack	Government	Constituent
Institute Of Professional Studies & Research, Cuttack	Private	Affiliated
Institute Of Technical Education & Research, Bhubaneswar	Private	Affiliated
Koustuv Institute Of Self Domain, Bhubaneswar	Private	Affiliated
Kushagra Institute Of Information & Management Science, Cuttack	Private	Affiliated
Mahavir Institute Of Engineering Technology, Bhubaneswar	Private	Affiliated
Nalanda Institute Of Technology, Bhubaneswar	Private	Affiliated
National Institute of Science and Technology, Berhampur	Private	Affiliated
Niis Institute Of Business Administration	Private	Affiliated
Nm Institute Of Engineering & Technology, Bhubaneswar	Private	Affiliated
Orissa Computer Academy, Bhubaneswar	Private	Affiliated
P J College Of Management & Technology, Bhubaneswar	Private	Affiliated
Purushottam Institute Of Engineering And Technology, Rourkela	Private	Affiliated
Rajdhani Engineering College, Bhubaneswar	Private	Affiliated
Regional College of Management, Bhubaneswar	Private	Affiliated
Roland Institute Of Technology, Berhampur	Private	Affiliated
Rourkela Institute of Management Studies, Rourkela	Private	Affiliated
Rourkela Institute Of Technology, Rourkela	Private	Affiliated
Seemanta Engineering College, Jharpokharia	Private	Affiliated
Silicon Institute Of Technology, Bhubaneswar	Private	Affiliated
Srusti Academyof Management, Bhubaneswar	Private	Affiliated
The Techno School, Bhubaneswar	Private	Affiliated
Trident Academy Of Creative Technology, Bhubaneswar	Private	Affiliated
United School Of Business Management	Private	Affiliated

== Colleges offering MBA ==
College Name	Type	Status
Academy Of Management & Information Technology	Private	Affiliated
Academy Of Management Studies, Bhubaneswar	Private	Affiliated
Ajay Binay Institute Of Technology, Cuttack	Private	Affiliated
Apex Institute Of Technology & Management, Pahala	Private	Affiliated
Astha School Of Management	Private	Affiliated
Balasore College Of Engineering And Technology, Balasore	Private	Affiliated
Bhubaneswar Inst. Of Mgmt. & Information Technology, Bhubaneswar	Private	Affiliated
Biju Patnaik Inst. Of Information Tech. And Mgmt., Bhubaneswar	Private	Affiliated
College of IT and Management Education, Bhubaneswar	Government	Constituent
Professional Studies & Research, Cuttack	Private	Affiliated
Kalam Institute Of Technology, Berhampur	Private	Affiliated
Konark Institute Of Science & Technology, Bhubaneswar	Private	Affiliated
Koustav Institute Of Technology, Bhubaneswar	Private	Affiliated
Koustuv Institute Of Self Domain, Bhubaneswar	Private	Affiliated
Kushagra Institute Of Information & Management Science, Cuttack	Private	Affiliated
Madhusudan Institute Of Co-Operative Management, Bhubaneswar	Government	Affiliated
Mahavir Institute Of Engineering Technology, Bhubaneswar	Private	Affiliated
Modern Engineering & Management Studies, Balasore	Private	Affiliated
Modern Institute Of Technology & Management, Bhubaneswar	Private	Affiliated
National Institute Of Science & Technology, Berhampur	Private	Affiliated
NIIS Institute Of Business Administration	Private	Affiliated
NIIST International Institute Of Management	Private	Affiliated
NM Institute Of Engineering & Technology, Bhubaneswar	Private	Affiliated
P J College Of Management & Technology, Bhubaneswar	Private	Affiliated
Post Graduate Centre For Management Studies, Berhampur	Private	Affiliated
PSIMME, Bhubaneshwar	Private	Affiliated
Purushottam Institute Of Engineering And Technology, Rourkela	Private	Affiliated
Rajdhani College Of Engineering & Management, Bhubaneswar	Private	Affiliated
Rajdhani Engineering College, Bhubaneswar	Private	Affiliated
Regional College of Management, Bhubaneswar	Private	Affiliated
Rj School Of Management Studies, Balasore	Private	Affiliated
Rourkela Institute of Management Studies, Rourkela	Private	Affiliated
Rourkela Institute Of Technology, Rourkela	Private	Affiliated
Saraswat Institute Of Management, Bhubaneswar	Private	Affiliated
Srusti Academyof Management, Bhubaneswar	Private	Affiliated
Suddhananda School Of Management & Computer Science	Private	Affiliated
The Techno School, Bhubaneswar	Private	Affiliated
Trident Academy Of Creative Technology, Bhubaneswar	Private	Affiliated
Trident Academy Of Technology, Bhubaneswar	Private	Affiliated
United School Of Business Management	Private	Affiliated
Vignan Institute Of Technology & Management, Berhampur	Private	Affiliated
Satyananda Institute Of Management And Information Technology	Private	Affiliated
Gandhi Institute of Advance Computer and Research	Private	Affiliated
S. M. Institute of Technology, Post Graduate Centre for Management Studies, Berhampur	Private	Affiliated
