= Brahmapur, Odisha =

Silk city of Odisha, India

Brahmapur Berhampur
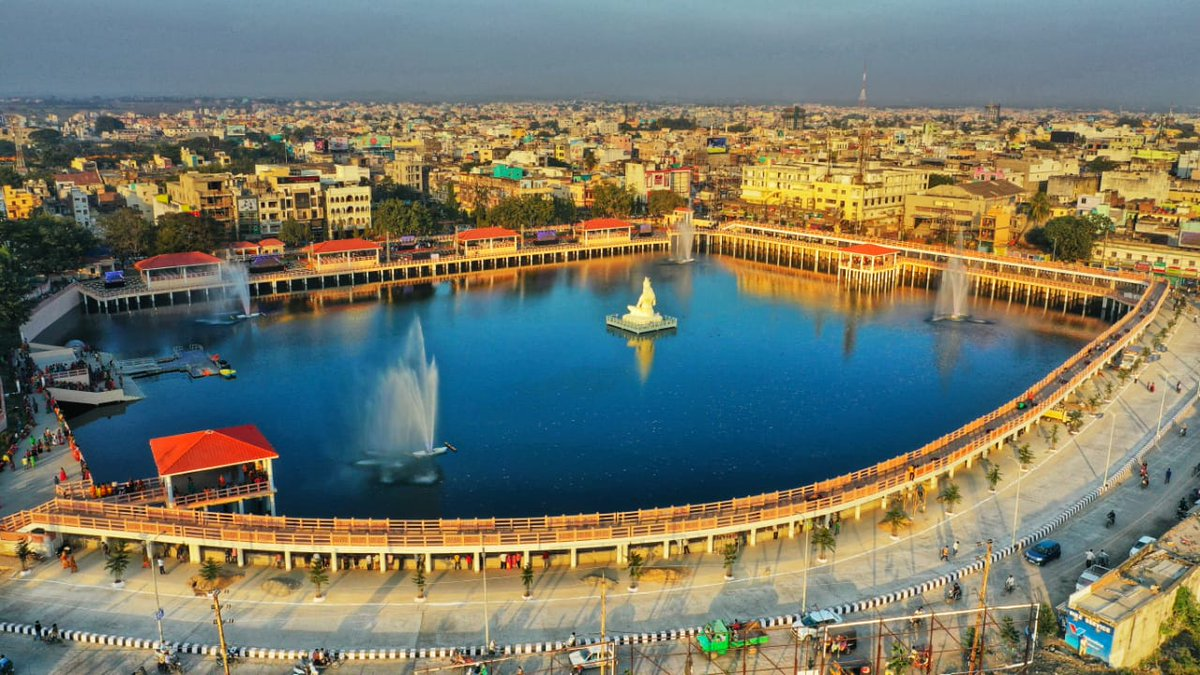
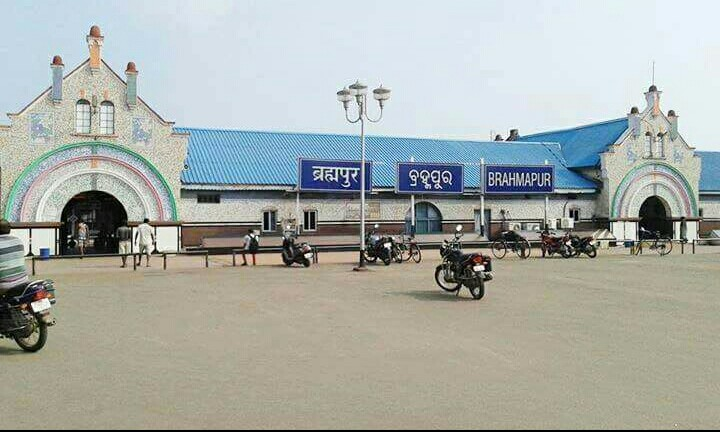
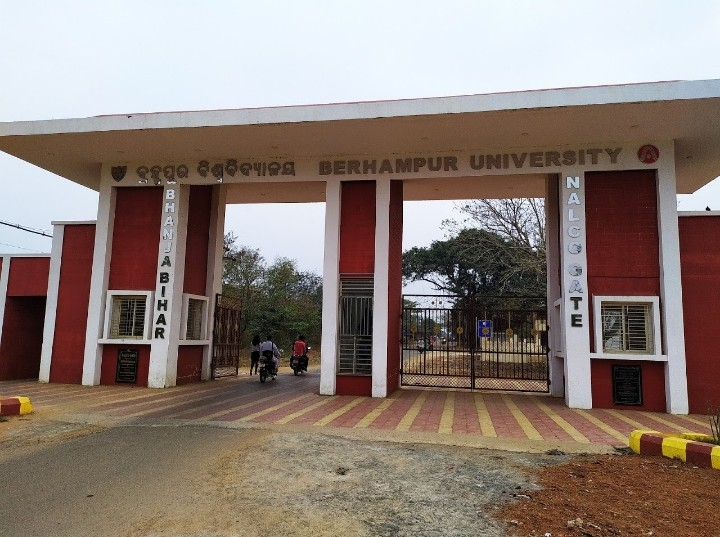
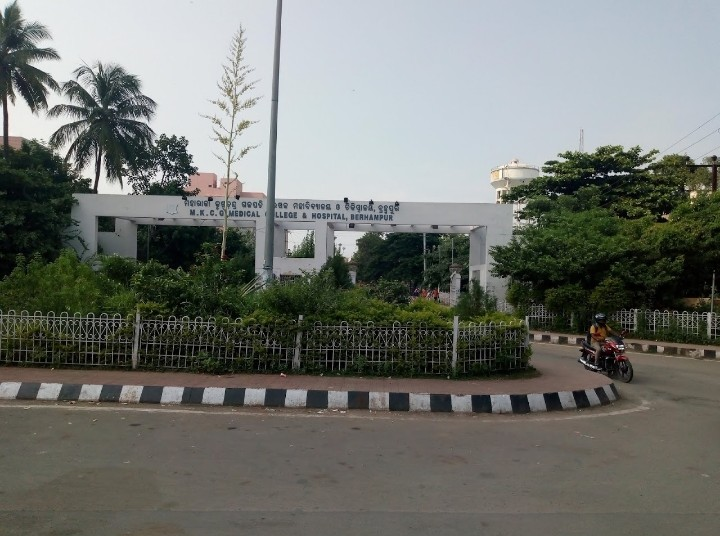
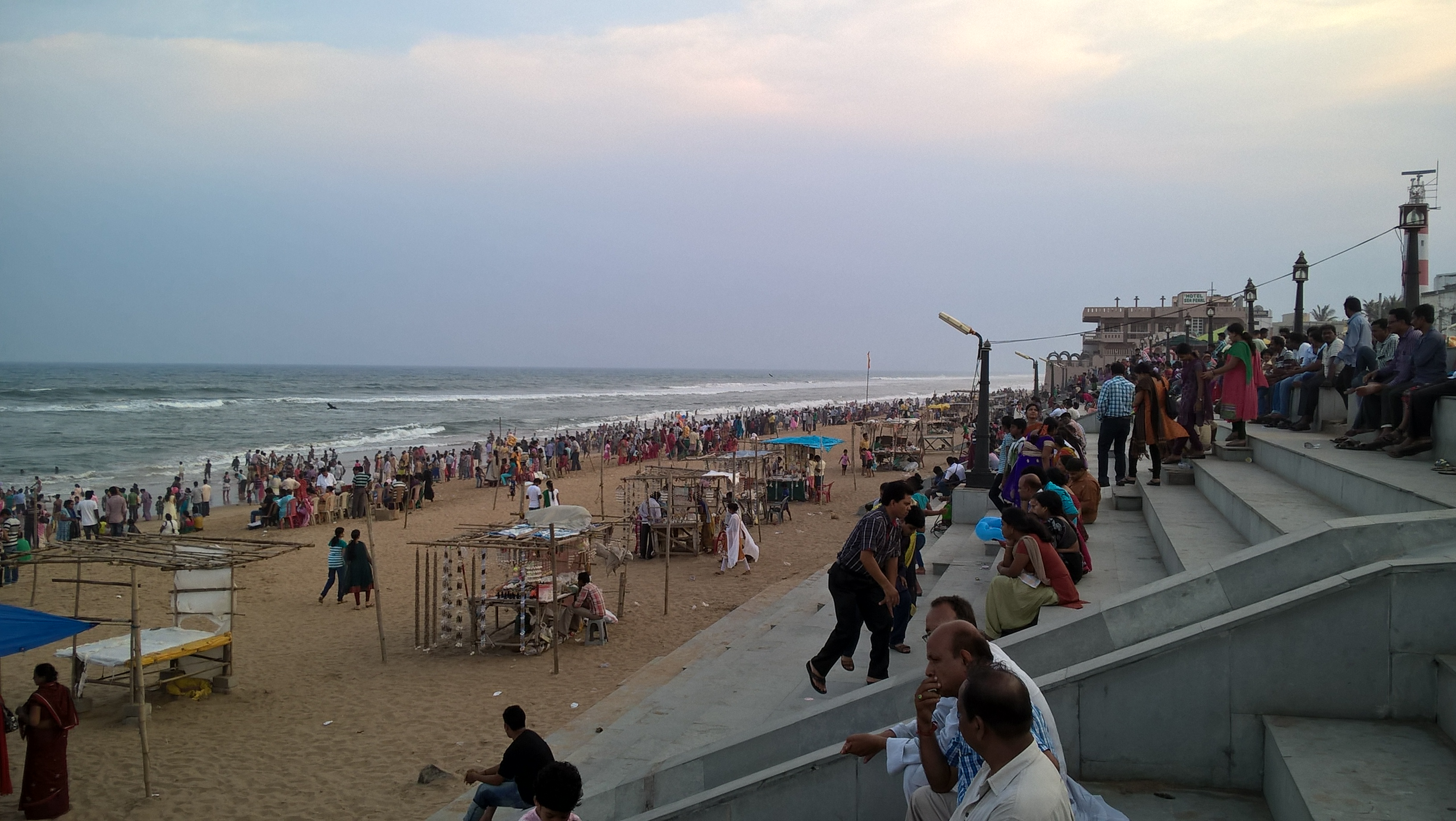
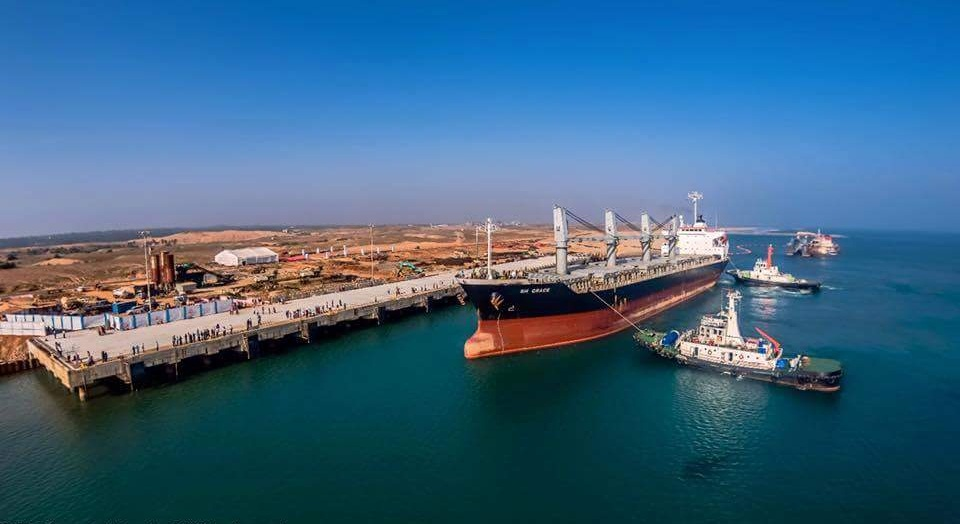
- From top; left to right: Ramalingeswar Park, Brahmapur Railway Station, IISER Berhampur, Berhampur University, MKCG Medical College, Gopalpur Sea Beach and Gopalpur Port
- Nickname: Silk city
- Location in Odisha, India Location in India
- Coordinates: 19.3150°N 84.7941°E
- Country: India
- State: Odisha
- District: Ganjam
- First settled: 1672
- Named for: Lord Brahmeshwara

Government
  - Type: Municipal Corporation
  - Body: Brahmapur Municipal Corporation (BeMC)
  - Mayor: Smt. Sanghamitra Dalei
  - Municipal Commissioner: Shri Prathamesh Arvind Rajeshirke,IAS
  - SP, Brahmapur Police District: Saravana Vivek M, IPS
  - Member of Parliament: Pradeep Kumar Panigrahy (BJP)
  - Member of Legislative Assembly: K. Anil Kumar (BJP)

Area
  - Total: 116 km^{2} (45 sq mi)
- Elevation: 24 m (79 ft)

Population (2011)
  - Total: 355,823
  - Density: 3,070/km^{2} (7,940/sq mi)
- Demonym(s): Brahmapuria; Bar(h)ampuria; Berhampuria; Brahmapuri

Languages
  - Official: Odia (official); Telugu
- Time zone: UTC+5:30 (IST)
- PIN: 760001–760010
- Telephone code: 0680
- Vehicle registration: OR-07 (old); OD-07
- Website: www.bdabrahmapur.in www.berhampur.gov.in

Brahmapur (Odia pronunciation: [bɾɔh.mɔ.puɾ]), also known as Berhampur, is a city on the eastern coastline of Odisha, India, famously known as the Silk City of Odisha. It ranks as the 4th most populous city of Odisha. Brahmapur is also called the food capital of Odisha.

== Etymology ==
The name of the city is said to have been derived from the name of Brahmeshwara, a deity in Hinduism, worshipped in a temple at Lathi 4 km from the main city.

== History ==
=== Ancient and medieval period ===
Brahmapur, along with regions of southern Odisha, was a core part of the ancient Kalinga empire. Jaugada, also known as Samapa, 35 km away from Brahmapur on the banks of the Rushikulya, was an ancient fort and city existing from at least the 3rd century BC to 7th century AD. After the Kalinga War Samapa turned into a provincial headquarter of the Maurya Empire (along with Dhauli) as evident from the edicts found at both places. Specific history about the place and civilisation does not exist after the Maurya rule and the fort is now buried. As per Ain-i-Akbari, this region used to be called Kalinga Dandapat which was an administrative division of the Odishan empire under the Eastern Ganga dynasty and later the Gajapati dynasty.

Brahmapur is also known as the Silk City for its famous Berhampur Patta (silk) sarees. The chief of the Dera community, Kota Chandramani Kubera Senapati, led his community people to migrate to Mohuri (Brahmapur) who settled down into their hereditary profession of weaving tussar silken products or Patta Matha. They migrated to the city from Rajahmundry (where they were known as Devangas) sometime during 1662-1672 on the request of the then Raja Harihar Narayan Deo of Mohuri zamindari. The festival of Buddhi Thakurani Yatra originated here along with the emergence of the weaver community. They started the Ghata Yatra (Pot Festival) for the purpose of highlighting the tradition of worshiping the Goddesses as well as to use it as a platform for sales promotion of their silken products.

=== Period of British Rule ===
The Ganjam Garhjat area consisted of 22 zamindaris of various royal lineages. The French invaded Ganjam in 1759 (in the battle of Deccan) and quit in 1763. The British then imposed their authority over southern Odisha in 1766 and placed the whole region under the Madras Presidency. The district headquarters of Ganjam district started functioning in 1768 from Potagarh. An epidemic broke out in 1815 and that forced the authorities to shift the headquarters to Brahmapur, including the civil and military personnels. Brahmapur was the capital and residence of the Mohuri (Mahuri) zamindar. However, the Ganjam collectorate could not continue for long and shifted to Chhatrapur in 1831 due to stiff resistance here. After the auction and abolishing the Ghumusar and Sorada zamindari in 1836, Britishers auctioned Mohuri zamindari in 1850 over non payment of tax dues and introduced the Ryotwari system of tax collection, which led to Raja Krushna Chandra Narendra Deo losing power. The value of Mohuri at that time, which was a leading zamindari, was valued at ₹50 lakh but no Indian dared to come forward to bid for it. So, it was auctioned for only ₹100. Britishers were stationed at Bhapur area at the centre of Brahmapur. They built military lines, a military hospital, a magazine house, and a parade ground for sepoys there. Subsequently, Brahmapur was formed into a Ta'lluq and was kept under a senior assistant collector. The present Revenue Divisional Commissioner (RDC) residence was his residence. In 1867, Brahmapur was declared a Municipality area and thus a part of Madras Presidency, which attracted a further influx of settlers from the south because of better engagement in business sectors. The bilingualism (Odia and Telugu) prevails since that time. The Brahmapur railway station started functioning by 1900. This had profound effects in the transportation system and mobility of passengers. The population in 1901 was 25,729, which increased to 62,343 by 1951 as per census report. The colonial town generated a considerable amount of interest among Indian scholars who linked the important issues of modernity, national aspirations, notions of citizenship, and the creation of new artistic sensibilities. The city is also known for its love for the theatre and cinema. The Ganjam Kala Parishad and Prakasam Hall are two of the oldest theatre halls in the country. The Sri Sitaram Vilas Talkies was the oldest movie hall in Odisha, which was established in 1927 but closed down after the devastating 1999 Odisha cyclone.

=== Role in Orissa Province formation ===
Brahmapur was where Odias assembled and started their agitations more than three decades prior to demanding introduction of Odia as a subject in the Madras University and recognition of Odia language in courts and government offices of Ganjam. This paved the path for the public grievances. In 1903 at the First Utkal Union Conference at Cuttack, Raghava Rao from Brahmapur moved a resolution which called separation of the district of Ganjam, Ganjam Hill Tracts Agency and Vizagapatam Hill Tracts Agency from Madras Presidency. Subsequently, an annual conference of the Ganjam Jatiya Samiti (Ganjam National Conference) was held in 11 & 12 April 1903 at Brahmapur. It saw the participation of some leaders from Odisha like Madhusudan Das, Gopabandhu Das, Radhanath Ray, Nanda Kishore Bal and Fakir Mohan Senapati. After continuous efforts the undivided Sambalpur district was transferred to Orissa division from Central Provinces and Berar on 1 September 1905. Although the long standing claims of Odias of Ganjam was ignored. On 1912, Bihar and Orissa Province formed without Ganjam district and Vizagapatnam Agency. Although Telugus opposed the amalgamation of Brahmapur, the leaders of the Andhra Movement advocated that, provinces were to be created on a linguistic basis. Some Telugus like Dr. B.Pattabhisitarameya, a nationalist, proposed to include Odia regions of Ganjam and Vizagapatnam to merge with Orissa. N. Subha Rao, a Telugu member of the Imperial Legislative Council pleaded for the same with some compensatory gain. Sri Rama Rayanger, a member of Council of Governor-General of India strongly supported the amalgamation. He presided over a meeting at Brahmapur where both Odias and Telugus attended and he said that both groups suffered under the Madras government. From 1920 to 1936, the Odia Movement became more active and vigorous after British administration ignored the demands of the Odias in their Government of India Act 1919. Prominent leaders of Odisha repeatedly put the amalgamation question in the Provincial Legislative Councils, the Imperial Legislative Council and even in the British Parliament. Mahatma Gandhi when he visited Brahmapur on 29 March 1921 appealed to the non-Odias to yield to the demand of Odisha amalgamation. When he returned he wrote an article supporting the demands of Odias in Young India. In 1928 when the Simon Commission visited India, Krushna Chandra Gajapati, the Maharaja of Paralakhemundi Estate and Bhubaneswar Rath of Brahmapur appeared before the commission at Madras and presented memorandum claiming merger. The commission recommended the merger on the basis of linguistic pattern and appoint a sub-committee, to conduct detailed investigation. The report of the Simon Commission led to the summoning of the Round Table Conference in London in 1930. The Maharaja of Paralakhemundi, leading an Odia delegate to the conference circulated a pamphlet, The Oriyas, their need and reasons for separate state. The Government of India appointed a boundary commission for Orissa with S.P. O'Oonell as Chairman whose report was opposed by Odias as it only recommended the inclusion of the plains and the agency of Ganjam and excluded areas like Paralakhemundi, Manjusa, Tekkali, Tarla etc. Odia speaking people in and around Brahmapur town tried their best to justify the linguistic affinity and socio-cultural attachment with the Odias of Odisha and Odia speaking people outside Odisha. They argued how under non-Odia census officers, the population of Odias decreased from census to census. People realised Brahmapur could become a noble point in the growth of socio-political consciousness and that territorial dismemberment of Odia speaking areas was the reason for backwardness under British rule. On 25 March 1933, Sashibhusan Rath led an Odia delegation to the Collector of Ganjam. Similarly at many places in and around Brahmapur protest meetings were organized demanding the merger of Paralakhemundi in Orissa. The Maharaja of Paralakhemundi again went to London to give evidence before the Joint Select Committee and after strenuous efforts he was able to include the Odia majority portion of Paralakhemundi Estate along with its town and Jeypore Estate in the new province of Orissa. In line with the recommendation of the Joint Select Committee, the Government of India Act of 1935 was passed by the British Parliament and the Orissa Province was formed in 1 April 1936.

== Geography ==
=== Location and Topography ===
Located on Odisha's east coast, Berhampur is marked by coastal plains that descend into the Bay of Bengal. The average elevation of the city is approximately 34 meters above sea level. The region's diverse terrain is influenced by the range of granite hillocks that border it to the north and west. It reflects the varied topography with a combination of interior and coastal plants. Although fertile red lateritic and alluvial soils may be found across the region, Berhampur's soil is primarily clayey. These soil types are very favorable to agriculture, producing crops like rice, legumes, and a variety of vegetables, thanks to the tropical climate and significant rainfall during the monsoon season, which lasts from July to October.

=== Climate ===
Maximum summer temperature is 40 °C; minimum winter temperature is 22 °C. The mean daily maximum temperature varies from 27 °C to 32 °C. May is the hottest month; January is the coldest. The average annual rainfall is 1190 mm and the region receives monsoon and torrential rainfall from July to October.

Climate data for Berhampur, Odisha
Month	Jan	Feb	Mar	Apr	May	Jun	Jul	Aug	Sep	Oct	Nov	Dec	Year
Mean daily maximum °C (°F)	27.4 (81.3)	29.1 (84.4)	30.9 (87.6)	31.7 (89.1)	32.8 (91.0)	32.5 (90.5)	30.8 (87.4)	31.0 (87.8)	31.5 (88.7)	31.0 (87.8)	29.2 (84.6)	27.5 (81.5)	30.5 (86.8)
Mean daily minimum °C (°F)	16.7 (62.1)	19.3 (66.7)	22.4 (72.3)	25.1 (77.2)	26.8 (80.2)	26.8 (80.2)	25.9 (78.6)	25.9 (78.6)	25.7 (78.3)	23.7 (74.7)	19.3 (66.7)	16.5 (61.7)	22.8 (73.1)
Average rainfall mm (inches)	10 (0.4)	16 (0.6)	21 (0.8)	17 (0.7)	42 (1.7)	151 (5.9)	208 (8.2)	227 (8.9)	193 (7.6)	232 (9.1)	68 (2.7)	5 (0.2)	1,190 (46.8)
Source: en.climate-data.org

== Administration ==
The city is administered by the Brahmapur Municipal Corporation (BeMC). The city used to be the first municipality which was formed in 1867, and was upgraded to a municipal corporation on 29 December 2008. The Municipal body completed its 150 years in 2017. The Odisha Municipal Corporation Act of 2003 established the Berhampur Municipal Corporation's general powers and statutory duties. There are 42 wards under the Corporation. Ms. A. Sasya Reddy, IAS is the Commissioner and Sri Ashirvad parida, OAS and Kalyani Sanghamitra Devi, OAS are the Deputy Commissioners. The Berhampur Municipal Corporation looks after the following services: payment of holding taxes, issuance of birth/death certificate, application for marriage certificate, trade license, RTI application and town hall/mandap booking.

The Revenue Divisional Commissioner (RDC) of Southern range is located in Brahmapur and covers the undivided Ganjam, Koraput, Kandhamal, and Kalahandi districts.

The headquarters for Brahmapur Tahasil, District Education Office (Ganjam), Brahmapur Police District and Brahmapur Sub-Division are also situated here.

== Demographics ==
Historical population
Year	Pop.	±%
1872	21,670	—
1881	23,599	+8.9%
1891	25,653	+8.7%
1901	25,729	+0.3%
1911	31,456	+22.3%
1921	32,731	+4.1%
1931	37,750	+15.3%
1941	43,536	+15.3%
1951	62,343	+43.2%
1961	76,931	+23.4%
1971	117,662	+52.9%
1981	162,550	+38.1%
1991	210,418	+29.4%
2001	307,792	+46.3%
2011	355,823	+15.6%
Source: Census of India

Literacy rates in Berhampur
Male	93.83%
Female	85.92%
Total	90.04%

Religions in Brahmapur City (2011)
Religion	Percent
Hinduism	96.48%
Islam	2.03%
Christianity	1.18%
Other or not stated	0.31%

As of 2011 Census of India (provisional), the population of Brahmapur was 355,823, of which 185,584 were males and 170,239 were females making it the fourth most populous urban city in Odisha state and 126th in India.

The effective literacy rate of Brahmapur was 90.04 %, higher than the national average of 74.04 %. Male and female literacy rates were 93.83 % and 85.92 %, respectively. 8.2 % of the population were children ages 0–6 years. The adult and child sex ratios were 917 and 898 females per 1000 males, respectively.

As of 2021 Census of India (provisional), the population of Brahmapur was 356,598, of which 185,754 were males and 170,844 were females making it the fourth most populous urban city in Odisha state and 126th in India.

== Economy ==
Known as "The Silk City," Berhampur has long been the main commercial center of southern Odisha. Its economy is based on a combination of traditional craft, commerce, and gradual industrial expansion. Along with other regional specialties including brass and bell-metal goods, wood carvings, horn toys, carpets, and bamboo-straw handicrafts, the city is most famous for its handwoven silk sarees or Brahmapuri Patta' which is registered under the GI Act by the Government of India. It has also developed into a significant commercial hub for tamarind, textiles, and spices because to its proximity to the coast. Over 50 sheds involved in engineering, fabrication, electrical equipment, medicines, tarpaulin, wire nails, polythene, wheat mills, ice plants, etc. are located in Berhampur's approximately 30-acre industrial area. The city now has two industrial growth hubs that support the expansion of the automotive industry: Haladiapadar and Aska Road. Indian Rare Earths Ltd. operates 20 kilometers away from the city. The city of Berhmapur has over 750 small-scale industrial facilities. Food, electrical and electronics, medicines, engineering, plastic, cement goods, maintenance and servicing-based sectors, etc. are some of the categories into which these industries have been divided. The city has a constant popularity as a religious and shopping destination among tourists. IT and BPO companies have been set up which are providing many opportunities. The third Software Park, which is the STPI of Odisha is under development in Ambapua. These have brought a contemporary dimension to the city's economy in recent years.

Languages spoken in Brahmapur M Corp (2011)
1. Odia (83.99%)
2. Telugu (12.79%)
3. Urdu (1.53%)
4. Hindi (0.90%)
5. Others (0.79%)

== Transportation ==
=== Road ===
Brahmapur city is connected with National Highways NH-16 (Chennai–Kolkata), NH-59 (Brahmapur-Khariar), NH-516 (Narendrapur-Gopalpur), State Highway 17 (Odisha) and State Highway 22 (Odisha) which connect almost all other cities and towns of Odisha.

Three-wheeler auto taxis are the most important mode of transportation in this city, with Taxis also on the city's roads. Online "C-cabs" and "Ola" taxi-service app is also available. The state government has constructed a new bus station at Haladiapadar, at the outskirts of the city. The Ganjam Urban Transport Services Limited (GUTSL) with joint partnership with Odisha State Road Transport Corporation (OSRTC) have an agreement to run a city-bus service for Brahmapur to urban centres on its periphery (Chatrapur, Gopalpur and Hinjili, Taratarini, Bhairabi) since 27 February 2014.

=== Rail ===
Brahmapur is served by its own Brahmapur railway station under the Khurda Road division of East Coast Railway, and is situated in the Howrah-Chennai main line.

=== Air ===
The city has an airport at Rangeilunda. The airstrip was in use during British Raj and World War II. However, post independence, it has lied in a dilapidated condition with no scope of expansion due to its adjacence to Berhampur University. Demands for a new greenfield airport have been echoing throughout the years but have remained futile due to government inaction.

In 2018, the airport was selected for developing it into a commercial airport by the government's UDAN scheme. In view of this, in March 2023, it started commercial operations to Bhubaneswar, with flights operated twice a week.

=== Sea ===
The Gopalpur port was recommissioned after renovation and expansion.

== Educational institutions ==
- Berhampur University
- IISER Berhampur
- Khallikote Unitary University
- Maharaja Krushna Chandra Gajapati Medical College and Hospital
- Parala Maharaja Engineering College
- Roland Institute of Technology
- Uma Charan Patnaik Engineering School
- Vignan Institute of Technology and Management

== Culture ==
Brahmapur is famous for its food, markets and also known as the food capital of Odisha.

The most famous markets are Annapurna Market, Bada Bazaar, Sano Bazaar, Bhapur Bazaar, Giri Market, Hanuman Market, Ganesh Market, and Sai Complex. The mango market of Brahmapur is one of the largest wholesale mango markets in India. The Balunkeswara Bana Market here is one of the largest in the state.

=== Arts ===
Brahmapur has been an important site of the state's culture due to its unique Odia culture and has held several national level Odia and Telugu literary meets.

Sri Sitaram Vilas Talkies (SSVT) was the first cinema theatre in Odisha.

There has been a critical lack of museums. The open air Scrap Museum near ITI is one of the largest in India.

=== Festivals ===
The Thakurani Jatra(biennial) is the most important festival in the city and is one of the state festivals of Odisha. The cult of Buddhi Thakurani originated along with the emergence of Brahmapur town in and around 1672 AD. The Ghata Yatra was initiated for the purpose of highlighting the tradition of worshiping Thakurani as well as to use it as a platform for sales promotion of silken products.

The date for Thakurani Yatra was fixed by the yatra management committee at the house of Desi Behera, Chief of the Dera community. Buddhi Thakurani is considered as the daughter of the Desi Behera and the deity stays with her father's family during the entire Yatra period.

== Politics ==
Brahmapur is under the jurisdiction of Berhampur (Lok Sabha constituency). The part of Berhampur Assembly Constituency and Gopalpur Assembly Constituency spread over the city.

== Places of interest ==
There are many places to see in and around Brahmapur which can be interesting for tourists.

- Gopalpur Beach
- Budhi Thakurani Temple
- Tampara Lake
- Dhabaleshwar Beach
- Mahuri Kalua Temple
- Ghodahada Dam
- Potagada Fort
- Hillpatna Ganesh Temple
- Haripur Beach
- Sunapur Beach
- Balakumari Temple
- Markandi Beach
- Panchama Temple
- Bhairabi Temple
- Tara Tarini Temple
- Syamalai Temple
- Jaugada Fort
- Pantha Nivas
- Khambeswari Temple
- Soroda Ghai
- Ujjaleswar Mahadeva
- Nirmaljhar
- Taptapani
- Kalijai
- Beleswar Mahadev
- Biranchi Narayan Temple
- Budhakhola
- Karanjei
- Sarana Srikhetra (Marada Jagannath Temple)
- Bhanjanagar Park (Biju Pattnaik Park)
- Baghalati Dam
- Bateswara Temple
- Arryapalli Beach

== Notable people ==
- Binayak Acharya, former Chief Minister of Odisha
- V. V. Giri, former President of India
- Kota Harinarayana, scientist, former Programme Director and Chief Designer of India's Light Combat Aircraft Tejas programme
- Celina Jaitly, actress and model, studied at Khallikote College
- Madhu Sudan Kanungo, scientist, academician and teacher
- Ravi Kumar Katulu, won gold in weightlifting at 2010 Commonwealth Games and also participated in 2012 London Olympics.
- Lisa Mishra, American singer and actress
- Sisir Mishra, film director (Hindi, Odia)
- Sidhant Mohapatra, actor and politician.
- Lingaraj Panigrahi, former Chief Justice of Orissa High Court and politician
- Sanjukta Panigrahi, Odissi dancer
- Sulagna Panigrahi, actress
- Arun K. Pati, quantum physicist
- A. P. Patro, Minister of Public Works and Education (Madras Presidency) (1921–1926)
- W. V. V. B. Ramalingam, mathematics teacher and freedom fighter
- Waheeda Rehman, actress and dancer started her career at Ganjam Kala Parishad, Berhampur.
- Anchal Sahu, television actress
