= Silicon University =

Private Technical Research University in Odisha, India

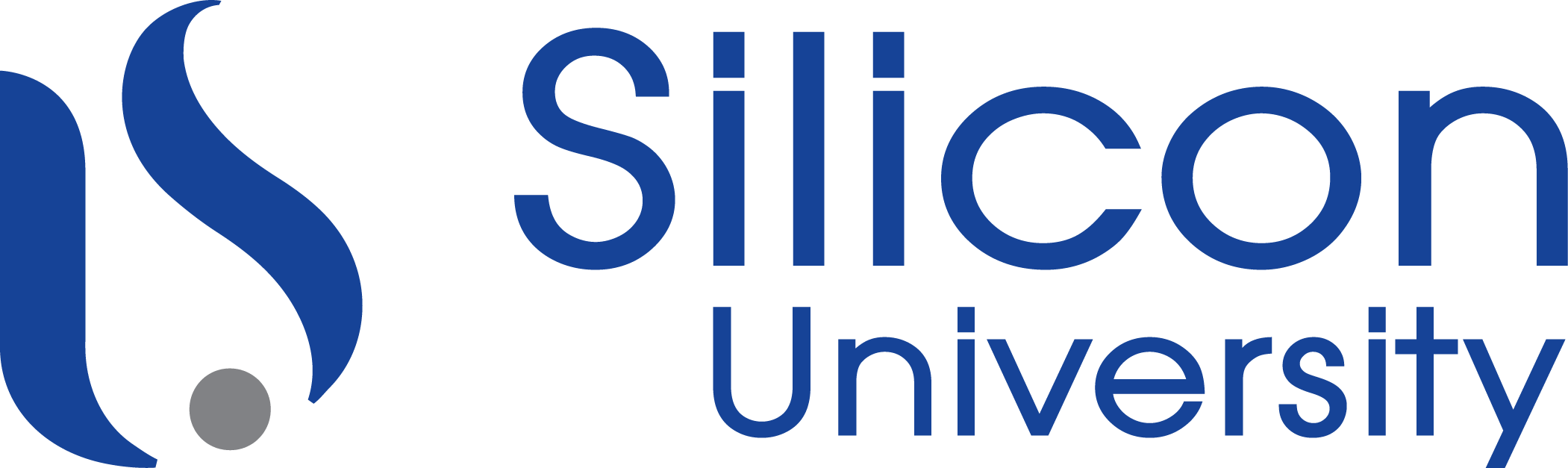
- Type: Private technical university
- Established: 2001
- Affiliations: NAAC, NBA
- Chairman: Er. N.C Dhall & Er.Sanjeev Nayak
- Director: Prof (Dr.) Jaideep Talukdar
- Location: Bhubaneswar and Sambalpur, Odisha, India; 20.3513°N 85.8054°E
- Website: www.silicon.ac.in

Silicon University is a private technical research university situated in Bhubaneswar, the capital of Odisha, India.

== Overview ==
It was established as Silicon Institute of Technology in 2001 as an affiliated college of Utkal University and later became affiliated with Biju Patnaik University of Technology until 2024. Admission to Silicon University is based on the Joint Entrance Examination (main) merit list of the Government of India. Accredited by the National Board of Accreditation, the university was granted autonomy by the University Grants Commission (UGC) in 2017 for a decade. Its sister institution, Silicon Institute of Technology, Sambalpur, was founded in 2009. Silicon Institute of Technology, Bhubaneswar, transitioned to Silicon University, Odisha, effective from January 31, 2024.

Since its inception, the institution has operated from its permanent campus at Silicon Hills, Patia in Bhubaneswar and at Silicon West, Sason, Sambalpur. Both locations have campuses with more than 2,000 students, about 2,000 alumni and 450 staff members.

The institution has a think tank comprising academics, educational entrepreneurs, industry personnel and educationists.

== Rankings ==
University rankings

Engineering – India
- NIRF (2024): 201-300

The National Institutional Ranking Framework (NIRF) ranked the institute in the 201-300 band in the engineering rankings in 2024.

== Gallery ==
Basketball ground at Silicon Institute of Technology, Bhubaneswar.
