= Orissa Engineering College =

Engineering college in Odisha, India

Coordinates: 20.164386°N 85.771696°E

Orissa Engineering College, Bhubaneswar
- Motto: Stands for Quality Education
- Type: Private
- Established: 1986 (36 Years ago)
- Affiliations: Biju Patnaik University of Technology; All India Council for Technical Education; National Assessment and Accreditation Council; National Board of Accreditation
- Chairman: Late Kamini Kanta Patnaik
- President: Mrs. Subhra Patnaik
- Principal: Er. Priyabrata Sahoo (2020- Present)
- Director: Mrs. Suprita Pattnaik
- Undergraduates: 27000
- Location: Bhubaneswar, Odisha, India
- Campus: 58 acres Urban
- Website: https://www.oec.ac.in/

Orissa Engineering College, Bhubaneswar is a First private engineering college established in Odisha. It was set up in 1986. Orissa Engineering College is the Odisha Electronics Control Library result of the vision of Shri Kamini Kanta Patnaik. It was inaugurated by the then chief minister of Orissa J B Patnaik. The college has alumni all across the world. The institute provides courses in B.Tech, M.Tech and MBA. The college is affiliated to Biju Patnaik University of Technology and has been approved by AICTE. The college has received NBA for three departments; Electronics and Telecommunication Engineering, Mechanical Engineering and Electrical Engineering

== Academic Structure ==
The college offers four-year B.Tech degree in six engineering disciplines and a two-year M.Tech degree in a few disciplines. Its management school Center for Management Studies offers a two-year full-time MBA degree affiliated to Biju Patnaik University of Technology, the technical university of the state of Orissa.

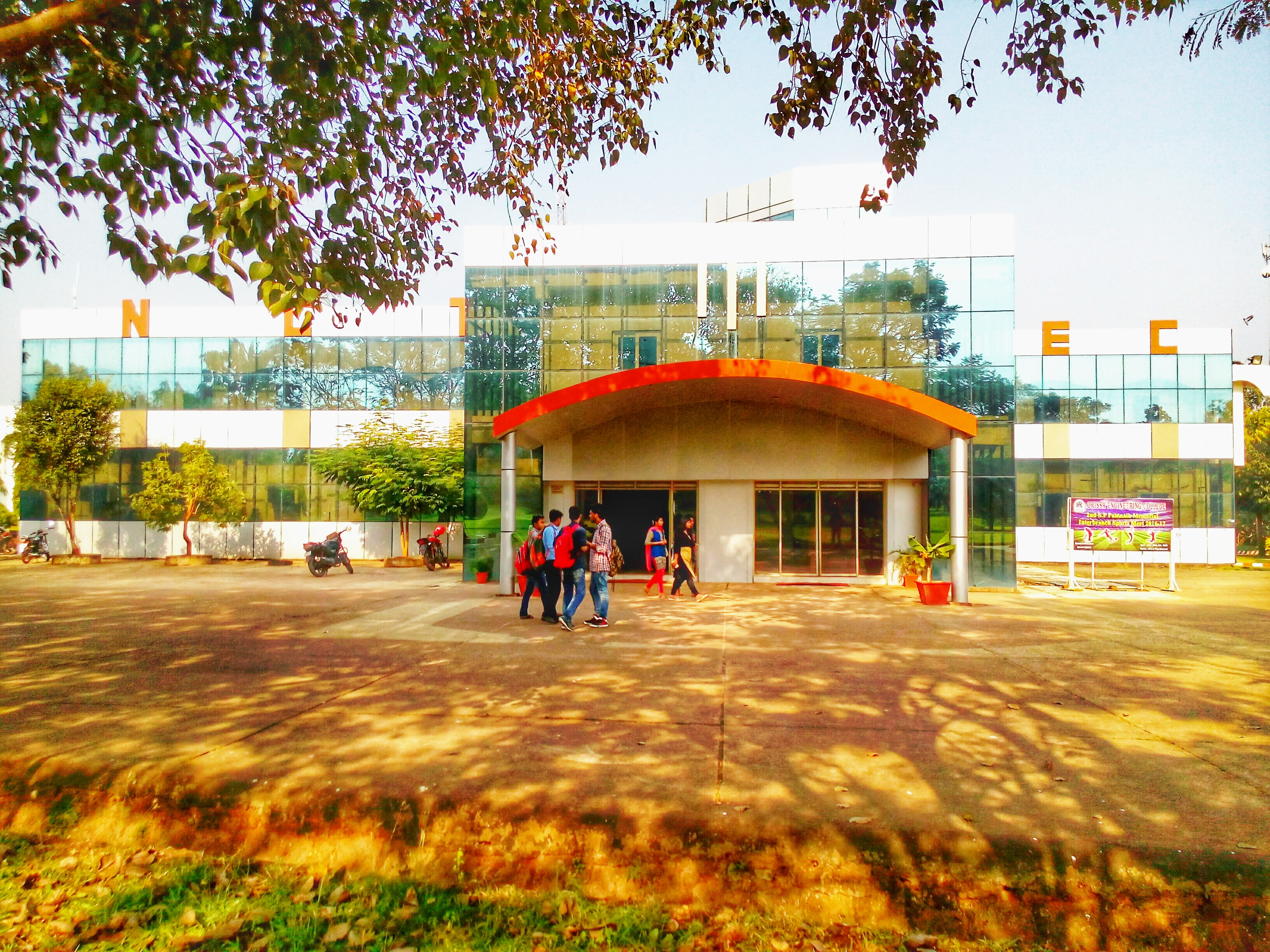
A View of Main Building of Orissa Engineering College, Bhubaneswar

=== Courses Offered ===
- Computer Science and Engineering
- Information Technology
- Electronics and Telecommunication Engineering
- Electrical Engineering
- Mechanical Engineering
- Civil Engineering

== Academic departments ==
=== Computer Science and Engineering ===
The department was started with an intake capacity of 60 Students. From 1994 onwards the intake was increased to 90 students and later on after 2010 again increased to 120 students. The students are guided by two professors, four assistant professors, and 14 full-time lecturers.

- There are over 20,000 square feet (2,000 m^{2}) lecture halls, audio–visual rooms, faculty rooms and laboratories.
- Air–conditioned and well furnished programming labs equipped with latest versions of software like Oracle, Java, VB, C++, under Unix, Windows, Linux environment.
- Internet facility with 1Mb it/s leased line for the Internet lab.

==== Laboratories ====
- Database Lab
- Project Lab
- Operating System Lab
- System Programming Lab
- Networking Lab
- Computer Center

=== Information Technology ===
The department has merged into Computer Science and Engineering branch.

=== Electronics and Telecommunication Engineering ===
The department has an intake capacity of 120 students. The students are guided by one professor, one assistant professor and 11 full-time lecturers.

=== Electrical Engineering ===
The department can accommodate 120 students per batch. The students are guided by one professor, three assistant professors and 16 full-time lecturers.

It has computing facilities, power electronics laboratory, laboratories for electrical machines, microprocessor, relay and testing, instrumentation, control power system, network machine and design lab.

=== Mechanical Engineering ===
The department was established in 1986 (the year the college was founded)). It has an intake capacity of 120 students per batch. There are three assistant professors and 20 full-time lecturers.

The department has a block that includes classrooms, engineering drawing halls and faculty room. It has central workshops with carpentry, fitting, foundry, welding, smithy and machine shops. The labs are Heat Transfer, Dynamics, Fluid Mechanics, Material Testing, Refrigeration, Air–conditioning, Metro-logy Lab, and Vibration and Stress Analysis.

==== Computer Aided Manufacturing Laboratory ====
The center is developing a robotic lab under partial assistance from AICTE.

=== Civil Engineering ===
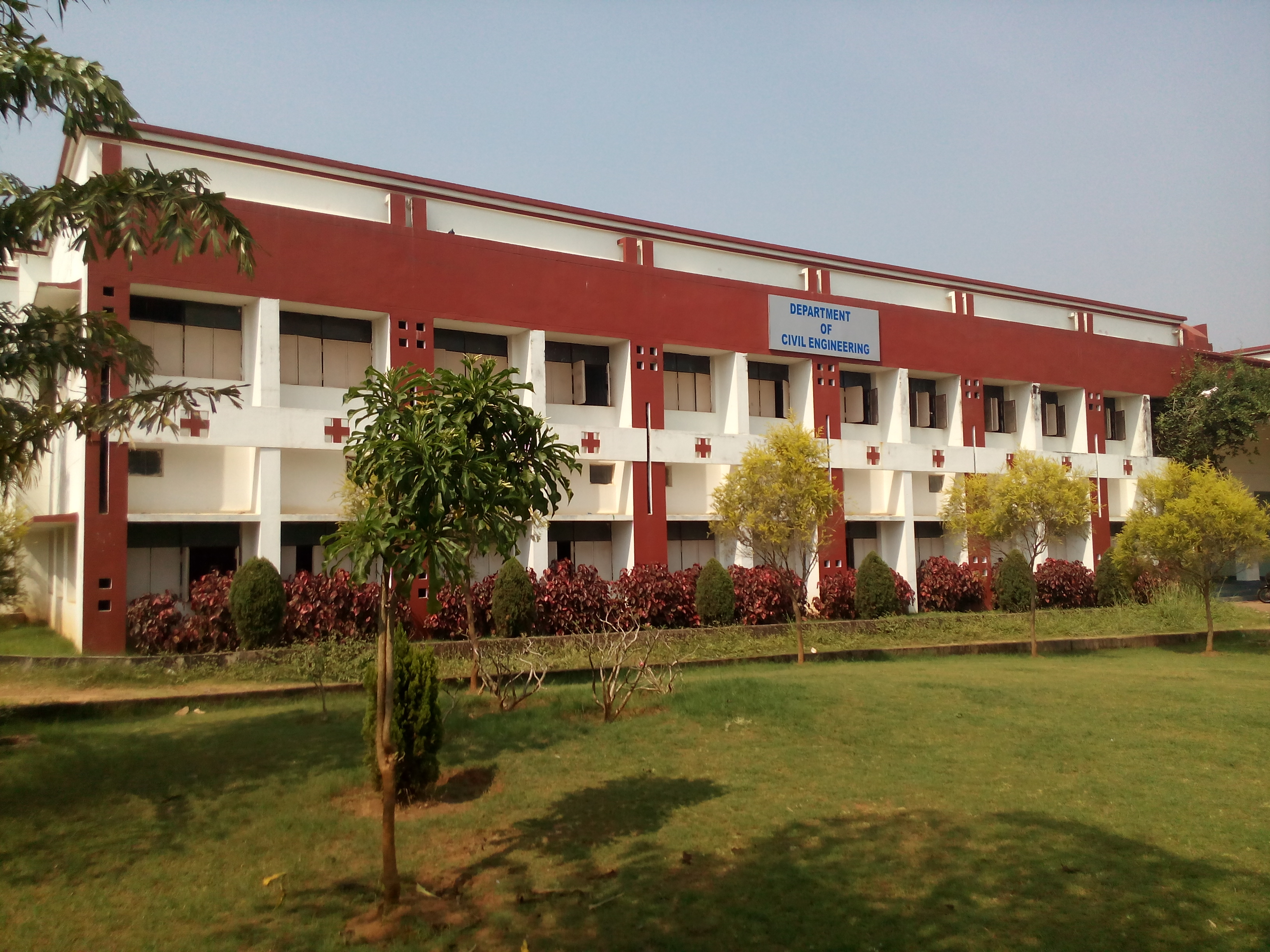
Department Of Civil Engineering

Its intake capacity is 120 students. The department is guided by one professor, one assistant professor and ten lecturers.

The department has a Hydraulics Lab, Environmental Engineering Lab, Structural Engineering Lab, Civil Engineering Lab, Survey Lab, Geo-tech Engineering Lab, Transportation Engineering Lab, and Auto CAD Lab.

=== Humanities and Sciences ===
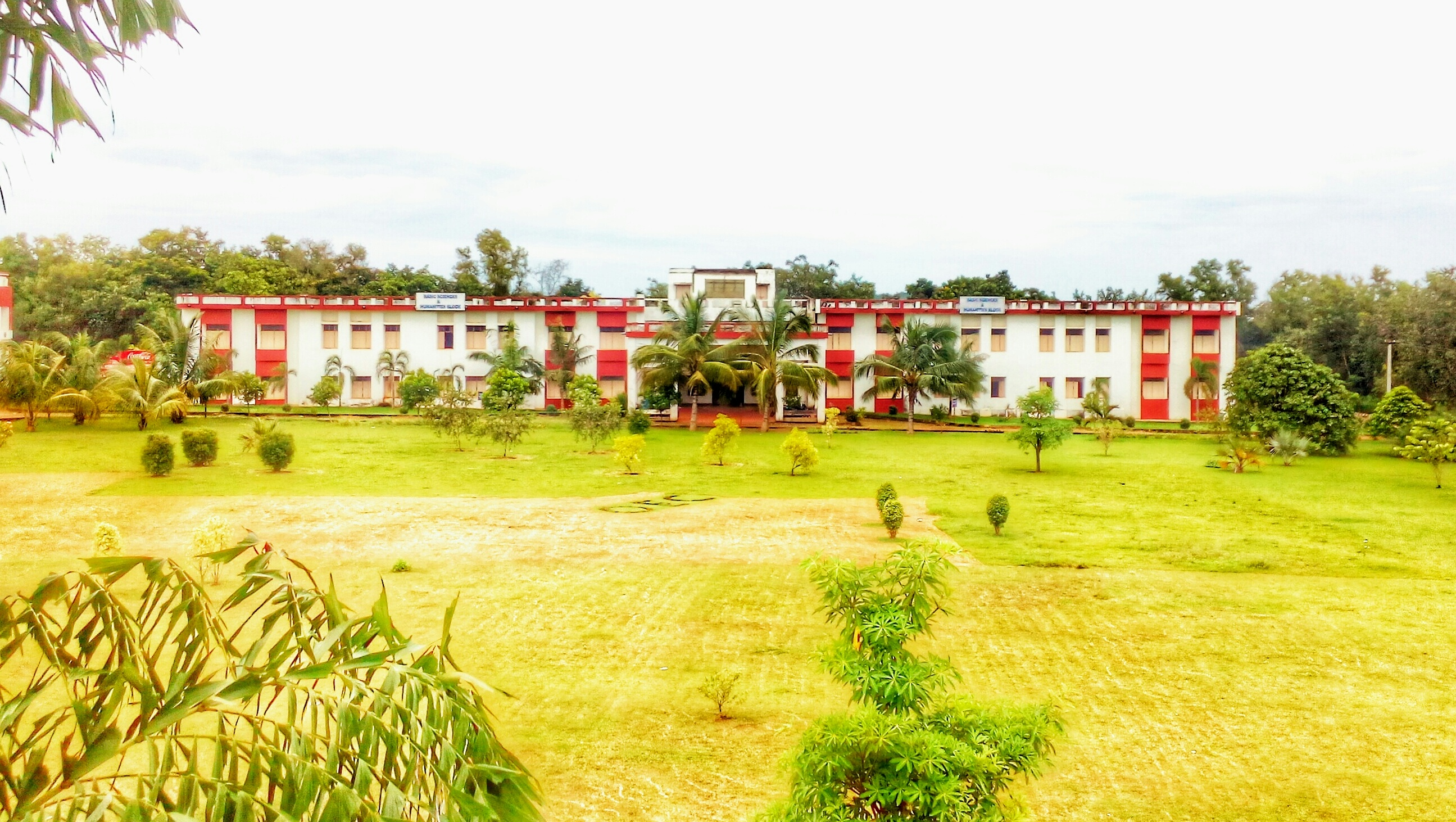
Basic Science and Humanities Block

The department comprises the departments of Mathematics, English, Economics, Physics and Chemistry. Mathematics is taught in the first two years of the engineering course. Students are taught English under the programme of ESP (English for Special Purpose).

== Training and placement department ==
This department is the apex body of the institute. Many companies are coming to participate in the campus recruitment program. Few of them are mass recruiters. LnT, TCS, Vedanta, Capgemini, Cognizant, IBM, Infosys, HCL etc. are few of the companies recruiting engineers from this institute.

== Admissions ==
Admissions conform to the regulations laid down by Biju Patnaik University of Technology, the technical university of the state of Orissa. The seats are filled up through counseling of Joint Entrance Examination (O-JEE), JEE-Main (Joint entrance examination).

== Lateral entry ==
Students who have cleared diploma with minimum 60% mark in the corresponding subject are eligible for this scheme. They are enrolled directly into the third semester of the engineering courses.

It is mandatory for all candidates to appear in the Joint Entrance Examination conducted by Biju Patnaik University of Technology, Rourkela or All India Engineering Entrance Examination conducted by Central Board of Secondary Education, Ministry of Human Resource Development, New Delhi or Joint Entrance Examination conducted by Orissa Private Engineering College Association to get a seat either through counselling.

== Facilities ==
- Dr. Sudhanshu Mohan Central Library has subscriptions to national and international journals. It subscribes to DELNET through which the students and faculty get access to more than 200 libraries across India and abroad.
- Rajlaxmi Memorial Health Centre provides health care facilities to the students and staff of the institute and renders services to the local villagers.
- Hiranya Kumar Research and Development Centre - centre for R&D.
- There are separate hostels for both boys and girls.
- Rajlaxmi Memorial Health Centre provides medical facilities to meet the needs of the students and staff pertaining to minor ailments. This dispensary also looks after the medical problems of the nearby villagers. The college organizes medical camps in the campus as well as outside the campus.
- The college has more than 50 buses which pick up the students from different corners of the city.
- Student Activity Centre - a 3,000-seat auditorium which hosts fests and events. It is the largest auditorium in the state.
- The sports complex holds many field events like cricket, volleyball, and hockey. Ranji match is also being played between teams of various states of the country. The area of the sports complex is around 3 acres. The inter college sports meet is organised in the sports complex every year and games like cricket, basketball and volleyball is organised every year attracting students from other engineering colleges of the country including IIT and NIT. Eminent cricketers like Pragyan Ojha, Debashish Mohanty and many others are invited to inaugurate the meet and distribute prizes among the winners. The basketball court, badminton and tennis courts are inside the Student Activity Center.

== Centre of management studies ==
The center of management studies is a part of Orissa engineering college that offers MBA degrees to the students taking admission into it through Common Admission Test. The center is located in front of the sports complex inside the campus. The classrooms have ample space and accommodate many students. All the classrooms are air-conditioned and well-furnished. It has separate lecture theaters and conference halls to create a fine environment to study the management subjects.

== Location ==
Orissa Engineering College is situated at the Sundarpada Jatni road in the outskirts of Bhubaneswar. The institute is spread over 58 acres (230,000 m^{2})

== Student interaction programs ==
There are two main student interaction programs. One is the tech-fest called Zazen, and other is cultural fest called Zephyr.

- Zazen is the technical festival of the college. This is a three-day meet attracting a large number of students every year, and they host a series of functions funded by different clubs.
- Zephyr is a three-day event and mostly social. There are bands that present with musical concerts and fashion parades.
