= Parala Maharaja Engineering College =

Higher education institution in Odisha, India

- ପାରଳା ମହାରାଜା ଯାନ୍ତ୍ରିକ ମହାବିଦ୍ୟାଳୟ, ବ୍ରହ୍ମପୁର
- Former name: Parala Maharaja Engineering College (PMEC)
- Type: Government
- Established: August 27, 2009
- Affiliations: Biju Patnaik University of Technology
- Chancellor: Governor of Odisha
- Principal: Sarat Kumar Sahoo
- Faculty: 960
- Students: 2216
- Location: Brahmapur, Odisha, India; 19.361681°N 84.871702°E
- Campus: 182 acres (0.7 km^{2})
- Website: www.pmec.ac.in

Parala Maharaja Engineering College (PMEC), Brahmapur, Odisha is a government engineering college in Southern Odisha, India. Established in 2009, the college was inaugurated by Naveen Patnaik, the then former chief minister of Odisha. This college is named after the King Krushna Chandra Gajapati who is regarded as the architect of an Independent united Odisha State. The Parala Maharaja engineering College was approved by the All India Council of Technical Education (AICTE) New Delhi, Govt. of India and was affiliated to Biju Patnaik University of Technology (BPUT), Rourkela, Government of Odisha but now, it is an autonomous college from 21 January 2021. This college is also accredited by the National Board of Accreditation (NBA) New Delhi, Govt. of India.

== Academic structure ==
The college provides four-year Bachelor of Technology degrees in nine disciplines of engineering: civil, computer science, automobile, production, chemical, metallurgy and material, electronics and telecommunication, mechanical, and electrical engineering.

A three-year B.Tech degree for student who has completed their Diploma. All courses are full-time.

Each academic year consists of two semesters and a summer term. The education is organized around a credit system, which ensures continuous evaluation of a student's performance and provides flexibility to choose courses to suit the student's ability or convenience. Each course is assigned credits depending upon the class hours.

The college also provides M.Tech degrees in five disciplines: Mechanical engineering, Power system engineering, Structural engineering, Production engineering and Thermal engineering, since 2015.

== Admission ==
The admission to B.Tech courses is done through OJEE and JEE conducted each year. Lateral entry admissions after diploma is made through OJEE conducted each year by the Government of Odisha.

The admission to M.Tech courses is done through GATE entrance exam.

The students are placed in IOCL, BPCL, ONGC, NTPC, HPCL, BARC and state-level engineering services (AEE) of Odisha.

== Examination ==
Registration is required at the beginning of each semester. Students appear for examination for registered courses only. Students are eligible to appear for examinations provided they attend a minimum of 75 percent of their theory, practical and sessional classes scheduled during the semester.

== Departments ==
- Automobile Engineering (60)
- Civil Engineering (120)
- Chemical Engineering (60)
- Computer Science and Engineering (60)
- Electrical Engineering (120)
- Electronics and Telecommunication Engineering (60)
- Mechanical Engineering (120)
- Material and Metallurgy Engineering (30)
- Science and Humanities (Physics, Chemistry, Maths, English, Economics & Management)
