= MITM =

MITM may refer to:

- Man-in-the-middle attack, a computer networking attack
- Meet-in-the-middle attack, a cryptographic attack
- Modern Institute of Technology and Management, India
- Master of Information Technology Management, a master's degree
- Malcolm in the Middle, an American sitcom
- Man In The Mirror, a Michael Jackson 1987 song

== See also ==
- Man-in-the-mobile (MitMo), a computer security attack
