= Bibhusita Das =

Indian marine engineer

- Born: Cuttack, Odisha, India
- Education: C. V. Raman College of Engineering, Bhubaneshwar (B.Tech.)
- Occupation: On-board marine engineer
- Known for: Odisha’s first woman marine engineer

Bibhusita Das is an Indian marine engineer. She is among one the earliest Odia woman to become a marine engineer. Das is among one the earliest woman from Odisha to serve as an officer on a shipping vessel. As the only woman in an otherwise all-male crew she has defied social pressure and set aside societal conventions to do so.

== Early life and education ==
Bibhusita Das was born and brought up in Cuttack, Odisha. Her father Kurunakar Das is a retired Bharat Sanchar Nigam Limited (BSNL) employee. The youngest of four sisters, she credits her parents for their support and encouragement.

My mother and father always encouraged us to study and said there was no difference between a girl and a boy. All my three sisters are engineers. But I am the only marine engineer.

— Bibhusita Das

Das completed a four-year Bachelor of Technology (B. Tech.) at C. V. Raman College of Engineering, Bhubaneshwar, Odisha in 2007. She was the only one of the 7 girls in her engineering group to opt for on-board sailing.

== Career ==
After working as a lecturer in Tirunelveli for six months, she was hired by the Shipping Corporation of India and opted for an on-board position.

In 2012, she was promoted to third engineer at the Shipping Corporation of India. In 2013, as the Marine Engineer of the cargo ship MV Biswamahal, Bibhusita Das was felicitated by the Port Trust, after the ship arrived in Paradip port en route from Australia.

Her work can involve hard physical labor managing the ship's machinery. Voyages can last up to six months at a time. Her job has enabled her to travel to many countries including Australia, South Africa, Turkey, Britain, and Germany.

== Personal life ==
As of 2018 she lived at Koel Nagar, Rourkela.

== See also ==
- Kiran Bedi
- Marine engineering
- Punita Arora
- Seema Rao
- Women in engineering
