= C. V. Raman Global University =

Private University in Bhubaneswar, Odisha

- Former name: C. V. Raman College of Engineering (CVRCE)
- Motto: Quality Education for New Millennium
- Type: Private
- Established: 1997; 29 years ago (as CVRCE); February 29, 2020; 6 years ago (as University)
- Affiliations: BPUT, AICTE, NAAC, NBA
- President: Er. Sanjib Kumar Rout
- Vice-Chancellor: Dr. Banshidhar Majhi
- Location: Bhubaneswar, Odisha, India; 20.220493°N 85.736457°E
- Campus: Bidyanagar, Mahura, Janla, Bhubaneswar
- Website: cgu-odisha.ac.in

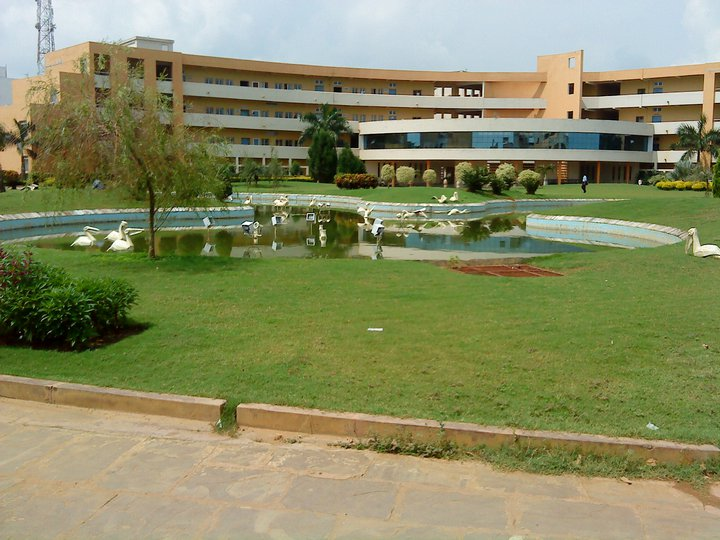
CGU campus

C. V. Raman Global University is an engineering and management institution located in Bhubaneswar, Odisha, India. It was established in 1997 as C.V. Raman College of Engineering by Sanjib Kumar Rout under C.V. Raman Group of Institutions. The institution is accredited by the National Board of Accreditation (NBA) and is certified to ISO 9001:2000 quality.

The institution is rated "A" by National Assessment and Accreditation Council (NAAC) and was affiliated to Biju Patnaik University of Technology (BPUT). On 29 February 2020, the college was granted university status and was renamed C. V. Raman Global University.

== Academics ==
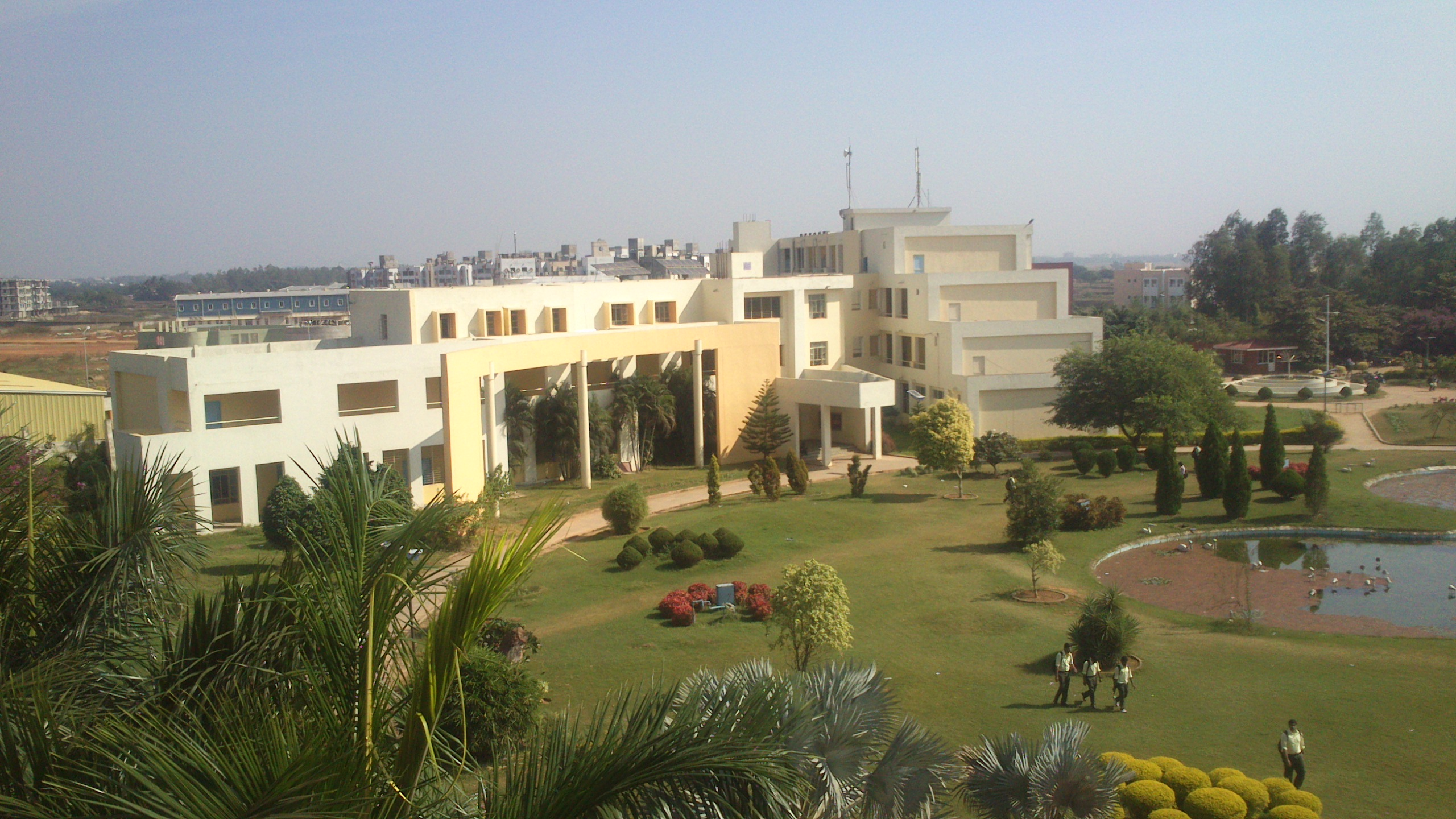
Mechanical Building

The university offers four-year undergraduate B.Tech degree programs and two-year postgraduate degree M.Tech programmes. It also offers a three-year postgraduate degree program in Master of Computer Applications, two-year master's degree in MBA and three-year B.Tech degree for diploma holders under lateral entry scheme with the approval of All India Council for Technical Education (AICTE). It also offers a three-year Diploma in Engineering in various disciplines under Odisha State Council of Technical Education and Vocational Training.

=== Rankings ===
University rankings

Engineering – India
- NIRF (2024): 96

C. V. Raman Global University, Bhubaneshwar was ranked 96th among engineering colleges by the National Institutional Ranking Framework (NIRF) in 2024 and in the 151-200 band overall.
