= Ghanashyam Hemalata Institute of Technology and Management =

Private institute located in outside the city of Puri, India

- Type: Private
- Established: 14 February 1997
- Founder: Sri Ghanashayam Jena
- Affiliations: BPUT
- Students: 300
- Location: Puri, Odisha, India; 19.855556°N 85.954722°E
- Campus: Rural
- Website: www.ghitmpuri.in

The Ghanashyam Hemalata Institute of Technology and Management (GHITM) is a private institute located in outside the city of Puri, in the Indian state of Odisha. The institute's campus is spread over 122 acres (0.49 km^{2}) at Rasnanda Jena Vihar. GHITM has one school and one college, containing a total of four academic departments. GHITM is affiliated with the Biju Patnaik University of Technology (BPUT). The institute is located on National Highway 203, popularly known as Marine Drive, about 15 kilometres (9.3 mi) from Puri. The campus is spread over approximately 122 acres (49 ha) of land on the eastern shore of the Bay of Bengal. The institute is recognized by the Govt. Of India, approved by the All India Council for Technical Education and affiliated with Biju Patnaik University of Technology.
