= Indira Gandhi Institute of Technology, Sarang =

College of technology in Odisha, India

- Type: Public/Government
- Established: 1982
- Affiliations: Autonomous, since 2017
- Director: Dr.Bidyadhar Sahoo
- Faculty: 215 (2019)
- Students: 4373(2022)
- Undergraduates: 4000(2022)
- Postgraduates: 373 (2019)
- Location: Dhenkanal, Odisha, India; 20.93505°N 85.26331°E
- Campus: 179 acres (72 ha); Rural
- Website: www.igitsarang.ac.in

Indira Gandhi Institute of Technology (IGIT), Sarang was founded in 1982 as Odisha College of Engineering (OCE), initially managed directly by the Govt. of Odisha. The institute's origins can be traced back to 1981 when it operated as Modern Polytechnic (MPT), offering diploma courses in Civil, Electrical, Mechanical, and Mining Survey Engineering.

In 1987, OCE and MPT merged and were renamed IGIT, Sarang, with management transferred to an Autonomous Society.

In 2014, the Government of Odisha decided to elevate IGIT to a unitary university. In 2017, the University Grants Commission (UGC) granted IGIT autonomous status.

== History ==
IGIT was established in 1982 and was managed directly by the government of Odisha in the name of Odisha College of Engineering (OCE). Prior to this, since 1981, the institute under the name Modern Polytechnic (MPT) offered Diploma Courses in civil, electrical, mechanical, and mining survey engineering. In 1987, OCE and MPT were merged and renamed as IGIT, Sarang, and the management was transferred to an Autonomous Society. This is the first Govt. Engg. College in Odisha to have accreditation from NBA (AICTE).

== Campus ==
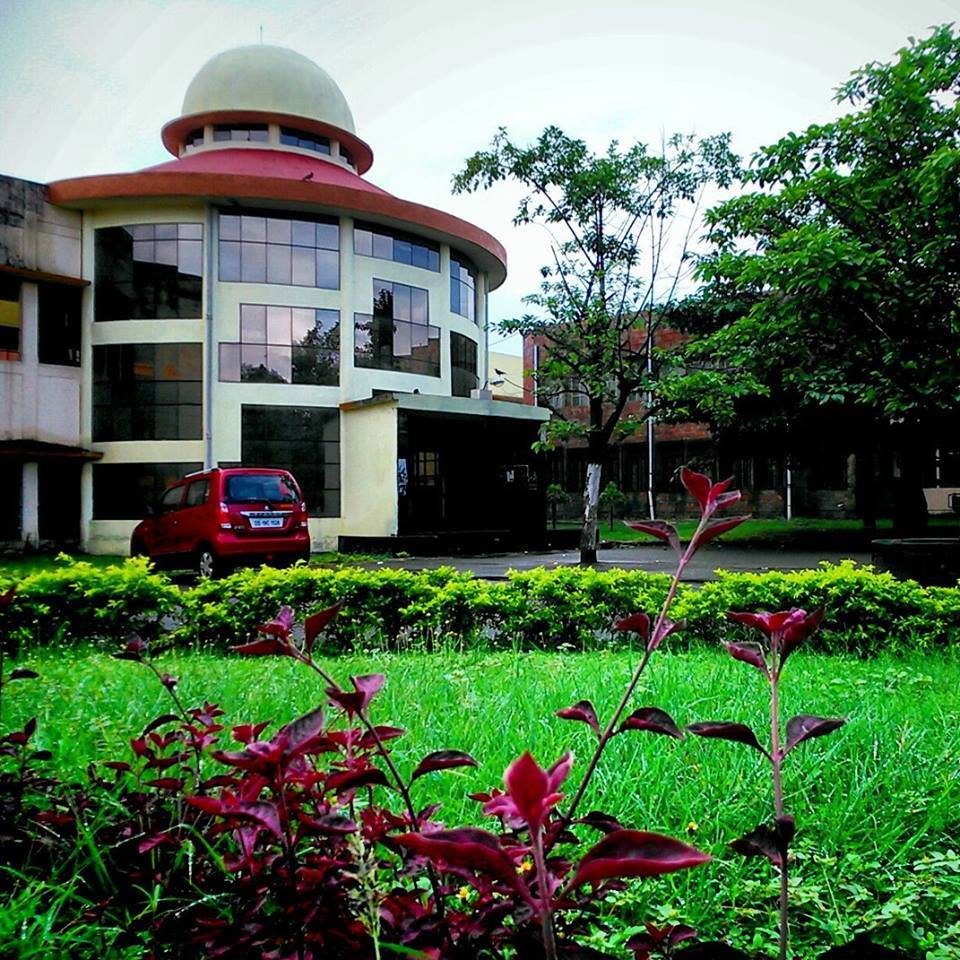
The iconic dome of IGIT, Sarang

The institute is residential with an integrated campus covering 179 acres of land encompassing hostels, staff quarters and the Dr. M. P. Mishra Memorial Stadium, with basketball, volleyball and badminton courts. The institute has facilities like the Central Library (with 27,000 volumes of books), Central Computer Centre, Central Workshop, Knowledge Centre, eight student hostels with accommodation for over 1300 students whereas present intake is 1200 per year (only B.Tech not including M.Tech, M.Sc, Diploma). Other amenities include SBI (Core Bank facilities), guesthouse, on-campus dispensary, post office, canteen, gymnasium, and a students and employees co-operative.

== Courses ==
The institution offers undergraduate and post-graduate programs in engineering and natural sciences. The following academic programmes are available at IGIT :

- Bachelor of Architecture (B.Arch)
- Bachelor of Technology (B.Tech)
- Master of Technology (M.Tech)
- Diploma in Engineering
- Master of Computer Applications (MCA)
- Master of Science (M.Sc)
- Doctor of Philosophy (Ph.D.)

=== Undergraduate courses ===
The institute offers 4-year undergraduate degree program in the following disciplines :

- Chemical Engineering (accredited by NBA)
- Civil Engineering (accredited by NBA)
- Computer Science & Engineering
- Electrical Engineering (accredited by NBA)
- Electronics & Telecommunication Engineering
- Metallurgy and Material Engineering (accredited by NBA)
- Mechanical Engineering (accredited by NBA)
- Production Engineering
- Architecture

IGIT also offers 3-year B.Tech degree for diploma holders under lateral entry scheme with the approval of AICTE New Delhi, recognised by the government of Odisha and affiliated under Biju Patnaik University of Technology, Rourkela.

=== Postgraduate courses ===
The institute offers two part-time and nine full-time Postgraduate degree program in the following engineering disciplines :

- Environmental science (part-time for 2.5 years)
- Production engineering (part-time for 2 years)
- Electronics and Telecommunication Engineering
- Geotechnical Engineering
- Power Electronics and Drives Engineering
- Power Systems Engineering
- Production Engineering
- Metallurgy and Materials Science Engineering
- Industrial Metallurgy
- Mechanical System Design Engineering
- Structural engineering
- Master in Computer Application (MCA)

In addition to the above courses, IGIT, Sarang has also been recognised as the centre of excellence in the field of engineering research by Utkal University, Vani Vihar, Bhubaneswar, Odisha.

=== Diploma Engineering courses ===
The institute offers a 3-year Diploma in the following engineering disciplines :

- Civil Engineering
- Electrical Engineering
- Electronics & Telecommunication Engineering
- Metallurgy and Material Engineering Engineering

== Central Library ==
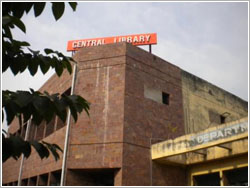
Central Library

The library has a collection of 27,000 text & reference books, handbooks, and IS codes. About 50 journals are subscribed to. The library's transaction service is fully automated.

== Student halls of residence ==
The institute is fully residential and provides hostel accommodation for all students. The institute has seven residential halls:

- Akash Bhawan - All first-year boys (B.Tech)
- Aryabhatta Bhawan - All second-year boys (B.Tech)
- Bhaskar Bhawan - Third-year boys (B.Tech/B.Arch)
- Brahmos Bhawan - Third year, final year and fifth year boys (B.Tech/B.Arch)
- Surya Bhawan - All final year boys (B.Tech)
- Agni Bhawan - All Diploma boys
- Rohini Bhawan - All girl students of B.Tech/B.Arch first and second year, M.Tech, MCA & Diploma
- Prithvi Bhawan - All third-year and final-year girls (B.Tech/B.Arch).

== College festivals ==
- Horizon: Horizon is the institute's annual techno-cultural fest.
- Technovation: Techno-Cultural fest of the Department of CSE&A, IGIT, Sarang held under the aegis of Mycomp Society, IGIT.
- Admantium: National level technical symposium held by Department of Metallurgical and Materials Engineering every year since 2014.

== Student organisations ==
- Society for Physical Education & Recreation (SPER)
- Social Service Guild (SSG)
- IGIT Cultural Association
- Mycomp Society
- Society Of Literary Enthusiasts (SOLE)
- Audio Visual Club
- IGIT Robotics Society
- National cadet corps (NCC)
