= Vignan Institute of Technology and Management =

Engineering college in Odisha, India

- Other names: VITAM Berhampur; VITAM
- Type: Engineering college
- Established: 27 August 2009; 17 years ago
- Affiliations: Biju Patnaik University of Technology
- Undergraduates: 960
- Location: Berhampur, Odisha, India; 19°21′42″N 84°52′18″E
- Campus: 0.3 km^{2} (85 acres)
- Website: www.vitam.edu.in

Vignan Institute of Technology and Management (acronym is VITAM; also called VITAM Berhampur) is an engineering college located in Berhampur, in southern Odisha, India. Established in 2009 by Naveen Patnaik, the then chief minister of Odisha, the college has one academic building and one workshop. It is a constituent college of Biju Patnaik University of Technology (BPUT). This college was named after King Krushna Chandra Gajapati, the creator of modern Odisha.

== Academic structure ==
The college provides 4-year Bachelor of Technology degrees in 6 disciplines^{[3]} of engineering: Civil Engineering, Computer Science Engineering, Electronics and Telecommunication Engineering, Mechanical Engineering, Electrical and Electronics Engineering, and Applied Electronics and Instrumentation Engineering. A three-year B.Tech degree for diploma holders as lateral entries is also offered. All courses are full-time. The college also provides 2-year Master of Technology degrees in 2 specializations: Machine Design and ETCE and also a Master of Business Administration degree

Each academic year consists of two semesters and a summer term. The education system is organized around a credit system, which ensures continuous evaluation of a student's performance and provides flexibility to choose courses to suit the student's ability or convenience. Each course is assigned credits depending upon the class hours.

== Affiliation ==
VITAM is the Life Member International Accreditation Organization (IAO) Houston U.S.A. and VITAM as having GoL MOU with Glewford University (U.S.A) ( faculty and student exchange Programmes).

VITAM is an ISO 9001:2015 self-funded Technology and Management Institute.[3]

== Admission ==
Intake into different degree courses in this institute is made only through a "Joint Entrance Examination" conducted each year by the government of Odisha. This year over sought its admission through jee-main previously known as "AIEEE". The details of the eligibility, reservation, medical requirements, procedure for admission, etc. are given as per the information brochure of "OJEE"-2015.

== Placements ==
The college's placement record varied across academic years. During the 2014–15 placement season, five students received off-campus job offers from Tata Consultancy Services (TCS), with the highest reported annual salary package being ₹3.2 lakh per annum. Graduates from the 2013 and 2014 batches reportedly secured employment with companies including IBM, TCS, Cognizant, Capgemini, Infosys, Accenture, and Aricent. Some graduates also joined public sector organisations such as BARC and HAL, while others pursued postgraduate studies (MTech) at institutions including the Indian Institutes of Technology (IITs) and National Institutes of Technology (NITs).

== Examination ==
Registration is required at the beginning of each semester. Students are allowed to appear for examination for registered courses only and should consult with the respective department heads for guidance before registration. Students are eligible to appear for examinations provided they attend a minimum of 75% of their theory, practical, and sessional classes scheduled during the semester.

== Departments ==
Four existing branches and three new branches are offered by B.TECH:

Branch	Intake
Civil engineering	120
Computer science and engineering	60
Electronics and telecommunications engineering	60
Mechanical engineering	120
Electrical and electronics engineering	60
Applied electronics and instrumentation engineering	60

An additional department of Basic Science and Humanities is available. This department includes Mathematics, Physics, Chemistry, English, Economics and Management.
