= GIET University =

Private Technical University in Odisha, India

Coordinates: 19°02′55″N 83°49′59″E

- Former names: Gandhi Institute of Engineering and Technology
- Type: Private
- Established: 1997
- Affiliations: UGC, AICTE, NAAC, NBA
- Vice-Chancellor: Dr. Goutam Ghosh
- Location: Gunupur, Odisha, India
- Campus: Spread over 113.03 acres
- Website: www.giet.edu

GIET University, formerly Gandhi Institute of Engineering and Technology, is a private university located at Gunupur, in the state of Odisha, India, established in 1997 by the Vidya Bharati Educational Trust.

GIET University offers undergraduate, postgraduate and doctoral programs in various fields of engineering, technology, management, and computer applications.

== Managing trustee ==
Edu-entrepreneur Dr. Satya Prakash Panda (President) and Dr. Chandra Dhwaj Panda (Vice-President) founded in 1996 a trust called Vidya Bharati Education Trust, which is a non-governmental organization and a conglomerate of educational institutions.

== Schools ==
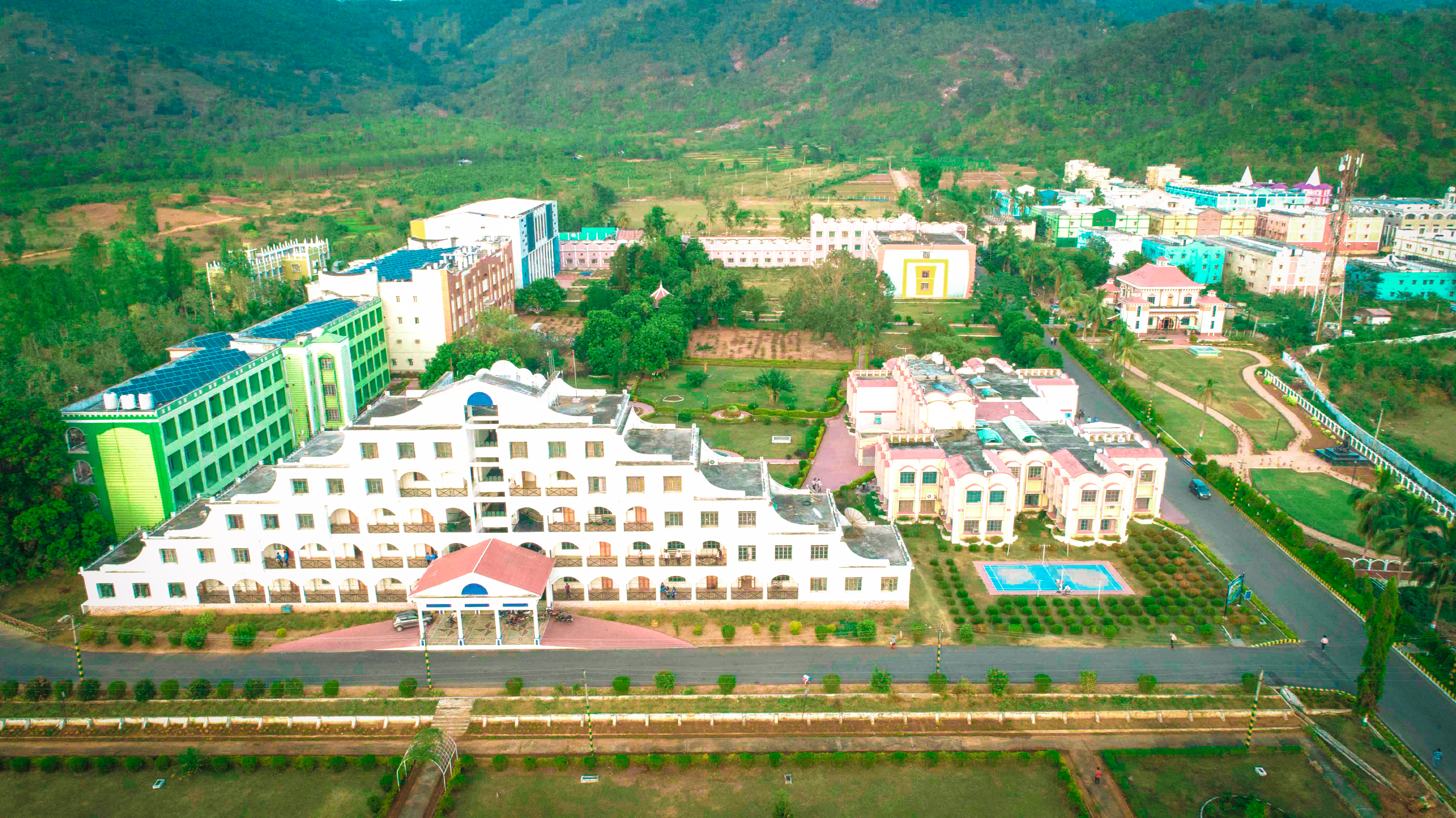

GIETU includes the following schools:

- School of Engineering and Technology
- School of Humanities & Social Studies
- School of Agriculture
- School of Sciences
- School of Management Studies (SMS)
- School of Nursing
- School of Pharmacy

== Academic programmes ==
GIET University conducts four-year B. Tech, B.SC Agriculture, B.Sc in Nursing, 3 years BBA, BCA and 2 years M.Sc, M.Tech programme in various disciplines: GIET University offers some of the most sought-after programmes including 14 undergraduates and 20 postgraduate programmes. In addition to undergraduate and postgraduate courses, GIETU also offers full-time and part time Ph.D. degrees in Engineering, Natural Sciences and Management disciplines.

== National Institutional Ranking Framework rankings ==
GIET University, Gunupur, was ranked in the 200-300 band in the National Institutional Ranking Framework 2024 rankings for Engineering.

University rankings

Engineering – India
- NIRF (2024): 201-300
