= Majhighariani Institute of Technology and Science =

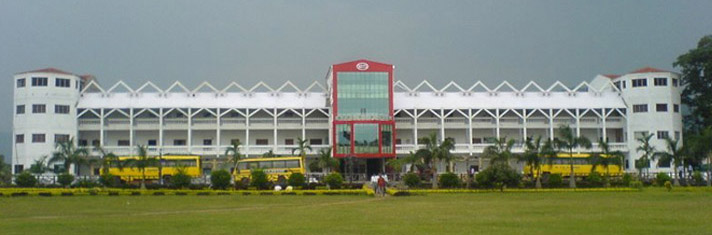
- Motto: "Ensures Smart Education"
- Type: Public
- Established: 1999
- Location: Bhujabal, Kolnara, Rayagada, Odisha, India; 19.246164°N 83.446272°E
- Campus: Urban
- Affiliations: BPUT
- Website: mits.edu.in

Majhighariani Institute of Technology and Science (or MITS) is located in Rayagada, Odisha, India. It was started in 1999 by the Basantdevi Charitable Trust. Its name came from the Goddess Majhighariani, deity of Rayagada. The college was approved by the All India Council for Technical Education (AICTE) and the government of Odisha. The college is affiliated to Biju Patnaik University of Technology (BPUT), Rourkela and Berhampur University. It is an ISO 9001:2008 certified institute of eastern India.

== Location ==
The campus is 15 km from Rayagada on the State Highway. It is around 4.4 KM away from JayKaypur.

== Trust ==
The Basanta Devi Charitable Trust derives its name from the venerable Late Smt. Basanta Devi, mother of Sri Balakrishna Panda & Sri Subash Chandra Panda, its chief architects, Managing Trustee & Founder Trustee respectively.

== History ==
Majhighariani Institute Of Technology & Science, Rayagada was started in 1999 under the patronage of Basanta Devi Charitable Trust in the memory of the Panda family. Started in a modest campus at Bhakuruguda on the way from Rayagada to Jaykaypur, MITS has developed into a campus of fifty acres at Bhujbal. It drew its name from the Goddess Majhighariani, the reigning deity of Rayagada.

It has planned buildings, including a multi-storeyed main building housing classrooms, laboratories, a library, a seminar hall, an examination hall, offices, etc., and 8 sloping roofed but permanent structures housing duty laboratories, a drawing hall, a canteen, an auditorium, etc. The campus also has a playground and a Gayatri Temple. MITS Boys Hostel is on the campus, whereas the Girls Hostel is in Rayagada Town.

Having started with a mere three engineering disciplines at B.Tech level, it now has ECE, EEE, CSE, IT, BIOTECH, ME, CE, EE. MITS is the 1st institution to have started the B.Tech course in Biotechnology in the entire state of Orissa. It added M.Sc. Course in Biotechnology and Microbiology, Industrial Biotechnology and Bioinformatics & M.Tech Course in Electronic Information System. Recently, it entered into the area of Industrial Biotechnology. Having envisaged to state a Bio-Diesel Project, it is now prompting and spreading cultivation of Jatropha plants in large areas of Orissa.

== Courses offerings ==
=== B.Tech ===
- Biotechnology
- Computer Science
- Electronics & Communication
- Electrical & Electronics
- Electrical
- Information Technology
- Mechanical
- Civil

=== M.Tech ===
- Biotechnology
- Computer Science
- Electronics & Information System
- Industrial Engineering

=== M.Sc ===
- Biotechnology
- Industrial Biotechnology
- Microbiology
- Bioinformatics
- Computer Science
- Telecommunication Engineering

== Departments ==
- Department of Basic Science & Humanities
- Department of Engg. Mathematics
- Department of Engg. Physics
- Department of Engg. Chemistry
- Department of Communicative English
- Department of Management Studies
- Department of Biotechnology
- Department of Civil Engineering,
- Department of Computer Science & Engineering and Information Technology,
- Department of Electronics & Communication Engineering,
- Department of Electrical & Electronics Engineering,
- Department of Mechanical Engineering
