= Modern Institute of Technology and Management =

College in Bhubaneswar, Odisha, India

- Other name: MITM
- Motto: Where Hope Shines; Think Success, Think MITM
- Type: Private engineering educational institute
- Established: 2008
- Affiliations: AICTE and BPUT
- Chairperson: Himadri Lenka
- Principal: Dr Dillip Kumar Sahoo
- Undergraduates: B.Tech
- Postgraduates: MBA
- Location: Bhubaneswar, Odisha, India; 20.3051°N 85.7141°E
- Campus: Kantabaada, Bidyabihar
- Website: http://www.mitm.edu.in/

The Modern Institute of Technology and Management (MITM), Odia: ମଡ଼ର୍ଣ୍ଣ ବୈଷୟିକ ଓ ପରିଚାଳନା ପ୍ରତିଷ୍ଠାନ) is an engineering and management institute in Bhubaneswar, the capital of Odisha. This institution is approved by All India Council for Technical Education and affiliated to Biju Patnaik University of Technology, Rourkela. This college was established in 2008 by Prof. Dr. K.C.Dash under the Basanti Dash trust.

== Campus ==
This Institute has well equipped laboratories, Workshop along with English language laboratory. Computer labs have facilities with Linux platform with intranet and internet facilities.

== Courses ==
This college offers graduation courses (B.Tech.) in:

- Electrical Engineering
- Electrical and Electronics Engineering
- Electronics and Communication Engineering
- Civil Engineering
- Mechanical Engineering
- Computer Science and Engineering

and Post Graduation Course (MBA) in:

- Human Resource Management
- Marketing Management
- Financial Management

== Departments ==
Departments present in this institute are:

- Electrical Department
- Electronics Department
- Mechanical Department
- Civil Department
- Basic Science and Humanities Department
- Management Department

== See also ==
- List of colleges affiliated to Biju Patnaik University of Technology
