= Berhampur Patta =

Design of Indian clothing

Berhampur Patta (phoda kumbha) saree and joda
- Geographical indication
- Type: Handicraft
- Area: Brahmapur, Odisha
- Country: India
- Material: Fabric

Berhampur Patta or Brahmapuri Patta saree is registered (application no. 220) under the Geographical Indications (GI) of Goods (Registration and Protection) Act by Government of India. The "sari" meant for women and the "joda" meant for men. For this famous silk work, Brahmapur is also known as silk city of India.

The Berhampuri silk saree is unique due to its typical Odissi style of weaving and kumbha, particularly phoda, temple type design. "The zari work border design is different from others. The weaving technique is said to have originated over 200 years ago. The finely woven sarees were known to be exported to southeast Asian and other countries through the Gopalpur port in the days of yore. The sarees also adorn the deities of Jagannath, Balabhadra and Subhadra at the Jagannath temple in Puri.

== Marketing ==
Most of these products are sold through cooperative societies and Boyanika. There are three weavers cooperative societies in the Brahmapur town. They sell products worth Rs 1.50 crore to Rs 2 crore annually. For marketing, they have their own website and also some leading online shopping sites are enabling online orders for these fabric products.
