= Bhadrak Institute of Engineering & Technology =

Bhadrak Institute of Engineering & Technology, Barapada & Barapada School of Engineering & Technology
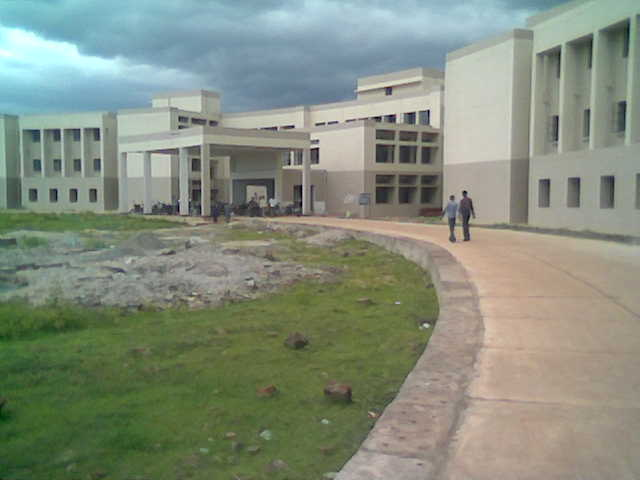
- Type: Engineering and technology institute
- Established: 1982
- Affiliations: BPUT, SCTEVT, AICTE, UGC, NBA
- Location: Bhadrak, Orissa, 756113, India
- Campus: 100 acres; Urban
- Website: https://www.bietbhadrak.ac.in/

Bhadrak Institute of Engineering & Technology, formerly Barapada School of Engnineering and Technology (BSET), was founded in 1957. Harekrushna Mahatab, former Chief Minister of Odisha, India conceived the idea with the objective of developing it in due course to a rural university.

Initially the school was organized and managed by a citizen of Bhadrak, Narendra Prasad Das. However, in the middle 1960s, it was closed down. It restarted in 1982 as Barapda School of Engineering & Technology (BSET) at the same site. This was possible due to the leadership of Chintamani Mohanty, a leading advocate of Bhadrak, who acted as the President of the governing body. Its growth was further advanced when Sri Jugal Kishore Pattnaik, the Minister of Odisha obtained help for its improvement.

In the meantime, the governing body was reconstituted with Sri Debendra Mohapatra as its president. The institution embarked upon a new phase of development when the governing body was reconstituted in July 1990, with Sj. Prafulla Samal, the Minister of State of Labour & Employment, as its president.

Bhadrak Institute of Engineering & Technology (BIET) in Odisha, India, was established in 1982. The Degree Engineering Courses started in 1997, M.C.A. Courses in 1998, MBA. courses in 2002 and the ITI courses in 2000.

BIET is a life member of the Indian Society for Technical Education (ISTE). There is an ISTE student chapter, which conducts seminars and workshops.

The college is spread over 10.33 acres.

== Affiliation ==
The institution offers B.Tech, M.Tech and MBA courses. These are approved by All India Council for Technical Education (AICTE), New Delhi, recognized by the government of Odisha and affiliated to Biju Pattnaik University of Technology (BPUT), Rourkela. And Diploma affiliated to ACTEVT

== Facilities ==
=== Hostel ===
There are four hostels: East, West, and North for boys, and Titanic for girls.

=== Library ===
The institute has a library-cum-reading room located in the main academic block that caters to the need of teachers and students. It has 50,000 volumes of text and reference books. The library subscribes to 115 journals and periodicals, multimedia, CDs by IITians, study materials of NPTEL /MIT and e-journals (IEEE/IEE, ASME).

=== Transport ===
BIET has a fleet of vehicles to cater to the transportation needs of its students, staff members and visiting guests. These buses serve as the link between the campus and the city.

=== Health Care ===
A PHC situated adjacent to the college campus meets any health-related casualty. Two ambulances provide a 24-hour service. A pharmacist has been appointed with a first-Aid centre to help the students.

Bank

United Bank Of India & Punjab National bank wings are available

== Location ==
The institute is located at Barapada, about 8 km from Bhadrak and 140 km from Bhubaneswar.

== Departments ==
MCA and MBA degree courses are approved by the All India Council for Technical Education (AICTE), New Delhi, recognized by Government of Odisha and affiliated to Biju Patnaik University of Technology (BPUT), Rourkela. The Diploma courses are affiliated to the State Council for Technical Education & Vocational Training (SCTE & VT), Odisha.

The institute offers B.Tech. (Bachelor of Technology) 4 years programme in the following disciplines:

- Civil Engineering
- Computer Science and Engineering
- Electronics and Communication Engineering
- Information Technology
- Mechanical Engineering
- Electrical Engineering

Diploma 3-year programme in the following disciplines:

- Civil Engineering (CE)(120)
- Computer Science and Engineering (CS)(60)
- Electronics and Communication Engineering (ETC)(90)
- Information Technology (IT)(30)
- Mechanical Engineering (ME)(120)
- Electrical Engineering (EE)(90)

M.Tech 2-year programme in the following disciplines:

- Mechanical Engineering (ME)
- Electrical Engineering (EE)

== Other departments ==
- Department of Mathematics & Humanities
- Department of Chemistry
- Department of Physics
- Department of MCA
- Department of Business Administration
