= 1991 Bhadrak riot =

Indian Riot

The 1991 Bhadrak riot took place on Ram Navami in Bhadrak of Odisha on 20 March 1991. The riot happened during the Ram Navami procession while the procession was passing through the Muslim dominated area of Bhadrak town. A riot gave rise to stone-throwing, looting, and arson of public properties. Puruna Bazar and Chandan Bazar were the most affected regions in this communal riot. Md. Abdul Bari played an important role in restoring peace between the two communities. He was later awarded the National Harmony Award by Pranab Mukherjee in 2011.
