= Bhadrak =

- City
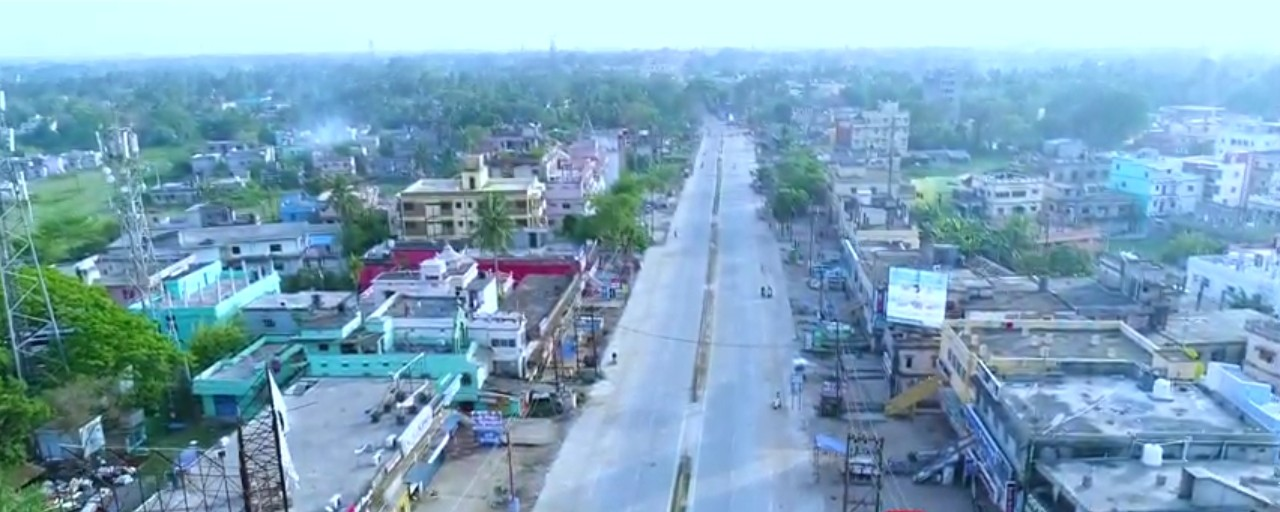
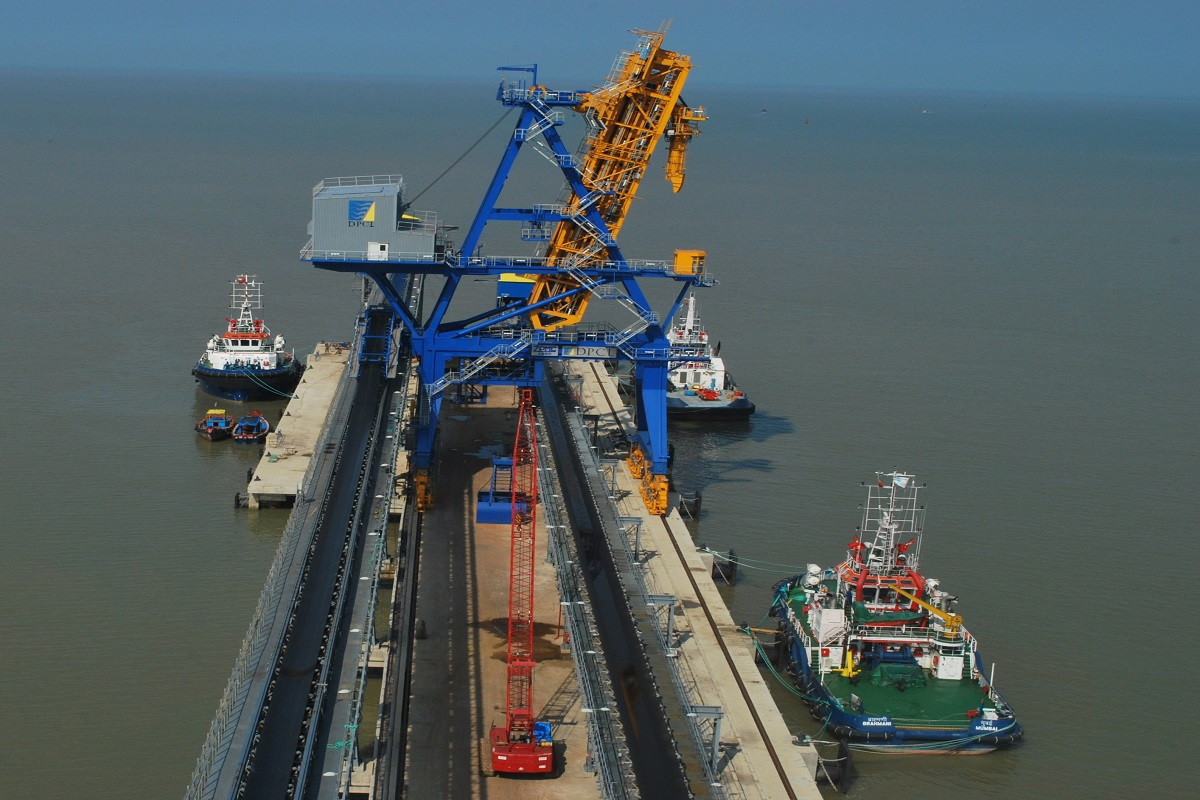
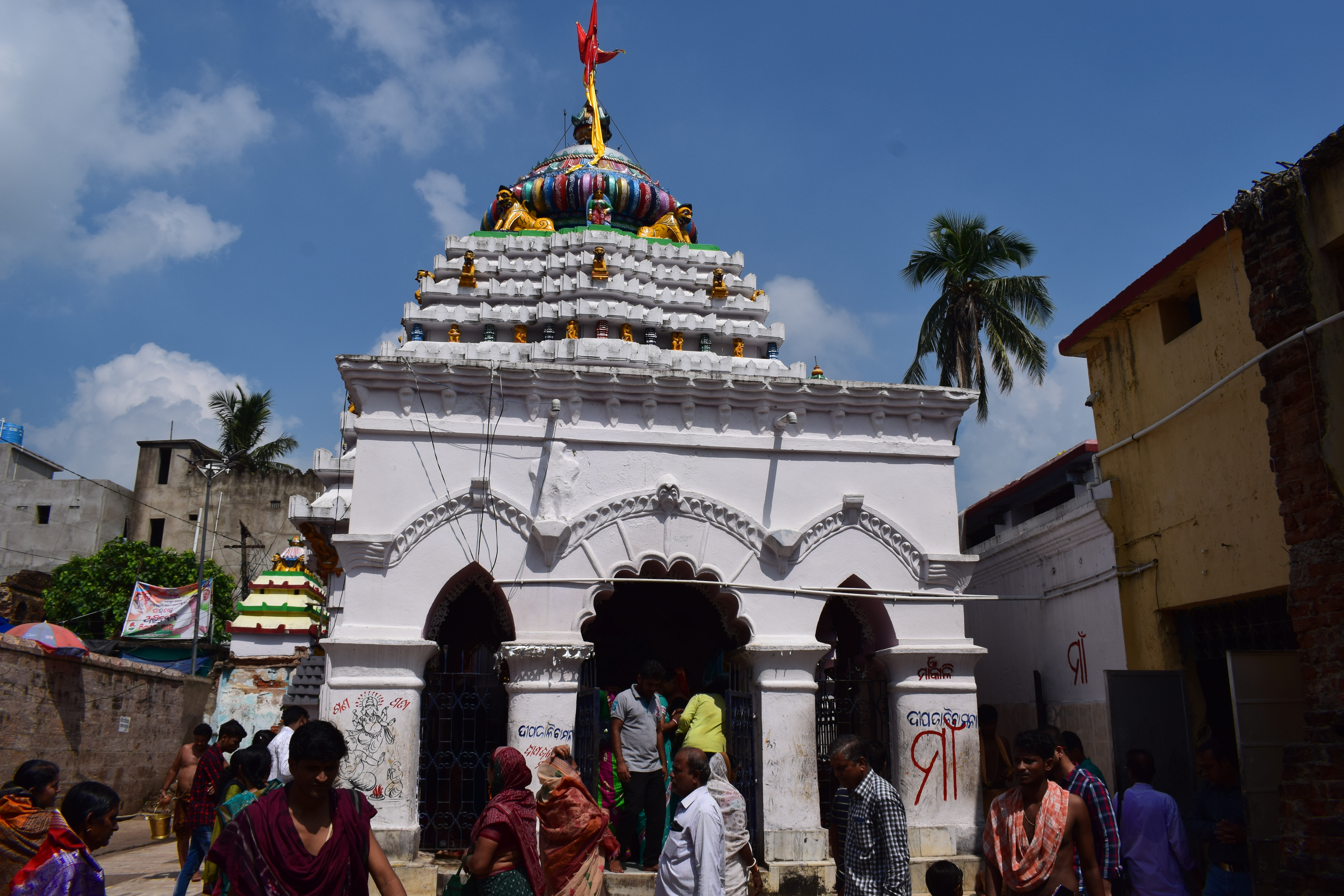
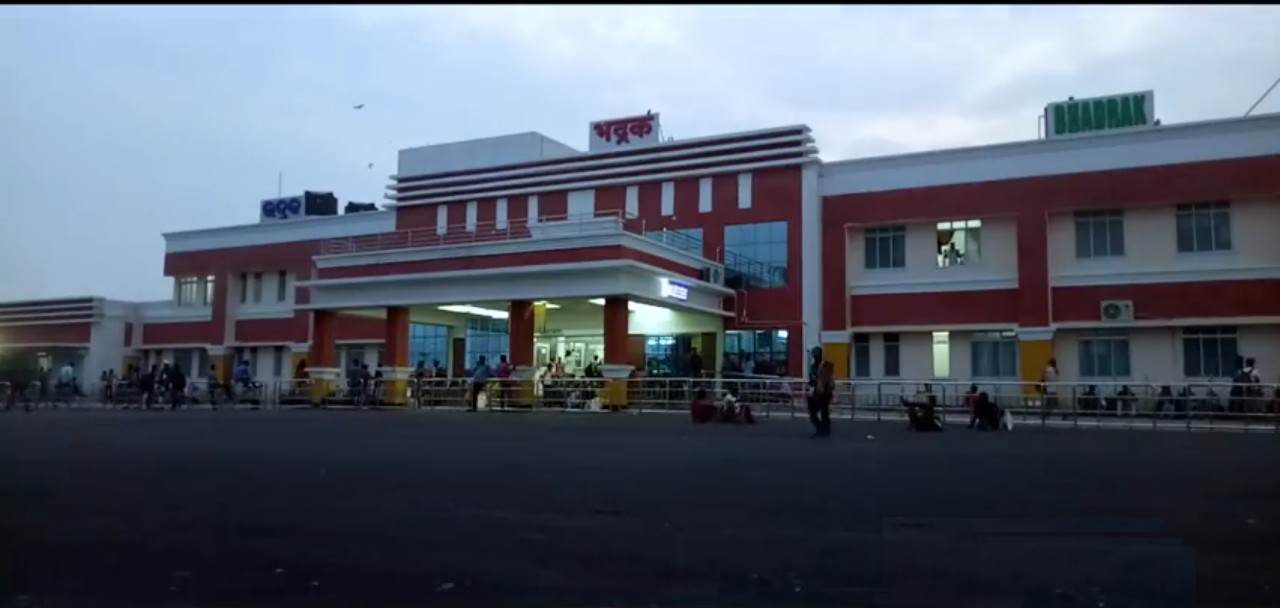
- From Top; Left to Right: Bhadrak City view, Dhamra Port, Akhandalamani Temple and Bhadrak Railway Station

- Location in Odisha, India Bhadrak (India)
- Coordinates: 21°03′36″N 86°30′00″E
- Country: India
- State: Odisha
- District: Bhadrak

Government
  - Type: Municipality
  - Body: Bhadrak Municipality

Area
  - Total: 78.86 km^{2} (30.45 sq mi)
- Elevation: 23 m (75 ft)

Population (2011)
  - Total: 107,369
  - Rank: India 456th, Odisha 9th
  - Density: 1,362/km^{2} (3,526/sq mi)
- Demonym: Bhadrakia

Languages
  - Official: Odia
- Time zone: UTC+5:30 (IST)
- PIN: 756100
- Vehicle registration: OD-22
- Website: bhadrak.nic.in

Bhadrak is a city of Odisha state in eastern India. The city is the district headquarters of Bhadrak district. According to legend, the city derives its name from the Goddess Bhadrakali, whose temple is on the banks of the Salandi River.

== History ==
According to legend, Bhadrak derives its name from the Goddess Bhadrakali, whose temple is situated on the southwest outskirts of the town. It is an ancient land, dating from the age of the Puranas.

Bhadrak's contribution to Odisha's maritime and agrarian prosperity, trade, and commerce throughout the ages is a part of history. In the Mughal period, Bhadrak was a subah, or province, under the Nawabs of Bengal. When the imperial power of the Mughals waned, the area consisted of principalities such as Kanika, Nampo, and Agarapada, with administrative sub-units called chowparhies, all ruled by Kshatriya chiefs.

After the occupation of Odisha by the British in June 1804, Bhadrak constituted one of the two administrative divisions of Cuttack and Balasore. In 1828, when Balasore was made a separate district, Bhadrak became one of its sub-divisions with an assistant magistrate and deputy collector as the sub-divisional head; but the munsif's court remained in Jajpur until 1901.

Bhadrak was at the forefront during the period of national struggle. In 1920, Mahatma Gandhi's non-cooperation movement was launched. In March 1921, Gandhi visited Bhadrak, after being impressed by its nationalistic fervor and fighting spirit. In 1922, he started the rebellion of Kanika which British troops stationed at Bhadrak attempted to suppress; but ultimately the tenants' movement triumphed, under the leadership of Chakradhar Behera, the doyen of Kanika.

When the civil disobedience movement was launched in 1930, Bhadrak became ardent with patriotic zeal, the salt law was defied, and success achieved against the government. Harekrushna Mahatab's role in this success has become cherished in Bhadrak, and a part of the history of modern India. Gandhi, who visited Bhadrak again in 1934, staying in Mahatab's residence at Nuabazar, addressed a meeting of the Harizan workers in Jimbaran Ashram (Nuasahi, Ashram, Garadpur). It was during this time that Banchhanidhi Mohanty of Eram was by his patriotic songs shaping, stimulating, and sensitizing the national consciousness among the people.

Since independence, the history of Bhadrak has been of progress in education, industry, agriculture, trade, and commerce.

== Climate ==
Climate data for Bhadrak, Odisha
| Month | Jan | Feb | Mar | Apr | May | Jun | Jul | Aug | Sep | Oct | Nov | Dec | Year |
|---|---|---|---|---|---|---|---|---|---|---|---|---|---|
| Mean daily maximum °C (°F) | 27.2 (81.0) | 30.0 (86.0) | 34.3 (93.7) | 36.9 (98.4) | 37.1 (98.8) | 34.6 (94.3) | 31.4 (88.5) | 31.3 (88.3) | 31.5 (88.7) | 30.5 (86.9) | 28.9 (84.0) | 27.0 (80.6) | 31.7 (89.1) |
| Mean daily minimum °C (°F) | 14.4 (57.9) | 17.1 (62.8) | 21.4 (70.5) | 24.9 (76.8) | 26.7 (80.1) | 26.3 (79.3) | 25.7 (78.3) | 25.9 (78.6) | 25.6 (78.1) | 23.4 (74.1) | 18.0 (64.4) | 14.3 (57.7) | 22.0 (71.6) |
| Average rainfall mm (inches) | 13 (0.5) | 31 (1.2) | 34 (1.3) | 45 (1.8) | 85 (3.3) | 212 (8.3) | 306 (12.0) | 326 (12.8) | 273 (10.7) | 161 (6.3) | 38 (1.5) | 6 (0.2) | 1,530 (59.9) |
Source: en.climate-data.org

== Transportation ==
Bhadrak City is well connected with the state of Odisha, and to other parts of the country as well. The town lies on National Highway 16, 130 kilometres (81 mi) northeast of Bhubaneswar, the state capital.

Bhadrak City has three bus stop, one on NH 16(New Bus stand/Main Bus Stand), the others near Bant square and Charampa. There are frequent buses to and from Cuttack, Bhubaneswar, Balasore, and Calcutta.

Bhadrak railway station is at Charampa, which is 3 kilometres (1.9 mi) north of Bhadrak city.

The nearest airport is Biju Patnaik International Airport, 145 kilometres (90 mi) southwest, near Bhubaneswar.

The nearest port is Dhamra Port, around 75 kilometers east of the city.

== Demographics ==
Historical population
| Year | Pop. | ±% |
|---|---|---|
| 1901 | 18,581 | — |
| 1911 | 18,578 | −0.0% |
| 1921 | 18,175 | −2.2% |
| 1931 | 18,283 | +0.6% |
| 1941 | 19,550 | +6.9% |
| 1951 | 18,795 | −3.9% |
| 1961 | 25,285 | +34.5% |
| 1971 | 40,478 | +60.1% |
| 1981 | 60,600 | +49.7% |
| 1991 | 76,435 | +26.1% |
| 2001 | 92,515 | +21.0% |
| 2011 | 107,463 | +16.2% |
Source: Census of India

=== Population ===
Religion in Bhadrak
| Religion | Percent |
| Hinduism | 59.72% |
| Islam | 39.56% |

As of 2011, Bhadrak has a population of 107,463. Males constitute 51% (55,090) of the population and females 49% (52,373). Bhadrak has an average literacy rate of 79.49%, higher than the national average of 59.5%; with 83.99% of males, and 74.77% of females, literate. 12% (13,138) of the population is under 6 years of age.

== Politics ==
Bhadrak is part of Lok Sabha Constituency 3 Bhadrak(SC). The present Member of Parliament is Avimanyu Sethi, of the Bharatiya Janta party (BJP).

The current MLA from the Bhadrak assembly constituency is Sitansu Sekhar Mohapatra, of the BJP, who won the seat in 2024. Previous MLAs from this seat were sanjiv Mallick (BJD), who was the MLA for two terms up to 2019; Naren Palei, of the INC, elected in 2004; Biren Palei, INC, in 2000; Prafulla Samal (BJD), who won in 1995 and in 1990; Jugal Kishore Pattanayak, who won in 1985, as a member of the INC, and in 1980, as a member of INC(I); and Ratnakar Mohanty, of JNP, in 1977.

== Education ==
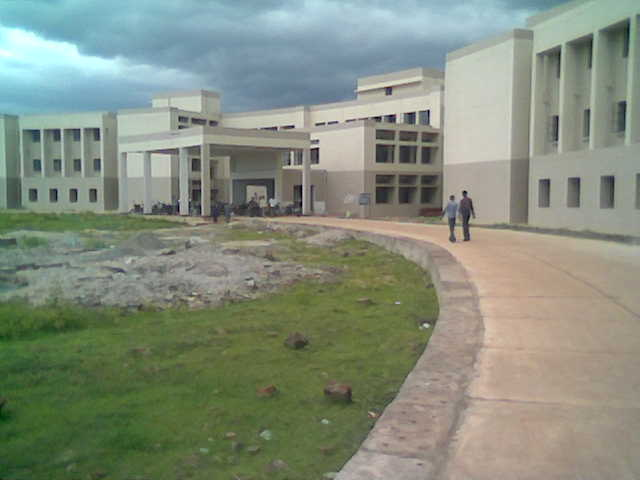
Bhadrak Institute of Engineering and Technology (BIET)

The higher education institutions of the district are the Bhadrak Institute of Engineering and Technology (BIET) and Bhadrak Autonomous College, among others. The Bhadrak Institute of Engineering & Technology (BIET) in Orissa(known as Odisha), India, was established in 1982. It is situated at Barapada, which is 8 km away from sub-district headquarters at Bhadrak Rural. India

There are six new industrial training institutes (ITI) in Bhadrak, whose courses impart technical skill to students.

There are also numerous secondary schools. Bhadrak High School, established in 1882, is one of the oldest schools in Odisha. Dr. Harekrushna Mahatab, first chief minister of Odisha, studied at this school. Schools using English as a medium of instruction include Durga Prasad Saraf Vidyapeeth, Sathya Sai Vidya Vihar School, SBD International School, Jyothi Convent School, Happy Home School, Sunshine Mission School, Carmel School, Kendriya Vidyalaya Bhadrak, and St. Xavier's School.

== Tourism and culture ==
The Akhandalamani Temple, the abode of Lord Siva is located on the bank of the Baitarani River, at Aradi, 37 kilometres (23 mi) from the district headquarters. On the outskirts of the city, 5 kilometres (3.1 mi) southwest, is situated Maa Bhadrakali Temple, whose deity, it is believed, gave the town its name.

In the city itself one can worship and get blessing at Maa Banka Basuli Temple and Baba Lokanath Shiva Temple. Bankabasuli is the oldest temple in Bhadrak. This temple is famous for its serenity and divinity. Durgapuja is the primary function of this temple. It is situated at the heart of Bhadrak near Kacheri Bazar.

Apart from that, the historical places and monuments to visit in the Bhadrak district include several Hindu temples; such as the Maa Santoshi Temple, located in Korkora village; Sri Radha Madanmohan temple; the temple of Akhandalamani; the Kali Puja held at Charampa; Prasanna Khemeswar Mahadev Temple in Anijo village, which is a Shiva temple that has existed for 150 years.

Maa Patana Mangala Temple, Chhatrapada, Ghanteswar

Apart from above there is a famous temple situated at kharida binayakpur under basudevpur block in the name of Aankudeswari Temple.The temple is too much popular in Bhadrak district and every year on the occasion of Maha vishuba sankranti / pana sankranti / vaishakhi there is a festivals conducted by the temple authority for almost 15th days.

There are also Muslim mosques such as the Sufi Saint Mujahid-e-Millat's Shrine (Mazaar) at Dhamnagar. This shrine is also known as Khanquah-E-Habibah. It is the center of an annual celebration called Eid-Miladun-Nabi, which commemorates the prophet Mohammad's birthday.

Other sites in Bhadrak include the Maa Patana Mangala temple and the biggest pond in Odisha.

As a religious hub, Bhadrak is also home to festivals and religious celebrations. The Pana Sankranti held at Chhatrapada from 14 to 21 April is one of the most famous. Dol Purnima or Holi (Melana) is also another major festival; it is celebrated in several locations in Bhadrak. The Cart Festival (Ratha Yatra), on the other hand, is celebrated in Jharpata, Gamal, Hide, Ghanteswar, Totapada, Chhatrapada, Bhadrak, and Bhatia village Sri Jagannath matha. This last location is one of the oldest places which observes Ganesh puja (150 years).

== Notable people ==
- Laxmikanta Mohapatra (18 December 1888 – 24 February 1953) was an Indian Odia poet, writer, performance artist, and freedom fighter. He was born in Talapada, Tihidi Block of Bhadrak District, on 18 December 1888.
- Ananta Charan Sukla, was an Indian scholar of comparative literature, literary criticism, aesthetics, and philosophy.

== See also ==
- 1991 Bhadrak riot
