= Nirmaljhar =

River in Odisha, India

- Location within Odisha
- Location: Ganjam district, Odisha
- Coordinates: 19°36′00″N 85°03′58″E
- Elevation: 13 metres (43 ft)

The Nirmaljhar is a perennial stream in the Ganjam District in the Indian state of Odisha beside the temple of Vishnu. The Nirmaljhar flows from the Badaghati Mountains in the Eastern Ghats. It is at 19.60°N 85.066°E.
