= Odisha Joint Entrance Examination =

Indian state university entrance examination

Odisha Joint Entrance Examination (OJEE) is a state-government controlled centralised test for admission to many private and governmental medical, engineering & management institutions in Odisha. The test is taken after the 12th grade, diploma, graduate degree, postgraduate degree for admission to graduation of lateral entry in B.Tech, lateral entry in B.Arch, B.Pharm, BDS, (also known as Bachelors), MBA, MCA, PDCM, PGDM, M.Pharm, and M.Tech courses. MBBS and B.Tech courses have been removed from OJEE after the announcement of All India Pre Medical Test (AIPMT) and JEE (Main).

The exam is taken by those who studied Pure Science stream in class 12 level with the specific subjects tested in the examination, which are Physics, Chemistry and Biology. Presently it is being conducted only for Engineering colleges due to the announcement of an ALL INDIA COMMON MEDICAL ENTRANCE EXAM (NEET). Earlier there used to be two separate tests for medical colleges and engineering colleges, the difference being that the medical test has the Biology paper while the engineering test has the Mathematics paper.

For those who have Graduate degree, Postgraduate degree may compete for the seat's for MBA, MCA, PGCM, PGDM, M.Pharm & M.Tech courses for various disciplines offered by various university in Odisha.

For session 2015 students aspiring to take admission in Ist year B.Tech and B.Arch in state of Odisha are required to take JEE MAIN conducted by CBSE New Delhi.

Every year approximately 3 lakh people take the examination and it is increasing. Students from Odisha Council of Higher Secondary Education, Odisha, CBSE & ISC board take the test.
