= National Board of Accreditation =

Accreditation agency in India

Coordinates: 28°35′13″N 77°13′40″E

- Abbreviation: NBA
- Formation: 1994; 32 years ago
- Type: Autonomous from 2010
- Headquarters: New Delhi, India
- Chairperson: Prof. Anil D. Sahasrabudhe
- Member Secretary: Dr. Anil Kumar Nassa
- Website: www.nbaind.org

The National Board of Accreditation (NBA) is one of the two major bodies responsible for accreditation of higher education institutions in India, along with the National Assessment and Accreditation Council (NAAC). NBA accredits technical programmes, such as engineering and management programmes, while NAAC accredits general colleges and universities. NBA is a full member of the Washington Accord.

== History ==
NBA was established by the All India Council for Technical Education (AICTE) in 1994 and has operated as an autonomous body since 2010. In 2014 it was granted a full membership status in the Washington Accord.

== Programs accredited ==
The NBA accredits programs rather than institutions. These include diplomas, undergraduate and postgraduate programs. Accredited fields include engineering & technology, management, pharmacy, architecture, applied arts and crafts, computer applications, and hospitality and tourism management.

While accreditation is voluntary, in 2017 the AICTE announced that it would not provide approval to institutes that failed to obtain accreditation for at least half of their programs.

== See also ==
- University Grants Commission (India), a related higher education body
