= Biju Patnaik University of Technology =

Public technical university in Odisha, India

Biju Patnaik University of Technology, Rourkela
- Motto: Yoga Karmasu Kaushālam (Sanskrit)
- Type: Public Technical University
- Established: 21 November 2002; 23 years ago
- Chancellor: Governor of Odisha
- Vice-Chancellor: Amiya Kumar Rath
- Location: Chhend Colony, Rourkela, Odisha, India; 22.247186°N 84.819203°E
- Campus: Urban, 125 acres
- Website: www.bput.ac.in

Biju Patnaik University of Technology (BPUT) is a public state university located in Rourkela, Odisha, India. It was established on 21 November 2002 and was named after Biju Patnaik, former Chief Minister of Odisha.

== History ==
It came into being on 21 November 2002 through the Biju Patnaik University of Technology (BPUT) Act of Government of Odisha. Its foundation stone was laid in 2003 by Dr. A.P.J. Abdul Kalam, then President of India.

The main objective of instituting the university was to ensure a common curriculum and uniform evaluation for Engineering, Management, Pharmacy and Architecture colleges in the states.

It started functioning at its Chhend Colony campus in 2013. Construction of The Centre for Advance PG Studies and Student Complex was completed in 2014.

== Campus ==
The campus of Biju Patnaik University of Technology is located at Chhend Colony, Rourkela in Odisha with an area of 125 acres. It is about 7 km from Rourkela railway station, Odisha. It has its jurisdiction over entire state of Orissa.

== Organisation and administration ==
=== Governance ===
The day-to-day functioning of the university is headed by Vice Chancellor. Prof. Amiya Kumar Rath is the current vice-chancellor of Biju Patnaik University of Technology.

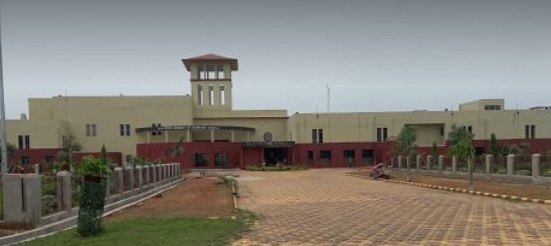
BPUT Admin HQ

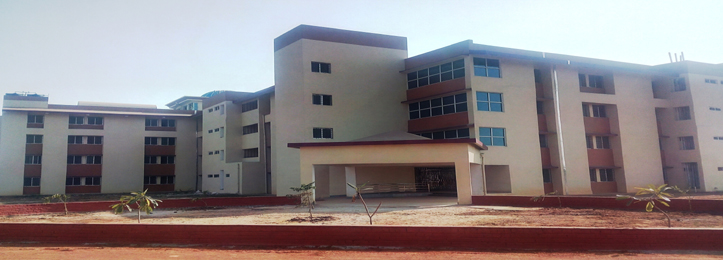
BPUT Hostel

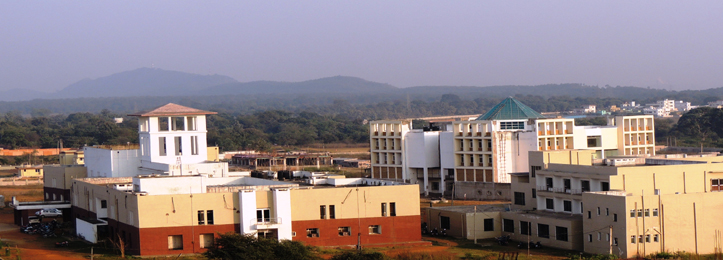
BPUT Campus

== Academics ==
The university and its affiliated colleges and institutions offer undergraduate and postgraduate courses and PhD in different fields like Engineering, Management, Pharmacy, Architecture, Computer Application and Science.

== Affiliated colleges ==
The university has 137 colleges, both constituent and affiliated. Constituent and affiliated colleges include:

- Indira Gandhi Institute of Technology, Sarang
- Parala Maharaja Engineering College, Berhampur
- Government College of Engineering, Kalahandi
- Central Institute of Plastic Engineering and Technology, Bhubaneswar
- College of IT and Management Education, Bhubaneswar

== See also ==
- List of colleges affiliated to Biju Patnaik University of Technology
