= Ama Bus =

Bus transit service in Odisha, India

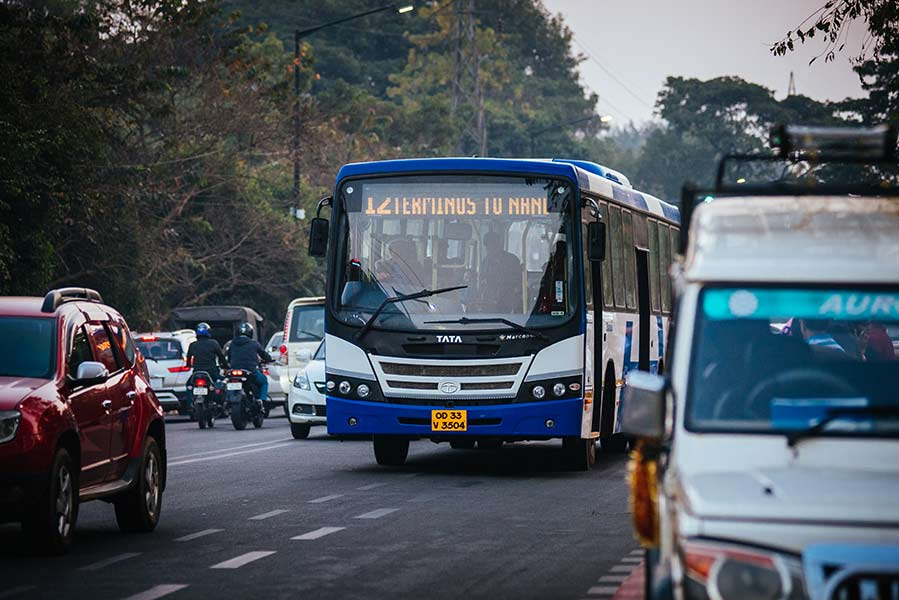
- Air Conditioned Ama Bus with blue colour scheme
- Parent: Comprehensive Region Urban Transport (CRUT)
- Commenced operation: 6 November, 2018
- Headquarters: Plot No. 548/1452, Patia, Kalarahanga, Bhubaneswar, Odisha
- Locale: Bhubaneswar, Cuttack, Khordha, Nimapada, Pipili, Puri, Konark, Rourkela, Sambalpur, Brahmapur, Kendujhar
- Service area: Odisha
- Service type: Intelligent Public Transport System
- Website: capitalregiontransport.in

Ama Bus (Odia: ଆମ ବସ୍‌, romanized: Āmå Bås, lit. 'Our Bus'), formerly known as Mo Bus (Odia: ମୋ ବସ୍‌, romanized: Mō Bås, lit. 'My Bus'), is a public transport bus service run in Odisha. Comprehensive Region Urban Transport (CRUT), formerly known as Capital Region Urban Transport, runs this service. CRUT is a special purpose vehicle formed under the Housing and Urban Development Department of the Government of Odisha. The buses currently operate in Bhubaneswar, Cuttack, Khordha, Nimapada, Pipili, Puri, Konark, Rourkela, Sambalpur, Brahmapur, Kendujhar. The service was inaugurated by the Chief Minister of Odisha, Naveen Patnaik on 6 November, 2018.

== Features ==
The buses are equipped with Wi-Fi, CCTV, GPS, public information display system and on board announcement facility.

The CRUT AMA BUS mobile app, available on Android and iOS, provides several commuter-friendly features such as locations of nearby bus queue shelters, live bus tracking, estimated time of arrival, real-time bus occupancy, online ticketing and pass purchase.

To promote digital payments, CRUT offers 10% discount on digital tickets for all commuters and 15% discount for women. National Common Mobility Card and digital passes enable commuters to travel cashless.

Advanced Driver Assistance System (ADAS) and Driver Fatigue Monitoring System (DFMS) will be installed in the buses to enhance safety.

== Infrastructure ==
=== Bus Queue Shelters ===
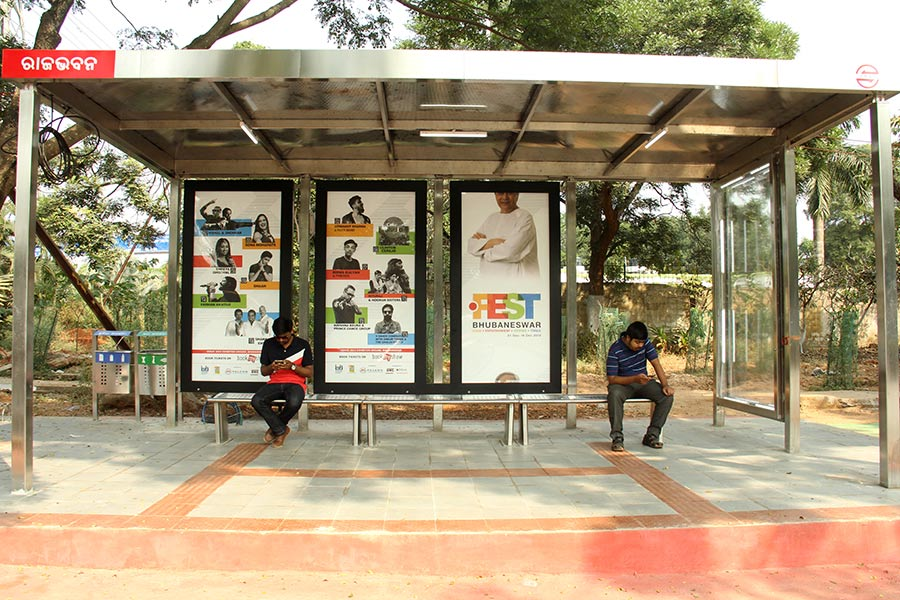
Bus Queue Shelter at Governor House Square

Bus Queue Shelters (BQS) are designated places where buses stop for passengers to board or alight. Each BQS has covered shed to protect passengers against rough weather with polycarbonate semitransparent roof cover, seating arrangements, dustbins, vertical signage posts, back-lit display signage board with location information map and network map. Mounted on some BQS, GPS-based public information system (PIS) shows real-time information on Ama Bus plying on the routes.

=== Automatic Ticket Vending Machines ===
The Automatic Ticket Vending Machines (ATVMs) are equipped to issue tickets with a variety of payment methods, including cash, UPI, and coins, and provide detailed route information.

=== Depots ===
Depots are assigned places in the cities where the maintenance of buses is carried out. Night parking and workshop facilities also from a part of the depots.

=== OD Terminals ===
The origin destination (OD) terminals are state of art bus terminals from where a particular bus route either starts or ends.

== Routes ==
Capital Region (Bhubaneswar, Cuttack, Khordha, Puri)
Route	Terminals		Via
Airport Shuttle	Bhubaneswar Railway Station	Biju Patnaik International Airport	AG Square
AP-BSABT Shuttle	Biju Patnaik International Airport	BSABT	Fire Station Square, OUAT
DD1	Bhubaneswar Railway Station	Shree Mandira Parking, Puri	State Museum, Uttara Square, Pipili Bypass, Sakhigopal
F1	Damana Square	Patia Depot	Sailashree Vihar, Infocity, KIMS Hospital, KIIT Square
F2	Damana Square	Omfed Square	Kelucharan Park, Mancheswar Station, Central Railway Hospital
8	IGKC Hospital	SUM Hospital Campus 2	SUM Hospital, IRC Village, ID Market, Jaydev Vihar Flyover, Rasulgarh Square
9	Bhubaneswar Railway Station	Patia Square	Exhibition Ground, Acharya Vihar Square, Jaydev Vihar Square, CARE Hospital, Utkal Hospital, Niladri Vihar, Infocity, KIMS Hospital, CIPET
10	Biju Patnaik International Airport	Biju Patnaik Park	Jaydev Vihar Square, Nandankanan, Biju Patnaik Park
10E	Biju Patnaik International Airport	Maulana Azad National Urdu University, Cuttack	Jaydev Vihar Square, Nandankanan
11	Trisulia Bus Stand	Bhubaneswar Railway Station	Nandankanan, Acharya Vihar Square
12	Nandankanan	Bhubaneswar Railway Station	Jaydev Vihar Square
13	Nandankanan Botanical Garden	Lingipur	AG Square
13E	Nandankanan Botanical Garden	Dhauli Shanti Stupa	AG Square
14	Kalinga Vihar	Bhubaneswar Railway Station	IGKC Hospital, SUM Hospital, BSABT, OUAT, AG Square
15	CNBT	Utkal Hospital	Judicial Academy, KIIT Square, Infocity, Sailashree Vihar
15E	CNBT	Salia Sahi	Judicial Academy, KIIT Square, Infocity, Sailashree Vihar, Utkal Hospital
16	Bhubaneswar Railway Station	Sri Sri University	Vani Vihar Square, Rasulgarh Square, CNBT, NLUO
16A	Bhubaneswar Railway Station	Naraj Police Outpost	Vani Vihar Square, Rasulgarh Square, CNBT, NLUO
17	Biju Patnaik International Airport	Barabati Stadium	NH
18	BSABT	Jagatpur	Nandankanan
19	AIIMS	Mahanadi Vihar	NH
20	Bhubaneswar Railway Station	Khordha New Bus Stand	Vani Vihar Square
21	Bhubaneswar Railway Station	Khordha New Bus Stand	OUAT, Fire Station Square
22A	Bhubaneswar Railway Station	Khordha Road Station	
22B	Jatani Gate	Khordha New Bus Stand	Jatani
23	Bhubaneswar Railway Station	IGKC Hospital	Fire Station Square, SUM Hospital
24	Kalinga Vihar	Sai Mandir	Rasulgarh Square
24E	Kalinga Vihar	Bainchua	Rasulgarh Square, Sai Mandir
25	Dumduma (Ranasinghpur)	Gadakana	Master Canteen, Mancheswar
26	Dumduma (Jadupur)	Rajdhani Engineering College Rokat	Master Canteen, Rasulgarh Square, Chaikeisiani
27	Bhubaneswar Railway Station	Bhagwanpur	AIIMS
28	Bhubaneswar Railway Station	Trident Galaxy	Kalinga Nagar
29	Bhagwanpur	Sai Mandir	
29E	Bhagwanpur	SBI Colony Kesora	Sai Mandir
30	Bhubaneswar Railway Station	Chatabar (Mahatma Gandhi Academy of Prisons)	SUM Hospital
31	Bhubaneswar Railway Station	Hi-Tech Hospital Square	Toshali Bhawan, Laxmi Sagar
32	BSABT	Lingaraj Temple	Bhubaneswar Railway Station
33	Bhubaneswar Railway Station	Pipili (Danda Mukundapur Bypass)	
34	Bhubaneswar Railway Station	Balakati (Sai Hospital)	
34E	Bhubaneswar Railway Station	Trahi Achyuta Temple	Balakati
35	Bhubaneswar Railway Station	Adaspur (Udayanath College)	Jayadev Pitha
35E	Bhubaneswar Railway Station	Adaspur (Udayanath College)	Sudhananda Group of Institutions, Jayadev Pitha
36	Bhubaneswar Railway Station	Mundali	Judicial Academy
37	BSABT	Naraj Marthapur Railway Station	Trisulia Square, OMFED Dairy
38	Bhubaneswar Railway Station	Trimal	Khordha Bypass, IIT
39	Bhubaneswar Railway Station	AIIMS	Capital Hospital, Bhimatangi
40	AIIMS	SBI Colony Kesora	Capital Hospital, Badagada Brit Colony
41	BSABT	DRIEMS	NH, Link Road, Badambadi, Tangi
42	BSABT	Nandankanan High School	Chandaka
43	BSABT	Banamalipur Medical Chhaka	Rasulgarh Square, Kalpana Square, Balakati, Balipatana
43E	BSABT	Abhayamukhi	Rasulgarh Square, Kalpana Square, Balakati, Balipatana, Banamalipur
44	BSABT	SVNIRTAR Olatpur	Vani Vihar Square, Master Canteen, Kalpana Square, Rasulgarh Square, Nakhara
45	Bhubaneswar Railway Station	Jayadev Pitha	Kalpana Square, Sai Mandir, Brahman Sarangi, Khamanga
46	Bhubaneswar Railway Station	Nandankanan High School	Kalayanpur, Gandarpur
47	IGKC Hospital	SCB Medical College (Settlement Office)	SUM Hospital, Ekamra Kanan, Mayfair, Nandankanan, CNBT
48	Khordha New Bus Stand	Jagatpur	Pitapalli, Chandaka, CNBT
49	Bhubaneswar Railway Station	Delanga Hata	Pipili
50	Bhubaneswar Railway Station	Puri Bus Stand	
51	BSABT	Puri Bus Stand	Rasulgarh Square
52	Puri Bus Stand	Mangalahata Square	Puri Railway Station, Beach Road
53	Malatipatpur Bus Stand	Jagannath Temple, Puri	Puri Bus Stand
54	NLUO	Puri Bus Stand	CNBT, Puri Bypass
56	Khordha New Bus Stand	Puri Bus Stand	Jatani, Pipili
56E	Khordha Road Station	Puri Bus Stand	Jatani, Pipili
57	Puri Bus Stand	Astaranga Block Square	Balighai, Marine Drive, Konark, Kakatpur
58	Jagatpur	Puri Bus Stand	Link Road, Badambadi, Nakhara, Puri Bypass
59	Mahanadi Vihar	Puri Bus Stand	Link Road, Badambadi, Nakhara, Puri Bypass
61	Puri Bus Stand	Satapada Bus Stand	
62	Bhubaneswar Railway Station	Suando (Gopabandhu Janmapitha )	Kalpana Square, Pipili Bypass, Pattanaikia
63	BSABT	Madhabananda Temple, Niali	Vani Vihar Square, Rasulgarh Square, Nakhara, Adaspur
64	Bhubaneswar Railway Station	Jatani Gate	Vani Vihar Square, Gohiria Square, Madanpur, Bagchi Sri Shankara Hospital
65	Bhubaneswar Railway Station	Khordha New Bus Stand	Vani Vihar Square, Wonderla
66	Bhubaneswar Railway Station	Pathargadia Square	Vani Vihar Square, Kelucharan Park, KISS College
70	Bhubaneswar Railway Station	Konark	Nimapada, Gop
71	BSABT	Konark	Rasulgarh Square, Nimapada, Gop
72	Jagannath Temple, Puri	Madhabananda Temple, Niali	
73	Puri Bus Stand	Jagannath Temple, Puri	Medical Square, Collector Office
74	Puri Railway Station	Jagannath Temple, Puri	Puri Bus Stand
75	Jagannath Temple, Puri	Old Bus Stand Kakatpur	Puri Bus Stand, Balighai, Marine Drive, Konark
76	Puri Bus Stand	Sakhigopal Temple	
77	Puri Bus Stand	Nimapada Bus Stand	Balighai, Marine Drive, Konark, Gop
78	Puri Bus Stand	Alarnatha Mandira (Brahamgiri New Bus Stand)	
78E	Jagannath Temple, Puri	Alarnatha Mandira (Brahamgiri New Bus Stand)	
79	Jagannath Temple, Puri	Hotel Swosti Premium	Police Line, SCS College, Kacheri, Swarga Dwar
80	Naraj Police Outpost	DMTI Bazar, Charbatia	NLUO, CNBT, Cuttack Railway Station, SCB Medical College, Choudwar
80E	Naraj Police Outpost	Mangarajpur	NLUO, CNBT, Cuttack Railway Station, SCB Medical College, Choudwar
81	Barabati Stadium	Jagannath Temple, Salepur	SCB Medical College, OMP Square, Jagatpur
82	Biju Patnaik International Airport	SCB Medical College (Settlement Office)	Capital Hospital, Bhubaneswar Railway Station, Vani Vihar Square, Nakhara, Cuttack Railway Station
83	Dhabaleswar Temple	Kandarpur	CNBT, 42 Mouza
83A	CNBT	Kuspangi	Justice Square, Nuapatana
84	Biju Patnaik Park	Madhabananda Temple, Niali	CNBT, Link Road, SVNIRTAR Olatpur, Adaspur
85	CNBT	Gadama	OMP Square, Kandarpur
86	CDA 9 Market Square	DRIEMS	CNBT, Choudwar, Tangi
87	Biju Patnaik Park	Mahanadi Vihar	CDA, Judicial Academy, Link Road
87E	Judicial Academy	Industrial Estate Road, Nuapada	Sati Choura Square, Chahata Ghata, Barabati Stadium, SCB Medical College, OMP Square, Mahanadi Vihar
88	NLUO	SCB Medical College (Settlement Office)	CDA, Judicial Academy, Dolamundai, Professor Pada
89	SCB Medical College (Settlement Office)	Jagadguru Krupalu University	
89A	SCB Medical College (Settlement Office)	Judicial Academy	
90	Khordha New Bus Stand	Jagatpur	NH
91	BSABT	Biju Patnaik Park	NH
92	IGKC Hospital	Sai Mandir	Khandagiri, Lingaraj Station, Bhimtangi, Capital Hospital, Kalpana Square
93	Bhubaneswar Railway Station	Biju Patnaik Park	Fire Station Square, SUM Hospital, Kateni
94	BSABT	SIEP, Jatni	Khandagiri, Tamando, Jatni Gate, Khordha Road Station
95	Khordha New Bus Stand	Trimetro, Kalibati	DRDA, OCC Chhaka, Bhubaneswar College of Engineering

Rourkela
Route	Terminals		Via
100	Rourkela New Bus Stand	Rourkela Airport	Ring Road, Ispat General Hospital, Chhend Colony, Birsa Munda Hockey Stadium
101	Rourkela New Bus Stand	Laukera	Udit Nagar, Hanuman Vatika Chowk, Chhend Colony, Rourkela Airport
101E	Rourkela New Bus Stand	Panposh Railway Station	Udit Nagar, Hanuman Vatika Chowk, Chhend Colony
102	Vedvyas Swarga Dwara	Jhirpani	Vedvyas Chowk, Panposh Chowk, Chhend Colony, Koel Nagar
103	Rourkela New Bus Stand	Panposh	Udit Nagar, Hanuman Vatika Chowk, Chhend Colony
104	Rourkela New Bus Stand	Jhirpani	Sector 2, NIT, Jagda Chowk
105	Rourkela New Bus Stand	Rajgangpur	NH
106	Rourkela New Bus Stand	Birmitrapur Hanuman Temple	Ring Road, NH
107	Rourkela New Bus Stand	Teterkela	Bondamunda, Bisra
108	Rourkela New Bus Stand	Nuagaon Block Office	Jagda Chowk, Jhirpani, Khuntagaon
109	Rourkela New Bus Stand	Lathikata	NH
110	Rourkela New Bus Stand	Kalunga Bus Stand	Raghunathpali
111	Rourkela New Bus Stand	Bonaigarh	
112	Rourkela New Bus Stand	Lahunipara Bus Stand	
113	Rourkela New Bus Stand	Ushra Chowk	NH
114	Rourkela New Bus Stand	Nuagaon	Hatibari
115	Rourkela New Bus Stand	Potab	Hatibari
116	Rourkela New Bus Stand	Loram	NIT, Jagda Chowk, Khutagaon, Sorda
117	Rourkela New Bus Stand	Jaraikela	Bondamunda, Bisra
118	Rourkela New Bus Stand	Salangabahal	Kuarmunda, Biramitrapur
119	Rourkela New Bus Stand	Kutra	Rajgangpur Bypass
120	Rourkela New Bus Stand	Gurundia Bus Stand	Disco Chowk, Soldega
121	DAV Pond	Kantajhor	Basanti Colony, Rourkela New Bus Stand, NIT
122	Shaktinagar	Tarapur Filter House	NIT Main Gate, IG Park, ISPAT Chowk, Judicial Court, Panposh Chowk, IDL Chowk
124	Rourkela New Bus Stand	Hamirpur	Malgodown, Basanti Colony, Chhend Colony, Ispat General Hospital

Sambalpur
Route	Terminals		Via
200	Sambalpur City Railway Station	Sambalpur Junction Railway Station (Khetrajpur Railway Station)	Sambalpur Bus Terminal (Ainthapali), Budharaja Temple, Modipara Chowk
201	Ainthapali Bus Terminal	Ghanteswari Temple	Remed Chowk, Hirakud Railway Station, Goshala, GC CRPF, Sainik School, Chiplima
202	Ainthapali Bus Terminal	Golgunda Village Road	Laxmi Talkies, Collector Office, Samaleswari Temple, VSSUT, Burla Medical Chowk, Sambalpur University, Atal chowk
203	Ainthapali Bus Terminal	Hirakud Dam	Remed Chowk, Hindalco Chowk
204	Ainthapali Bus Terminal	Maneswar Chowk	Laxmi Talkies, Zilla School, Dhanupali Chowk, RTO Office
205	Ainthapali Bus Terminal	Nuagujatal	Remed Chowk, Hirakud College, Hirakud School
206	Samleswari Temple	Ghanteswari Temple	District Court, Jail Chowk, Chaunrpur Chowk, Jampali Road, Snehapali Road
207	Ainthapali Bus Terminal	Dhama College	Sindurpank, NSCB College, Dhanupali Chowk, Huma Temple
208	Mahavir Road	Sambalpur University Jyoti Vihar	NSCB College, Govt. Women's College, Ainthapali Bus Terminal, Remed Chowk, Burla Bus Stand
209	Sambalpur Junction Railway Station (Khetrajpur Railway Station)	Odisha State Open University	Samleswari Temple, District Court, Jail Chowk, Chaunrpur Chowk, Goshala, IIM Sambalpur
210	Ainthapali Bus Terminal	Jamadarpalli Dyke	Kainsir, Jogipali Chowk, Jamadarpalli
211	Ainthapali Bus Terminal	Jharsuguda New Bus Stand	Bhalupali Chowk, Badriprasad Institute, Police Station Rengali, Shyam Metalic, Lapanga, Thelkholi, Sahapada, MCL Auditorium
212	Ainthapali Bus Terminal	Baragarh Government Bus Stand	Remed Chowk, Sambalpur Diary, Godbhaga Railway Station, Attabira Chowk, Barahagoda Chowk
213	Ainthapali Bus Terminal	Belapahar	Bhalupali Chowk, Badriprasad Institute, Police Station Rengali, Rengali Chowk, Karpabahal Chowk
214	Ainthapali Bus Terminal	Kuchinda Bus Stand	Sambalpur City Railway Station Square, Padarpara Chowk, Parmanpur Bus Stand, Charbhati Chowk, Jarli Chowk, Kuchinda College
215	Ainthapali Bus Terminal	Padiabahal Chowk	Sambalpur City Railway Station Square, Shree Ram Vatika, Nildunguri Toll Plaza, Goudapali

Berhampur
Route	Terminals		Via
300	Duduma Colony New Bus Stand	NIST College	Amba Market, Gandhi Nagar, Khallikote College, Bijipur, Golanthra
301	Berhampur Railway Station	Sitalapali Square	Courtpeta Square, MKCG Medical College, Ambapua, City College, SUM Hospital - Berhampur, Parala Maharaja Engineering College
302	Berhampur Railway Station	Regidi Chowk	
303	Duduma Colony New Bus Stand	Gopalpur Bus Stand	Amba Market, Gandhi Nagar, Khallikote College, Courtpeta Square, MKCG Medical College, Ambapua, Mandiapalli, Berhampur University
303E	Duduma Colony New Bus Stand	Dhabaleswar Temple	Amba Market, Berhampur Railway Station, Lanjipalli, Ankuli, Pathara, Army AD
303A	Duduma Colony New Bus Stand	TCP 1	Amba Market, Berhampur Railway Station, Lanjipalli, Ankuli, Pathara, Army AD
304	Berhampur Railway Station	D Patapur	
304E	Berhampur Railway Station	Ralaba	
305	Haladiapadar New Bus Stand	Chatrapur Old Bus Stand	
306	Mahatma Gandhi Stadium	Sonapur Beach	Khallikote College, Bijipur, Kanisi Hata, Golanthra, Sidhha Bhairavi Temple
307	Duduma Colony New Bus Stand	Engineering School Chowk	Amba Market, Gandhi Nagar, Khallikote College, Courtpeta Square, MKCG Medical College
308	Duduma Colony New Bus Stand	Berhampur Railway Station	City Hospital
309	Government ITI	IISER	
311	Rambha Railway Station	Chatrapur New Bus Stand	
312	Gopalpur Bus Stand	Chatrapur New Bus Stand	
313	Gopalpur Bus Stand	Chatrapur New Bus Stand	
314	Duduma Colony New Bus Stand	Chatrapur New Bus Stand	
315	Sonapur Beach	Chatrapur New Bus Stand	
316	Shyamalai Temple	Chatrapur New Bus Stand	
317	Tara Tarini Main Gate	Chatrapur New Bus Stand	
318	Regidi Chowk	Chatrapur New Bus Stand	

Keonjhar
Route	Terminals		Via
400	Government Hospital Suakati	Rimuli Highway	Sanaghaghara Park, King's Palace, District Hospital, BSNL Chowk, Collectorate Circle, Labanya Bus Stand, RTO Office, Mandua, Naranpur
401	DDU Campus	Regional College Babartaposi	Nihal Singh Chaka, Gandhi Chowk, Serajuddin Chowk, Karanjia Bus Stand
402	Sanaghaghara Park	Chaka Nua Sahi	Nihal Singh Chaka, Gandhi Chowk, Collectorate Circle, Labanya Bus Stand, Govindapur
403	DDU Campus	District Hospital	King's Palace, KV, Mandua, RTO Office, BSNL Chowk
404	Mausimaa Temple	Dharanidhar Medical College	District Hospital, Collectorate Circle, Gandhi Chowk, Serajuddin Chowk, DD University
405	Mausimaa Temple	Jhumpura Police Station	District Hospital, Collectorate Circle, Joda Barbil Bus Stand, Raisuan, OSISL Chowk, Jhumpura Bus Stand
406	DDU Campus	Dharanidhar Medical College	Keonjhar Fire Station Road, Gandhi Chowk, DD University

== Awards ==
Award	Year	Category/Event	Organisation Conferring
City With Best Public Transport System	2024	17th Urban Mobility India Award	Ministry of Housing and Urban Affairs; Government of India
Best Urban Transport Project	2023	16th Urban Mobility India Award	Ministry of Housing and Urban Affairs; Government of India
Integrated and Resilient Urban Transport	2023	3rd Urban Infra Business Summit & Awards	Ministry of Housing and Urban Affairs; Government of India
Sustainable Transport Award Honourable Mention	2023	Public Transport	Institute for Transportation and Development Policy
Most Innovative Bus Transit System in India	2022	Transit & Mobility	Urban Infra Group
Best Urban Transport Projects Implemented	2022	15th Urban Mobility India Award	Ministry of Housing and Urban Affairs; Government of India
Best Urban Transport Project Implemented	2022	Smart Solutions Challenge & Inclusive Cities Awards 2022	National Institute of Urban Affairs; United Nations (India)
Promoting Gender-Responsive Services	2022	United Nations Public Service Awards 2022	United Nations
Best Urban Transport Project Implemented	2021	14th Urban Mobility India Award	Ministry of Housing and Urban Affairs; Government of India
Corona Warrior Samman	2021	Exemplary and Inspiring Services during COVID-19	Prelude Novel Ventures
Smart Special Purpose Vehicle (SPV)	2021	Smart Cities India Awards 2021	Smart Cities India Expo
Innovations Undertaken in Urban Transport during COVID-19	2020	13th Urban Mobility India Award	Ministry of Housing and Urban Affairs; Government of India
Corporate Leadership Award 2020	2020	Consumer Connect	My City Links
Marketing Campaign of the Year	2020	Brand Leadership Award Odisha 2020	Prelude Novel Ventures
Best City Bus Service Project	2019	12th Urban Mobility India Awards	Ministry of Housing and Urban Affairs; Government of India
