= Bhubaneswar Metro =

Proposed rapid transit system in India

Coordinates: 20.378645°N 85.799424°E

Overview
- Owner: Government of Odisha
- Locale: Bhubaneswar and Cuttack
- Transit type: Rapid Transit
- Number of lines: 1 (Proposed, Planned)
- Number of stations: 20 (Proposed, Planned)
- Key people: Kalyana Patnaik (Chief Executive Officer); Prasanna Kumar Sarangi (General Manager - Administration); Sonam Khandelwal (Company Secretary)
- Website: bhubaneswarmetro.in

Operation
- Train length: 3-Coach Train Set

Technical
- System length: 26.024 km (16.171 mi)

The Bhubaneswar Metro is a proposed rapid transit system for the twin cities of Bhubaneswar and Cuttack in Odisha, India. In the first phase, a 30 km (19 mi) metro trunk route will be created from SCB Medical College in Cuttack to the Biju Patnaik International Airport in Bhubaneswar.

== History ==
On 27-July-2010, the state transport department said that it had asked Delhi Metro Rail Corporation (DMRC) to conduct a survey on the possibility of connecting Bhubaneswar and Cuttack by metro rail. On 08-January-2013, E. Sreedharan, principal advisor of Delhi Metro Rail Corporation (DMRC), said that a metro rail was unsuitable for Bhubaneswar, because it was more suited for cities with more than 2 million in population. He suggested that Bhubaneswar should invest in bus rapid transit system or high speed tramway system instead. Subhash Singh, then conveyor of Cuttack Banchao Committee, wrote multiple petitions on the same and urged the authorities to reconsider the same keeping in mind population growth in next 50 years. Mr.Singh said " Bhubaneswar, Cuttack and Puri are emerging cities with great potential to become the center of health, sport, manufacturing, technology and tourism in eastern India. Metro project to connect these cities will boost the economic activities of the region and further more will be instrumental in overall socio-economic development of the state".

On 09-January-2013, Engineering Projects India Ltd. gave a proposal to the state government about a monorail project between Cuttack and Bhubaneswar. On 23-August-2014, the state government signed a contract with Balaji Railroad Systems Ltd. (BARSYL) for preparation of a detailed project report for a mass rapid transit system (MRTS) between Bhubaneswar and Cuttack covering 30 km. BARSYL would get ₹2.52 crore for preparation of the plan to be submitted in ten months.

In January 2013, E. Sreedharan stated that Bhubaneswar is not ready yet for metro rail citing its low population. Orissa Chief Secretary Aditya Prasad Padhi stated in February 2017 that there was no immediate feasibility for a metro rail system in Bhubaneswar, and a bus rapid transit system would be developed instead.

In January 2018, Odisha CM demanded for Metro rail connectivity between Cuttack and Bhubaneswar. also in June 2019, Governor of Odisha said that the state government will attempt to connect the heritage silver city of Cuttack with smart city Bhubaneswar by Metro train.

In April 2023, Odisha Chief Minister Naveen Patnaik approved the proposal for the metro train service between Cuttack, Bhubaneswar, Khordha, and Puri. Odisha CM directed the Housing and Urban Development Department to complete the DPR on a war-footing for the project, which is entirely funded by the Government of Odisha.

In August 2023, Delhi Metro Rail Corporation was engaged with the responsibility of preparing the DPR. After conducting traffic survey, geo-technical investigation, topo-graphic survey, environmental & social impact assessments, DMRC completed the DPR preparation and submitted to Odisha Chief Secretary Pradeep Kumar Jena.

== Construction Phases ==
=== Phase 1 ===
In Phase 1, 20 metro stations may or may not be built on the Line 1 from Trisulia to Biju Patnaik Airport, including Capital Hospital, Sishu Bhawan, Bapuji Nagar, Bhubaneswar Railway Station, Ram Mandir Square, Vani Vihar, Acharya Vihar Square, Jaydev Vihar Square, Xavier Square, Rail Sadan, District Centre, Damana Square, Patia Square, KIIT Square, Nandan Vihar, Raghunathpur, Nandankanan Zoological Park, Barang Station and Phulapokhari. which would be further extended to Cuttack Netaji Bus Terminal in future expansion.

Phase 1 Network
No.	Line Name	Stations	Length (km)	Terminals		Opening Date
1	Line 1	20	26.024 km (16.171 mi)	Trisulia (Cuttack)	Biju Patnaik Airport (Bhubaneswar)	TBD

== Timeline ==
- April 2023: Metro project announced for Bhubaneswar, Cuttack, Khordha, and Puri. First metro trunk route proposed, connecting Trisulia near Cuttack to Biju Patnaik International Airport in Bhubaneswar.
- May 2023: DPR at last stage of preparation. Government announces that metro construction will start by December 2023.
- July 2023: BMRCL in cooperation with DMRC said the soil testing for Bhubaneswar metro would be commenced soon. In the first phase, soil testing will take place between Trisulia and Nandankanan and then the testing will be done till Airport. Soil will be tested every 1 km and digging of 30 m pits maybe required to check the natural and bedrock of soil.
- August 2023: Delhi Metro Rail Corporation (DMRC) was engaged with the responsibility of preparing the DPR. After conducting traffic survey, geo-technical investigation, topo-graphic survey, environmental & social impact assessments, DMRC completed the DPR preparation and submitted to Chief Secretary Pradeep Kumar Jena. A total of 20 stations on a route of 26 kilometers will be constructed, i.e. Biju Patnaik Airport, Capital Hospital, Bapuji Nagar, Bhubaneswar Railway Station, Ram Mandir Square, Vani Vihar, Acharya Vihar, Jaydev Vihar Square, Xavier Square, Rail Sadan, District Centre, Damana Square, Patia Square, KIIT Square, Nandan Vihar, Raghunathpur, Nandankanan Zoological Park, Barang Station, Phulapokhari and Trisulia Square in Cuttack.
- October 2023: Odisha Chief Minister has approved DPR of the metro project.
- January 2024: Chief minister of Odisha, Naveen Patnaik, inaugurated foundation stone of the project on new year.
- March 2024: Delhi Metro Rail Corporation floated tenders for all 19 elevated metro stations.
- March 2025: Odisha State Housing and Urban Development Minister announces Metro Rail project extension upto Cuttack city.
- July 2025: Odisha's BJP Government scrapped the tender with Delhi Metro Rail Corporation due to viability concerns.
- April 2026: On 5 April, the Odisha Government scrapped the Metro project citing feasibility challenges from non-compliance with the 2017 National Metro Rail Policy with respect to below-threshold traffic demand and low ridership projections. Although a week later on 10 April, the Odisha State Housing and Urban Development Minister said the Government has put the project on hold indefinitely until the formulation of a comprehensive mobility plan for the capital region.

== See also ==
- Urban rail transit in India
- Mo Bus
- Bhubaneswar
- Cuttack
- Khordha
- Puri
