= Bhubaneswar City Bus =

Bus transit service in Bhubaneswar, Odisha, India

Ama Bus is the primary public transport bus service in Bhubaneswar, Odisha.

Public transport bus service in Bhubaneswar was previously run in public–private partnership between Bhubaneswar-Puri Transport Service Limited (BPTSL) and Dream Team Shahara (DTS). The service was launched on 10 October 2010.

In 2018, Bhubaneswar-Puri Transport Service Limited (BPTSL) became Capital Region Urban Transport (CRUT). CRUT launched Ama Bus on 6 November 2018.

== See also ==
- Ama Bus
- Dream Team Shahara
