= Dream Team Shahara =

Bus operator in Bhubaneswar, Odisha, India

DTS Odisha
- Parent: Dream Team Shahara
- Founded: 16 April, 2010
- Commenced operation: 10 October, 2010
- Defunct: 6 November, 2018
- Headquarters: N-5/538, 2nd & 3rd Floor, SBI Building, IRC Village, Nayapalli, Bhubaneswar, Odisha
- Locale: Bhubaneswar, Cuttack, Khordha, Puri
- Service area: Odisha
- Service type: Public transport bus service
- Alliance: Bhubaneswar-Puri Transport Service Limited (BPTSL)
- Routes: 19
- Fleet: 150
- Daily ridership: 60,000
- Chief executive: Sudhanshu Jena
- Website: Official website at the Wayback Machine (archived 2018-10-06)

Public transport bus service in Bhubaneswar, Odisha was previously run in public–private partnership between Bhubaneswar-Puri Transport Service Limited (BPTSL) and Dream Team Shahara (DTS) under Jawaharlal Nehru National Urban Renewal Mission. A fleet of 150 buses covered all major destinations across the city and also provided connectivity to Cuttack, Puri and Khordha. The service was launched on 10 October, 2010. In 2018, Bhubaneswar-Puri Transport Service Limited (BPTSL) became Capital Region Urban Transport (CRUT). CRUT launched Ama Bus on 6 November, 2018.

== Depots ==
- Central Depot - Master Canteen
- Baramunda Bus Depot

== Routes ==
Route (Name)	Terminal A	Terminal B	Fleet	Fleet Strength
171	Master Canteen	Puri	Tata Motors	5
171 AC	Master Canteen	Puri	Tata Motors	4
207	Nandankanan Zoological Park	Raj Mahal	Tata Motors	10
225	Prasanti Vihar	Sai Temple	Swaraj Mazda	9
234	Master Canteen	Khordha	Tata Marcopolo	5
306	KIIT University	Kalpana Square	Tata Motors	10
315	Hi-Tech Medical College & Hospital, Bhubaneswar	Mayfair Bhubaneswar	Tata Motors	6
324	Biju Patnaik Park (Cuttack)	Master Canteen	Swaraj Mazda	10
333	Lingaraj Temple	Ghatikia	Swaraj Mazda	11
405	Dumduma	VSS Nagar	Swaraj Mazda; Tata Marcopolo	11
414	Biju Patnaik Park (Cuttack)	Master Canteen	Tata Motors	10
423	Dumduma	Chakeisiani	Swaraj Mazda; Tata Marcopolo	3
504	Biju Patnaik Park (Cuttack)	Baramunda	Tata Motors	10
522	Institute of Medical Sciences and Sum Hospital	Master Canteen	Swaraj Mazda; Tata Marcopolo	7
531	All India Institute of Medical Sciences, Bhubaneswar	Master Canteen	Swaraj Mazda; Tata Marcopolo	7
603	Sai Temple	Kalinga Vihar	Tata Motors	10
711 AC	Master Canteen	Puri	Tata Motors	4
801	Khordha	Master Canteen	Swaraj Mazda; Tata Marcopolo	12
810	Khordha	Master Canteen	Tata Marcopolo	6
