= Subhash Singh (disambiguation) =

Subhash Singh or Subash Singh may refer to

- Subhash Singh (Bihar politician)
- Subhash Chandra Singh, Odisha politician
- Subhash Singh, football player
