= Alekh Kumar Parida =

Indian actor

- Born: Alekh Kumar Parida; 16 December 1999 (age 26); Bhubaneswar, Odisha, India
- Education: B.Tech in Computer Science
- Alma mater: Siksha 'O' Anusandhan
- Occupations: Music producer, Actor
- Years active: 2017–present
- Parents: Sudhakar Parida (father); Bhagyabati Parida (mother)
- Website: alekhkumar.com

Alekh Kumar Parida (born 1999) is an Indian actor and music producer. He had worked for Super Singh as Raghav. He recently joined hands with other musical artists for his new song. He launched Tycoon Record Bhakti, a music label for devotional songs.

== Early life and education ==
Alekh Kumar Parida was born to Sudhakar Parida and Bhagyabati Parida in Bhubaneswar on 16 December 1999.

He has completed a bachelor's degree in computer science at ITER, Siksha 'O' Anusandhan in Bhubaneswar.

== Career ==
He produced a music video which featured Chris Gayle, a Jamaican cricketer in the song Living Di Life.

== Discography ==
Year	Song name	Worked as	Label
2024	Whisky Beer & Swing	Singer	Tycoon Records
2023	Criminal	Singer	Tycoon Records
2020	Living Di Life	Producer	Chris Gayle-Universe
