= Babasaheb Bhimrao Ambedkar Bus Terminal =

Inter State Bus Terminal in Bhubaneswar, India

Bhubaneswar ବରମୁଣ୍ତା ବସ ଷ୍ଟାଣ୍ତ
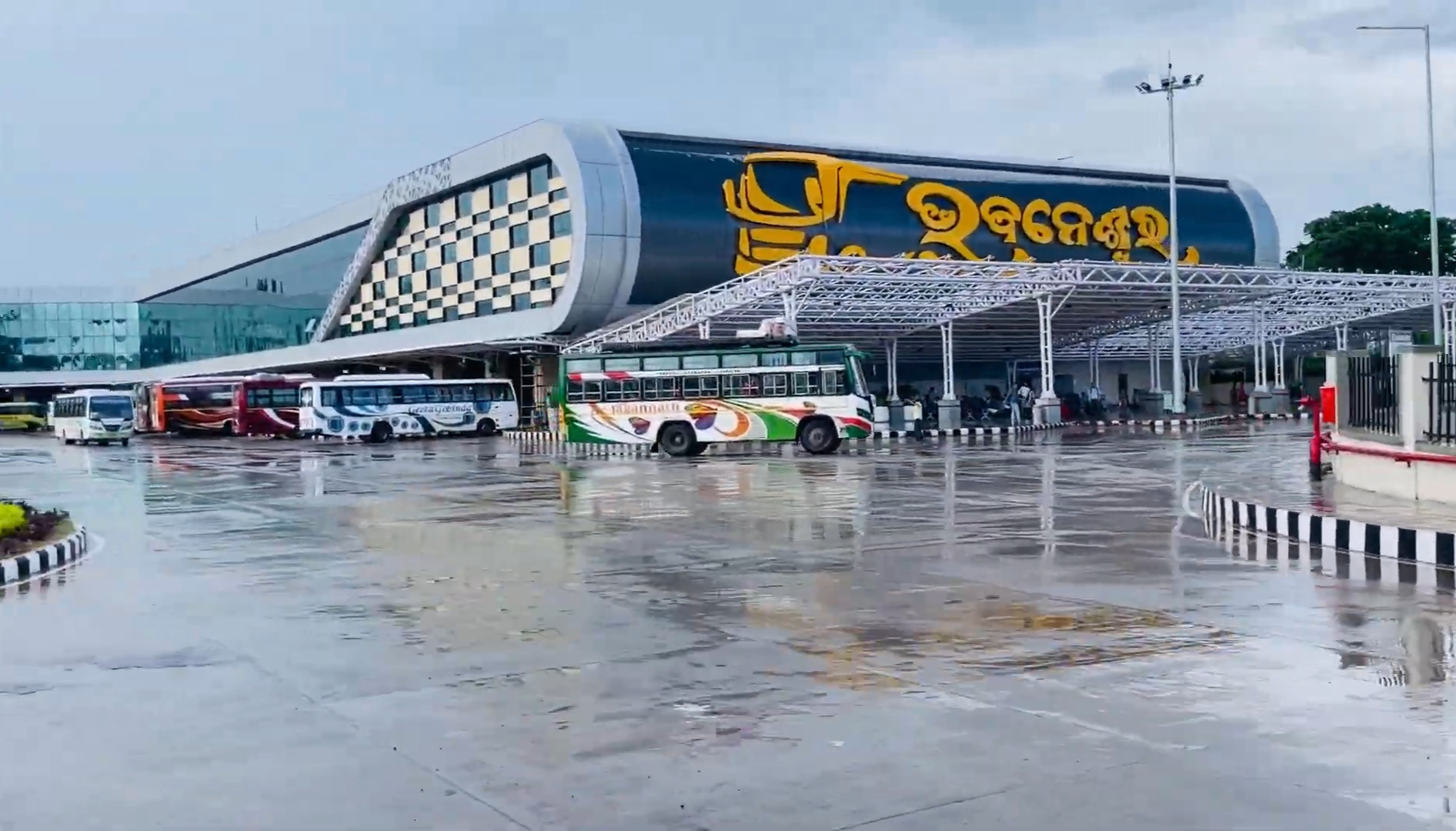

General information
- Location: Baramunda, Bhubaneswar-751003; Odisha; India
- Coordinates: 20.27°N 85.84°E
- System: ISBT
- Owner: Government of Odisha
- Platforms: 44
- Bus operators: OSRTC
- Connections: Ama Bus

Construction
- Parking: Yes

Other information
- Website: bsabt.odisha.gov.in

History
- Opened: October 2023
Location
- Location within Odisha Location within India

Babasaheb Bhim Rao Ambedkar Bus Terminal (BSABT) or Baramunda ISBT or Baramunda Bus Stand is a hi-tech bus stand in Bhubaneswar, Odisha. Baramunda ISBT is the largest bus terminal in Odisha.

== Terminal ==
Inaugurated in March 2024, the terminal has a total built-up area of 28,124.56 square metres (302,730.2 sq ft) and is spread across three floors excluding 5,130 square metres (55,200 sq ft) of basement area. The terminal's ground floor is spread across an area of 9,449 square metres (101,710 sq ft) whereas the first floor is spread across an area of 9,226 square metres (99,310 sq ft). Constructed at a cost of ₹ 210 crores, the terminal premises has provision for 100+ auto-rickshaw and 20+ taxi parking spaces along with space for 85+ two-wheeler parking. The stilt floor has 20 parking slots each for private cars and bikes. With a capacity to cater 30,000 passengers and 700-800 buses on a daily basis, the terminal has a total of 44 active bus bays, 5 bus bays reserved for Ama Bus services, and 111 bus bays for idle parking.

== Amenities ==
- BSABT Wellness Centre by AMRI Hospital
- Operations Control Centre
- Conference Room
- Facility Management Office
- Bus Owners' Association Office
- OSRTC Office
- OSRTC Ticket Counters
- OTDC Travel Desk
- Cloak Room
- Baby Feeding Room
- 130 Kiosks/Shops

=== Eateries ===
- State-of-the-Art Aahaar Kendra
- Utkal Aroma by OTDC
- Misson Shakti Café
- ORMAS and Koraput Coffee
