= Cuttack Municipal Corporation =

Local civic body in Kataka (Cuttack), Odisha, India

Kataka Municipal Corporation

Type
- Type: Municipal Corporation

History
- Founded: 4 June 1876 (as Municipality); 15 August 1994 (as Corporation)

Leadership
- Mayor: Subhash Chandra Singh
- Deputy Mayor: Damayanti Majhi
- Municipal Commissioner: Kirandeep Kaur Sahota, IAS

Structure
- Seats: 59
- Political groups: Government (38): BJD (38); Opposition (8): INC (8); Others (13): BJP (7); IND (6)

Elections
- Voting system: First-past-the-post voting
- Last election: 2022
- Next election: 2027

Motto
- Dedicated To Public Service

Meeting place
- Biju Bhaban, Choudhury Bazaar, Kataka

Website
- cmccuttack.odisha.gov.in

The Kataka Municipal Corporation (KMC), formerly the Cuttack Municipal Corporation (CMC), is the municipal corporation governing the city of Kataka in the Indian state of Odisha. It was established as a municipality on 4 June 1876 and was upgraded to a municipal corporation on 15 August 1994. In June 2026, the Government of Odisha officially changed the anglicised name of the city and its civic body from Cuttack to Kataka to align with the name's phonetic Odia pronunciation.

The corporation administers an area of 192.5 square kilometres (74.3 sq mi) with a population of 610,189, according to official census records. It is responsible for providing essential civic amenities and urban infrastructure, including the maintenance of 783 kilometres (487 mi) of roads, 1,729 kilometres (1,074 mi) of drainage, street lighting, public health dispensaries, and municipal schools.

The Kataka Municipal Corporation is divided into 59 administrative wards. Each ward elects a councillor to the corporation for a five-year term. The civic body is headed by the Mayor, who serves as the political head, while executive powers are vested in the Municipal Commissioner, an Indian Administrative Service (IAS) officer appointed by the state government. Subhash Chandra Singh is the current mayor and the first to be directly elected to the position. Damayanti Majhi serves as the deputy mayor, and Kirandeep Kaur Sahota is the municipal commissioner.

== History and Administration ==
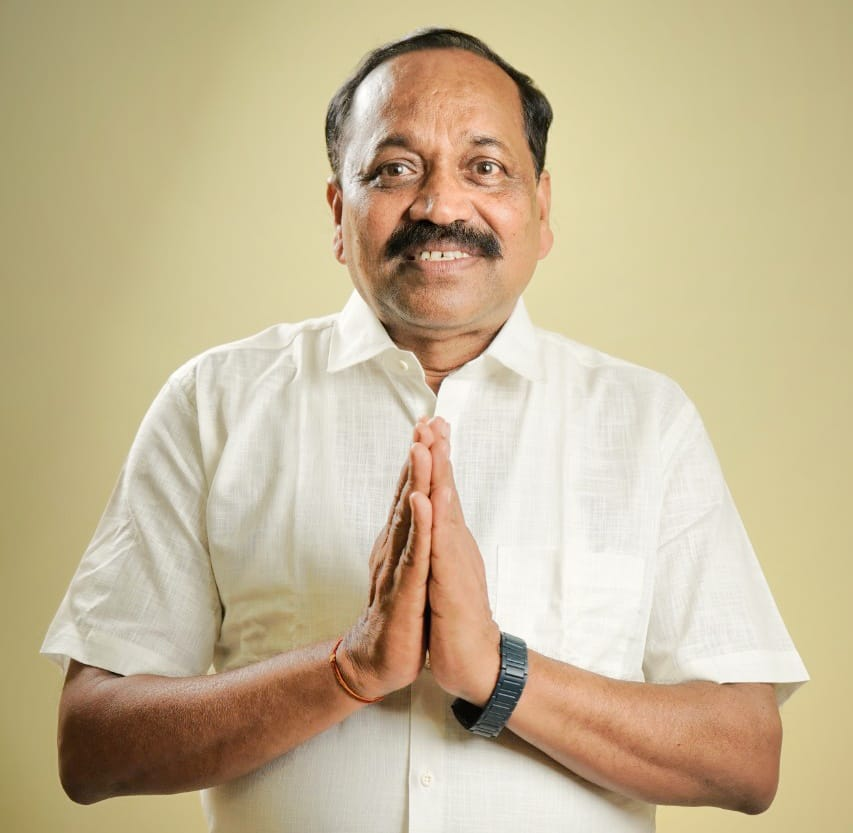
Mr. Subhash Singh, the first directly elected mayor of the Municipal Corporation of Cuttack.

Municipal Corporation of Cuttack was formed to improve the infrastructure of the town as per the needs of the local population. Municipal Corporation of Cuttack has been categorised into 59 wards and each ward is headed by a councillor, for which elections are held every five years.

Municipal Corporation of Cuttack is governed by mayor Mr. Subhash Singh and administered by the municipal commissioner .

== Functions ==
Municipal Corporation of Cuttack was created for the following functions:

- Planning for the town including its surroundings which are covered under its Department's Urban Planning Authority.
- Approving construction of new buildings and authorising use of land for various purposes.
- Improving of the town's economic and social status.
- Arranging water supply for commercial, residential and industrial purposes.
- Planning for fire contingencies through fire service departments.
- Creating solid waste management, public health system and sanitary services.
- Developing ecological aspects, such as the development of urban forestry and creating guidelines for environmental protection.
- Working for the development of weaker sections of society including the mentally and physically handicapped, elderly and gender biased people.
- Making efforts to improve slums and end poverty in the town.

== Revenue Sources ==
The following are the income sources for the corporation from the Central and State Government.

=== Revenue from Taxes ===
Following is the tax-related revenue for the corporation:

- Property tax
- Profession tax
- Entertainment tax
- Grants from Central and State Government, like the goods and services tax
- Advertisement tax

=== Revenue from Non-Tax Sources ===
Following is the non-tax-related revenue for the corporation:

- Water usage charges
- Fees from documentation services
- Rent received from municipal property
- Funds from municipal bonds
