= Adaspur =

Adaspur ଅଡ଼ସପୁର (Odia)
- Village
- Location in Odisha, India Adaspur (India)
- Coordinates: 20.222113°N 86.011169°E
- Country: India
- State: Odisha
- District: Cuttack
- Block: Kantapada

Government
  - Type: Odisha Government
- Elevation: 20 m (66 ft)

Population (estimated 2023)
  - Total: 8,000
- Time zone: UTC+5:30 (IST)

Adaspur is a village in the Kantapada block of Cuttack district, Odisha, India, known for the Baraha Nrusingha Temple. The village is connected by State Highway 60 (SH-60) and is home to the Udayanath College of Science and Technology. Its population is approximately 8,000 as of 2023.

== History ==
Historically known as "Ardharasapura" or "Attahasapur," it was part of the Prachi civilisation in eastern Odisha.

According to local tradition, the Somavamshi dynasty constructed the Baraha Nrusingha Temple in the 9th century AD, and the temple was later destroyed during an Islamic invasion. The temple was rebuilt by residents between 1910 and 1920.

== Geography ==
Adaspur is located at 20.222113°N 86.011169°E, at an elevation of 20 meters above sea level, in the Kantapada block of Cuttack district. It is 29 km from Bhubaneswar, Odisha's capital, and 70 km from Puri. It is close to Nimapada, Jagatsinghpur, Astaranga, and Konark.

The village lies along the Prachi River.

== Infrastructure ==
=== Education ===
Udayanath College of Science and Technology was established in 1987 and provides undergraduate and post-graduate teaching facilities.

=== Transport ===
State Highway 60 (SH-60) passes through Adaspur, linking it to Bhubaneswar, Puri, and Konark. Vehicles in Odisha use the registration code "OD."

== Demographics ==
Adaspur’s population is estimated at 8,000 as of 2023.

The primary language is Odia, and the village is governed by the Government of Odisha.
