= Amit Banerjee (academic) =

Indian surgeon and academic

- Citizenship: Indian
- Education: Maulana Azad Medical College (MBBS, MS in General Surgery, M. Ch in Cardiothoracic Surgery)
- Occupations: Academic Administrator, Professor, Healthcare Specialist, Cardiothoracic Surgeon
- Employer: Siksha 'O' Anusandhan University
- Title: Chancellor, Siksha 'O' Anusandhan University

Amit Banerjee is an Indian cardio-thoracic surgeon, academician and university administrator. He is the Chancellor of Siksha 'O' Anusandhan University. He was formerly Vice-Chancellor of the West Bengal University of Health Sciences (WBUHS) (2011–2014) and Siksha 'O' Anusandhan University, Bhubaneswar (2015–2019), Pro-Chancellor, SOA University (2020–2023), Director-Professor and head of CTVS Maulana Azad Medical College Delhi, Head of the Department of Surgery, Delhi University (2009–2010).

== Life and career ==
Amit Banerjee graduated, completed his MBBS (1971), MS in general surgery (1977) and Master of Surgery (cardiothoracic surgery) (1980) from the Maulana Azad Medical College, New Delhi.

He was a professor at Delhi University, head of cardiothoracic surgery at Jawaharlal Institute of Postgraduate Medical Education and Research (JIPMER), Puducherry. He is credited with establishing open heart surgery and a post-doctoral training centre in JIPMER. From 1992 to 2004, he served as professor at Govind Ballabh Pant Hospital, New Delhi, where he was later appointed director-professor of cardiothoracic surgery in 2004. Later he took on the role of the VC at West Bengal University of Health Sciences.

He is the founding editor of The MAMC Magazine SPANDAN and the MAMC Wall Magazine; editor of JIPMER Scientific Bulletin; and editor, Indian Journal of Thoracic and Cardiovascular Surgery. He is also a reviewer, editorial board member, and advisor of various national and international journals. He has published more than 150 research papers, authored several book chapters on the specialty field.

== Awards ==
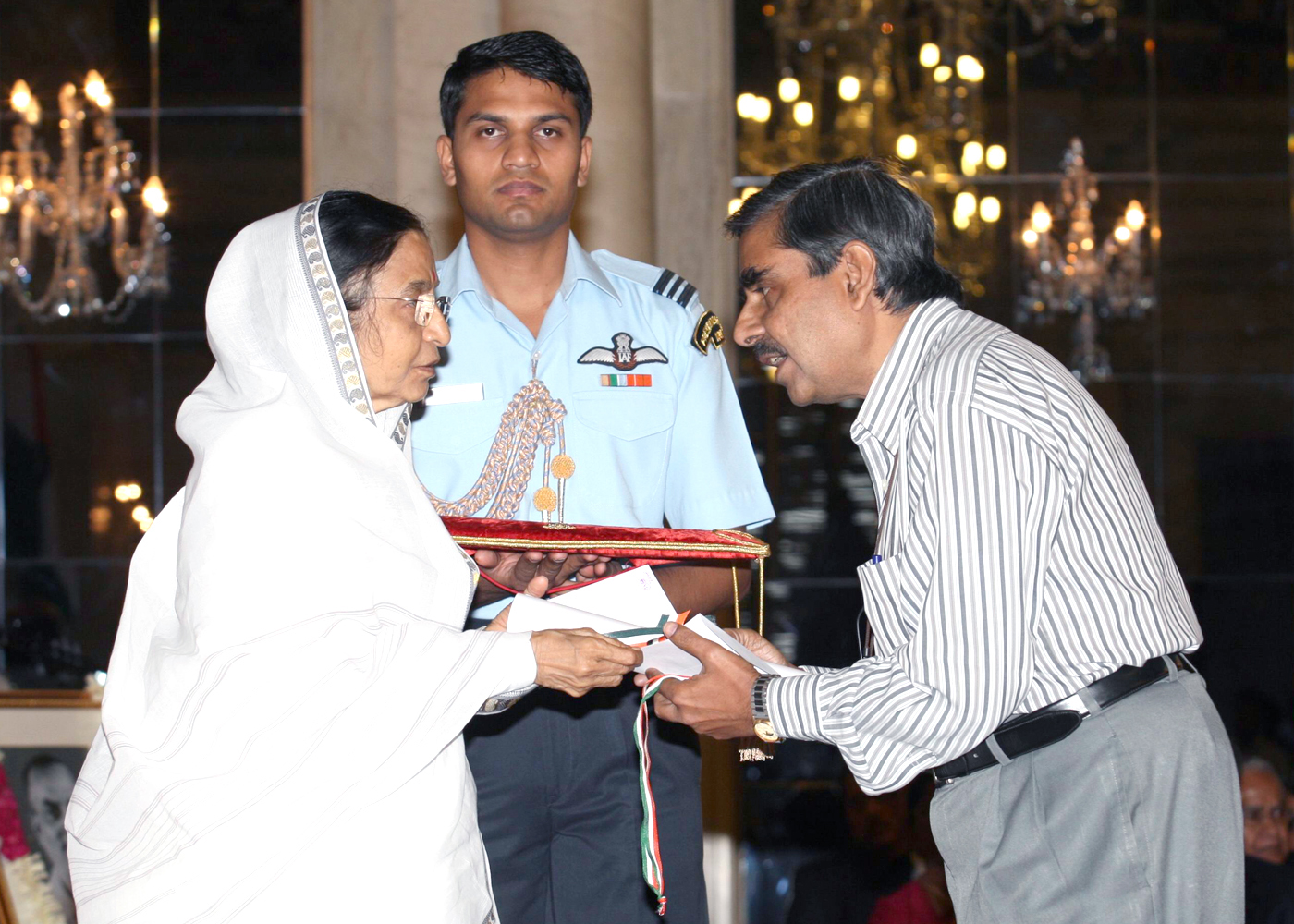
Indian President Pratibha Patil presents the Dr. B.C. Roy National Award 2007 to Amit Banerjee, at Rashtrapati Bhavan in New Delhi on July 01, 2008

He is a recipient of Dr BC Roy Award (received from the President Pratibha Patil). He also received Distinguished Alumnus' Award.
