= Chhend Colony =

- Neighbourhood
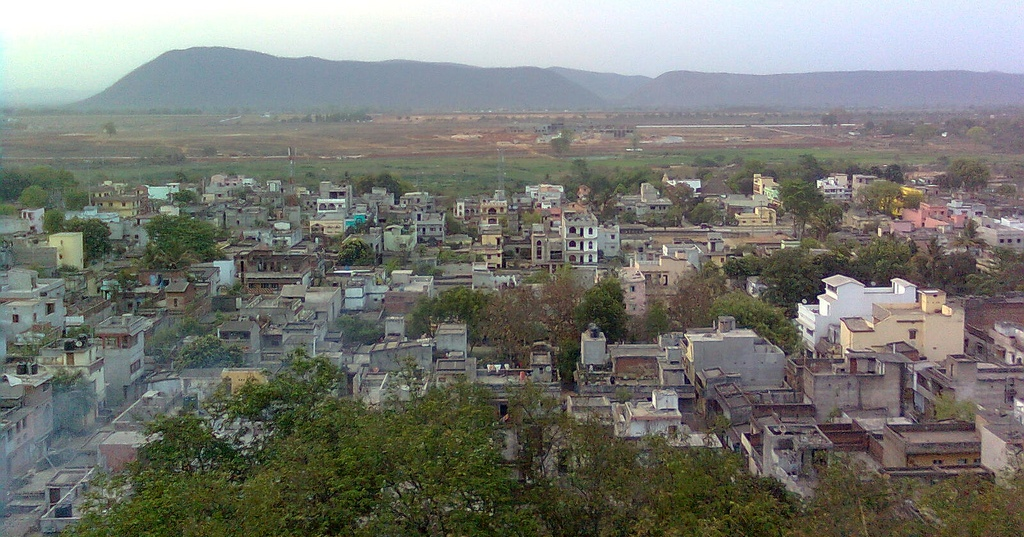
- Nickname: Chhend
- Location in Odisha, India
- Coordinates: 22.24°N 84.83°E
- Country: India
- State: Odisha
- District: Sundargarh

Area
  - Total: 24 km^{2} (9.3 sq mi)
- Elevation: 219 m (719 ft)

Population (2010)
  - Total: 350,000
  - Density: 90/km^{2} (230/sq mi)

Languages
  - Official: Odia
- Time zone: UTC+5:30 (IST)
- PIN: 769015
- Telephone code: +91 661
- Vehicle registration: OD-14(OR-14 before 2012)

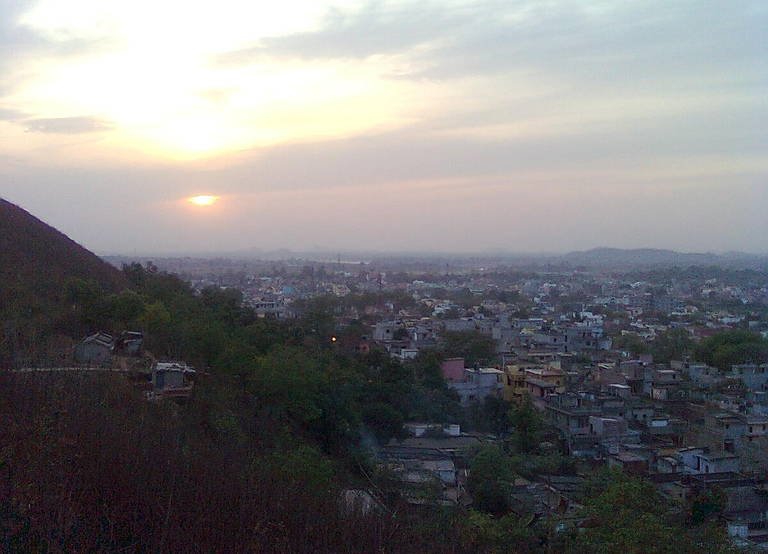
Chhend Colony Sunset view

Chhend Colony is a mixed income group commercial-cum-residential area in the Western Region of Rourkela city, in Sundergarh district. Chhend Colony of Rourkela is situated in Trans Urban area of Rourkela. It is one of the largest colony of India in terms of area.

== Overview ==
Chhend Colony comprises Kalinga Vihar, Gopabandhu Nagar, and Madhusudan Nagar and is close to Rourkela Airport and Rourkela Steel Plant. The area is famous for the private residential plot's and Rourkela Institute of Management Studies, Pharmacy College of Kanak Manjari Institute of Pharmaceutical Sciences and Universities of Biju Patnaik University of Technology. The area is one of the most populous colony of the Rourkela city with a population of around 3.5 lakhs.

== Residential colonies ==
- Phase 1.
- Phase 2.
- Phase 3.
- Kalinga Vihar.
- Gopabandhu Nagar.
- Madhusudan Nagar.
- TISCO Colony.
- Saraswati Colony.
- Kalyani Nagar.
- Co-Operative Colony.
- Kaushalya Vihar.
- Kishan Tola.
- Chhend Basti.
- RDA Colony.
- Pradhanpalli.
- New Bank Colony.
- OPTCL Colony.

== Education ==
- Biju Patnaik University of Technology
- Rourkela Institute of Management Studies
- Kanak Manjari Institute of Pharmaceutical Sciences
- Chinmaya Vidyalaya EM School
- Utkalmani Gopabandhu Institute of Engineering, Rourkela
- J. P. Motion Pictures, Rourkela.
- Government ITI, Rourkela
- Hrushikesh Ray Mahavidyalya
- St. Thomas English School, Kalinga Vihar

== Nearest Transport Means ==
Stations	Distance
Rourkela Railway Station	10 km
Rourkela City Bus Stand	8 km
Panposh Railway Station	4 km
