= Baramunda =

Neighbourhood in Bhubaneswar, India

Baramunda is a locality in Bhubaneswar city in Odisha, India. Its postal head office is at Suryanagar (Khorda).

== Geography ==
Baramunda is a locality situated in the west of the New Capital, Bhubaneswar. It is surrounded by famous localities Surya Nagar, Irc Village, Jagamara, Nayapalli, and Gopabandhu Nagar.

=== Transport ===
Lingaraj Temple Road Rail Way Station is one of the nearest railway stations in Baramunda situated at a distance of 7.5 kilometres (4.7 mi).

== ISBT project ==
A hi-tech bus stand is being developed in Baramunda by The Bhubaneswar Development Authority (BDA) on 15.5-acre (6.3 ha) piece of land. The bus depot at Khandagiri is also part of the project, with a capability of 300 parking spaces.
