= Niali =

Town in Odisha, India

- Town
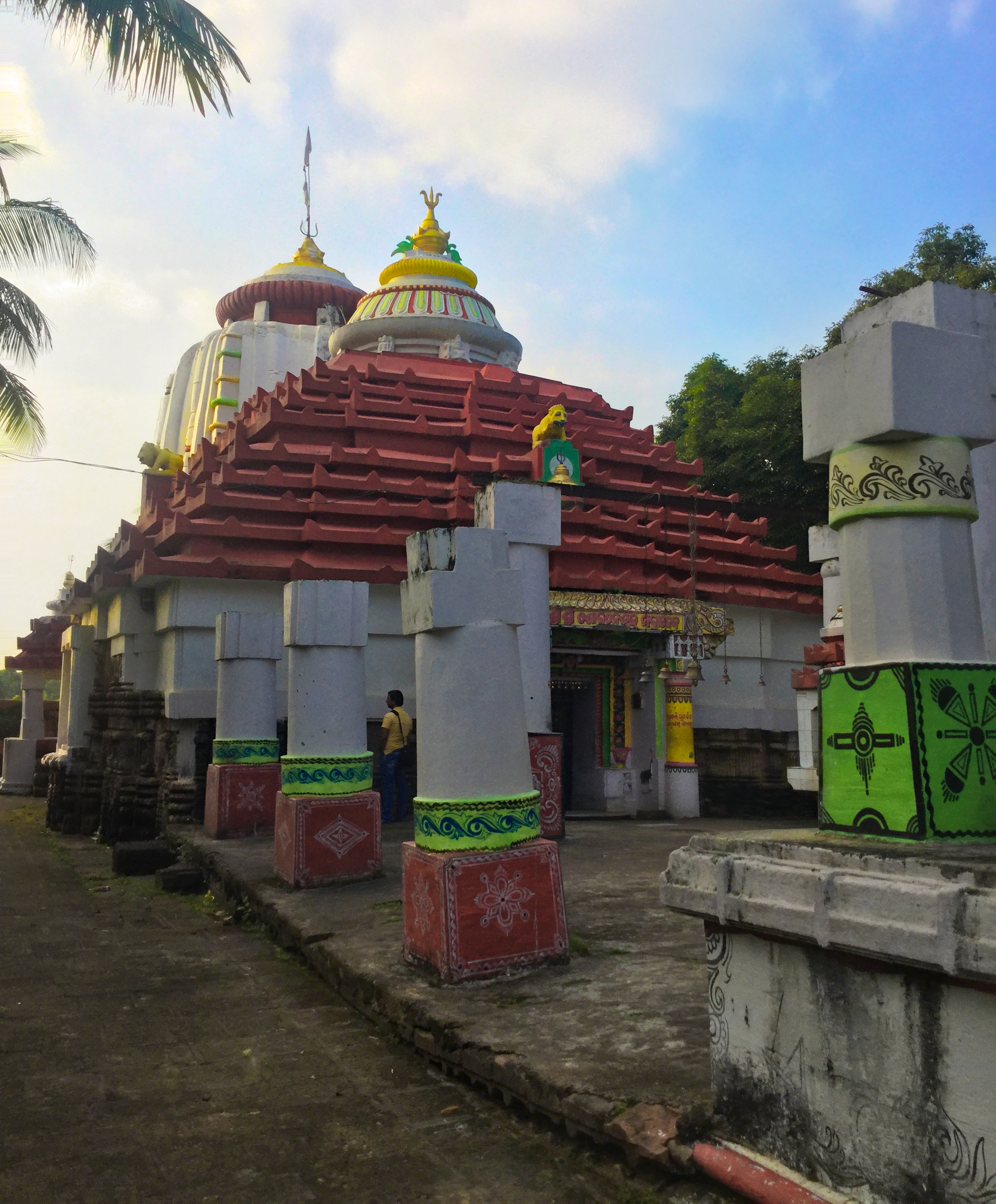
- Sobhaneswara Temple at Niali

- Location within Odisha Location within India Location within Asia
- Coordinates: 20°08′11″N 86°03′33″E
- Country: India
- State: Odisha
- District: Cuttack

Government
  - Body: Niali N.A.C.
  - Chairman: vacant
  - Executive officer: vacant

Languages
  - Official: Odia, English
- Time zone: UTC+5:30 (IST)
- Vehicle registration: OD
- Ethnicity: Odia people
- Climate: Aw (Köppen)
- Avg. summer temperature: 45 °C (113 °F)
- Avg. winter temperature: 10 °C (50 °F)
- Website: odisha.gov.in

Niali is a town and Notified Area Council in Cuttack district in the Indian state of Odisha.

On 24 February 2024, the Government of Odisha upgraded Niali village to be a NAC.
