= National Institute of Urban Affairs =

Research institute in New Delhi, India

The National Institute of Urban Affairs (NIUA) is an institute for research, training and information dissemination in urban development and management in New Delhi, India. It was established in 1976 as an autonomous body under the Societies Registration Act. The Institute is supported by the Ministry of Urban Development, Government of India, State Governments, urban and regional development authorities and other agencies concerned with urban issues

The Institute's policies and directions are determined by the Governing Council consisting of a President, who is appointed by the Government of India, two Vice-Presidents, three members of the Government of India in their ex officio capacity, twelve other members, and the Director, the Chief Executive of the Institute, as the member-secretary.

== Objectives ==
The Institute's Memorandum of Association defines the following main goals:

- To act as an autonomous, scientific and research organisation to undertake, promote and coordinate studies on urbanisation
- To act as a centre for advanced study of urban problems and to provide and promote the necessary training and research facilities
- To evaluate the social, administrative, financial and other aspects of the implementation of urban development plans and programmes
- To mobilise available expertise in the field of urban affairs and to offer and co-ordinate technical and consultancy services
- To constitute or cause to be constituted or give affiliation to regional, state or local centres to promote the purpose of the institute
- To organise and sponsor training courses, workshops and seminars in various fields
- To act as a clearing house of information, and to operate a documentation centre and disseminate information on urban affairs
- To undertake and facilitate publication and distribution of books, research papers, monographs, a journal and other communication material pertaining to urban affairs.
