= Tata Marcopolo =

Joint venture company involved in manufacturing of buses and coaches

Tata Marcopolo Motors Ltd.
- Type: Subsidiary
- Industry: Automotive
- Founded: 2008; 18 years ago
- Headquarters: Marcopolo Manu Unit, Karnataka, India
- Area served: India
- Products: Fully built buses and coaches
- Revenue: 1.699
- Owner: Tata Motors
- Number of employees: 3200

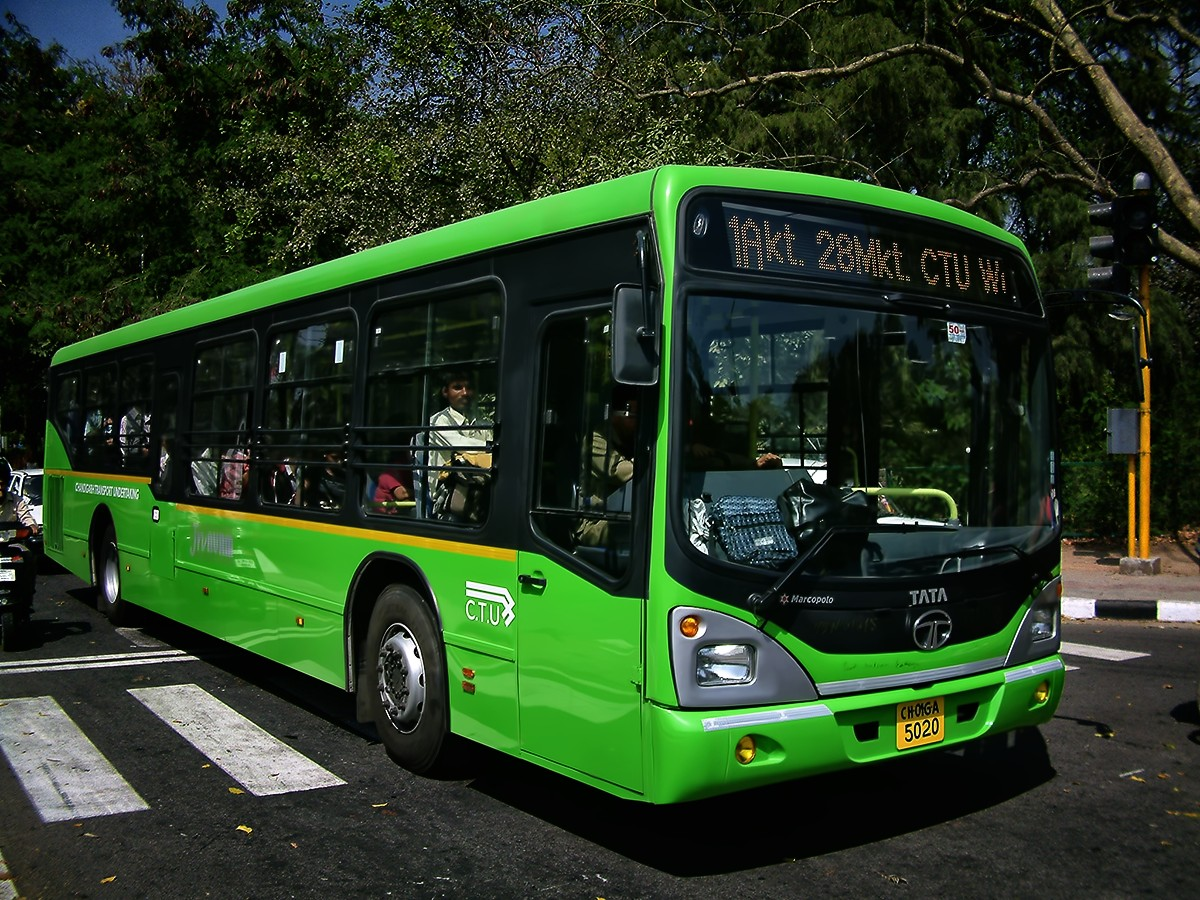
A Tata Marcopolo bus in Chandigarh, India.

Tata Marcopolo (officially Tata Marcopolo Motors Ltd.) is a bus and coach manufacturing company with headquarters in Karnataka, India.

It was incorporated as a joint venture between Tata Motors and Marcopolo S.A. In December 2020, Marcopolo and Tata Motors came to an agreement, whereby Tata Motors would purchase the 49 percent stake held by Marcopolo in the bus-making joint venture for ₹100 crore, bringing curtains to the 14-year old partnership and paving the way for a smooth exit for the Brazilian company. The deal was completed on 29 August 2022. The deal allowed Tata Motors to continue using the ‘Marcopolo’ trademark for a minimum of three years with a non-compete provision in India for a corresponding period.

== Operations ==
The primary bus manufacturing and building unit started in Lucknow, Uttar Pradesh, with an output of 8 buses per day. A second production facility is at Dharwad, Karnataka, and this facility can produce up to 30,000 buses per year. Tata Marcopolo buses were seen at Bus World exhibitions too, and it was able to capture the attention of customers and viewers. 9/12m electric buses have been launched by Tata Marcopolo.

== Sales ==
The company received 300 bus orders from some state governments of India, each bus costing around ₹1 crore.Tata Marcopolo buses are being used in several Indian cities as part of the local transport fleets like Navi Mumbai, Ahmedabad, Delhi, Jaipur, Bengaluru, Coimbatore, Mysuru, Kolkata, Chennai, Lucknow, Kanpur, Chandigarh, Pune, Nagpur, Mumbai, Madurai, Naya Raipur, Indore, Hyderabad, Thane, Thiruvananthapuram, Visakhapatnam, Vijayawada, Amritsar, Amaravati, etc. It is a low-floor bus with both air-conditioned and non air-conditioned variants available.

== Gallery ==
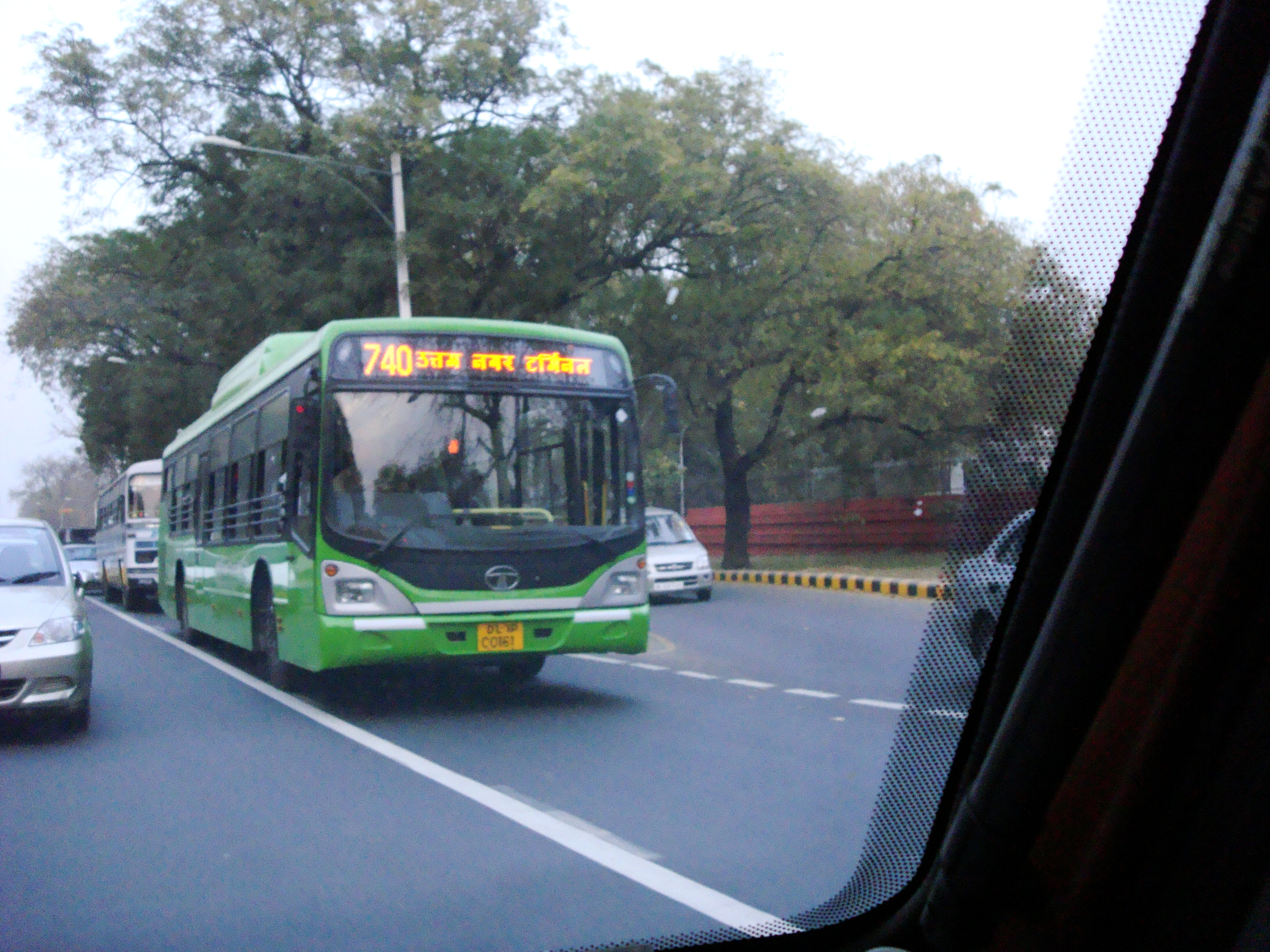
Tata Marcopolo CNG bus in Delhi, India

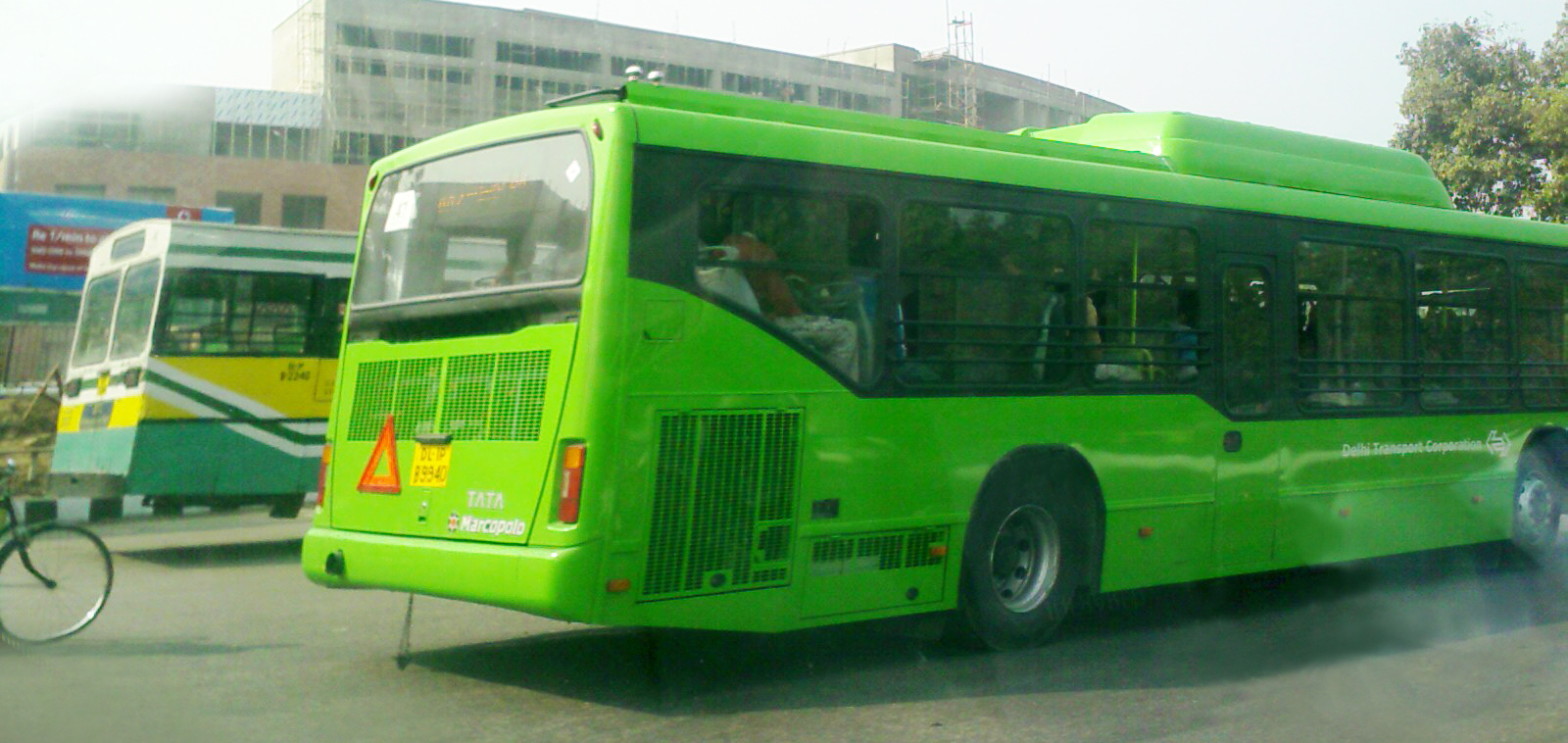
Tata Marcopolo DTC bus and older Tata DTC bus side by side rear view

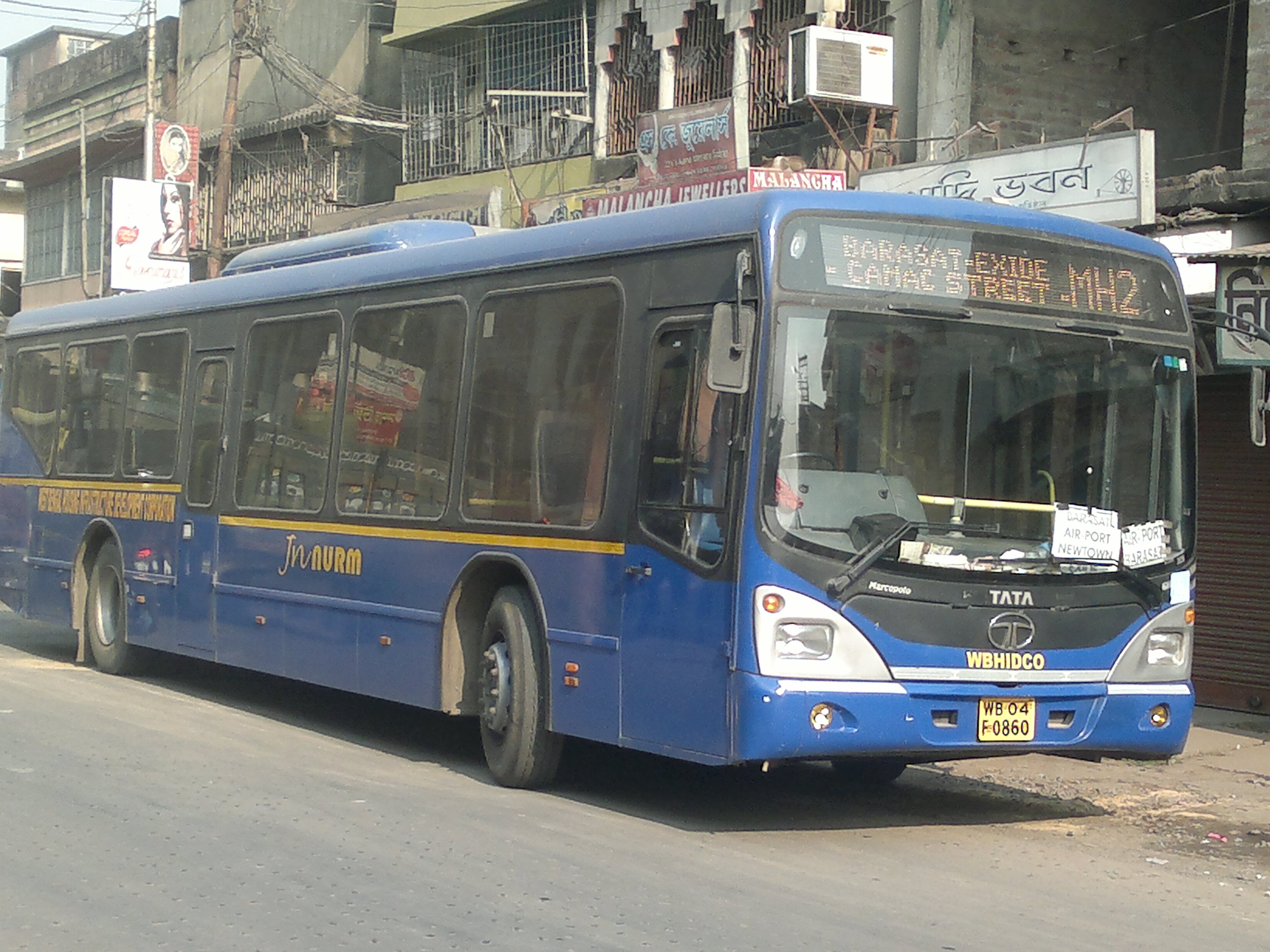
WBHIDCO AC Tata Marcopolo purple series bus in Kolkata

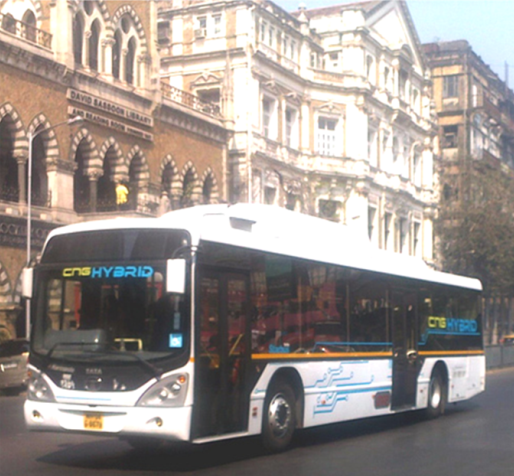
A Tata Marcopolo CNG hybrid bus in Mumbai

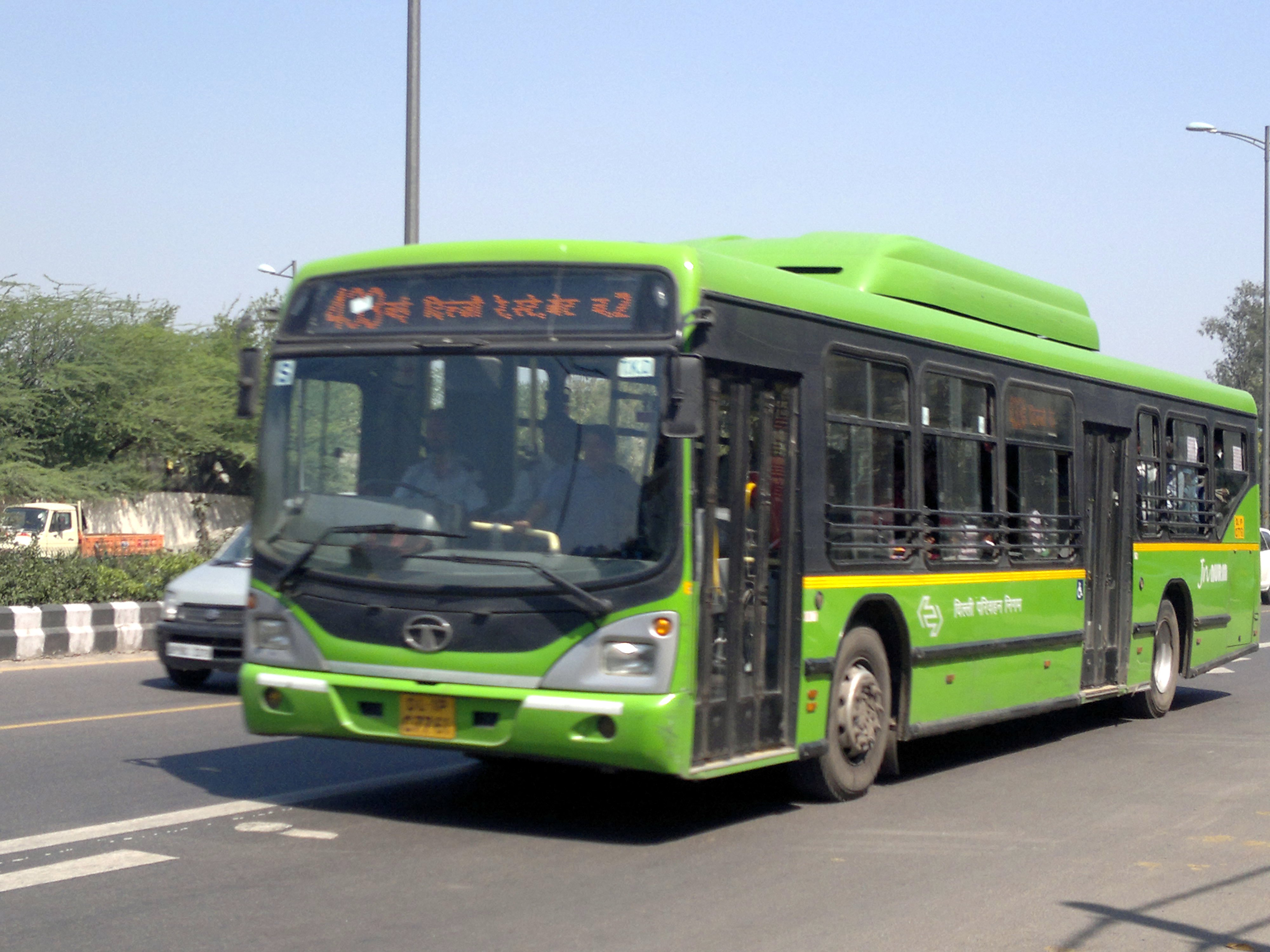
DTC Tata non-AC bus

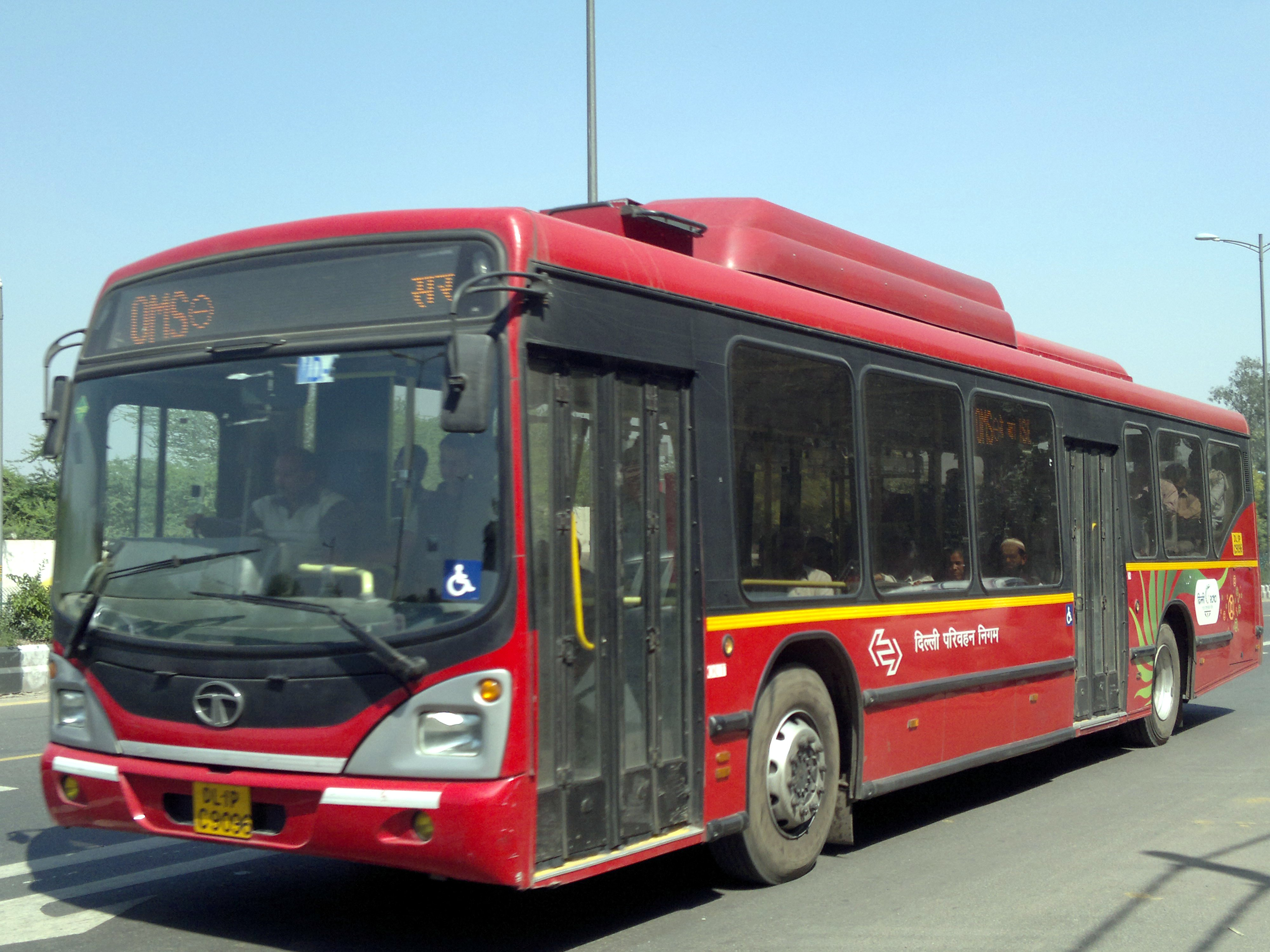
DTC Tata AC bus

== See also ==
- List of buses
