= Subhash Chandra Singh =

Indian politician (born 1960)

Subhash Singh
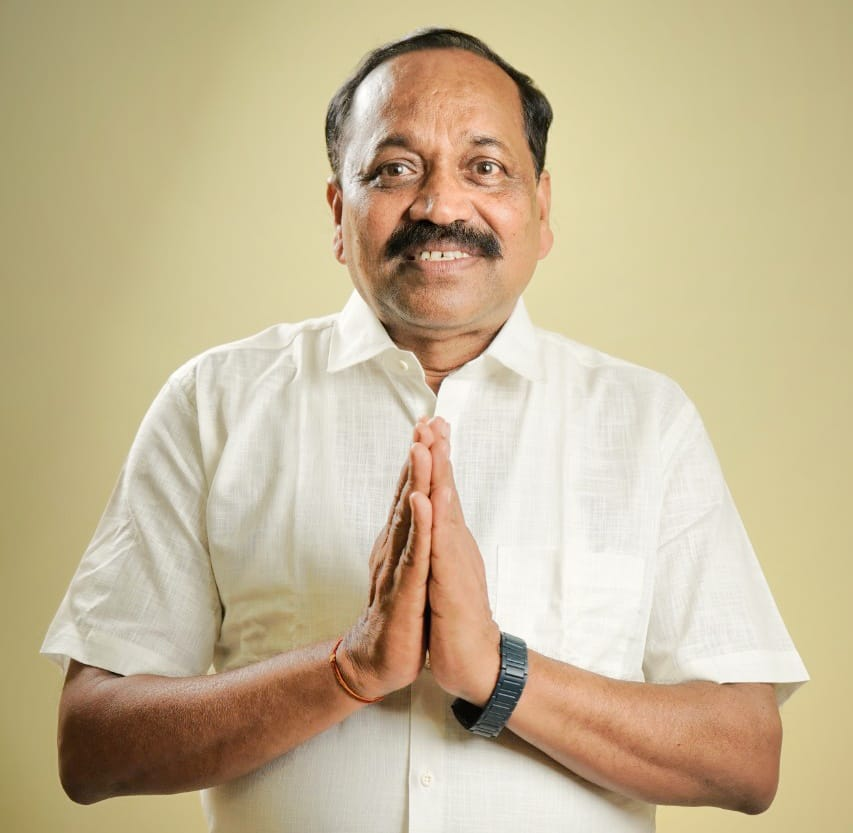
- Official portrait circa 2022

Mayor of Cuttack for Odisha

Founder and General Secretary of Biju Sramika Samukhya (Trade Union Wing of Biju Janata Dal)

Party Treasurer Biju Janata Dal
- Incumbent
- Assumed office April 2022

Personal details
- Born: 15 August 1960 (age 66) Kendrapara, Odisha
- Awards: Awarded Cuttack Gourav Sanman (Pride of Cuttack) by Baimundi

Subhash Chandra Singh (born 1960) is a social activist, people leader and policy maker from the State of Odisha, India. He is the first directly elected Mayor of Cuttack Municipal Corporation, acting Treasurer of Biju Janta Dal and General Secretary of Biju Sramika Samukhya (biggest labor union in Odisha). Previously he has been the member of Rajya Sabha from Odisha and has served as National spokesperson for BJD. He was elected for Rajya Sabha on 24 March 2020. Being one of the most trusted senior leaders in BJD, he holds the position of Party Treasurer of Biju Janta Dal since 2016.

Prior to being elected to Rajya Sabha, he served as Chairman of OB&OCWWB (Odisha Building & Other Construction Worker's Welfare Board) for two consecutive terms.

He is a founder member and general secretary of Biju Shramik Shamukhya (Trade union wing of Biju Janta Dal). Biju Sramika Samukhya is the biggest trade union in Odisha.

He is one of the most active members of Rajya Sabha from Odisha. He voices issues faced by common working class in the parliament, like minimum wage for Aanganwadi and ASHA workers, and welfare schemes for drivers.

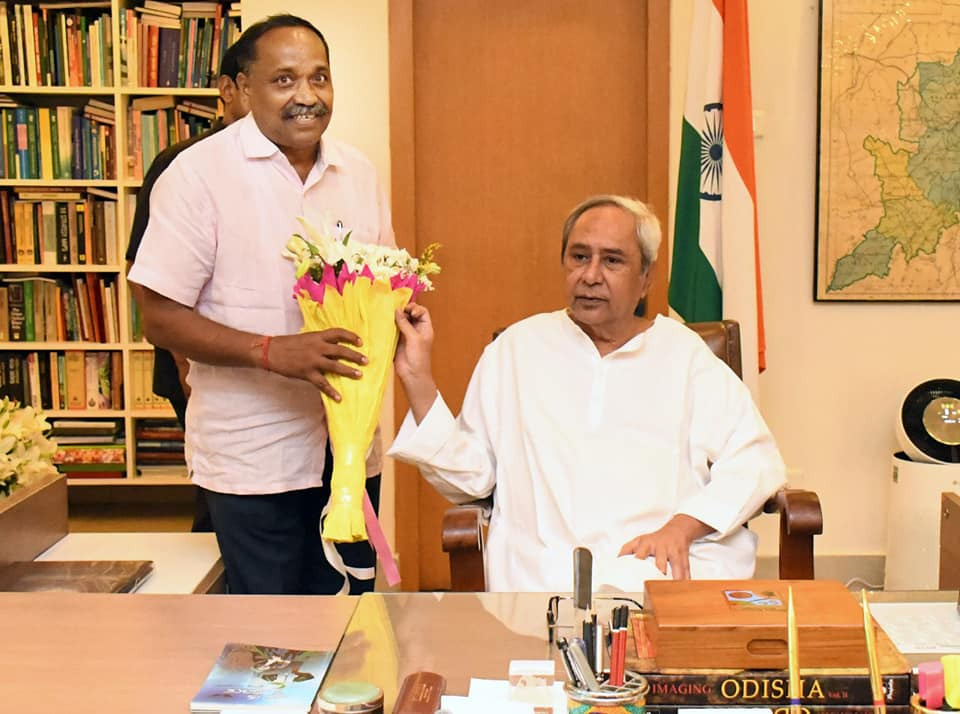
Subhash Singh with Honourable CM Naveen Pattnaik

== Early life ==
Singh was born in a small village of Kendrapada (Father Lt.Damodar Singh and Mother Lt.Anusaya Singh). He started as a people leader and has been instrumental in creation of multiple workers union and welfare initiatives. He was the president of Cuttack Bancho Committee, an all party initiate created in 2006, which has played a key role in the development of Cuttack.

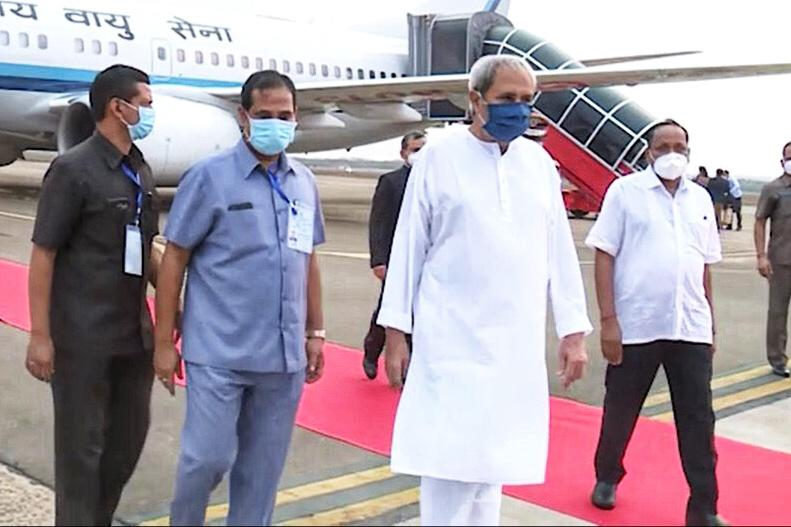
With BJD Supremo Naveen Pattnaik

From 1990 to 2012, he was the face of the communist movement in Odisha. Due to incompetent leadership and internal disputes within CPIM, he joined BJD (Biju Janta Dal) in July 2013. At the time CPIM was directly supporting BJD government in Odisha. BJD Chief and Odisha CM Sri Naveen Patnaik personally welcomed Singh to Biju Janta Dal and said "He is a asset for the Party".

Right after joining BJD, Singh became the state spokesperson for BJD and has been vocal about various developmental schemes by the government ever since. In 2014, he was selected as the Chairman of OB&OCWWB (Odisha Building & Other construction workers Welfare Board). Under his leadership the labor welfare board (OB&OCWWB) enrolled over 28 Lakhs workers and dispersed direct benefits to 20 Lakhs+ workers. His performance was recognized by the state and central government as well as the International Labor Organization.

He advised the state government on various welfare schemes including Jaga Mission, which guarantees permanent settlement for slum dwellers in Odisha. This is one of kind scheme by Odisha Government. This led to his huge popularity among the working class across Odisha. Meanwhile, with his performance record and loyalty towards the party, BJD Chief Shree Naveen Pattnaik appointed him as Party Treasurer for Biju Janta Dal.

In 2018 Singh under the leadership of honorable Chief minister Sri Naveen Patnaik founded Biju Sramika Samukhya - the labour wing of BJD. Within 3 years BSS turned into the biggest and the most active trade union in Odisha.

== Member of Parliament Rajya Sabha ==
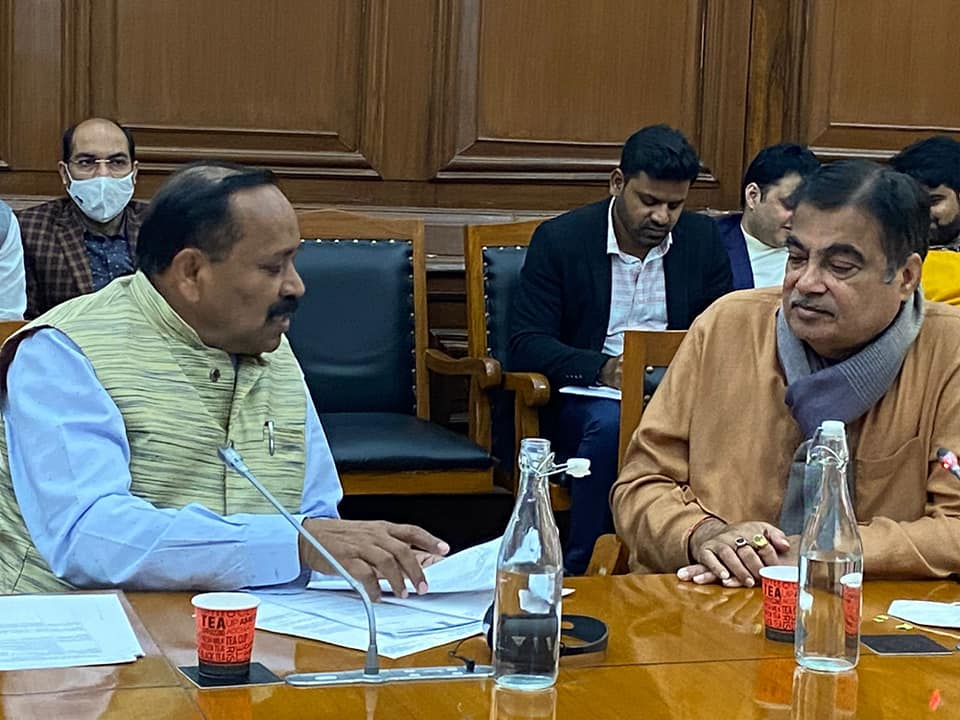
MP Subhash Chandra Singh In discussion with Nitin Gadkari, Minister for Road Transport & Highways on National Highway development projects in Odisha

In March 2020, Singh was elected to Rajya Sabha as Member of Parliament. He was one of the most active MPs from Odisha, known for raising grassroot level issues in the upper house. Some of the issues raised by Singh are as follows.

=== Points Related To Cuttack ===
- Demanded development Naraj as the second railway station for Cuttack.
- Demand for more trains to stop-over at Cuttack, connecting the city to major metros across India.
- Re-development of Barabati Fort by ASI
- Drainage system around NH5 to be improved and City exit points for Cuttack to be beautified by NHAI
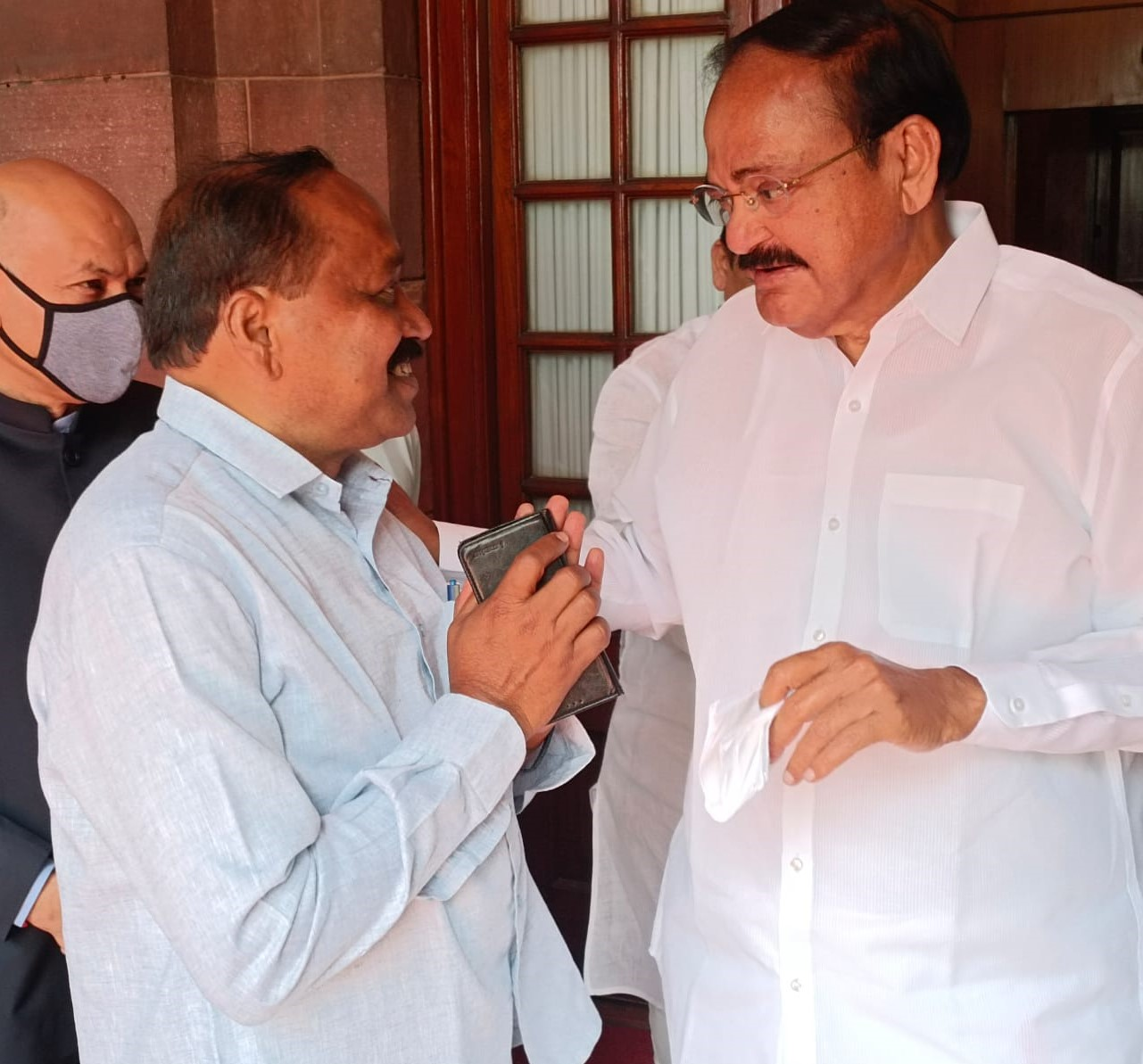
  Subhash Singh with M. Venkaiah Naidu

=== Points Raised for the Working Class ===
- Increase in minimum wage for Aanganwadi workers
- Proving social security to AASHA workers, giving special status and Increasing their minimum wage to INR 18,000.
- Removing GST on Kendu products from 18% to 5%. This will benefit around 10 Lakhs workers.
- Creation for refreshment centers and resting places for commercial drivers on Highways by NHAI
- Train connectivity from Kendrapada to Paradeep for workers travelling daily between both districts.

=== Other Points ===
1. Achieved UGC grant for Balangir Rajendra College post multiple demands at Rajya Sabha and follow ups with Ministry of Education
2. Demanded GI tag for Rasabali, a delicious dessert from Kendrapada district.

In addition to raising issues in the upper house (Rajya Sabha), Singh pursues the solutions by constantly contacting respective ministries. He has become quite popular across party lines.

== Cuttack Municipal Election 2022 - First Directly elected Mayor of Cuttack ==
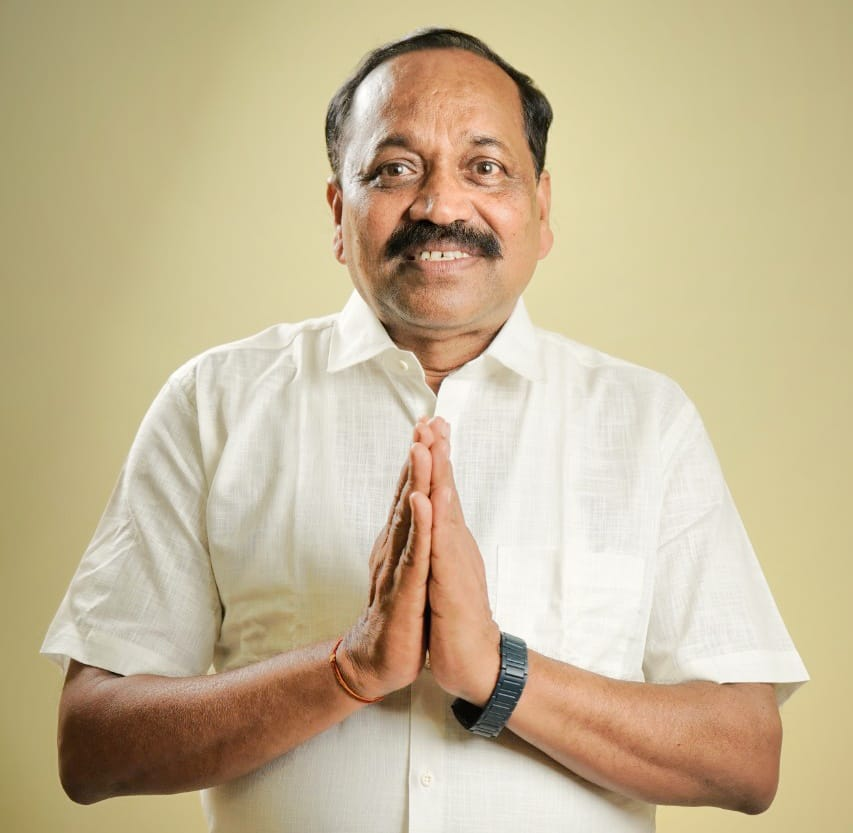
One of the top line leaders from Biju Janta Dal and previously MP Rajya Sabha, became the mayor of Cuttack Municipal Corporation.

In 2022, BJD vote share in the Barbati-Cuttack assembly segment had plummeted to 34.7 percent in 2019 from 45.8 percent in 2014 and 53.8 percent in 2009, when in contrast the vote share of Congress went up from 28.4 percent in 2009 to 34.4 percent in 2014 and 37.6 percent in 2019. The top leadership in the party was on the lookout for a new face. In such scheme of things, CM Patnaik pitted sitting Rajya Sabha member Subhash Singh in the direct mayor election. The Mayor poll results show that BJD's Subash Singh polled a whopping 1.13 lakh votes in the three constituencies, becoming the first directly elected Mayor of Cuttack.

The BJD polled the highest of around 57633 votes in the 2014 Assembly elections, however, it nosedived to 46,417 in 2019 Assembly polls. On the other hand, Subhash Singh has polled over 80,000 votes in the Barbati-Cuttack segment. The winner shield for BJD shows that Congress polled almost around 50,000-52,000 votes in the Assembly segment. The incumbent legislator of Barbati-Cuttack Mojammad Mouqim of the Indian National Congress had polled 50,244 votes in the 2019 assembly polls. Commanding the maximum number of votes not only in Cuttack Barabati but also in Cuttack Sadar and Choudwar, Singh has proved himself to be a popular leader in the Cuttack district.

== Mayor Cuttack Municipal Corporation (2022 - ) ==
Singh has been regarded as an active Mayor for the city of Cuttack. Some significant projects of Mr. Singh as Mayor of Cuttack are listed as follows:

1. Balijatra : Like most carnivals, Bali Jatra was also affected by the pandemic. Due to COVID-19 Bali Jatra was canceled in the year 2020 and 2021. However, it came back in bigger and grander avatar in 2022. Under the leadership of new CMC Mayor Subhash Singh, Balijatra was extended to 100 Acres and included additional attractions like water sports in Mahanadi river, Laser show, Cuttack-in-Cuttack (a model of most popular attractions in Cuttack) etc.
2. Hockey World Cup Opening Ceremony: Under leadership and vision of honorable chief minister of Odisha Sri Naveen Pattnaik, Cuttack hosted the opening ceremony of Hockey Men's World Cup in 2023. Cuttack Municipality Corporation under the leadership of Singh led the arrangements to beautify the city premises and welcome the world to Odisha.
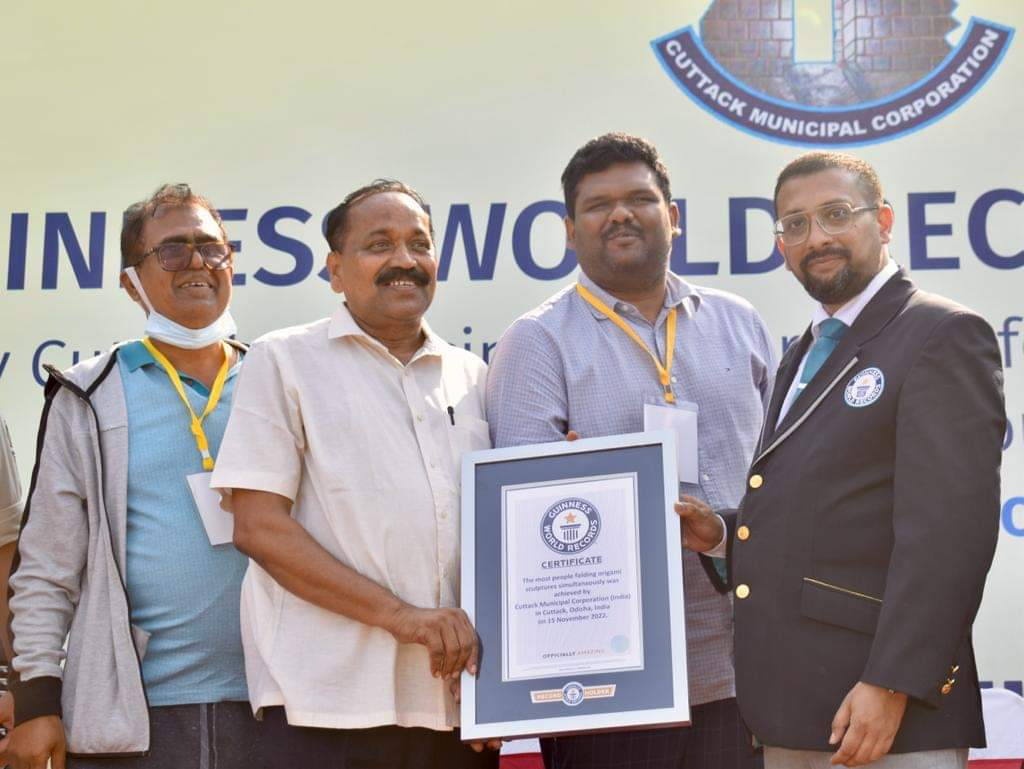
  Subhash Chandra Singh receiving Guinness Book of World Records for Bali Jatra
3. Cuttack Netaji Bus Terminal was completed and inaugurated by Naveen Patnaik in 2023. Singh as Mayor Cuttack and Cuttack Municipal Corporation played a major role in making sure this state of art Bus terminal is completed in time. He struggled through multiple opposition from other political parties and opposite political camps and made sure the project was delivered as promised.
4. Box Drain Completion : Box Drain work which stalled and kept on hold for over 6 years, was taken up by Cuttack Municipal Corporation under leadership of Singh. He expedited the project and completed it within 2 years as promised in his election manifesto. Box drain helped address the water logging crisis in Cuttack neighborhoods and also made way for a new 4 lane road to address traffic crisis.
5. Guinness World Records: In 2022, Bali Jatra etched its name in the Guinness Book of World Records at an event organized by the Cuttack Municipal Corporation under the leadership of Cuttack Mayor Subhash Singh and Commissioner Pawan Kalyan. More than 2100 students of 22 schools made over 22,000 paper boats in 35 minutes, creating the world record.
6. Mo Ward Abhiyan : He started this initiative under the banner Mo Ward, where his whole office along with bureaucrats and officers moves to one of the wards in his constituency and stays there for 2 days, trying to address ongoing issues faced by the residents on the spot. Multiple projects have been sanctions during the Mo Ward program and it is quite popular among people of Cuttack. Some also compare this to the political movie Nayak
7. Other major projects like Metro to Cuttack city and expanding the ring road to 6 lane were taken up during his tenure as Mayor.

== Unions and Labour Forums ==
He is quite popular among young people and poor people. Apart from being in a front line leader in Biju Janta Dal, he is also a labour leader and is part of multiple unions and labor forums across India. This includes Auto Mahasangh, All India Hawkers Association, All Odisha Drivers Mahasangh, AASHA, Anganwadi, Swachya Sathi and multiple other unions. He heads the Labor wing of Biju Janta Dal and is the founder of the biggest labor union in Odisha - Biju Sramika Samukhya.

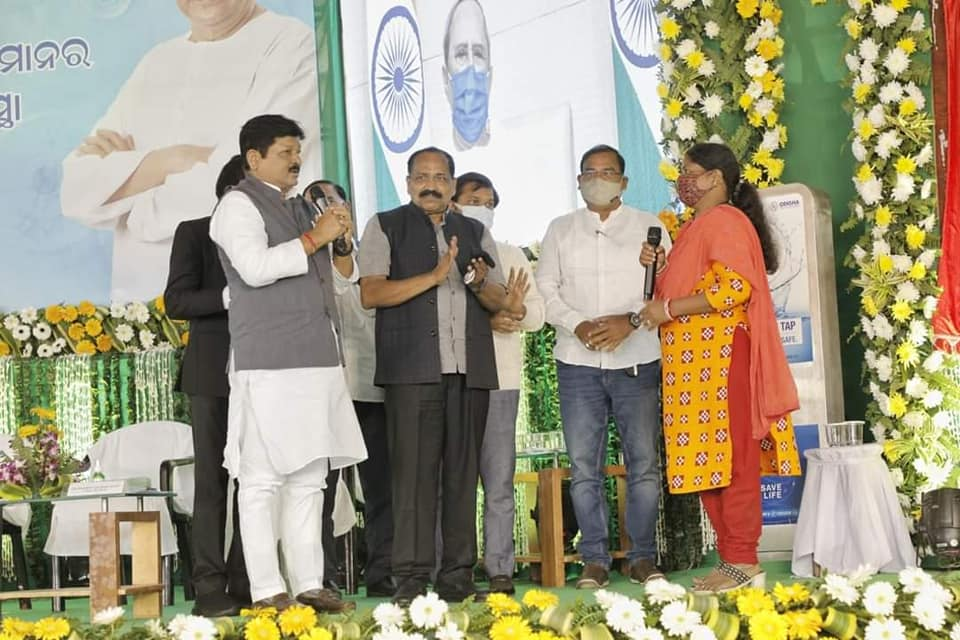
Inaugurating fresh Drinking water initiative in Cuttack, Odisha
