= Odisha State Open University =

Public open university in Odisha, India

- OSOU Official Seal
- Type: Public
- Established: 2015
- Chancellor: Governor of Odisha
- Vice-Chancellor: Shyam Sundar Pattnaik
- Location: Sambalpur, Odisha, India
- Website: OSOU Website

Odisha State Open University (OSOU) is a distance learning state university located in Sambalpur, Odisha, India. The university was established by an Act of the Odisha State Legislature in 2015. The university has jurisdiction over the entire State of Odisha.

== Schools ==
- School of Social Science & Humanities(English, Hindi, Odia, Sanskrit, History, Political Science, Sociology, Economics, Public Administration, Rural Development, Journalism and Mass Communication, Public Policy)
- School of Science & Technology
- School of Education (Continuing and Extension)
- School of Teachers Training
- School of Business and Management Studies(Commerce, Management)
- School of Health Care Sciences(Geriatric Care)
- School of Computer and Information Sciences(Computer Science)
- School of Agriculture

== Study Centres ==
OSOU has established 67 Study Centres at Sambalpur, Bhubaneswar, Berhampur, Rourkela, Jeypore, Koraput, Balasore, Bhadrak, Jajpur, Cuttack, Jagatsinghpur, Paralakhemundi, Malkangiri, Bolangir, Bargarh, Bhawanipatna, Athagarh, Angul, Dhenkanal, Pallahara, Puri, Kendrapara, Khurda, Keonjhar, Nabrangpur, Jharsuguda, Deogarh, Baripada, Nayagarh, Rayagada and Sonepur. Learners are attached to these centres for academic support through trained counsellors and tutors.
