= Siksha 'O' Anusandhan =

Deemed to be University at Odisha, India

Siksha 'O' Anusandhan (Deemed to be University)
- Former name: Siksha 'O' Anusandhan University
- Motto: Strive | Observe | Adapt
- Type: Private deemed university
- Established: 1996
- Founder: Manoranjan Nayak
- Accreditation: NAAC; NBA
- Academic affiliations: UGC; AICTE; BCI; DCI; PCI; NMC; INC; ICAR; VCI
- Chancellor: Amit Banerjee
- Vice-Chancellor: Pradipta Kumar Nanda
- Faculty: 1,081
- Students: 14,033
- Undergraduates: 11,813
- Postgraduates: 2,220
- Doctoral students: 1,141
- Location: Bhubaneswar, Odisha, India; 20°15′33″N 85°47′31″E
- Campus: 127 acres (0.51 km^{2}); Urban
- Website: www.soa.ac.in

Siksha 'O' Anusandhan (Deemed to be University) is a private deemed university in Bhubaneswar, Odisha, India. Many of the programmes are nationally accredited, such as engineering, medicine, pharmacy, business, nursing, biotechnology, science, humanities, environment, nano technology, materials science, agriculture and law.

== History ==
SOA was founded as the Institute of Technical Education and Research (ITER) in 1996 at Bhubaneswar and received AICTE approval for B.Tech. SOA was affiliated with Utkal University from its inception. Between 2002 and 2007, SOA was affiliated with Biju Patnaik University of Technology (BPUT).

Recognising its contribution to technical and professional education, the University Grants Commission (UGC) declared Siksha 'O' Anusandhan a Deemed to be University in 2007 u/s 3 of the UGC Act, 1956. In 2007, the Institute of Technical Education and Research (ITER), Bhubaneswar became a constituent institute of Siksha 'O' Anusandhan University. Institutes, schools, and departments of SOA are spread over 127 acres (0.51 km^{2}) of campuses in the city of Bhubaneswar.

== Academics ==
Siksha 'O' Anusandhan has nine degree-granting schools and institutes that offer undergraduate programs in engineering, medicine, pharmacy, business, nursing, biotechnology, agriculture and law; graduate programs in engineering, medicine, pharmacy, business, nursing, biotechnology, science, humanities, environment, nano technology, materials science, agriculture and law; and doctoral degrees in the above areas.

=== Admissions ===
Siksha ‘O’ Anusandhan Admission Test (SAAT), a national level entrance test, is conducted by the university every year to select bright students. The test is conducted for undergraduate and postgraduate programmes offered through its constituent institutes and schools.

The university grants scholarships to meritorious and disadvantaged students.

=== Rankings ===
University rankings

General – international
- QS (Asia) (2023): 451-500
- Times (World) (2023): 1001–1200
- Times (Asia) (2022): 401–500
- Times (Emerging) (2022): 501+

General – India
- NIRF (Overall) (2024): 24
- NIRF (Research) (2024): 50
- NIRF (Universities) (2024): 14

Engineering – India
- NIRF (2024): 26

Medical – India
- NIRF (2024): 21

Law – India
- NIRF (2024): 9

Dental – India
- NIRF (2024): 9

The National Institutional Ranking Framework (NIRF) ranked Siksha 'O' Anusandhan 24th overall in India, 14th among universities, 26th in the engineering, 62nd in the management, 21st in the medical ranking, 50th in the Research, 9th in Dental and 9th in the Law in 2024.

=== Science and Research ===
Research at Siksha 'O' Anusandhan is headed by a Dean. As of 2023, more than 1,000 research scholars were pursuing Ph.D.s and 599 had been awarded doctorates. Siksha 'O' Anusandhan has sixteen research centres for basic and fundamental research.

== Constituent Units ==
- Institute of Agricultural Sciences (IAS)
- Institute of Business and Computer Studies (IBCS)
- Institute of Dental Sciences (IDS)
- Institute of Medical Sciences and SUM Hospital (IMS & SUM Hospital)
- Institute of Technical Education and Research (ITER)
- Institute of Veterinary Science and Animal Husbandry (IVS & AH)
- School of Hotel Management (SHM)
- SOA National Institute of Law (SNIL)
- School of Pharmaceutical Sciences (SPS)
- SUM Nursing Colleges (SNC)

=== Institute of Technical Education and Research ===
The Institute of Technical Education and Research (ITER) is the Faculty of Engineering and Technology of Siksha 'O' Anusandhan. It was established in 1996. Initially, it was affiliated to Utkal University and from 2002 to 2007 with Biju Patnaik University of Technology. Since 2007, it has been a constituent institute of Siksha 'O' Anusandhan.

ITER includes the following departments:

- Primary Departments
  - Civil Engineering
  - Computer Science and Engineering
  - Computer Science and Information Technology
  - Electrical Engineering
  - Electrical and Electronics Engineering
  - Electronics and Communication Engineering
  - Mechanical Engineering
  - Computer Applications
- Supporting Departments
  - Chemistry
  - Data Science
  - Artificial Intelligence and Machine Learning
  - Cyber Security
  - Internet of Things
  - Mathematics
  - Physics
  - Humanities and Social Sciences

== Campus and Facilities ==
The university is spread over 127 acres (0.51 km^{2}) in the temple city of Bhubaneswar, Odisha.

=== Hostels ===
The university provides hostel accommodation for boys and girls. SOA has 17 girls hostels and 22 boys hostels to accommodate 5,000 girls and 7,100 boys. The hostels have Wi-Fi and medical facilities. The university provides transportation facilities to almost all of Bhubaneswar.

=== Central Library ===
The central library of the university provides international journals, books and dissertations in all branches of Engineering, Sciences, Medical Sciences, Dental Science, Nursing, Biotechnology, Pharmaceutical Sciences, Mathematics, Physics, Chemistry, Economics, Humanities, Business Management, and Law.

The libraries participate in resource sharing networks and consortia such as UGC-INFLIBNET and MHRD-INDEST.

=== SOA-CII ===
The Siksha ‘O’ Anusandhan Centre for Innovation and Incubation (SOA-CII) is a non-profit startup incubator funded, mentored and nurtured by SOA. It operates as a scaled incubator program that nurtures and accelerates startups in their conceptual and development stages. The virtual incubatees can work from any corner of the country.
