= Trisulia =

Village in Cuttack district, Odisha, India

Coordinates: 20.432565°N 85.831282°E

Trisulia is a town in Cuttack in the Indian state of Odisha. The 2.88 km long Netaji Subhash Chandra Bose Bridge which connects the twin cities of Bhubaneswar and Cuttack starts from Trisulia.
