= Nimapada =

- Town
- Nickname: NPR
- Location in Odisha, India Nimapada (India)
- Coordinates: 20.07°N 86.02°E
- Country: India
- State: Odisha
- District: Puri
- Elevation: 8 m (26 ft)

Population (2011)
  - Total: 19,289

Languages
  - Official: Odia
- Time zone: UTC+5:30 (IST)
- PIN: 752106
- Telephone code: 06758
- Vehicle registration: OD13
- Website: odisha.gov.in

Nimapada (previously called as Nimapara) is a town and a Notified Area Council (NAC) in Puri district on the way to Konark and 40 km from the state capital Bhubaneswar in the Indian state of Odisha.

== Geography ==
Nimapada is located at 20.07°N 86.02°E. It has an average elevation of 8 m (26 ft).

== Demographics ==
As of 2001 India census, Nimapada had a population of 16,914, with males constituting 52% and females 48% of the population. The average literacy rate of 77% is higher than the national average of 59.5%: male literacy is 82%, and female literacy 72%. In Nimapada, 10% of the population is under 6 years of age.

== Politics ==
The current MLA from Nimapada (Gen) Assembly Constituency is Pravati Parida of the BJP, who won the seat in the State elections in 2024. The position was held by BJD for a long time. Previous MLAs from this seat were Baidhar Mallick of BJP on 2000 and 2004, Rabindra Kumar Sethy of INC in 1995 and 1985 and 1980 (in 1980, he represented INC(I)), Benudhara Sethy of BJD in 1990, and Govind Chandra Sethi of JNP in 1977.

Nimapada is part of Jagatsinghpur (Lok Sabha constituency).
