= Cuttack Netaji Bus Terminal =

Inter State Bus Terminal in Cuttack, India

Cuttack Netaji Bus Terminal କଟକ ନେଟାଜୀ ବସ୍ ଟର୍ମିନାଲ୍

General information
- Location: Khannagar, Cuttack 753012; Odisha; India
- Coordinates: 20°31′25″N 85°47′17″E
- System: ISBT
- Owner: Government of Odisha
- Bus stands: Bus Bays - 117; Idle Bus Bays - 72; Emergency Vehicle Parking - 2
- Bus operators: OSRTC
- Connections: Mo Bus

Construction
- Parking: Yes

History
- Opened: 16 September 2023
Location
- Location within Odisha Location within India

Cuttack Netaji Bus Terminal or CNBT, is a hi-tech bus stand which has been built by the Odisha Bridge and Construction Corporation (OBCC) over 14.95 acres of land in Khannagar, Cuttack at a cost of ₹90.2 crores. A three-storey bus terminal building has been constructed over two acre land with numerous facilities offering. The bus terminal is named after the illustrious son of Odisha, Netaji Subhas Chandra Bose.

== History ==
Chief Minister of Odisha, Naveen Patnaik, laid the foundation for CNBT on the occasion of the 125th birth anniversary of Netaji Subhas Chandra Bose on 23 January 2021. Chief Minister of Odisha, Naveen Patnaik, inaugurated the bus terminal on 16 September 2023.

== Amenities ==
=== Operational ===
- 40 KW Solar Panel System
- ATMs
- CCTV Surveillance
- Cloakroom
- Integrated Bus Management System
- Odisha Police Outpost
- Sewage Treatment Plant

=== Commercial ===
- Food Court: State-of-the-Art Aahaar Centre, Mission Shakti Café, 3 Cafeterias, Restaurants
- Seating Area: 1,695 Seats
- Shopping: 32 Shops
- 8 Private Rooms, AC Dormitories, Infant Care Rooms
- Waiting Lounges
