= Institute of Medical Sciences and Sum Hospital =

Medical school in Odisha, India

- Motto: Imparting Quality Medical Education
- Type: Deemed Medical school
- Established: 2007
- Parent institution: Siksha 'O' Anusandhan
- Academic affiliations: National Medical Commission
- Dean: Dr. Sanghamitra Mishra
- Students: 750 each year including interns
- Location: Bhubaneswar, Odisha, 751003, India; 20.282984°N 85.769598°E
- Campus: Urban
- Website: www.ims.ac.in

The Institute of Medical Sciences and Sum Hospital (IMS and SUM Hospital) is the medical school of the Siksha 'O' Anusandhan in Bhubaneswar, Odisha, India. This institute gained permission in 2007 from National Medical Commission to start the MBBS courses in medical stream.

It provides undergraduate courses in medicine and dentistry, and postgraduate courses in non-clinical departments. It has begun providing post graduation in clinical subjects like surgery and anesthesia.

It provides speciality services including neurosurgery, haemato-oncology, pediatric surgery, plastic surgery, urology, oncological surgery, surgical gastroenterology, endocrinology, rheumatology, cardiology, neurology, nephrology, and neonatology.

== Medical college ==
The IMS - Institute of Medical Sciences (the college wing) is a private medical college in the state of Odisha. It has six lecture theatres with e-teaching facilities. It has its own library with an internet cafe, and the campus has high-speed wi-fi facility.

== Hospital ==
SUM Hospital has 1750 beds and provides general and super speciality medical services. It has an intensive care unit, the largest such unit in Odisha, and a special N-ICU for neonates.

== Campus ==
The campus has two conference halls, a large activity centre, an open auditorium for cultural programmes, a big theatre-style auditorium for special programmes, a central library, gym, separate hostels for men and women, three canteens, two messes, apartments for interns, quarters for staff, a stadium for cricket and football, and tennis, badminton, basketball and volleyball courts.

== Fire incident ==
An accidental fire incident occurred in the evening of 17 October 2016, with the deaths of 12 people confirmed the following day. It was later confirmed that no death was due to the fire. Deaths occurred due to the hustle in the incident.
