= Amar K. Mohanty =

Material scientist and biomaterial engineer

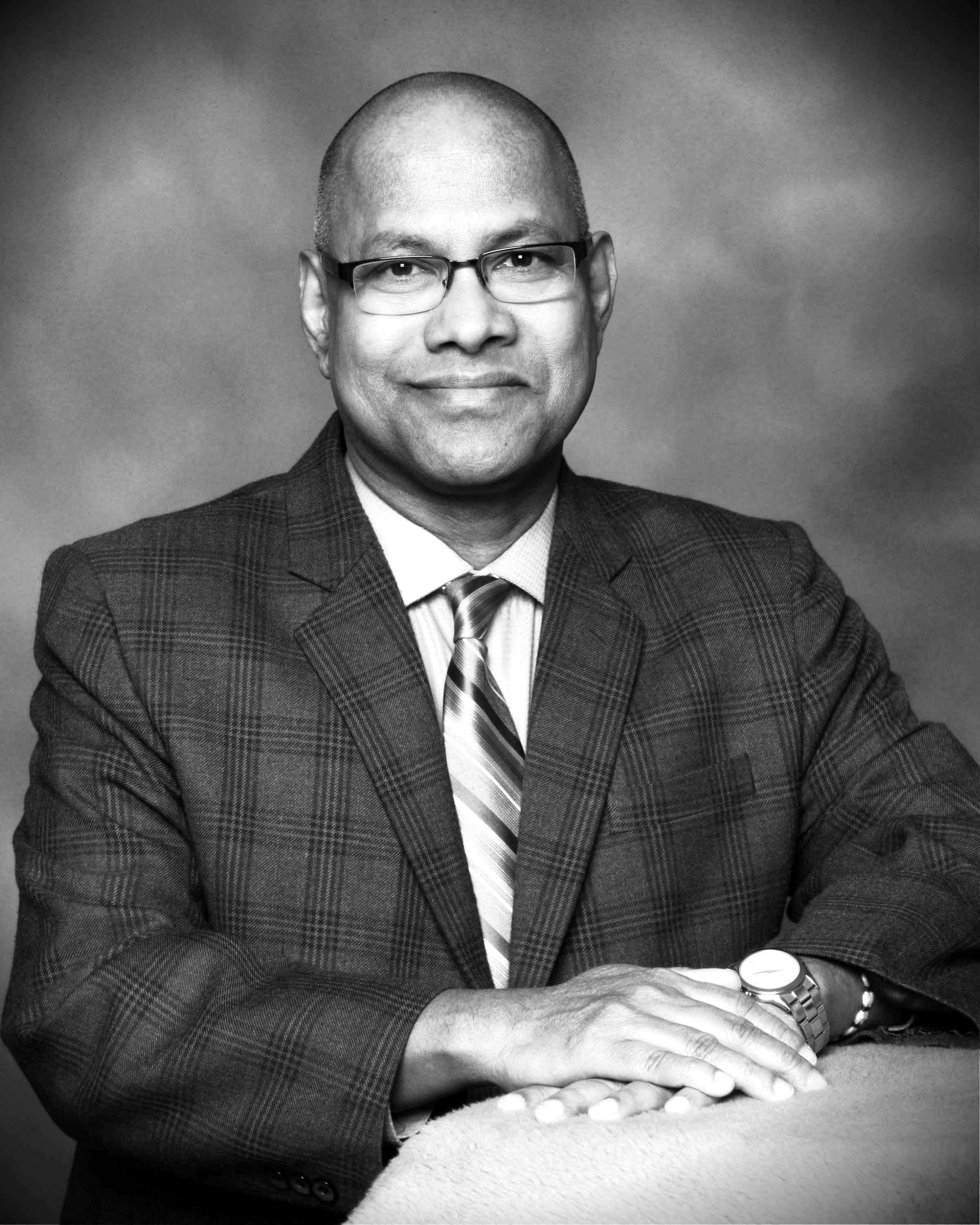
- Born: Orissa, India
- Citizenship: Canada
- Education: Utkal University
- Occupations: Professor, academic and author
- Spouse: Manjusri Misra
- Scientific career
- Workplaces: University of Guelph, Canada; Michigan State University, USA; Iowa State University, USA; Technische Universität Berlin, Germany; Utkal University, India; Berhampur University, India; Ravenshaw University, India
- Website: https://bioproductscentre.com/director

Amar K. Mohanty is an Indian-born Canadian material scientist and biobased material engineer, academic and author. He is a Full Professor and Distinguished Research Excellence Chair in Sustainable Biomaterials at the Ontario Agriculture College and is the Director of the Bioproducts Discovery and Development Centre at the University of Guelph.

Mohanty has received a lot of recognition for his work in the field of bioplastics, biocomposites and advanced biorefinery. He has authored over 850 publications, has been cited over 72,000 times, and has 25 patents awarded. He is also the author of 30 book chapters, and 8 edited books.

Mohanty is a Fellow of the American Institute of Chemical Engineers (AIChE), the Society of Plastics Engineers (SPE), the Royal Society of Chemistry, the Royal Society of Canada, Indian Institute of Chemical Engineers (IIChE) and the Indian Chemical Society (ICS). He is also the Editor-in-Chief of Sustainable Composites, Composites Part C – Open Access.

== Early life and education ==
Mohanty was born in Odisha, India. He spent early life in Cuttack and Bubaneshwar, India. He studied at the Capital High School, Bhubaneswar. Mohanty then studied at Utkal University, and earned his bachelor's degree with Distinction in Chemistry in 1978, a Master's degree in Polymer Chemistry in 1980, and Doctoral degree in Chemistry in 1987.

== Career ==
Following his Doctoral degree, Mohanty held appointment as a Lecturer and Senior Lecturer in 1987 at Government Colleges affiliated with Berhampur and Utkal University, India. From 1998 till 1999, he held brief appointments as Alexander von Humboldt Fellow at Technische Universität Berlin, and as Post-Doctoral Associate at Iowa State University. Following these appointments, he joined Michigan State University as a Visiting Research Associate in 2000, and was promoted to Visiting Associate Professor in 2001, and to associate professor in 2003. He then moved to Canada, and held his next appointment at the University of Guelph as a professor in the Department of Plant Agriculture and School of Engineering.

Mohanty was Premier's Research Chair in Biomaterials & Transportation from 2008 till 2020, Research Leadership Chair from 2017 till 2020, and became OAC Distinguished Research Chair in Sustainable Biomaterials in 2020. Since 2007, he has also been serving as Director/Executive ccommittee member of the American Institute of Chemical Engineers at Forest Product Division.

== Research ==
Mohanty has focused his research on engineering value-added uses of biomass wastes and industrial co-products from agro-food and biofuel industries. He has also worked extensively on sustainable polymers, circular economy, environmental sustainability, waste plastic valorization, biodegradable plastics as single-use plastic alternatives, biocarbon based composites, and 3D printing of sustainable materials.

=== Biocarbon composites ===
Mohanty was the first to demonstrate that biocarbon significantly improves barrier properties when used as a filler in composite materials. He demonstrated that biocarbon acts as an oxygen scavenger to improve oxygen barrier of biodegradable polymers and blends. Furthermore, he explored the impact of poly(propylene carbonate) polyol in the context of biobased epoxy interpenetrating network.

Mohanty was among the pioneers to report the effectiveness of biocarbon as a reinforcing agent, filler, and colourant in thermoplastic composites. He explored several ways to increase the renewable content in plastic resins, developed high-quality biocarbon from a variety of non-food biomass sources, and also showed that the morphology and allotropy of renewable biocarbon can be manipulated for materials design. He was the first to use biocarbon in thermoplastic composites and demonstrate its high potential in industrial applications, to be used as a reinforcement in polymer composite materials and to substitute carbon black, mineral fillers like talc, and short glass fibre. His research regarding biocarbon-based plastic biocomposites is used by Ford Motor Company, Volkswagen, General Motors, and Tesla, while conducting their trials of automotive parts.

=== Biocomposites ===
In his studies regarding bio-based plastics and bio-based fillers, Mohanty designed biocomposites to use closed-loop strategies to improve sustainability through the value-added integration of agri-food residues.

While using "waste" from reclaimed coffee bean skins with more expensive compostable plastic blends, he developed numerous commercial resins, including the world's first 100% compostable coffee pod certified by the Biodegradable Products Institute (BPI). His invention combines the advantages of biodegradable plastics, green chemistry, reactive extrusion, and process engineering, along with the integration of the industrial 'waste' product of the coffee roasting industry. Mohanty along with Manjusri Misra also developed a "green floor" formulation, based on a plant derived plastic resin, poly(lactic acid) (PLA). His innovation eliminated plasticizers containing harmful phthalates in the products.

== Awards, Honours and Distinctions ==
2025	RPG Life Science Padma Vibhushan Prof M.M. Sharma Medal and CHEMCON Distinguished Speaker Award 2025, Indian Institute of Chemical Engineers (IIChE), India
2025	Professor J.N. Mukherjee Memorial Award, Indian Chemical Society, India
2025	Macromolecular Science and Engineering Award, Chemical Institute of Canada, Canada
2025–present	Fellow, Indian Chemical Society (ICS), India
2024	Professor S.K. Sharma & CHEMCON Distinguished Speaker Award, Indian Institute of Chemical Engineers (IIChE), India
2024–present	Distinguished Research Excellence Chair in Sustainable Materials, University of Guelph and Competitive Green Technologies, Canada
2023–present	Fellow, Indian Institute of Chemical Engineers (IIChE)
2022	RSC Miroslaw Romanowski Award Lecture, Royal Society of Canada, Canada
2022	Prof. Dr. Gokulananda Mahapatra Oration Award, Prof. Dr. Gokulananda Nityananda Mahapatra Foundation, India
2021	Miroslaw Romanowski Medal, Royal Society of Canada, Canada
2020–present	Fellow, Royal Society of Canada (RSC), Canada
2020–2023	OAC Distinguished Research Chair in Sustainable Biomaterials, University of Guelph, Canada
2020	JL White Innovation Award, International Polymer Processing Society
2019–present	Fellow, Royal Society of Chemistry (RSC), UK
2019–present	Fellow, Society of Plastics Engineers (SPE), USA
2019	Biju Patnaik Award for Scientific Excellence, Odisha Bigyan Academy, India
2019	OAC Alumni Distinguished Researcher Award, University of Guelph, Canada
2018–present	Fellow, American Institute of Chemical Engineers (AIChE), USA
2018	NSERC Synergy Award for Innovation, Natural Sciences and Engineering Research Council, Canada
2017–2020	Research Leadership Chair Award, University of Guelph, Canada
2017	Highly Prolific Author, American Chemical Society (ACS) Sustainable Chemistry & Engineering, USA
2017	Featured Canadian Author, Selected for ACS Publications Open Access Virtual Issue "Hot Materials in a Cool Country" – articles authored by Canadians to celebrate the 100th Canadian Chemistry Conference
2016	Innovation of the Year Award, University of Guelph, Canada
2015	Lifetime Achievement Award, BioEnvironmental Polymer Society, USA
2012	"Gold Medal" and Certificate, International Conference on Composites Interfaces
2011–2015	5 Year Visiting Professorship, South China University of Technology, China
2011	Jim Hammar Memorial Service Award, BioEnvironmental Polymer Society, USA
2008–2020	Premier's Research Chair in Biomaterials & Transportation, University of Guelph, Canada
2006	Andrew Chase Forest Products Division Award, American Institute of Chemical Engineers, USA
1999	Prof. R. C. Tripathy Memorial Award (Young Scientist Award), Orissa Chemical Society
1998–1999	Alexander von Humboldt Fellowship, AvH Foundation, Germany
1980	Gold medal, Utkal University, Orissa being 1st Class 1st in MSc (Chemistry)

== Personal life ==
Mohanty is married to Manjusri Misra.

== Bibliography ==
=== Selected books ===
- Mechanical Behavior of Fiber-reinforced Polymer Composites (2026) ISBN 9780443342769
- Smart Food Packaging Systems: Innovations and Technology Applications (2024) ISBN 9781394189564
- Nanomaterials from Renewable Resources for Emerging Applications (2023) ISBN 9781000829730
- Fiber Technology for Fiber-Reinforced Composites (2017) ISBN 9780081009932
- Biocomposites: Design and Mechanical Performance (2015) ISBN 9781782423942
- Handbook of Polymernanocomposites. Processing, Performance and Application: Volume A: Layered Silicates (2014) ISBN 9783642386497
- Packaging Nanotechnology (2009) ISBN 9781588831057
- Natural Fibers, Biopolymers, and Biocomposites (2005) ISBN 9781135498979

=== Selected articles ===
- Mohanty, A. K., Misra, M. A., & Hinrichsen, G. I. (2000). "Biofibres, biodegradable polymers and biocomposites: An overview". Macromolecular materials and Engineering, 276(1), 1–24.
- Mohanty, A. K., Misra, M., & Drzal, L. T. (2002). "Sustainable bio-composites from renewable resources: Opportunities and challenges in the green materials world". Journal of Polymers and the Environment, 10(1), 19–26.
- Wu, F., Misra, M., & Mohanty, A.K. (2021). "Challenges and new opportunities on barrier performance of biodegradable polymers for sustainable packaging". Progress in Polymer Science, 101395.
- Meereboer, K., Misra, M., & Mohanty, A.K. (2020). "Review of recent advances on biodegradability of polyhydroxyalkanoate (PHA) bioplastics and their green composites". Green Chemistry, 22(17), 5519–5558.
- Joshi, S. V., Drzal, L. T., Mohanty, A. K., & Arora, S. (2004). "Are natural fiber composites environmentally superior to glass fiber reinforced composites?". Composites Part A: Applied science and manufacturing, 35(3), 371–376.
- Mohanty, A. K., Vivekanandhan, S., Pin, J. M., & Misra, M. (2018). "Composites from renewable and sustainable resources: Challenges and innovations". Science, 362(6414), 536–542.
