= Emma Parmee =

British chemist

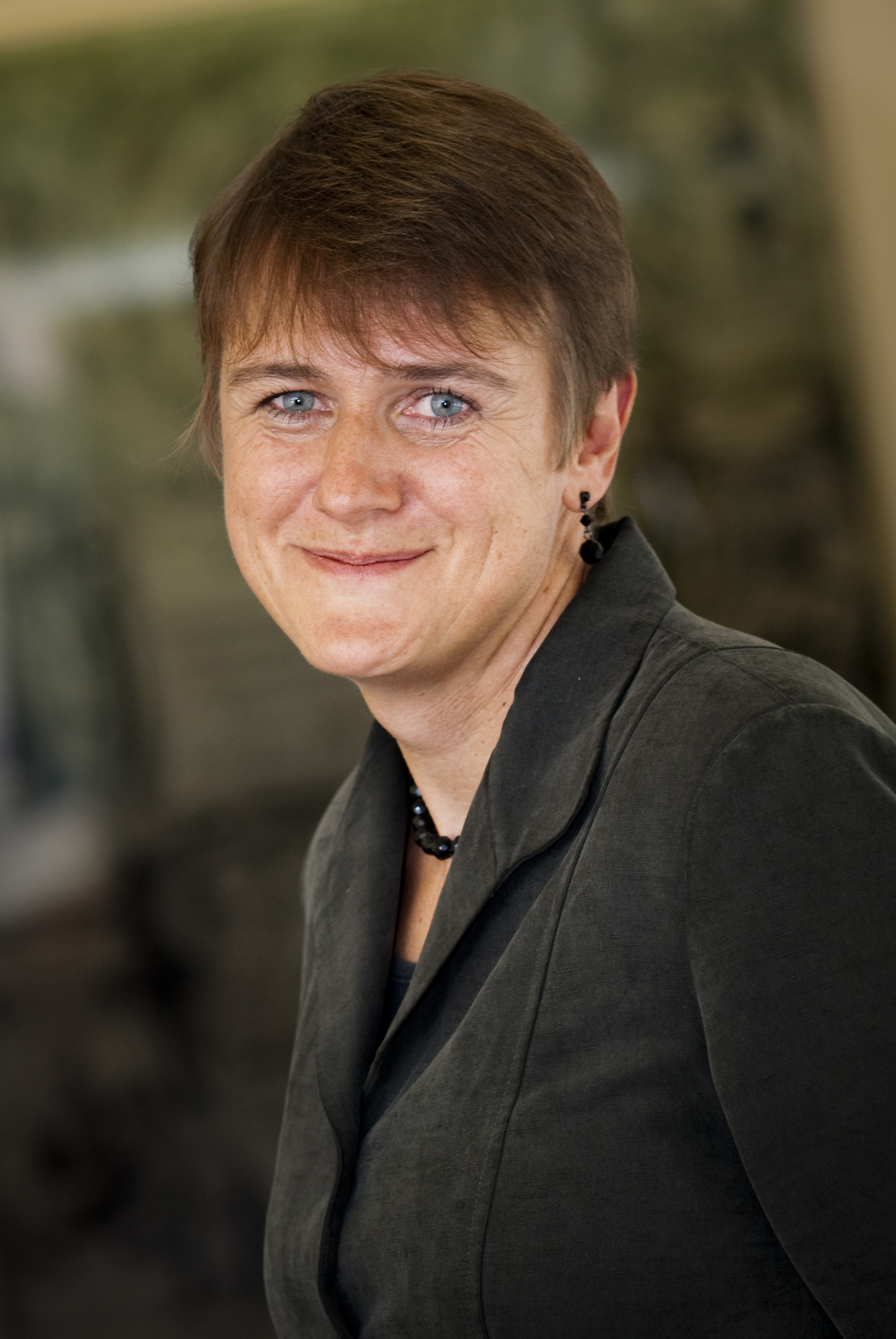
- Emma Parmee, 2009
- Other name: Emma Rachel Parmee
- Education: University of Oxford; Massachusetts Institute of Technology
- Occupation: scientist
- Employer: Merck & Co.
- Awards: Gordon E. Moore Medal (SCI)

Emma Parmee is a British chemist and research scientist who is a co-inventor of numerous drug patents. She was one of the leading researchers in the development of sitagliptin and was awarded a Thomas Alva Edison Patent Award in 2007 and the Society of Chemical Industry's Gordon E Moore Medal in 2009 for her contributions.

== Biography ==
Emma Rachel Parmee was born in the United Kingdom obtaining a BA and PhD at the University of Oxford in chemistry. She completed her thesis in 1990 and was awarded a NATO post-doctoral fellowship. She moved to the United States to complete her post-doctoral work under Saturo Masamune at the Massachusetts Institute of Technology, studying catalysts of asymmetric synthesis for aldol reactions. She completed her post-doctoral research in 1992 and joined Merck & Co. that same year working at their research laboratory in Rahway, New Jersey.

In 2006, Parmee was one of the lead investigators in the discovery of the selective Dipeptidyl peptidase-4 inhibitor sitagliptin (marketed by Merck under the trade name Januvia). The drug is used to treat Type 2 Diabetes and provides glucose lowering benefits without the side effects of some of the previously available treatments. Her involvement was recognised by the award of the Thomas Alva Edison Patent Award from the Research and Development Council of New Jersey, the Prix Galien for Endocrinology in 2007 and the receipt of the 2009 Gordon E Moore Medal from the Society of Chemical Industry.

In 2010, Parmee left the Rahway lab and moved to the facility at West Point, Pennsylvania, where she served as the site lead for chemical discovery until 2013. Her group developed a small molecule CGRP antagonist. She was then promoted to Associate Vice-President and Head of Exploratory Chemistry . She also serves as the co-chair of the Early Discovery Council for Merck Research Laboratories. She has written more than forty papers which have appeared in peer-reviewed publications and has filed for over thirty US patents on her work. Parmee lives with her husband, son, and daughter.

== Selected works ==
- Karim, Sufia; Parmee, Emma R; Thomas, Eric J (May 1991). "Milbemycin synthesis: synthesis of 6β-hydroxy-3,4-dihydromilbemycin E". Tetrahedron Letters. 32 (20): 2269–2272. doi:10.1016/s0040-4039(00)79699-7.
- Parmee, Emma R; Ok, Hyun O; Candelore, Mari R; et al. (1998). "Discovery of L-755,507: A subnanomolar human β 3 adrenergic receptor agonist". Bioorganic & Medicinal Chemistry Letters. 8 (9): 1107–1112. doi:10.1016/s0960-894x(98)00170-x. PMID 9871717.
- Parmee, Emma R; Naylor, Elizabeth M; Perkins, Leroy; et al. (1999). "Human β 3 adrenergic receptor agonists containing cyclic ureidobenzenesulfonamides". Bioorganic & Medicinal Chemistry Letters. 9 (5): 749–754. doi:10.1016/s0960-894x(99)00073-6. PMID 10201841.
- Mastracchio, Anthony; Parmee, Emma R; Leiting, Barbara; et al. (May 2004). "Heterocycle-Fused Cyclohexylglycine Derivatives as Novel Dipeptidyl Peptidase-IV Inhibitors". ChemInform. 35 (20). doi:10.1002/chin.200420183.
- Parmee, Emma R.; Sinharoy, Ranabir; Xu, Feng; Givand, Jeffrey C.; Rosen, Lawrence A. (2012). "Discovery and Development of the DPP-4 Inhibitor Januvia™ (Sita-Gliptin)". Case Studies in Modern Drug Discovery and Development. pp. 10–44. doi:10.1002/9781118219683.ch2. ISBN 9781118219683.
