= Manjusri Misra =

Indian-Canadian engineer

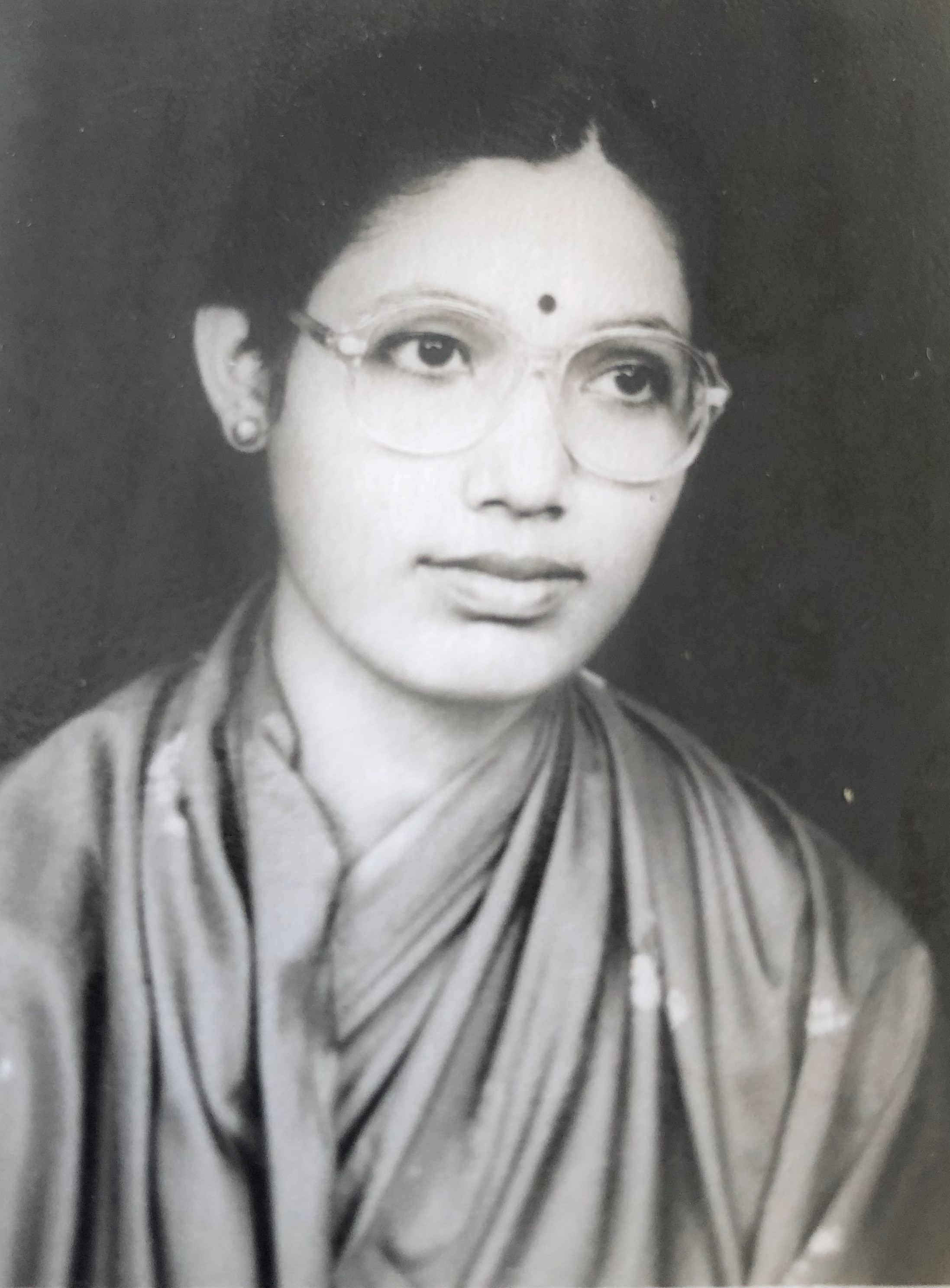
- Manjusri Misra - Photo taken in 1985
- Born: Orissa, India
- Citizenship: Canada
- Occupation: Academic
- Spouse: Amar K. Mohanty

Academic background
- Education: BSc, MSc, M.Phill, PhD in Chemistry, Utkal University

Academic work
- Institutions: University of Guelph; Michigan State University; Utkal University
- Website: https://bioproductscentre.com/home

Professor Manjusri Misra is an Indian-born Canadian professor and scientist. She is a Tier 1 Canada Research Chair in Sustainable Biocomposites at the University of Guelph's (U of G) College of Engineering and holds a joint appointment in the Department of Plant Agriculture. Misra is also the lead scientist at U of G's Bioproducts Discovery and Development Centre (BDDC) and a Fellow of the Royal Society of Canada (RSC); the American Institute of Chemical Engineers (AIChE); the Royal Society of Chemistry; the Society of Plastic Engineers (SPE), and the Indian Institute of Chemical Engineers (IIChE).

Misra has received a lot of recognition for her work in sustainable biocomposites and biopolymers. She has authored over 850 publications, has been cited over 66,000 times, and is an author of 30 book chapters and 8 edited books.

== Early life and education ==
Misra was born in Odisha, India, into a family of academics, to her father, Late Pandit Govinda Chandra Mishra, and her mother, Late Mrs. Suhasini Mishra. She received her High School diploma from Ravenshaw Collegiate School, Cuttack, and Bachelors degree from Shailabala Women's College (currently Shailabala Women's Autonomous College). She completed her Master's and PhD degrees from Ravenshaw College (currently Ravenshaw University), Cuttack under Utkal University before completing her post-doctoral work in Fritz Huber Institute of the Max Planck Society, Berlin and Technische Universität Berlin, Germany.

== Career ==
Following her PhD, Misra was a Senior Lecturer in Chemistry at various academic institutes (Shailabala Women's College, B. J. B. College and Ravenshaw College) under Utkal University. She was also a visiting adjunct professor at Michigan State University. While at Michigan State, Misra worked in Composite Materials and Structures Center in the Department of Chemical Engineering and Materials Science where she began her various research projects on "Sustainable Biobased and Biodegradable Composites and Green Nanocomposites for Automotives and Packaging Applications." She was also an editor of the CRC Press volume, "Natural Fibers, Biopolymers and Biocomposites," in 2005.

Misra eventually joined the faculty of the College of Engineering and the Department of Plant Agriculture at the University of Guelph (U of G) in 2008. Upon joining the institution, Misra was appointed president of the BioEnvironmental Polymer Society and served as an editor for various journals. She also edited the American Scientific Publishers volume "Packaging Nanotechnology" in 2009. Following this, Misra received the Jim Hammar Memorial Award from the BioEnvironmental Polymer Society and the 2017 American Institute of Chemical Engineers Andrew Chase Division Award in Chemical Engineering as an individual with "significant chemical engineering contributions in the forest products and related industries." During her tenure at U of G, Misra co-directed the Bioproducts Discovery and Development Centre with her husband which aimed to produce bio-based, sustainable materials that lower greenhouse gas emissions and reduce the impact of plastics. In 2019, her efforts were recognized with the Synergy Award for Innovation from the Natural Sciences and Engineering Research Council of Canada.

In December 2020, Misra was named a Tier 1 Canada Research Chair in Sustainable Biocomposites. She was also recognized by the Women's Executive Networks as one of the Most Powerful Women for 2020. She was specifically recognized for being a "world leader in the development of novel bio-based composites and nanocomposites made from agricultural and forestry resources." The following year, Misra received a Lifetime Achievement Award from the BioEnvironmental Polymer Society for "outstanding contributions to advancing the field of biopolymers, bio-based composite materials." In 2024, Misra was recognized as one of the Global 50 Women in Sustainability under the theme "Embrace Boldness" by SustainabilityX® Magazine for demonstrating exceptional leadership in sustainability and driving transformative change across the globe.

== Awards, Honours and Distinctions ==
2026	James L. White Innovation Award, Polymer Processing Society (PPS)
2025	Fellow, Indian Chemical Society (ICS)
2025	CHEMCON 2025 Distinguished Speaker Award, Indian Institute of Chemical Engineers (IIChE)
2024	Global 50 Women In Sustainability - Embrace Boldness Theme, The SustainabilityX® Magazine, New York City, USA
2024	Fellow, Royal Society of Canada (RSC)
2023	Present Fellow, Indian Institute of Chemical Engineers (IIChE)
2021	Fellow, Society of Plastic Engineers (SPE), USA
2021	Lifetime Achievement Award, BioEnvironmental Polymer Society (BEPS), USA
2020	Canada Research Chair (CRC) Tier 1 – Sustainable Biocomposites, Natural Science and Engineering Research Council of Canada (NSERC)
2020	Canada's Most Powerful Women: Top 100 Awards – Manulife Science and Technology Category, Women's Executive Networks (WXN), Canada
2020	CEPS Undergraduate Supervision Award, College of Engineering and Physical Sciences (CEPS), University of Guelph, Canada
2020	Fellow, American Institute of Chemical Engineers (AIChE), USA
2019	The Prestigious "Glory of India" (Bharat Jyoti) Award, India International Friendship Society
2019	Fellow, Royal Society of Chemistry, UK
2019	Woman of Distinction on Science, Technology, Engineering & Math (STEM): Guelph YMCA-YWCA Women of Distinction, Canada
2018	NSERC Synergy Award for Innovation, Natural Sciences and Engineering Research Council, Canada
2017	Andrew Chase Forest Products Division Award, American Institute of Chemical Engineers (AIChE), USA
2017	Featured Canadian Author Two publications chosen for the American Chemical Society (ACS) Publications Open Access Virtual Issue "Hot Materials in a Cool Country" featuring articles authored by Canadians to celebrate the 100th meeting of the Canadian Chemistry Conference.
2016	University of Guelph's Innovation of the Year Award, Canada The award is for the creation of the 100% Compostable Bio-composite Resin using coffee chaff (waste stream of coffee roasting industry) for single-serve coffee pods, called PURPOD100®. More awards for this innovation can be found here
2014	Composites Part A Most Highly Cited Paper Award "Characterization of natural fiber surfaces and natural fiber composites", selected for the award which highlights that the paper has truly generated interest and awareness within the composites community.
2012	Jim Hammar Memorial Service Award, BioEnvironmental Polymer Society (BEPS), USA

== Personal life ==
Misra is married to Amar Mohanty.
