= Melinda H. Keefe =

American chemist

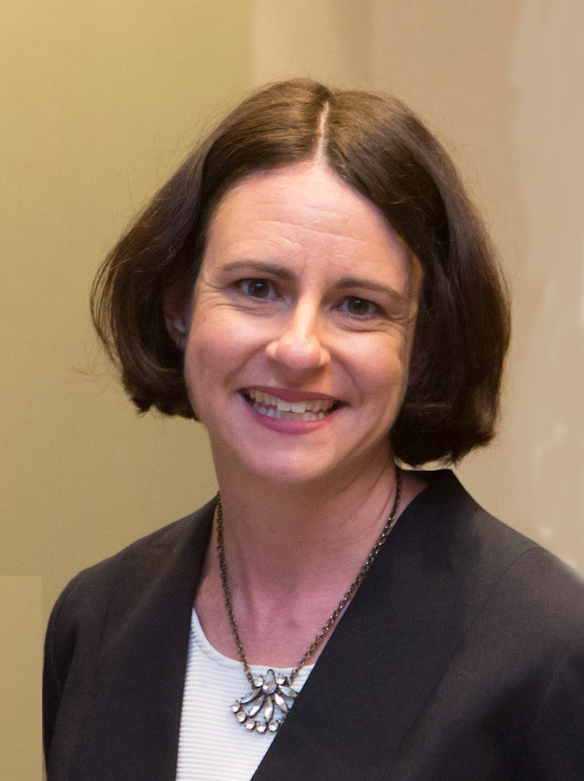
- Melinda H. Keefe, Innovation Day, 2017
- Education: Pennsylvania State University, Northwestern University
- Awards: Gordon E. Moore Medal (SCI)
- Scientific career
- Fields: Architectural coatings, Art conservation science
- Workplaces: Dow Chemical Company

Melinda H. Keefe is a research and development director at the Dow Chemical Company, where she works on architectural coatings. She helped to develop the award-winning Evoque pre-composite polymer platform, reducing TiO_{2} usage.

Keefe also leads a collaborative project in which Dow works with art conservators at institutions such as the Tate Modern and the Getty Conservation Institute. Her work on wet cleaning systems has helped to identify solvents that conservators can use to remove dirt without damaging layers of paint. In 2012, Keefe identified a suitable solvent to repair Mark Rothko's vandalized painting Black on Maroon 1958. Keefe has received a number of awards including the 14th annual SCI Gordon E. Moore Medal.

== Education ==
Melinda H. Keefe was initially an art major, before earning a B.S. in chemistry at Pennsylvania State University (1997) and a Ph.D. in inorganic chemistry at Northwestern University (2001).

== Research ==
Keefe has published in the areas of polymer synthesis, paint formulation, high-throughput coatings, and art conservation science. and has applied for a number of patents.

=== Architectural coatings ===
Keefe joined Dow in 2001, and is now an R&D manager, specializing in the development of architectural coatings. These include the Evoque pre-composite polymer platform. The Evoque polymer encapsulates titanium dioxide to more evenly distribute TiO_{2} within coatings. This improves the hiding efficiency of the coating (its ability to cover the color of the base material to which the coating is applied). Less TiO_{2}, often the most expensive and energy-intensive component of a coating, is required. Evoque received the 2013 Greener Reaction Conditions Award in the EPA's Presidential Green Chemistry Challenge for industrial contributions to green science. The Dow Coatings Team, including Keefe, received the 2017 "Heroes of Chemistry" Award from the American Chemical Society for the development of Evoque.

=== Art restoration ===
In 2005, treatments for the conservation of modern and contemporary paintings were described as an area "in desperate need of research and focus". In 2008 Keefe began a partnership with Dow, the Tate and the Getty Conservation Institute to work on the development of specialized solvents for use by art conservators. Keefe helped to develop wet cleaning systems for the identification of possible cleaning liquids capable of removing surface dirt without damaging multiple paint layers. Dow provided high-throughput (HTP) analytical devices for the rapid screening of potential cleaning solutions, varying the percentage of each additive and monitoring factors such as paint gloss, color, flexibility, migrated surfactant removal and residue detection.

“One of the challenges about art conservation is that every piece is different, each has its own mixtures in terms of raw materials and what it has been exposed to,” explained Keefe. “There is not going to be one perfect solution, but we could find one that is well suited for your needs. You don’t want to do anything that will harm the painting or the integrity of the art.”

In 2012, after Mark Rothko's painting Black on Maroon 1958 was damaged by a vandal using black graffiti ink, Keefe helped identify ethyl lactate as a suitable solvent for use in its restoration. After 18 months of work, the painting returned to display at London’s Tate Modern gallery in May, 2014.

== Awards ==
- 2013, Presidential Green Chemistry Award for Evoque
- 2013, R&D 100 Award to co-developers at Dow Chemical Company for Paint Hiding with Less
- 2014, "Heroes of the 500", Fortune 500
- 2015, ACS Rising Star Award from the Women Chemists Committee of the American Chemical Society
- 2017, "Heroes of Chemistry" Award to the Dow Coatings Team from the American Chemical Society
- 2017, Gordon E. Moore Medal, Society of Chemical Industry (American Section)
