= Ramesh C. Ray =

Agriculture and food microbiologist

Ramesh Chandra Ray
- Born: 22 November 1955 (age 70); Jajpur, Odisha, India
- Occupations: Agriculture and food microbiologist, author, and editor

Academic background
- Education: B.Sc., M.Sc., and Ph.D.
- Alma mater: Utkal University, India

Academic work
- Institutions: Indian Council of Agricultural Research (ICAR)- Central Tuber Crops Research Institute Bhubaneswar/Thiruvanathapuram, India

Ramesh Chandra Ray is an agriculture and food microbiologist, author, and editor. He is the former principal scientist (microbiology), and head of the Regional Centre at Indian Council of Agricultural Research ICAR - Central Tuber Crops Research Institute in Bhubaneswar, India.

Ray is the author of Agricultural and Biotechnological Applications of Bacillus subtilis, Lactic acid Fermentation of Sweet Potato, and Extracellular Thermostable α- amylase from Streptomyces erumpens, and editor of several agriculture and food microbiology books. His research interests are in the fields of food biology, and bioprocess technology with a particular focus on fermented food system, microbiology, food security, bio-ethanol from starchy crops, as well as bio-processing of agricultural and food wastes.

Ray is a Fellow of National Academy of Agricultural Sciences, National Academy of Biological Sciences, and Confederation of Horticultural Societies in India. He holds editorial appointment as Series Editor of Food Biology, and Applied Biotechnology Reviews. He was included in the top 2% scientists of the world ranking in a database prepared by Stanford University in 2021, 2022 and 2023.

== Education ==
After completing his early education from the Board of Secondary Education in Odisha, Ray enrolled at the Utkal University and graduated with majors in Botany, Zoology, and Chemistry in 1974. Later, in 1976, he received his M.Sc. in botany from the Utkal University in Odisha, India, followed by his Ph.D. in botany in 1984.

== Career ==
Ray started his academic career as a Full-time Lecturer in Botany at the Kendrapara Autonomous College, Government of Orissa in India in 1980, and held that appointment till 1985. He also served as Guest Faculty in the Department of Microbiology at the Utkal University in Bhubaneswar from 2000 till 2010.

Ray held an appointment as a Scientist of Plant Physiology at the ICAR-Indian Institute of Horticultural Research in Bangalore from 1985 till 1988. Following this appointment, he served as the Senior Scientist of Microbiology at the ICAR-Central Tuber Crops Research Institute based in Thiruvanathapuram/Bhubaneswar from 1988 till 1998. Subsequently, he was appointed as a principal scientist at the ICAR-Central Tuber Crops Research Institute, Regional Centre in Bhubaneswar, and held that position for nearly two decades. From 2019 till 2020, he served as a senior consultant at the International Potato Center based in Odisha, India.

== Research ==
Ray's research works span the fields of agriculture & food microbiology, bioprocess technology, and have particularly covered wide range of aspects associated with the traditional fermented food system, and its health attributes, food security, lacto-pickling of vegetables, bio valorization of food wastes, and the production of bio-ethanol.

=== Food fermentation processes and microbial technology ===
Ray has made contributions in the field of food microbiology, particularly by exploring the food processing of roots, tubers, fruits and vegetables, and developing food processing technology. Together with V.K. Joshi, he provided in-depth information on the natural food fermentation processes, and explored the diverse range of fermenting microbes along with their benefits for the product quality, and energetics of the process. In one of his highly cited works "Fermented Fruits and Vegetables of Asia: A Potential Source of Probiotics", he highlighted the crucial role of lactic acid fermentation of vegetables and fruits in the tropical and subtropical regions. He has conducted several studies on the lacto-pickling of vegetables, and his research addressed how the fermented foods carry high nutritional value, increased shelf life, reduced toxins, and a diverse group of probiotics. While studying the consumer acceptance of lactic acid-fermented sweet potato pickle, his research demonstrated that the highly educated consumer preferred it more, whereas an improvement in the sourness, and aroma could lead to an increase in consumer acceptance.

Ray developed a technology for production of lacto-juice with high nutritional value by the lactic acid fermentation of β-carotene-rich sweet potato (Ipomoea batatas L.). He also conducted research on developing processing technology for fruit wines and probiotic beverages from the typically underutilized fruits such as Jamun, and cashew apple. His research investigated the bio-processing of wastes from fruits and vegetables for the production of useful enzymes and organic acids, and addressed how the advances in microbial processing technology can increase the production of value-added products, and promote the zero-waste economy.

Ray's research also showed that the agro-food chain industry must rely on the use of microbes, and further emphasized that the use of selected microbes can reduce the risk of food borne threats associated during the food processing, or storage. Moreover, he called attention to the development of new preservation methods using microbes.

=== Bio-valorization ===
Ray's research on bio valorization of wastewaters from the agro-food and beverage industry explored the microbial remediation options that will not only focus on their safe disposal, but also provide value-added products from the wastewaters. More recently, he studied the winery waste from the context of bio valorization, and concluded that by utilizing biomass pyrolysis, grape stalks can lead to energy production, phenolic antioxidants can be derived from grape seeds, whereas anthocyanins can be obtained from the grape skins.

=== Attributes of cow dung microbes ===
Ray has investigated the beneficial attributes of cow dung, and its microflora for advanced applications in the fields of agriculture, biotechnology, and environment as well. In the context of geo-microbiological processes, his research illustrated the role of cow dung microorganisms for sulfur oxidation, and phosphorus solubilization. In the agricultural field, the cow dung-microbes were regarded as essential for the control of plant pathogens, whereas biosorption of heavy metals concerning their application to environmental field was also determined with his research. It was also indicated from his research that the Bacillus subtilis strains isolated from the cow dung carried significant benefits such as biocontrol, plant growth promotion as well as the production of amylase and cellulase enzymes. Furthermore, he reported that the application of this microbe's suspension on the yam minisetts significantly impacted the growth of in terms of an increased number of roots, shoots length etc. He also explored the literature concerned with the production of microbial cellulase in solid state fermentation by employing the modern technologies, as well as discussed, the strategies that account for the improvement of enzyme yield.

=== Bioethanol production ===
Ray is well-recognized for his research on bioethanol production, and has conducted research on the technological interventions in ethanol production from both the sources of plant biomass, and food crops, as well as indicated the food security issues associated with the bioethanol production. An area of prominence in his research is the effective, and feasible production of bioethanol from mohua flowers while indicating it an alternate to sugar or starchy crops for the production of ethanol. By conducting the solid-state fermentation of yeast Saccharomyces cerevisiae, he investigated the production of fuel ethanol from mohua flowers, (Madhuca latifolia L.). Later, his comparative studies focused on determining the efficiency of bio-ethanol production from mohua by employing the immobilized cells of Saccharomyces cerevisiae (CTCRI strain) and Zymomonas mobilis (MTCC 92) in calcium alginate as beads determined that the S. cerevisiae were more effective in producing ethanol as compared to the immobilized cells of Zymomonas mobilis.

== Awards and honors ==
- 1998-20 – Indian Council of Agriculture Research Team Research Award on Post-Harvest Technology, ICAR, New Delhi
- 2005 – Asian Federation of Lactic Acid Bacteria, Japan Research Award, Bali, Indonesia
- 2007 – French Government Fellowship, CIRAD, Montepellier, France
- 2008 – Indo-US visiting professor, American Society of Microbiology
- 2015 – Samanta Chandrasekhar Award in Life Science for 2013, Odisha Vigyana Academy, Department of Science & Technology, Government of Odisha
- 2021, 2022, 2023 - Top 2% scientists of the world ranking in a database prepared by Stanford University

== Bibliography ==
=== Books ===
- Lactic Acid Fermentation of Sweet Potato: Lactic acid fermentation (2010) ISBN 978-3843376570
- Agricultural and Biotechnological Potential of Bacillus subtilis: Beneficial Activity by Bacillus subtilis 2011) ISBN 978-3844311891
- Extracellular Thermostable α-Amylase from Streptomyces erumpens: Production of Calcium - independent α-amylase (2011) ISBN 978-3844397901
- Transforming Agriculture Residues for Sustainable Development (2024)

=== Selected edited books ===
- Microorganisms and Fermentation of Traditional Foods (2014) ISBN 978-1482223088
- Bioethanol Production from Food Crops: Sustainable Sources, Interventions, and Challenges (2019) ISBN 978-0128137666
- Winemaking: Basics and Applied Aspects (2021) ISBN 978-1138490918
- Sustainable Biofuels: Opportunities and Challenges (2021) ISBN 978-0128223925
- Lactic acid Bacteria in Food Biotechnology: Innovation and advances (2022) ISBN 978-0323-898751
- Fruits and Vegetable Wastes: Valorization into bioproducts and platform chemicals (2022) ISBN 978-9811695261

=== Selected articles ===
- Ray, R. C., & Ravi, V. (2005). Post harvest spoilage of sweetpotato in tropics and control measures. Critical reviews in food science and nutrition, 45(7-8), 623–644.
- Swain, M. R., Kar, S., Sahoo, A. K., & Ray, R. C. (2007). Ethanol fermentation of mahula (Madhuca latifolia L.) flowers using free and immobilized yeast Saccharomyces cerevisiae. Microbiological Research, 162(2), 93–98.
- Mohanty, S. K., Behera, S., Swain, M. R., & Ray, R. C. (2009). Bioethanol production from mahula (Madhuca latifolia L.) flowers by solid-state fermentation. Applied Energy, 86(5), 640–644.
- Behera, S., Kar, S., Mohanty, R. C., & Ray, R. C. (2010). Comparative study of bio-ethanol production from mahula (Madhuca latifolia L.) flowers by Saccharomyces cerevisiae cells immobilized in agar agar and Ca-alginate matrices. Applied Energy, 87(1), 96–100.
- Behera, S., Mohanty, R. C., & Ray, R. C. (2010). Comparative study of bio-ethanol production from mahula (Madhuca latifolia L.) flowers by Saccharomyces cerevisiae and Zymomonas mobilis. Applied energy, 87(7), 2352–2355.
- Swain, M. R., Anandharaj, M., Ray, R. C., & Rani, R. P. (2014). Fermented fruits and vegetables of Asia: a potential source of probiotics. Biotechnology research international, 2014.
- Behera, S. S., Ray, R. C., & Zdolec, N. (2018). Lactobacillus plantarum with functional properties: an approach to increase safety and shelf-life of fermented foods. BioMed Research International, 2018.
