= Armand G. Winfield =

Armand Gordon Winfield (1919–2009) was an American artist, plastics engineer, inventor, and educator. He impacted the field of plastics with his work in embedded plastics, synthetic stone, and reinforced plastics, which were used in everything from jewelry to architectural materials. Winfield published over 300 works and obtained 7 patents. His papers and plastic artifacts have been collected by the University of New Mexico Library Center for Southwest Research and Special Collections, the Special Collection Research Center at the Syracuse University Libraries, the Cooper Hewitt Smithsonian Design Museum, the Museum of Design in Plastic (MoDiP) at the Arts University Bournemouth, and the National Museum of American History Archives Center. Winfield's legacy includes his dedication to education, and he was quoted as stating, "The only thing of permanence is the passing of knowledge from one generation to another."

== Education ==
Winfield graduated from Franklin and Marshall College in 1941 with a B.S. degree in geology. He also pursued graduate studies at the University of New Mexico, State University of Iowa, and Washington University (St. Louis).

== Career highlights ==
- Developed a technique for embedding items in acrylic.
- Along with his brother, Rodney, he founded Winfield Fine Art In Jewelry, in New York, NY (1944-1947).
- Produced Crystopal, a decorative plastic made from glass fiber reinforced unsaturated polyester cured with styrene, at Crystopal Ltd. in Hazardville, CT during the 1960s.
- Established Armand G. Winfield, Inc., an international plastics consulting firm, and consulted for 30 years (1964-1994).
- Developed cultured/engineered stones including synthetic granite and marble.
- Developed low cost reinforced plastic housing for developing countries with CARE and the United Nations Industrial Development Organization.
- Developed light weight fiber reinforced plastic sets for the Metropolitan Opera.
- Designed and constructed 13 pavilions and exhibits for the 1964 New York World's Fair.
- Taught and lectured at over 40 colleges and universities including Yale School of Art (1960-61), Pratt Institute Industrial Design Department (1964-70), and University of Massachusetts Lowell (1978-81).
- Elected to the Plastics Pioneers Association (1983).
- Founded the Training and Research Institute for Plastics at the University of New Mexico in 1993.
- Named a Fellow of the Society of Plastics Engineers in 2000.

== Patents and trademarks ==
- Winfield, A. G. Impact Absorbing Laminate and Articles Fabricated Therefrom. US 3,816,234. 1974.
- Winfield, A. G.; Winfield, B. L. Reinforced and Insulating Building Panel. US 3,819,466. 1974.
- Winfield, A. G.; Winfield, B. L. Abrasion Resistant Impact Absorbent Animal Stall Floor and Wall Covering. US 4,333,981. 1982.
- Rede, H.; Winfield, A. G.; Winfield, B. L. Apparatus for Preservation of a Leather Glove. US 4,565,287. 1986.
- Carter, N. A.; Winfield, A. G. Insulated Window Shade Assembly. US 4,625,786. 1986.
- Aguirre, J. A.; Winfield, A. G.; Dennett Jr., J. G. Self-defense/Attack Device. US 4,739,990. 1988.
- DeForest, J. I.; Kaplan, C. D.; Winfield, A. G. Body Lotion Applicator With Applicator Head Pivotally Mounted on Tubular Extension Arm. US 5,240,339. 1993.
- Crystolume Trademark Announcement. Official Gazette of the US Patent Office, United States Government Printing Office, Washington, Vol. 798, January 1964, p.775.
