= Trinseo =

American plastics and materials company

- Formerly: Styron
- Type: Public
- Traded as: NYSE: TSE; Russell 2000 Component
- Industry: Manufacturing
- Founded: June 2010; 16 years ago (as Styron)
- Headquarters: Wayne, Pennsylvania, U.S.
- Key people: Frank Bozich (CEO)
- Products: acrylonitrile butadiene styrene (ABS), acrylonitrile butadiene styrene long glass fiber (ABS LGF), bioplastics, polymethy methacrylate (PMMA), polycarbonate (PC), polycarbonate acrylonitrile butadiene styrene (PC/ABS), polycarbonate polyethylene terephthalate (PC/PET), polypropylene (PP), polystyrene (PS), recycled content containing resins, styrene acrylonitrile resin, thermoplastic elastomers (TPEs), thermoplastic polyurethanes (TPUs)
- Revenue: ▼US$2.97 billion (2025)
- Net income: ▼ −US$546 million (2025)
- Number of employees: 3,400
- Website: Trinseo

Trinseo is a company focusing particularly on the manufacture of plastics and latex binders. Trinseo (formerly known as Styron) was part of the Dow Chemical Company until Dow grouped several of its businesses for potential sale in 2009. In 2010, under the name Styron, those holdings were sold to private equity firm Bain Capital for $1.63 billion. As of 2016, Bain sold all of its stock in Trinseo, grossing $1.69 billion for 37,269,567 shares, resulting in Trinseo's "full independence as a public company".

The company offers a broad line of plastics and latex binders, which are used primarily in the automotive, appliances, electronics, packaging, paper & board, textiles and carpet industries, among others. Trinseo materials are used widely in cars and trucks, home appliances, consumer goods, electronics, electrical & lighting, building & construction, medical supplies, and packaging.

As of June 12, 2014, Trinseo is listed on the New York Stock Exchange as NYSE: TSE. As of March 4, 2019, Frank Bozich became the president and CEO, succeeding Christopher D. Pappas.

== Company history ==
Trinseo's precursor Styron was formed in August 2009 when Dow Chemical Company combined several of its businesses--styrenics; polycarbonate and compounds & blends; Dow Automotive plastics; emulsion polymers (paper and carpet latex); and synthetic rubber – as part of a larger process of identifying and selling non-strategic assets. Several private equity firms bid on Styron, including TPG Capital, Apollo Management, and Lotte Group. On March 2, 2010, Bain Capital announced that it would purchase the newly formed company for $1.63 billion, with Dow retaining a 7.5% stake. The sale was finalized in June 2010.

The name Trinseo was chosen in 2012. By February 2015, all legal entities worldwide had changed to the name Trinseo.

As of 2016, Bain sold all of its stock in Trinseo, grossing $1.69 billion for 37,269,567 shares, resulting in Trinseo's "full independence as a public company". In November 2017, Trinseo started a MAGNUM ABS production line manufacturing plant at the Zhangjiagang, China site.

In March 2023, over 8,000 gallons of "latex finishing material" leaked into Otter Creek, a tributary of the Delaware River, from a Trinseo plant in Bucks County, Pennsylvania. Well over a million residents of nearby areas—including more than half of the city of Philadelphia—were at least temporarily urged not to drink their tap water because of potential toxic contamination from the leak, causing widespread panic and shortages of bottled water. Work at the plant, which had been responsible for at least four other contamination incidents since 2010, was temporarily halted by Trinseo. Shares of the company fell after the leak.

On May 26, 2026, Trinseo filed for Chapter 11 bankruptcy protection, citing weaker volumes and an unsustainable debt burden. The company is currently negotiating with lenders to reduce its debt and cut its interest costs. Trinseo listed assets and liabilities between $1 billion to $10 billion.

== Financial ==
Trinseo is headquartered in Wayne, Pennsylvania. Trinseo has approximately 3,400 employees in North America, Europe and Asia Pacific.

Styron was the #67 ranked chemical company globally in 2011, posting sales of $6.193B. As of 2013, Trinseo's annual revenue was approximately $5.54 billion. As of 2017 the company reported a net income of $310 million and an adjusted EBITDA guidance of $580 million.

Trinseo owns a 50% stake in North American polystyrene producer American Styrenics LLC, a joint venture based in the Woodlands, Texas. Trinseo previously held a 50% stake in Sumika Styron Polycarbonate Limited, but sold this to Sumitomo Chemical in 2017. In 2016 Trinseo signed an agreement to sell its Brazil-based businesses to Qoppar Participacoes Ltda.

As of 2017, Trinseo announced its first acquisition, the Italian plastics firm Applicazioni Plastiche Industriali. API's softer plastics will complement Trinseo's harder plastics. On September 27, 2017, Trinseo opened a new research and development center in Terneuzen, Netherlands.

== New York Stock Exchange ==
Trinseo's IPO debuted on June 12, 2014, listed as NYSE: TSE. All shares were sold in the offering, and raised over $190 million.

== Products and applications ==
- The company produces polystyrene co-polymers (ABS, SAN) and expanded polystyrene primarily used in packaging, food applications and home appliances.
- The company produces styrene butadiene latex, which is applied as a coating on coated paper.
- The company produces functionalized solution styrene butadiene rubber (SSBR) for use in high performance tires, and opened a new 50,000 metric ton production unit for production of SSBR in Schkopau, Germany in late 2012. They also produces polycarbonate compounds and blends primarily used in automotive applications, medical devices and LED lighting.
- The company's LGF polypropylene resin was instrumental in Ford Motor Company's development of an innovative headlamp bracket, which was awarded a 2012 Society of Plastics Engineers Innovation for Safety Award. Their material solutions have also contributed to the design of the first, "thermoplastic lift-gate solution" in the new Renault Clio.

== See also ==
- Materials science
- Rubber technology
- Styrene
- Polystyrene
- Plastic
- Latex
