= Vani Vihar =

Coordinates: 20.304179°N 85.839754°E

Vani Vihar is the most famous centre of education in the city of Bhubaneswar, Odisha. The campus of the Utkal University is located at Vani Vihar. The University Law College and the Directorate of Distance and Continuing Education (DDCE) are also located here. Vani Vihar has also a Railway Station named after it.

== Etymology and history ==
Vani in Sanskrit means "word" or "knowledge" and Vihara means "abode". Vani is also another name of Saraswati, the Hindu Goddess of Learning. As such, Vani Vihar literally means the abode of learning. It may be noted that the campus of all the prominent universities in Odisha are similarly named. Sambalpur University is located at Jyoti Vihar, Berhampur University is located at Bhanja Vihar, whereas Fakir Mohan University is located as Vyasa Vihar.

The place attained prominence after the campus of Utkal University, the oldest university of Odisha, was shifted here from Cuttack in the year 1963. The university campus is situated in an area of 399 acres.

== Institutes of prominence ==
The Odisha chapters of Institute of Minerals and Materials Technology, the Institute of Physics, Bhubaneswar and the famous Pathani Samanta Planetarium and Observatory are located at Vani Vihar.

== Anti-social activities and student unrest ==
Due to the proximity to many premier educational institutions, Vani Vihar frequently experiences student unrest and acts of violence. As a safeguard, modern security gadgets and fortification efforts have been initiated in Vani Vihar since 2010. A "Save Vani Vihar" campaign has been initiated by the Alumni Association of Utkal University to flush out anti-social elements from the campus and nearby areas of Vani Vihar.

== See also ==
- Utkal University
- Sambalpur University
- Berhampur University
- Fakir Mohan University
