= Rupa Dash =

Indian entrepreneur and filmmaker

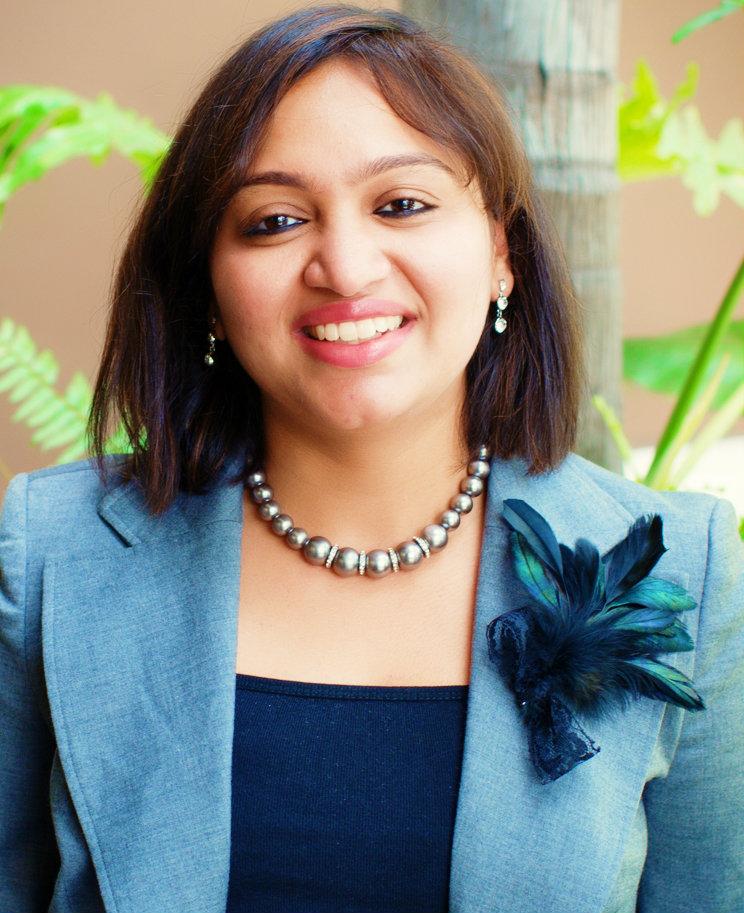
- Born: Rupa Dash; Cuttack, Odisha, India

Rupa Dash is an Indian entrepreneur and filmmaker. She was born in Cuttack, Odisha and lives in Los Angeles. An ardent advocate for social entrepreneurship, democracy building and leadership development for women, she was the first Indian American Managing Director of World's Largest Women Entrepreneurship Network. She has been leading eWomenNetwork, Los Angeles to assist women in building business relationships and finding new ways scaling business. She holds a bachelor's degree in Business Management from Utkal University and Executive Program in International Business, International Trade from IIFT, New Delhi. She also studied entrepreneurship from Anderson School Management, UCLA, Los Angeles.

She is the youngest woman to receive the National Award for the Best Telecom Brand Market, 2012 by the Ministry of Telecom and United Nation, International Telecom Union (ITU) in India. She runs two successful media and entertainment companies in Los Angeles. In 2014 she Co-Founded World Woman Foundation with Upendra K. Kar. The Foundation is widely recognized "Premier Women's Leadership Institute" to support, promote and build legacy of women leadership in areas of Business, Entertainment, Science and Technology for gender harmony.
