= 2023 Delaware River chemical spill =

2023 ecological disaster in Pennsylvania

The 2023 Delaware River chemical spill was a failure of equipment that occurred on March 24, 2023, at the Trinseo Altuglas chemical plant in Bristol, Pennsylvania in the United States, which resulted in a leak of between 8,100 and 12,000 gallons of butyl acetate, ethyl acetate, and methyl methacrylate into Otter Creek, a tributary of the Delaware River.

== Description of the incident ==
On March 24, 2023, the Trinseoplant in Bristol, Pennsylvania in the United States had an equipment failure that resulted in a leak of between 8,100 and 12,000 gallons of butyl acetate, ethyl acetate, and methyl methacrylate into Otter Creek, a tributary of the Delaware River.

During the aftermath, multiple members of the news media drew comparisons to the 2023 East Palestine train derailment because one of the chemicals spilled, butyl acetate, was a contaminant in both incidents. A map that was released by city officials labeled areas east of the Schuylkill River as potentially impacted, but said that areas west of the Schuylkill would not be impacted by the spill. The chemicals spilled were all sourced from a water-soluble latex polymer solution.

== Government response ==
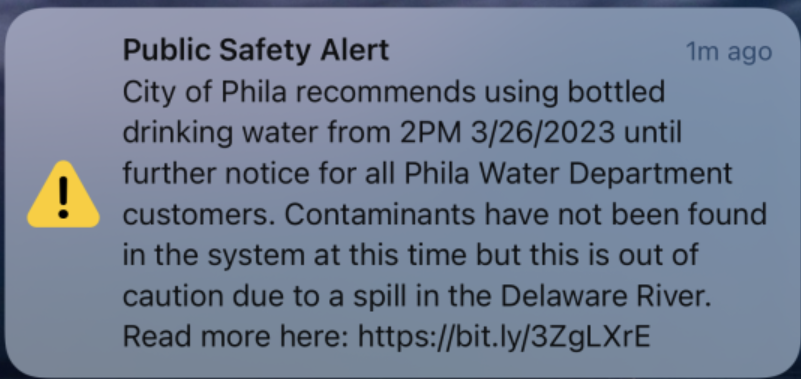
Public Safety Alert from March 26, 2023, that alerted Philadelphia residents to avoid using tap water

On March 26, emergency alerts were sent to the mobile phones of residents of the nearby city of Philadelphia, informing them that there had been a chemical spill into the water supply and advising them to avoid drinking tap water until further notice. Another alert was later sent out, saying that pre-treated water prior to the spill would allow water to be drinkable in the city's tap throughout at least the coming Monday, and that it was not necessary to drink from bottled water.

On March 27, Philadelphia Mayor Jim Kenney claimed in a tweet that outgoing water from the Baxter Drinking Water Treatment Plant was safe to drink. An advisory on March 27 then stated that the water supply would be safe to stockpile from the time of that alert until 3:30 p.m. the next day.

After the second update, the city encouraged residents to store tap water before the deadline.

A third advisory was issued on March 28 stating that the water from Baxter had once again tested safe to drink, and that water would be guaranteed safe to drink until midnight on March 29.

A final advisory was issued later that night, guaranteeing that the drinking water was not contaminated by the spill.

Mayor Kenney released a statement later that day saying that the threat had passed. City officials stated that they would further assess any possible enhancements to infrastructure to prevent future spills.

Prior to the determination of clean water in the river, townships such as Mantua cut off their water supply that fed in from the Delaware River.

After city officials were informed of the spill, they shut off the intake pipe to prevent further contamination of the river. Continuous testing was done within the Philadelphia water system to track for any possible contaminants from the spill.

Many nearby counties in southeastern Pennsylvania, as well as in western New Jersey also began testing their water supply as a precaution.

Officials from the Pennsylvania Department of Environmental Protection stated that there had not been any discernable effect on the fish and wildlife of the area. The U.S. Coast Guard reported that at least 8,100 U.S. gallons (31,000 liters) of chemical had been spilled into the river, with a possible maximum being 12,000 U.S. gallons (45,000 liters). The EPA, NOAA, PDEP, and PFBC also visited the site to monitor for ecological damage and health risks.

Aqua Pennsylvania and New Jersey American Water were unable to find traces of the chemicals in the water supply.

Following the incident, Mike Carroll, director of Philadelphia's Office of Transportation, stated that it was likely that no contaminants would enter the tap water system of Philadelphia.

== Cause and internal investigation ==
An internal investigation by the company reportedly revealed that the cause of the spill had been a failure of the equipment at the facility, creating an overflow of chemical that caused a pipe to burst. The chemicals then leaked into a storm drain that led to the river.

On March 29, an investigation on the behalf of Trinseo investors was announced regarding a potential violation of the Securities Act of 1933.

== Public reaction and effects on health ==
Many citizens of Philadelphia within the jurisdiction of the Baxter Drinking Water Treatment Plant were frustrated with the short term notice of the leak, leading many to rush to buy bottled water, which depleted the supply in many stores within minutes.

American conservationist Gary Belan subsequently released a statement in which he demanded that further attention be given to the spill, and that any adverse effects caused by the contamination by rectified by Trinseo.

Water providers stated that there were no severe health risks following the polluting of the river, and professor of environmental health at Johns Hopkins Keeve Nachman speculated that short-term ingestion of the contaminated waters wouldn't have any long-term impacts. Bucks County health officials corroborated the claims of experts, saying that the spill contaminants would be non-toxic to humans.

Philadelphia Secretary of Transportation Mike Carroll also said that it would be unlikely that any of the contaminants would enter the water system

== See also ==
Delaware Riverkeeper Network
