= Christopher D. Pappas =

CEO of Trinseo

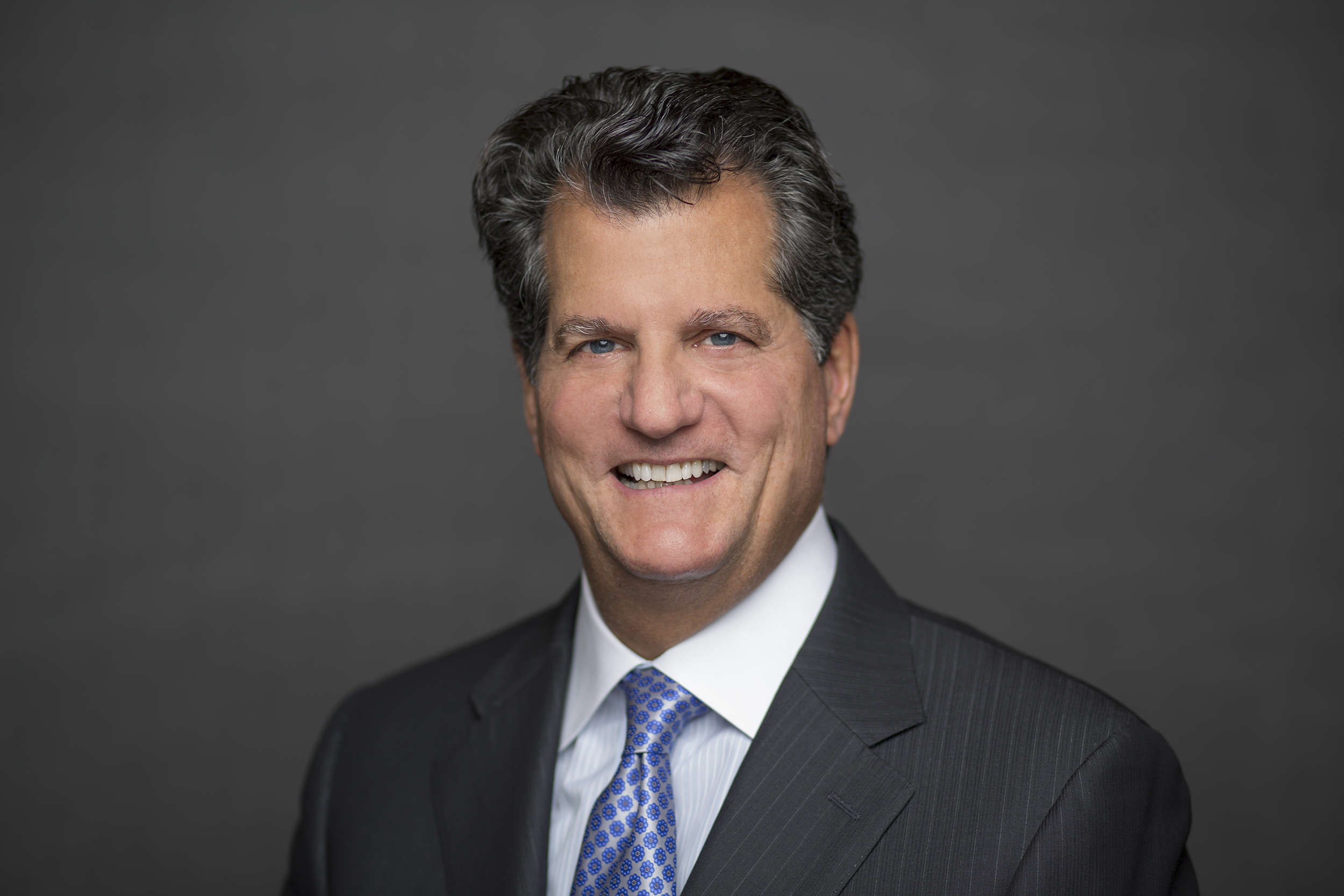
- Chris Pappas, 2016
- Education: Georgia Institute of Technology, Wharton School of the University of Pennsylvania
- Known for: Past President and CEO of Trinseo
- Spouse: Susan G. Pappas
- Scientific career
- Fields: Materials
- Workplaces: Nova Chemicals Corporation, Dow Chemical Company, Trinseo

Christopher Daniel Pappas is the Founder and CEO of CDP Consulting LLC and a former chemical industry CEO. He is the chair of the board of directors of Klöckner Pentaplast, and a current member of the board of directors of Hexion, IPS Corporation, and Innovative Chemical Products Group. Pappas also currently serves as an advisor to various private equity firms on industrial and chemical industry transactions.

== Education ==
Pappas earned a Bachelor of Science degree in civil engineering at Georgia Institute of Technology and a Master of Business Administration from the Wharton School of the University of Pennsylvania.

== Career ==
Pappas entered the chemicals and plastics industry when he joined the Dow Chemical Company in 1978. He became vice president of Ethylene Elastomers for DuPont Dow Elastomers LLC in 1996 and commercial vice president in 1999.

In 2000 he joined Nova Chemicals Corporation, where he held positions including senior vice president and president of Styrenics (July 2000 – September 2006); president and chief operations officer (October 2006 – April 2009); and president and chief executive officer (May 2009 – November 2009).

In 2010, Pappas became president and chief executive officer when the Dow Chemical Company spun off a group of its businesses and assets as Styron (later Trinseo). Pappas retired from the position of President and CEO of Trinseo on March 4, 2019. He remained with Trinseo as Special Advisor to the CEO until July 2019. He was succeeded by Frank Bozich.

Pappas is credited for his leadership in establishing the company's vision and culture, and was awarded an ACS Leadership Award for Outstanding Corporate Reinvention in 2017.

He has served on a number of boards, including those of Univar (2015-2023) (NYSE: UNVR), FirstEnergy (2011-2022) (NYSE: FE), Trinseo (2010-2020) (NYSE: TSE), Allegheny Energy (2008–2011) (NYSE: AYE), Nova Chemicals (2007-2009) (NYSE: NCX), and Methanex (2002-2006) (NYSE: MEOH). Pappas served on the Executive Committee of the Society of Chemical Industry America and chaired the organization in 2017.

Since 2015, Pappas has served on the external advisor board of the School of Civil & Environmental Engineering at Georgia Tech. He and his wife Susan, both civil engineers from Georgia Tech, have established the Susan G. and Christopher D. Pappas Professorship in the School of Civil and Environmental Engineering, first held beginning in 2016 by Patricia Mokhtarian.

== Awards ==
- 2020, SCI America Chemical Industry Award, Issued by the Society of Chemical Industry America
- 2018, voted top CEO among mid-cap publicly traded chemical companies in Institutional Investor's yearly survey of top executives.
- 2017, Leadership Award for Outstanding Corporate Reinvention, American Chemical Society’s New York Section, for the "visionary leadership needed to transform a collection of separate commodity businesses into a unified company with a clear strategy and vision".
- 2015, Academy of Distinguished Engineering Alumni Award, Georgia Institute of Technology
