= Acrylic embedment =

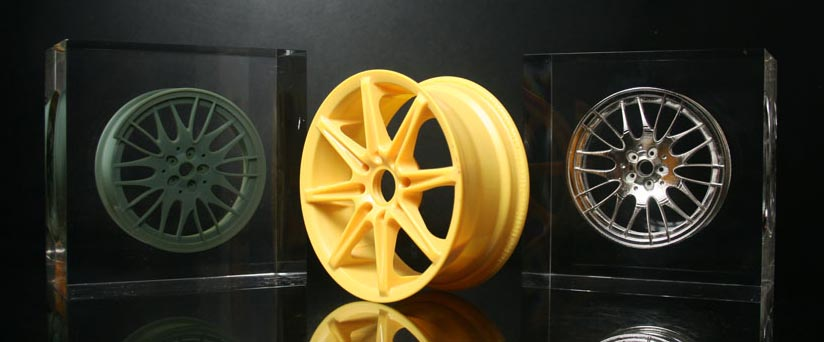
Encapsulated 3-D-printed objects

Acrylic embedment is a process of encapsulating objects into cast poly(methyl methacrylate). The process is used for preserving specimens, encapsulating electronics, and making decorative items such as trophies (deal toys) and jewellery.

== History ==
In the early 1940s, Armand G. Winfield was interested in preserving biological and geological specimens. He developed a method for embedding such specimens in clear acrylic plastic, and by 1945, his process was used to mass-produce objects embedded in acrylic. In addition to preserving specimens, Winfield’s work included encapsulating electronics in acrylic and the production of acrylic jewelry.

== Process ==
=== Pouring ===
The process starts with two basic ingredients, an acrylic resin powder polymer and clear liquid monomer. The polymer and monomer are mixed together in specific proportions. The result is a thick, opaque liquid. The mixture is hand poured into molds and allowed to partially harden. Objects to be embedded are then hand placed into the acrylic layer. Another layer is poured over the embedded object and the acrylic is again allowed to harden.

During this stage, the liquid acrylic is an opaque, milky white. It is very difficult to center objects on multiple levels when the objects below cannot be clearly seen. Because these embedded objects are placed by hand, no two acrylic embedments are ever exactly alike.

=== Curing ===
After the acrylic has hardened, the molds are placed into an oven. There, heat cures and pressure (exceeding 12 atmospheres) compresses the air bubbles to completely harden the embedment. This curing process may take up to seven hours. After cooling, the acrylic embedments are removed from the molds and the sizing process begins. All acrylic parts are cast oversized to allow for shrinkage, which varies from part to part. Three steps are taken to size the embedments.

=== Sanding ===
The parts are ground down to size by hand on large industrial sanders. A coarse grit belt is used first, followed by a medium grit belt. A final sanding with a fine grit belt makes it easier to polish the sanded acrylic. Variations occur in this sizing process since it is all done by hand.

=== Polishing ===
Polishing is the next step in the process. It is mostly done by hand. This brings out the luster and high gloss of the acrylic not previously seen during production. A rough buffing is administered to remove all sanding lines. A final polishing then brings out the bright crystal-like finish. The production of the acrylic embedment is completed.

=== Inspection ===
The final phase now begins. Each embedment is carefully hand wiped and visually inspected. If flaws or any other defects are detected, the part is returned for additional finishing or rejected for recycling. After passing through inspection, each part is individually bagged and boxed. This entire procedure makes the result more expensive but because of its glossy look an acrylic embedment is very much in demand.

== See also ==
Because of the high amount of technical knowledge required, the total number of manufacturers remains small. These include:

Engraving, Awards & Gifts, Electron Microscopy Sciences, and USAcrylic Awards.

More information can be found here: Engravers Journal and USAcrylic Awards..
