= Gordon E. Moore Medal (SCI) =

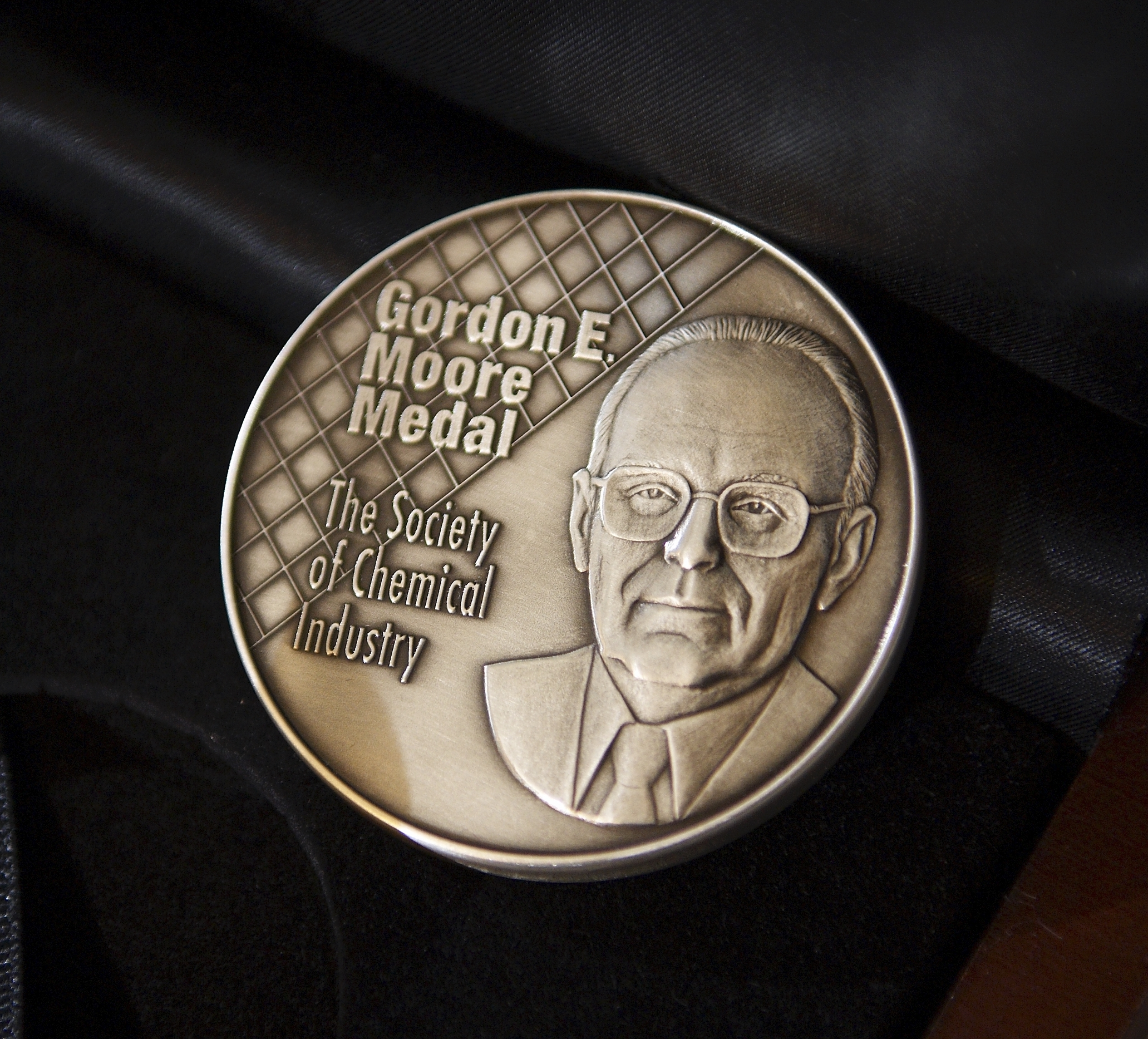
- Awarded for: Given annually for early career innovation
- Date: 2004
- Presented by: Society of Chemical Industry (American Section)

The Gordon E. Moore Medal is an award given yearly by the Society of Chemical Industry (SCI America) to someone who has displayed early career success involving innovation in chemical industries. Success is judged in terms of both market impact and effects on quality of life of their work.

== Recipients ==
- 2026, Lyndsay Leal, (Dow)
- 2025, Linqian Feng, (Eastman Chemical Company)
- 2024, Caleb Funk (DuPont)
- 2023, Kaoru Aou (Dow)
- 2022, Kevin Maloney (Merck)
- 2021, Carla Pereira (ExxonMobil)
- 2020, Wei Wang (PPG)
- 2019, John Sworen (Chemours Company)
- 2018, Steven Swier (Dow Corning)
- 2017, Melinda H. Keefe (Dow)
- 2016, Abhishek Roy (Dow)
- 2015, John A. McCauley (Merck)
- 2014, Andrew E. Taggi (DuPont)
- 2013, Jerzy Klosin (Dow)
- 2012, Dean E. Rende (Honeywell)
- 2011, Doron Levin (ExxonMobil)
- 2010, Emmett Crawford (Eastman Chemical Company)
- 2009, Emma Parmee (Merck & Co.)
- 2008, Edmund M. Carnahan (Dow)
- 2007, Paul A. Sagel (Procter & Gamble)
- 2006, Jonathan M. McConnachie (ExxonMobil)
- 2005, Jeffery John Hale (Merck & Co.)
- 2004, George G. Barclay (Rohm and Haas)

== Gallery ==
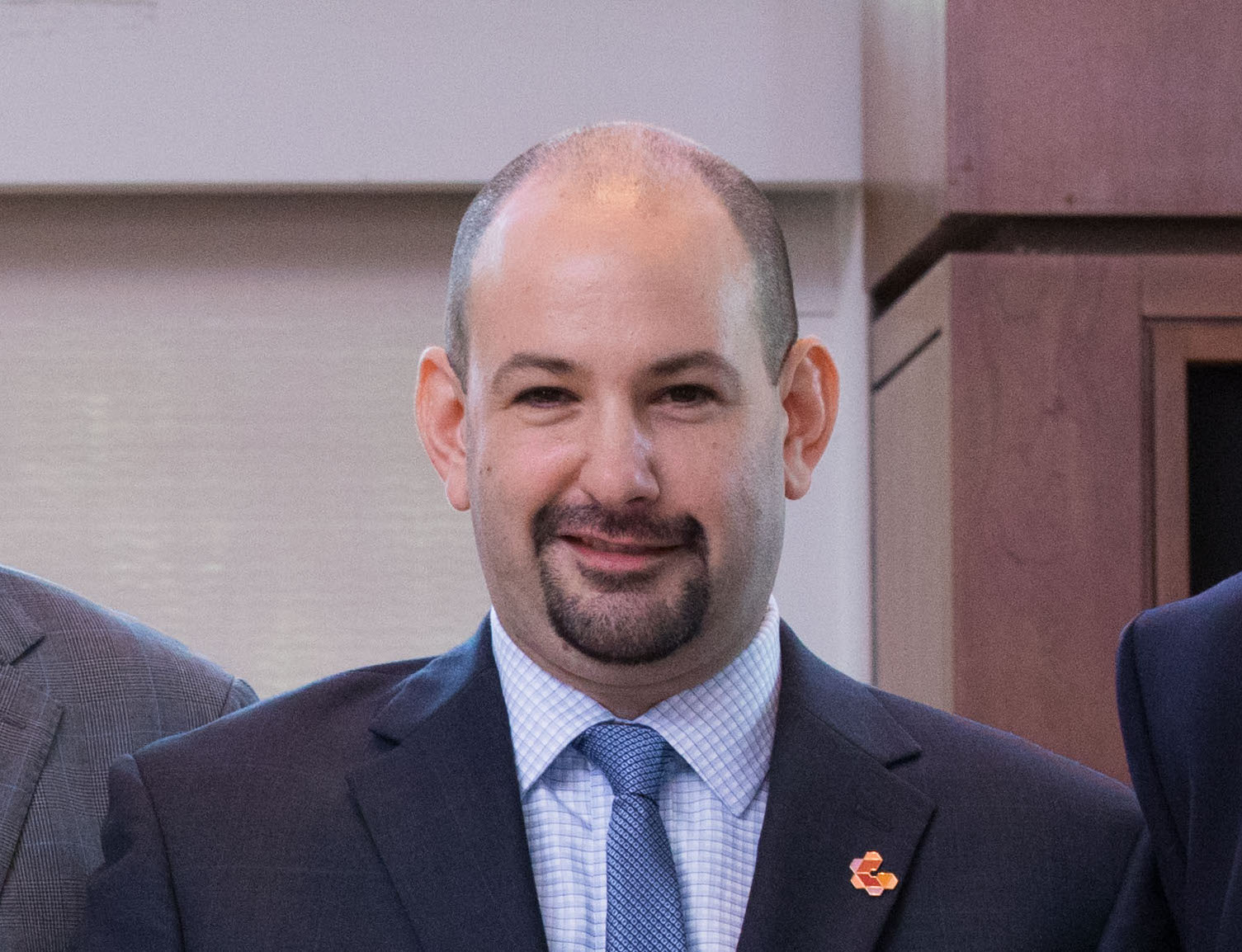
John Sworen, 2019

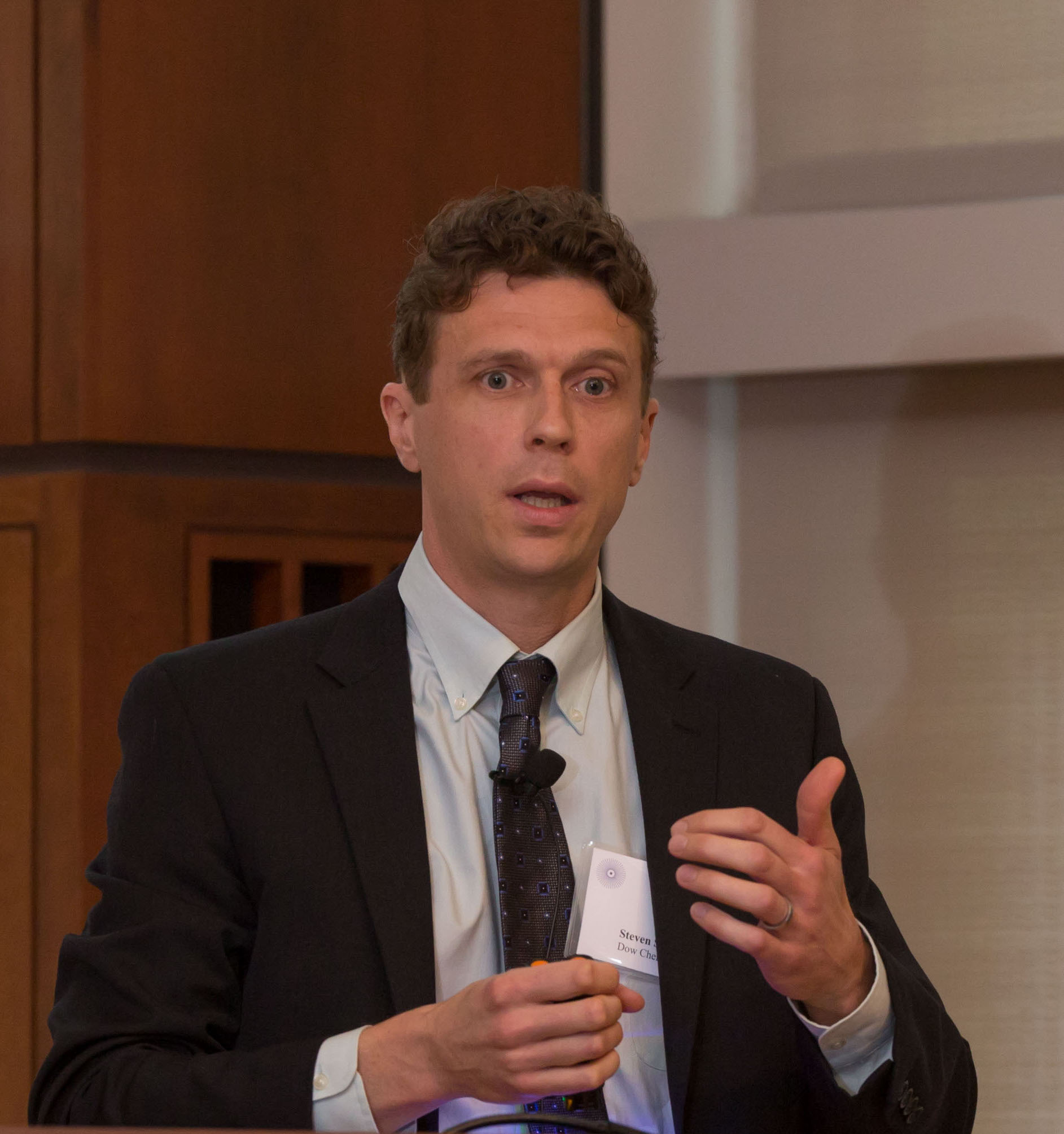
Steven Swier, 2018

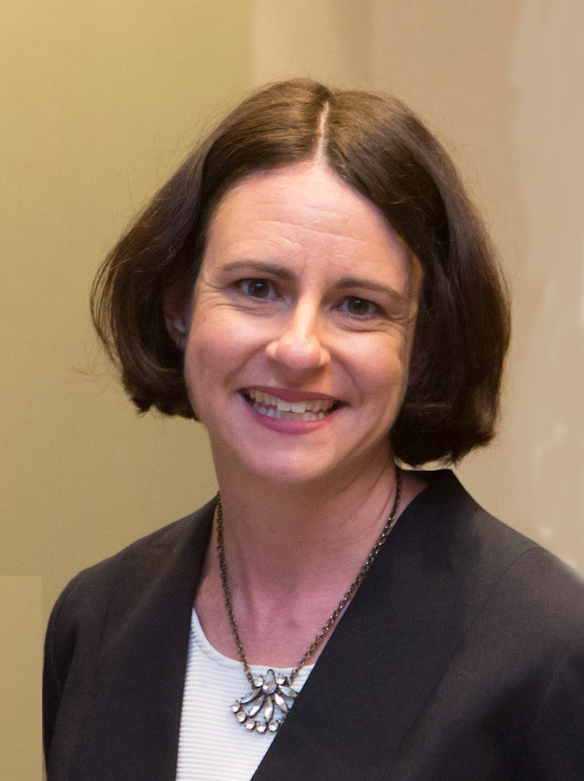
Melinda H. Keefe, 2017

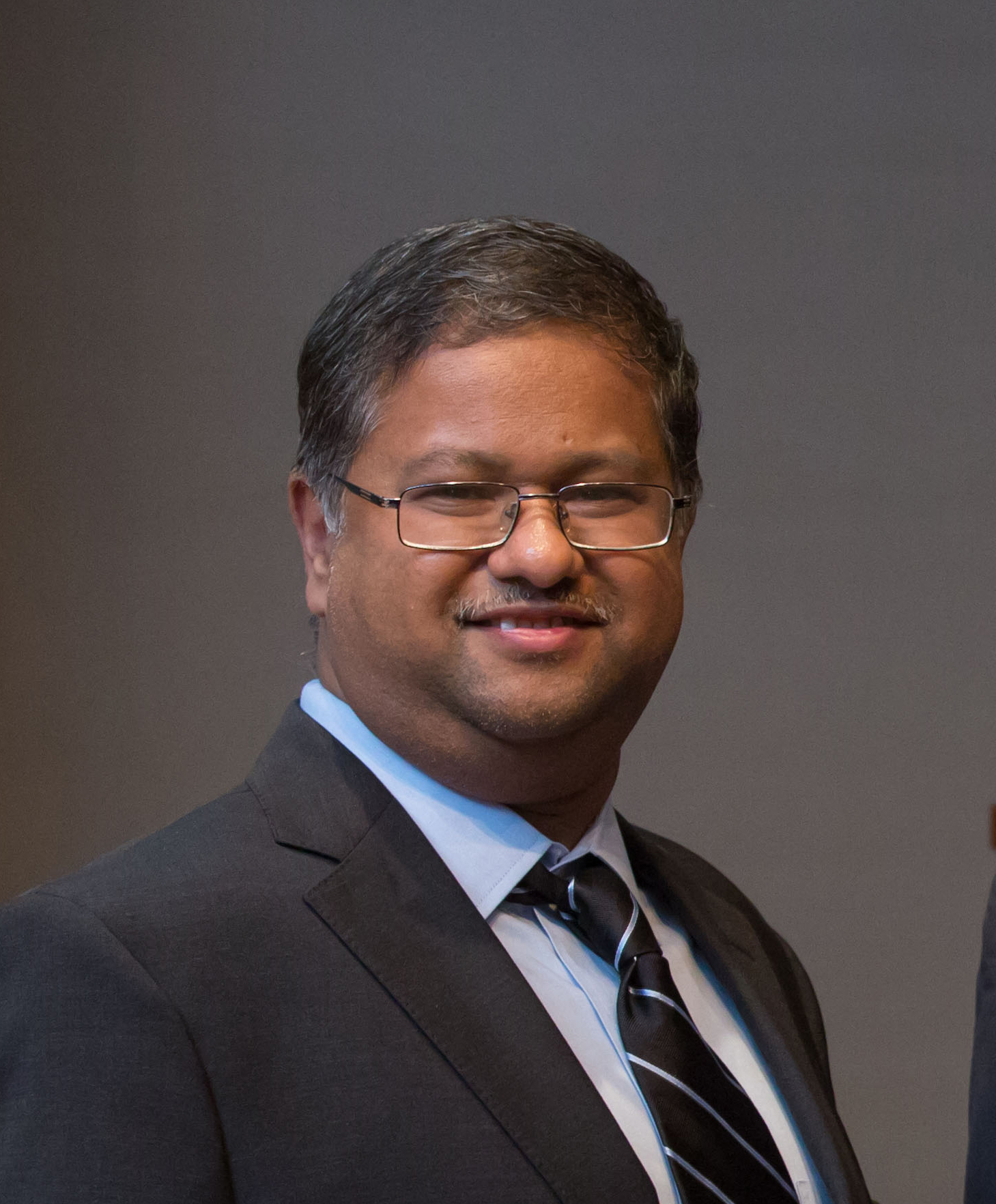
Abhishek Roy, 2016

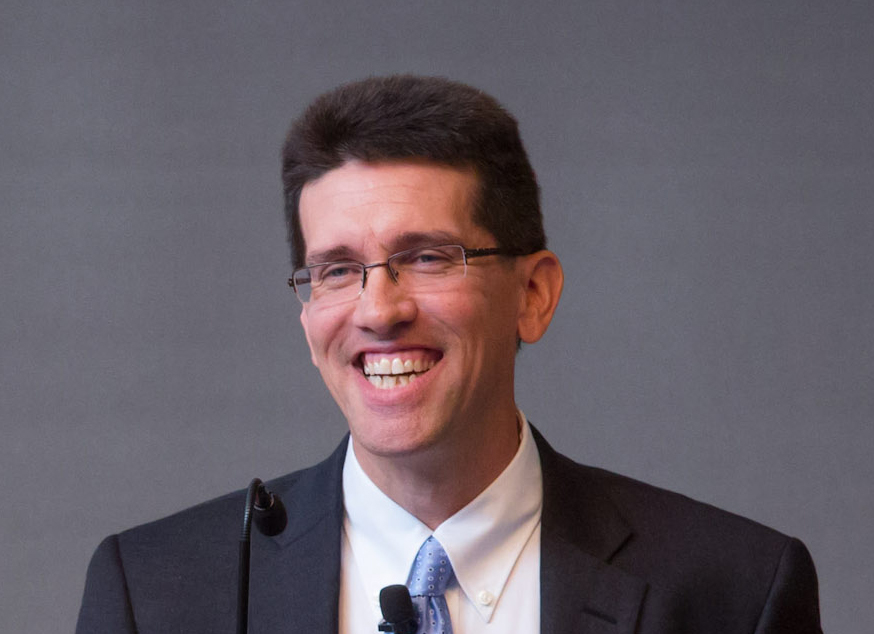
John A. McCauley, 2015

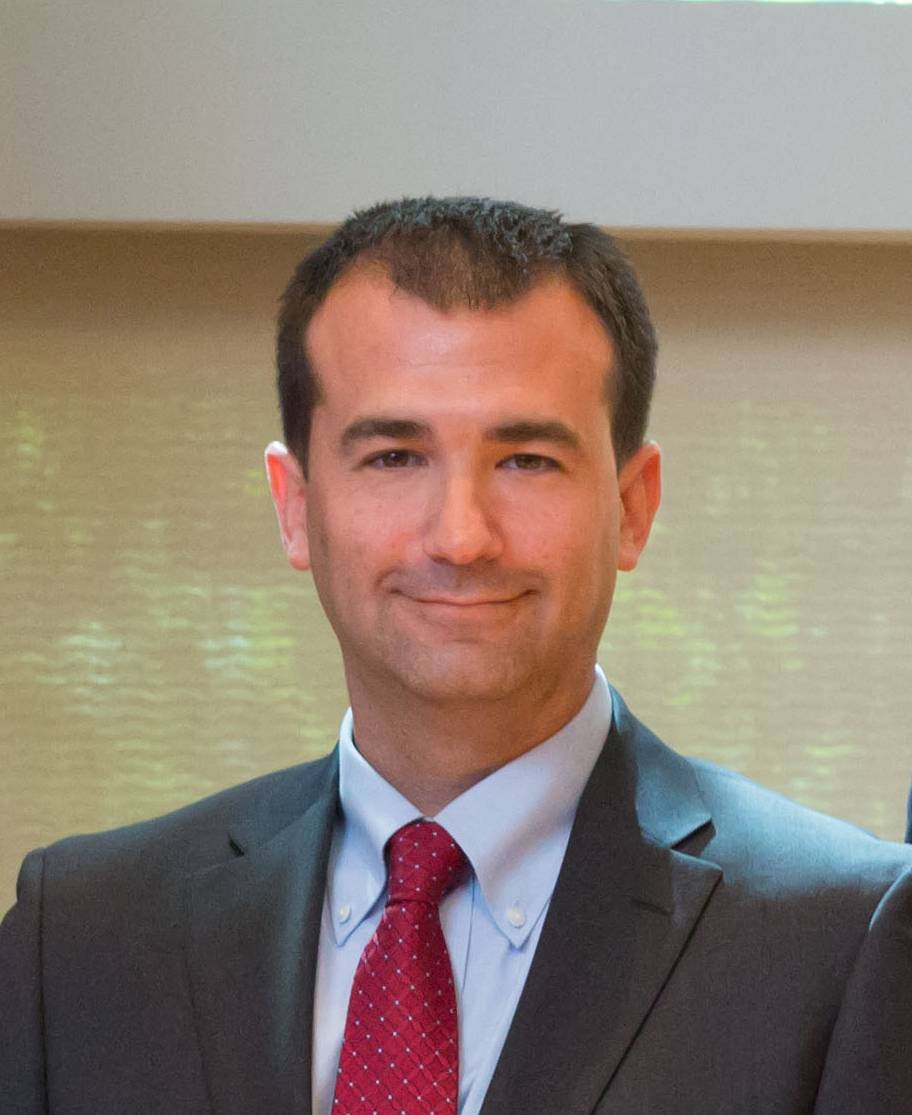
Andrew Taggi, 2014

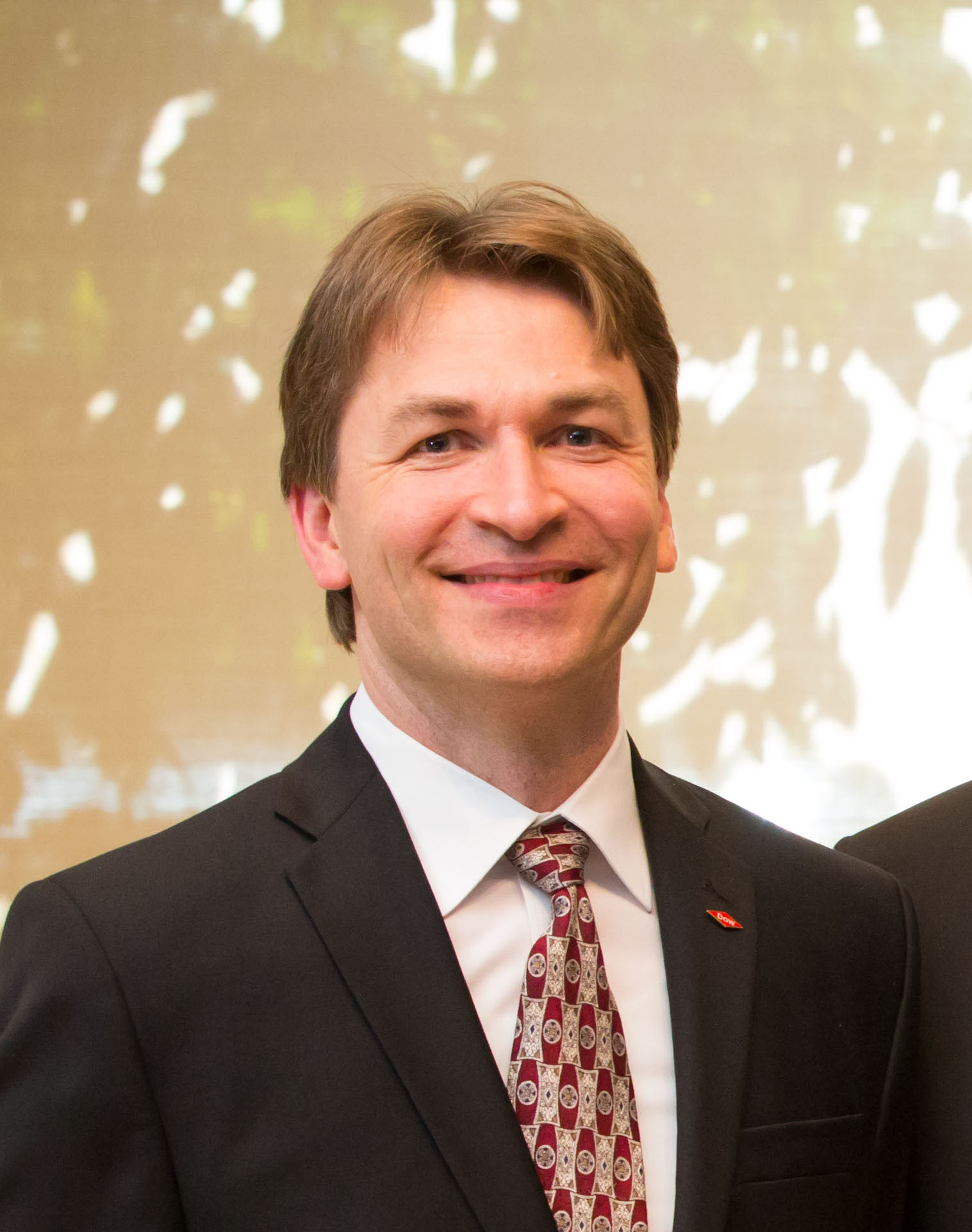
Jerzy Klosin, 2013

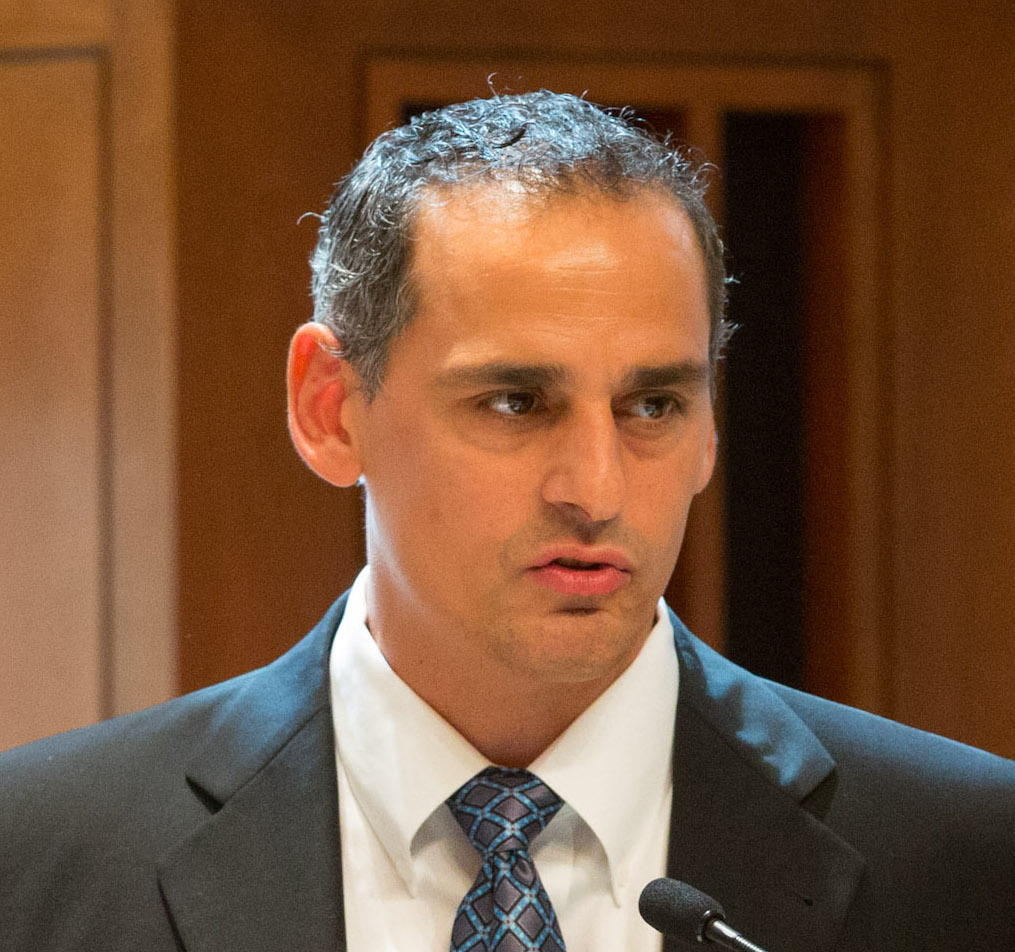
Dean E. Rende, 2012

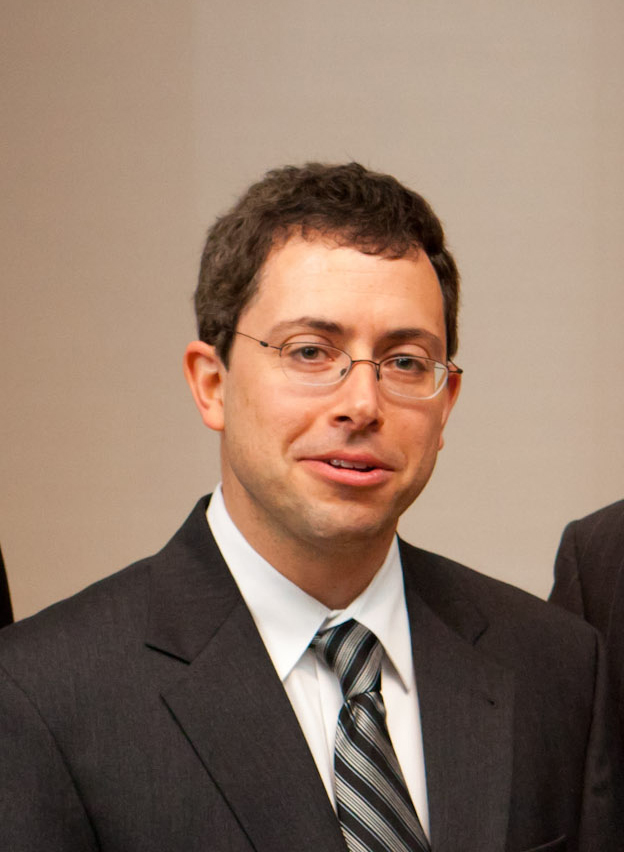
Doron Levin, 2011

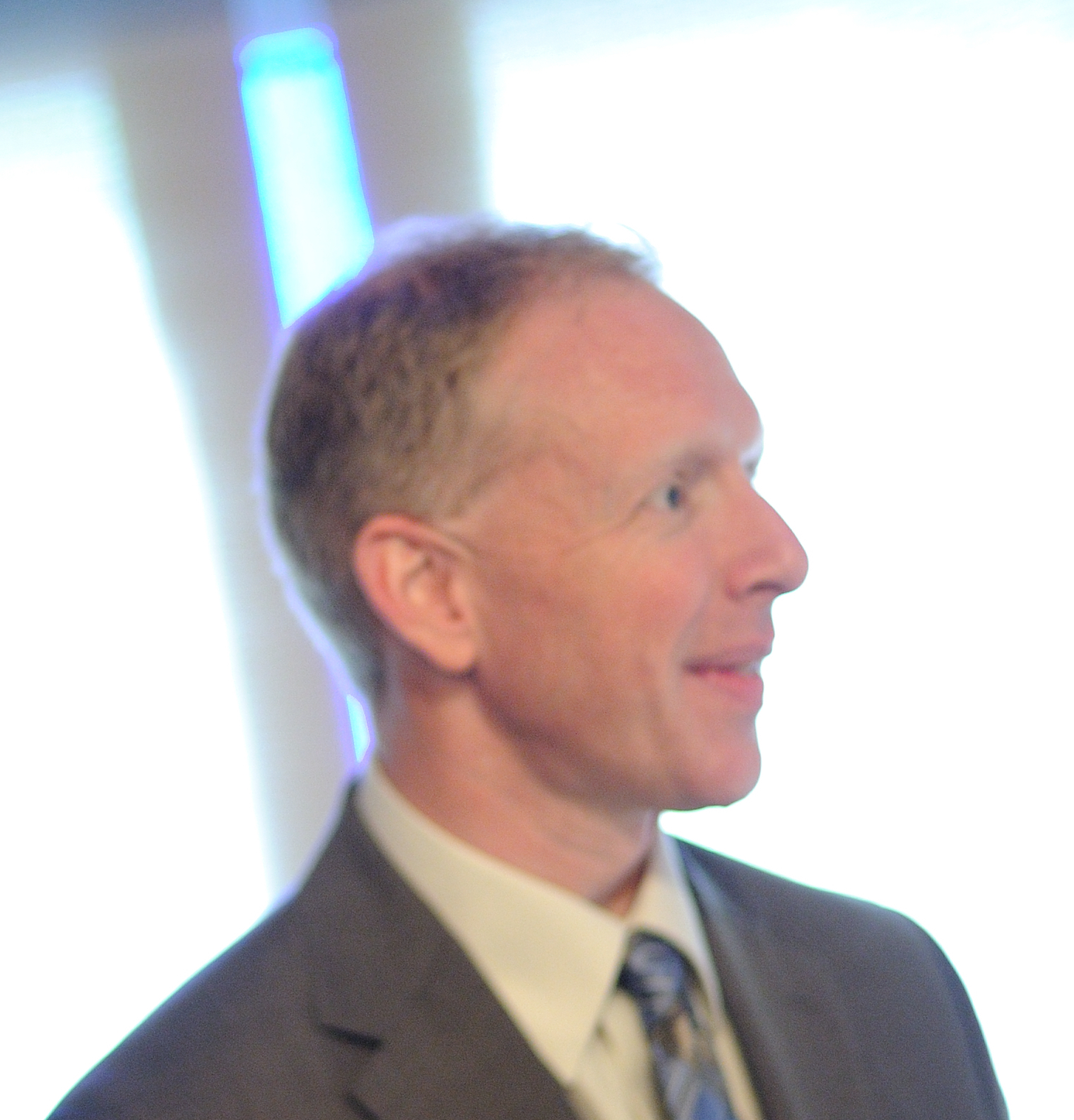
Emmett Crawford, 2010

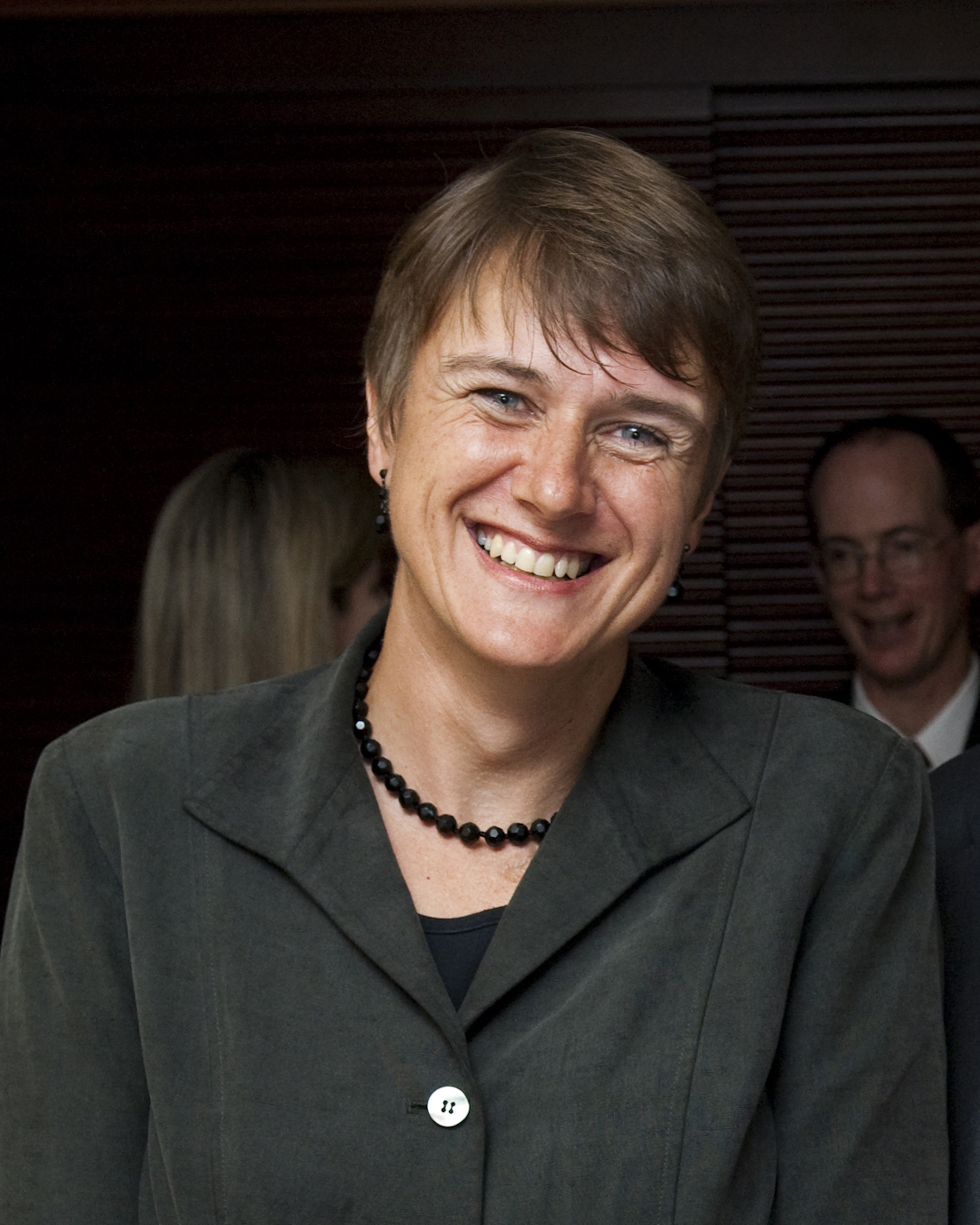
Emma Parmee, 2009

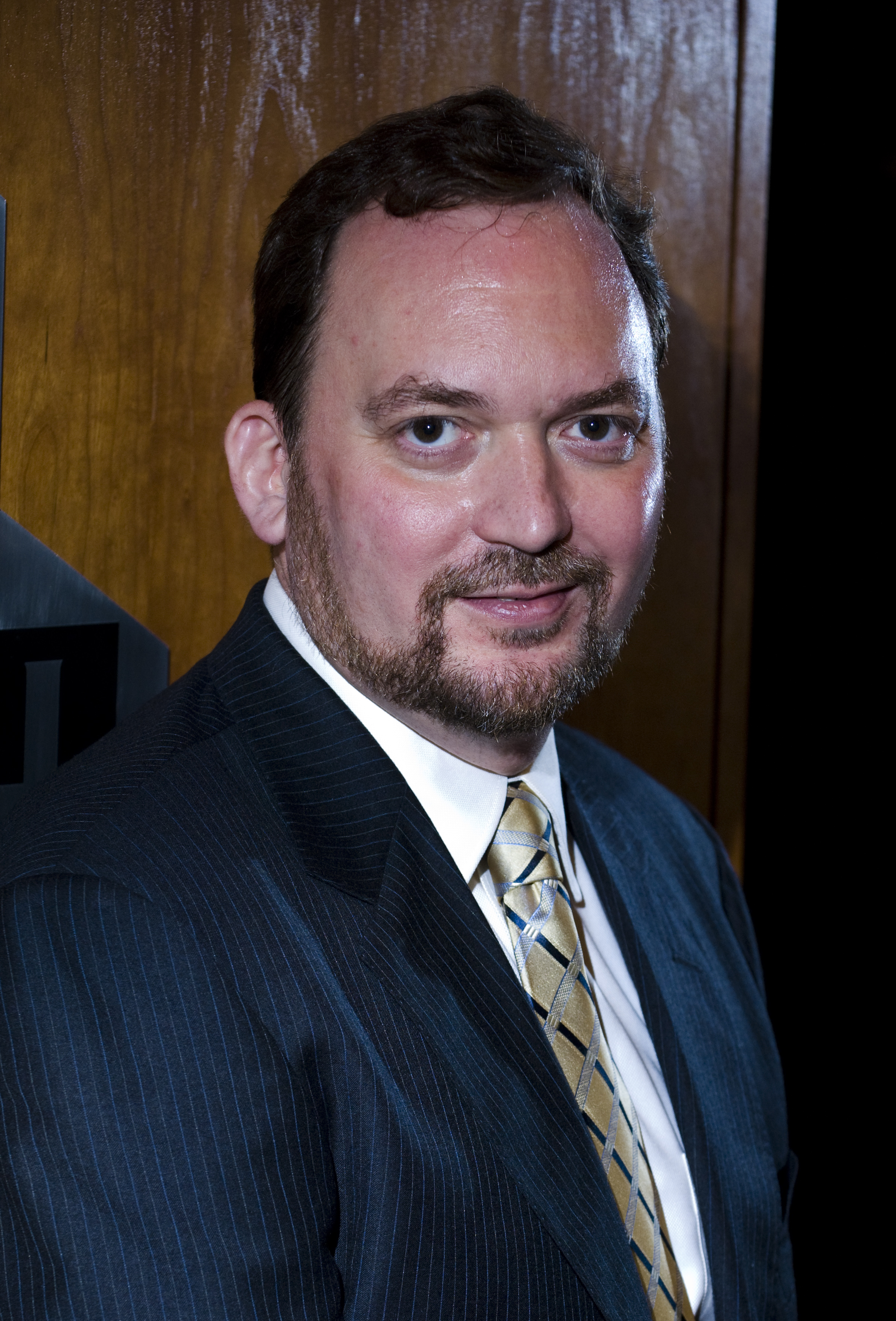
Edmund Carnahan, 2008

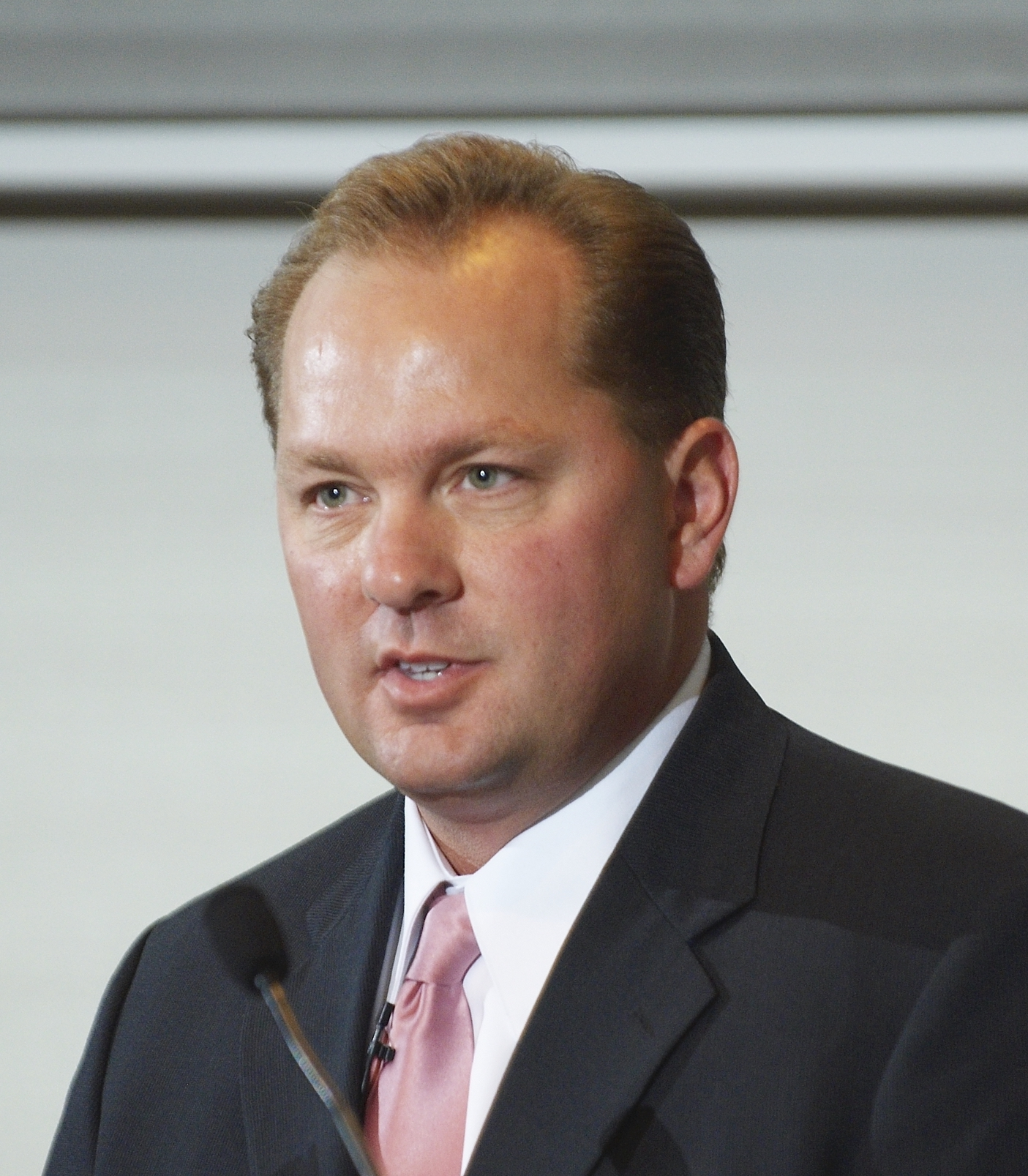
Paul Sagel, 2007

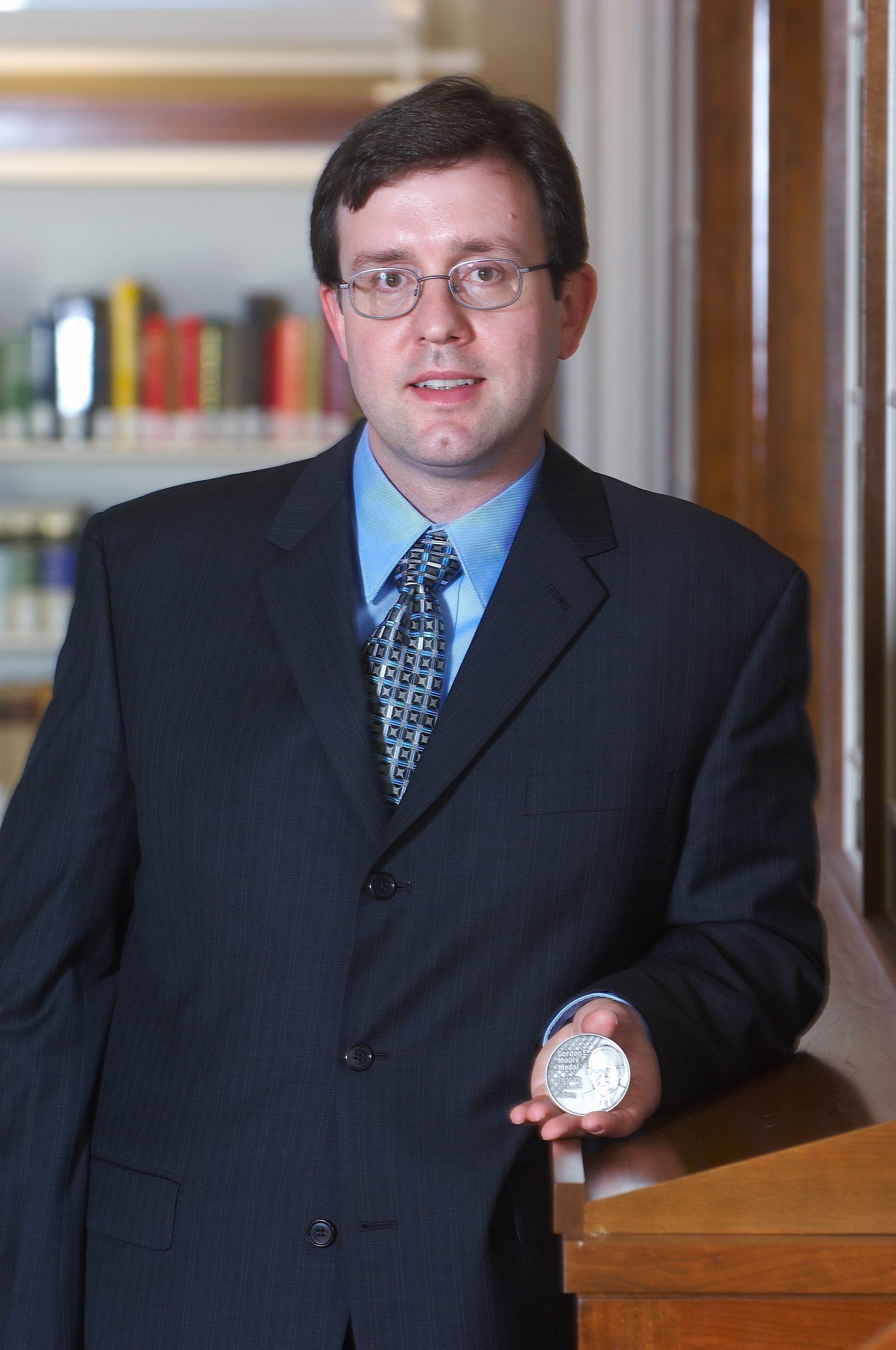
Jonathan McConnachie, 2006

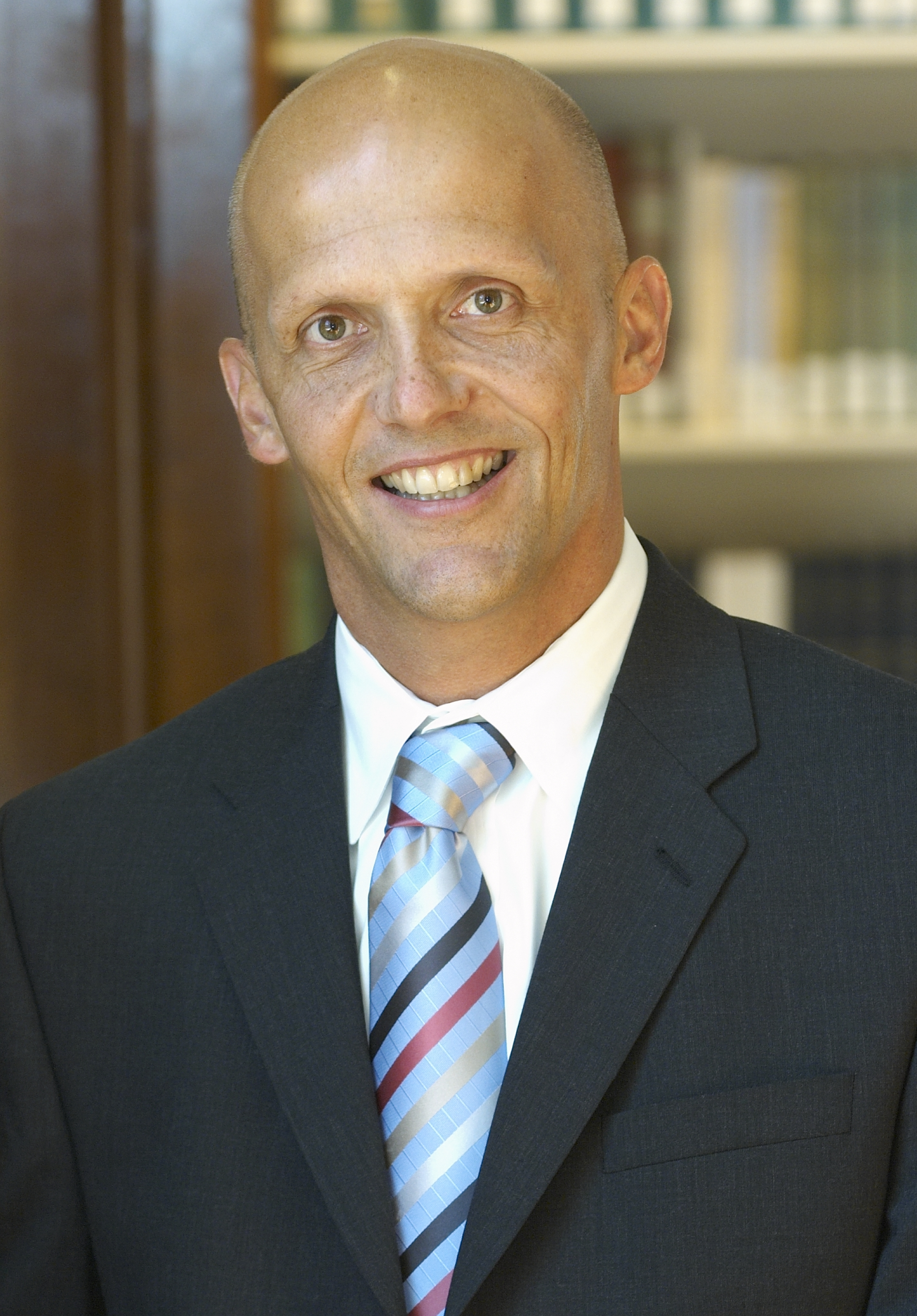
Jeffrey Hale, 2005

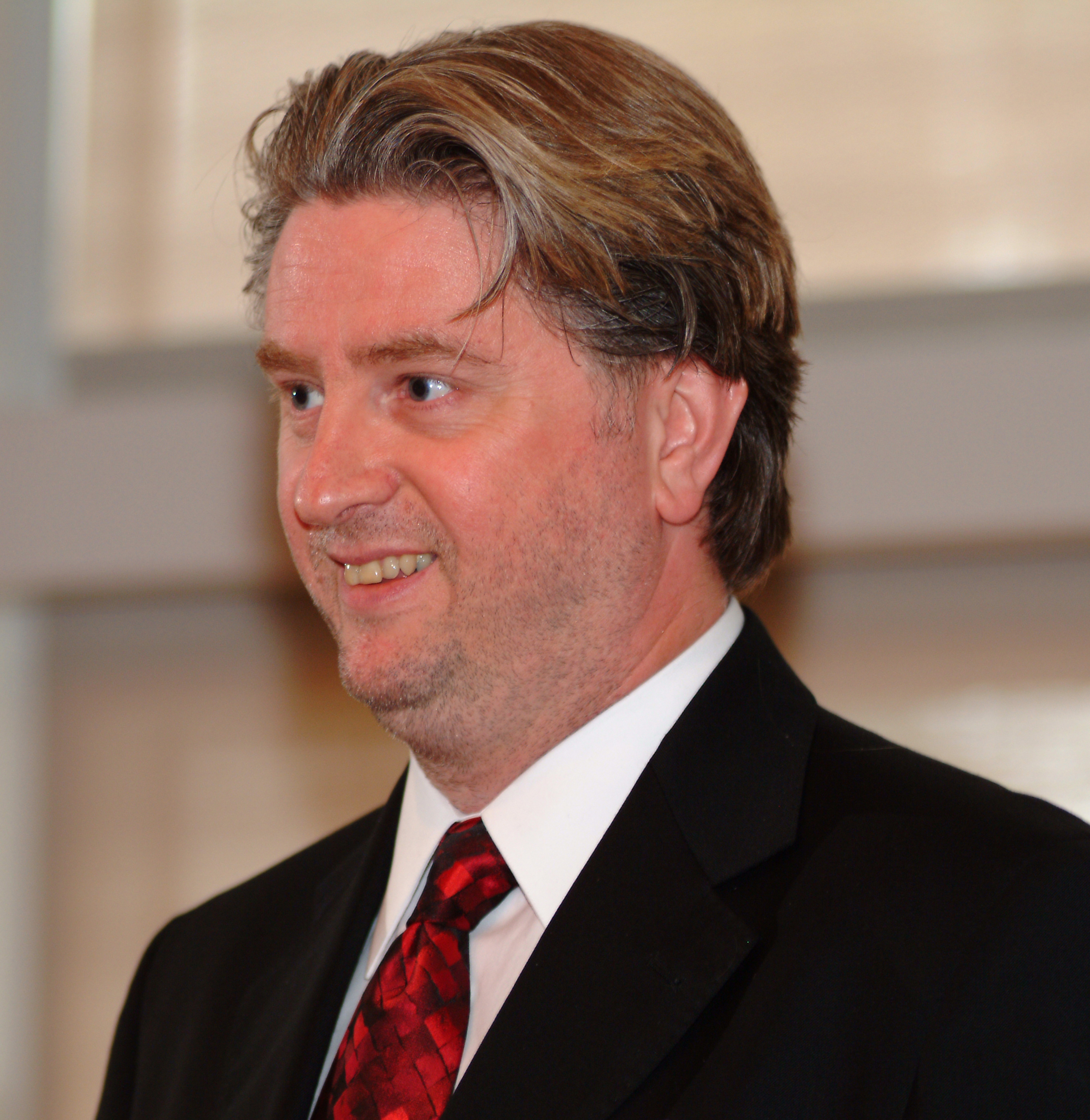
George Barclay, 2004

== See also ==
- List of chemistry awards
