= Utkal University =

Public university in Bhubaneswar, Odisha, India

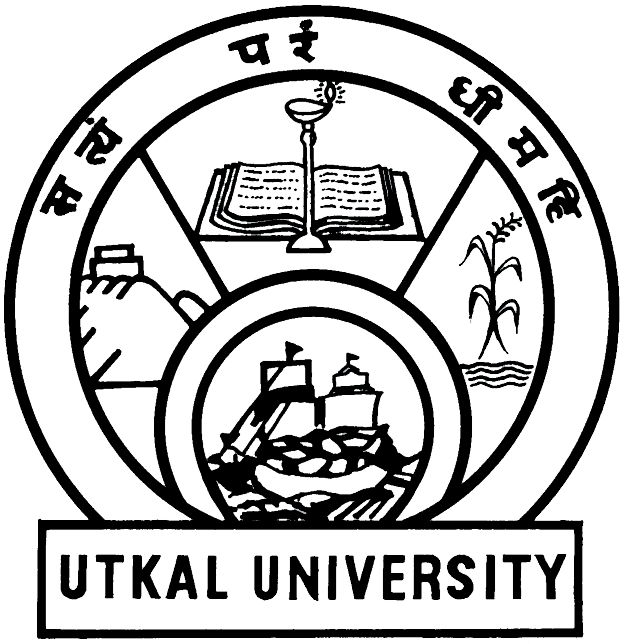
- Motto: Satyam param dhīmahi
- Motto in English: Seek The Highest Truth
- Type: Public
- Established: 27 November 1943; 82 years ago
- Accreditation: NAAC
- Academic affiliations: UGC; AIU; AICTE; PCI
- Chancellor: Governor of Odisha
- Vice-Chancellor: Chandi Prasad Nanda
- Faculty: 187
- Students: 4,334
- Undergraduates: 249
- Postgraduates: 3,840
- Doctoral students: 245
- Location: Vani Vihar, Bhubaneshwar, Odisha, 751004, India; 20°18′14″N 85°50′23″E
- Campus: Urban 399.9 acres (161.8 ha)
- Language: English, Odia
- Website: utkaluniversity.ac.in

University rankings

General – India
- NIRF (Universities) (2024): 101-150

Utkal University (UU) is a public university in Bhubaneswar, Odisha, and is the oldest university in the state and the 17th-oldest university in India. The university was established in 1943 and was operating from Ravenshaw College in the early days.

The foundation stone of the current Utkal University campus at Vani Vihar, Bhubaneswar, was laid by Dr. Rajendra Prasad, the first President of India, on 1 January 1958. The campus was inaugurated by Dr. S. Radhakrishnan, the second President of India, on 2 January 1963.

It is a teaching-cum-affiliating university. The sprawling 399.9 acre campus at Vani Vihar is located in the heart of Bhubaneswar.

In 2016, Utkal University adopted its theme song from "tunga sikhar chula" (1st 3 stanzas) poem of Godabarish Mishra, one of its founder members.

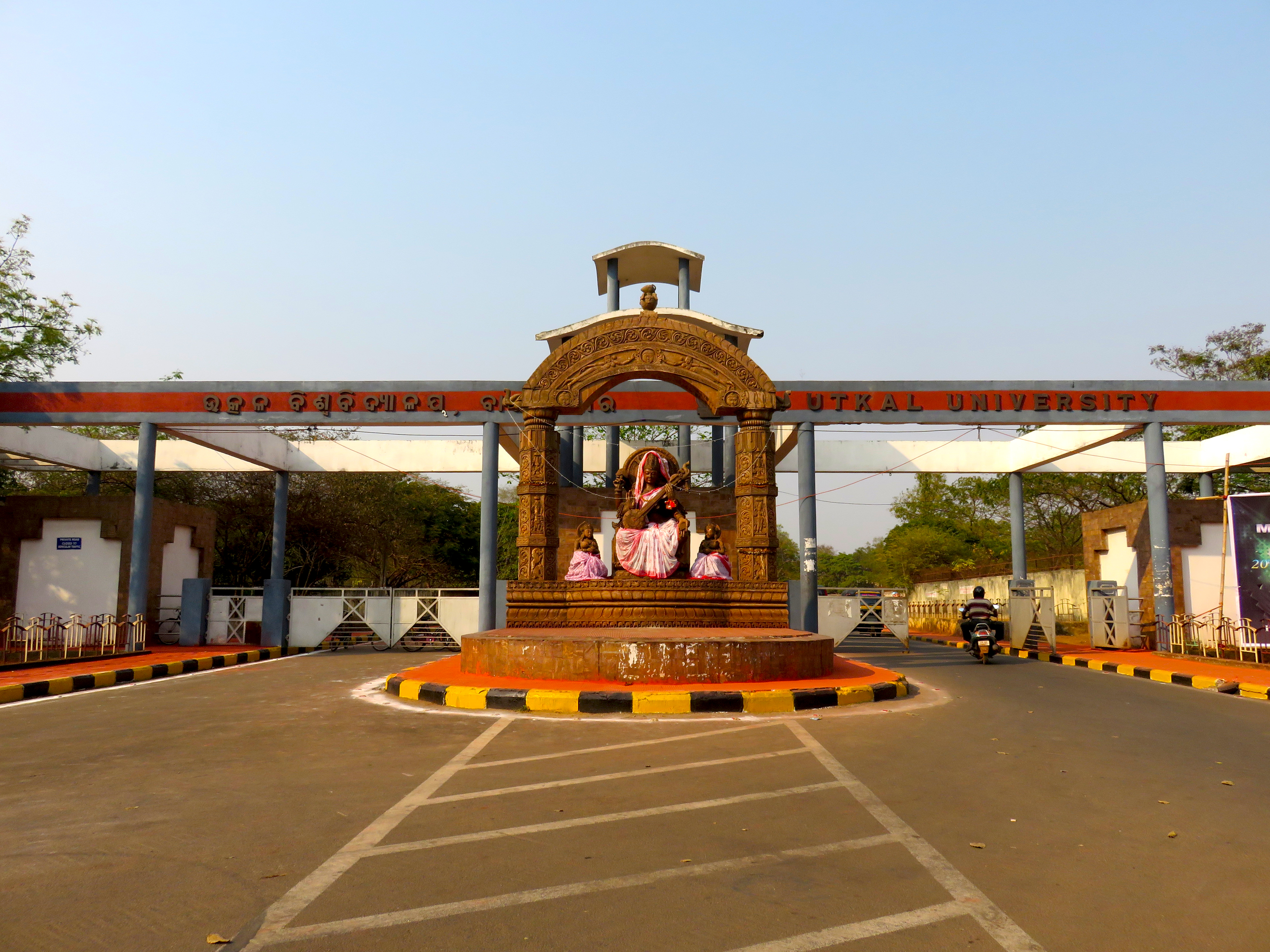
Utkal University Main Gate

== Location ==
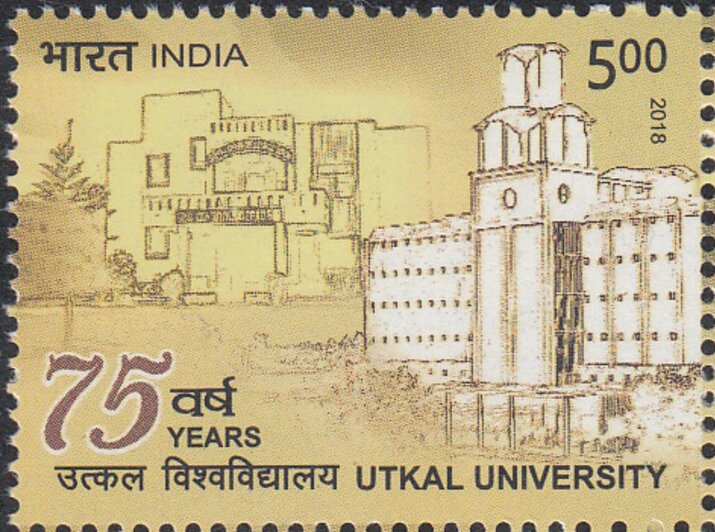
Stamp of India 2018 75th Anniversary of Utkal University

Baidyanath Misra, the head of the department of Analytical & Applied Economics, instituted two academic chairs, funded by the Reserve Bank of India and the State Bank of India at the university. University Department of Pharmaceutical Sciences (Department of Pharmacy)

=== Rankings ===
Utkal University was ranked in the 101–150 band among universities by National Institutional Ranking Framework (NIRF) in 2024.

=== Accreditation ===
Utkal University was accredited A+ grade with CGPA of 3.26 on a 4-point scale National Assessment and Accreditation Council (NAAC) in the third assessment cycle.

== Notable alumni ==
- Shakuntala Baliarsingh (born 1948), Odia language writer and translator
- Rupa Dash, media entrepreneur and filmmaker
- Manjusri Misra, chemical engineer and research professor
- Sangita Mukhopadhyay, Molecular cell biologist, N-Bios laureate
- Droupadi Murmu, 15th President of India, and the first person belonging to a tribal community and also the second woman to hold the office.
- G. C. Murmu, former Comptroller and Auditor General of India and former Lieutenant Governor of Jammu and Kashmir
- Ramesh C. Ray, agriculture and food microbiologist.
- Dharmendra Pradhan, Former Union Minister of Education
