= Society of Chemical Industry (America Section) =

Learned society in the United States

Society of Chemical Industry America
- Formation: 1894
- Type: Nonprofit organization
- Headquarters: Philadelphia, PA
- Location: United States
- Official language: English
- Chair: Dean Cordle
- Website: https://sci-america.org/

The Society of Chemical Industry (America Section) or SCI America is an independent learned society inspired by the creation of the Society of Chemical Industry (SCI) in London in 1881. Originally known as the New York Section, it was formed in 1894 and officially renamed the America Section in 1919. SCI America awards several prizes in fields that support the chemical industry: the Perkin Medal, the Chemical Industry Medal and the Gordon E. Moore Medal. SCI America also awards scholarships to college students majoring in the chemical sciences through Scholarship America, as well as supports Black scholars in chemistry and chemical engineering through the American Institute of Chemical Engineers' FOSSI program.

== History ==
The creation of the Society of Chemical Industry in London in 1881 led to the eventual formation of a number of satellite groups. A number of informal meetings were held in 1894, with the goal of organizing a New York section of the Society of Chemical Industry. On May 2, 1894, analytical chemist Arthur McGeorge met with seven other members of London's Society of Chemical Industry who were active in New York. At a second meeting, with Alfred H. Mason as chairman and McGeorge as secretary, it was decided to invite all New York-based members of the London society to an organizational meeting. At this third meeting, at the College of Pharmacy, 36 members of the Society of Chemical Industry signed a petition requesting the London organization to form a New York section, the first section to be created overseas. Their proposal was enthusiastically received by London president E. C. C. Stanford, who wrote "We are pleased to add the stars and stripes to our highly respectable old colours."

The first official meeting of the new New York Section was held in November 1894. The new section had a membership of 350 members, about one-tenth of the entire organization. The London group's president Thomas Tyrer and foreign secretary Ludwig Mond attended the October 1895 fall meeting in New York, which was rescheduled so that they could participate.

In contrast to the American Chemical Society, which required its members to hold university degrees, the Society of Chemical Industry was open to a broad range of working chemists in industry, manufacturing and pharmaceuticals. Mason emphasized that the new organization did not intend to compete with the ACS, but rather to bring together academic and manufacturing chemists:

We believe there is room for our Society in America... the industrial applications of chemistry have become so numerous that the existence of a separate body to especially consider this branch is desirable." – Arthur Mason

Members of the America section benefited from the activities of the parent society, which held scientific conferences and published The Journal of the Society of Chemical Industry to inform chemists throughout the world about development in the field. From the beginning, the America Section's focus was networking, engaging its members in collegial activities. The second chairman, Charles F. Chandler, said "It serves to bring us together, to make us acquainted, and it enables us to help each other." Members of the New York section helped to establish The Chemists' Club in New York City in 1898, using it for lectures and meetings, and establishing a members' library. In the beginning, talks were presented at the monthly meetings and published in the parent journal. Guest speakers included important international figures like Leo Baekeland, Carl Duisberg, and Jōkichi Takamine. In 1904, the New York Section hosted the first annual meeting of its parent organization to be held in the United States.

The New York section was briefly involved in practical work on standardization in 1902–03, when they established a Subcommittee on Uniformity of Analysis of Materials. Two samples of Portland cement were analyzed by 14 chemists, and 3 samples of zinc ore were analyzed by 42 chemists. The results were critiqued by William Francis Hillebrand, who became chief chemist at the National Bureau of Standards. The committee dissolved and was replaced in 1904 by a new committee formed by the ACS. The American section also engaged in early lobbying efforts, as in 1907, when they passed a resolution protesting that Rules and Regulations published by the Department of Agriculture displayed a "lack of expert knowledge." However, such activities never became a major focus of the organization.

In 1919, the New York group was renamed the America Section. While maintaining close relationships with the Society of Chemical Industry in England, SCI America operates independently.

== Governance ==
The Society of Chemical Industry (America Section) is a registered nonprofit organization, with administrative offices in Philadelphia, PA. SCI America is directed by a set of officers including a chair and vice-chair, and an executive committee. Dean Cordle, President and CEO of AC & S, Incorporated, serves as chair. Previous chairpersons include Anthony O'Donovan, Roger Kearns, Frank Bozich, John Paro, Max Tishler, Ralph Landau, Harold Sorgenti, Charles O. Holliday, and Christopher D. Pappas. Resa Thomason serves as the Executive Director.

== Activities ==
=== Awards ===
The major activities of SCI America are two yearly events for the presentation of awards. SCI America presents the Perkin Medal (established 1906), the Chemical Industry Medal, first awarded 1933), and the Gordon E. Moore Medal (first awarded 2004).

The first Perkin Medal was awarded to chemist William Henry Perkin to mark the 50th anniversary of his discovery of the aniline dye mauveine. This anniversary was celebrated internationally as the Perkin Jubilee. SCI America commemorated a visit by Perkin and his family to the United States in the fall of 1906 by inviting 400 guests to a dinner in his honor at Delmonico's and presenting him with the first Perkin Medal. The Perkin Medal is considered the highest honor in applied chemistry to be given to a chemist residing in the United States. It is administered jointly by a committee whose representatives include the chairs or presidents of the ACS, the American Institute of Chemical Engineers, the Science History Institute, and SCI America.

From 1920 to 1932, SCI America awarded the Grasselli Medal, on behalf of the Grasselli Chemical Company, for a paper presenting the most useful suggestions in applied chemistry before the Society. This award was replaced in 1933 by the Chemical Industry Medal, which was given to a person who had made a valuable contribution by applying chemical research in industry.

Since 2004 SCI America has awarded a medal in honor of Gordon E. Moore, for early-career innovation involving the application of chemistry.

=== Scholars ===
Working with Scholarship America, SCI America provides financial scholarships to students from colleges and universities in the United States majoring in chemistry, chemical engineering, and related fields. Up to five $5,000 scholarships are awarded annually. SCI America also works with the AIChE FOSSI program to support scholars in chemistry and chemical engineering.
