= Society of Plastics Engineers =

International professional membership organization

- Abbreviation: SPE
- Established: 1942
- Headquarters: Danbury, CT
- Location: Danbury, Connecticut, United States
- Members: 22,500+
- CEO: Patrick Farrey
- Chief Executive, SPE Foundation: Eve Vitale
- COO: Sue Wojnicki
- Manager, Sales & Advertising: Desiray Young
- Board of directors: https://www.4spe.org/i4a/pages/index.cfm?pageid=3330
- Staff: 33
- Website: www.4spe.org

The Society of Plastics Engineers (SPE) is a global professional membership organization dedicated to the advancement of knowledge and education for professionals employed in the plastics industry.

== History ==
SPE's motto is "Inspiring Plastics Professionals." Founded in 1942, today the organization has more than 22,500 members who are plastics professionals throughout the United States and in more than 84 countries around the world.

In October 2025 SPE announced a merger with PLASTICS Industry Association. The combined organization will serve the entire global plastics value chain - from technical professionals to corporate leaders, and from molecule to marketplace.

== About ==
Membership in SPE helps plastics professionals advance their technical knowledge through conferences, seminars, and webinars; publications including Plastics Engineering magazine, SPE News, Plastics Insight Newsletter; and resources including the Materials Database, networking opportunities, and more. Membership levels include: Professional Membership, Young Professional Membership, Student Membership, Emeritus Membership, and Subscriber.

SPE is divided into local chapters (based on geographical location) and technical chapters (based on particular specialties or interests). The organization is managed by an association management staff with the support of volunteer leadership, including an Executive Board.

Local chapters exist around the world in over 70 countries. Many chapters publish local newsletters as well as organize technical and networking meetings. Members of SPE are also members of one or more of the 32 specific technical chapters:

- Additive Manufacturing & 3D Printing
- Additives and Color Europe
- Applied Rheology,
- Automotive
- Bioplastics and Renewable Technologies
- Blow Molding
- Building and Infrastructure
- Color and Appearance
- Composites
- Decorating and Coatings
- Engineering Properties and Structure
- European Medical Polymers
- European Thermoforming
- Extrusion
- Failure Analysis & Prevention
- Flexible Packaging
- Injection Molding
- Joining of Plastics & Composites
- Medical Plastics
- Mold Technologies
- Non-Halogen Flame Retardant Materials
- Plastics Pipes & Fittings
- Polymer Analysis
- Polymer Modifiers and Additives
- Product Design and Development
- Rotational Molding
- Recycling
- Thermoforming
- Thermoplastic Elastomers
- Thermoplastic Materials and Foams
- Thermoset
- Vinyl Plastics

== SPE Foundation ==
The SPE Foundation supports the development of plastics professionals by funding quality educational programs, grants and scholarships emphasizing science, engineering, sustainability, and manufacturing while working to create inclusive opportunities for students around the world. In 2022 SPE launched its "Plastics and Beyond" podcast, which focuses on issues of diversity, equity and inclusion in the manufacturing industry.

Through demonstrations and hands-on activities, the Foundation's PlastiVan® Program is designed to get students interested about the opportunities in science and engineering within the plastics industry. Students are educated about the chemistry, history, processing, manufacturing, and sustainability of plastics and how the science and real-world applications relate to their everyday lives. PlastiVan® provides science and educational programs which spark scientific curiosity in students while increasing their knowledge of the contribution plastics make to modern life; encouraging them to seek careers in engineering. The program is aligned with NGSS standards.

The SPE Foundation offers numerous scholarships to students who have demonstrated or expressed an interest in the plastics industry. They must be majoring in or taking courses that would be beneficial to a career in the plastics industry, such as plastics engineering, polymer science, chemistry, physics, chemical engineering, mechanical engineering, industrial engineering, journalism or communications. All applicants must be in good standing with their colleges.

== ANTEC® ==
SPE's holds its Annual Technical Conference or ANTEC® each spring in various locations throughout North America. The meeting includes presentations of peer-reviewed technical papers about plastics innovations and technologies from around the world. ANTEC® also showcases the latest advances in industrial, national laboratory and academic work. Papers and presentations share findings in polymer research and new and improved products and technologies.

== Plastics Engineering ==
SPE's professional trade journal Plastics Engineering keeps plastics professionals and other specialists in the value chain up to date on the latest materials equipment and process technologies that impact all aspects of product development and applications in the plastics industry. Plastics Engineering also covers the trends and influences that affect plastics in key global markets.

== Notable members ==
- Glenn Beall
- Samuel L. Belcher
- F. Reed Estabrook
- Irvin I. Rubin
- Armand G. Winfield
