= Vikramkhol Cave Inscriptions =

Cave and archaeological site in India

Coordinates: 21.826724°N 83.764282°E

Vikramkhol Cave Inscription
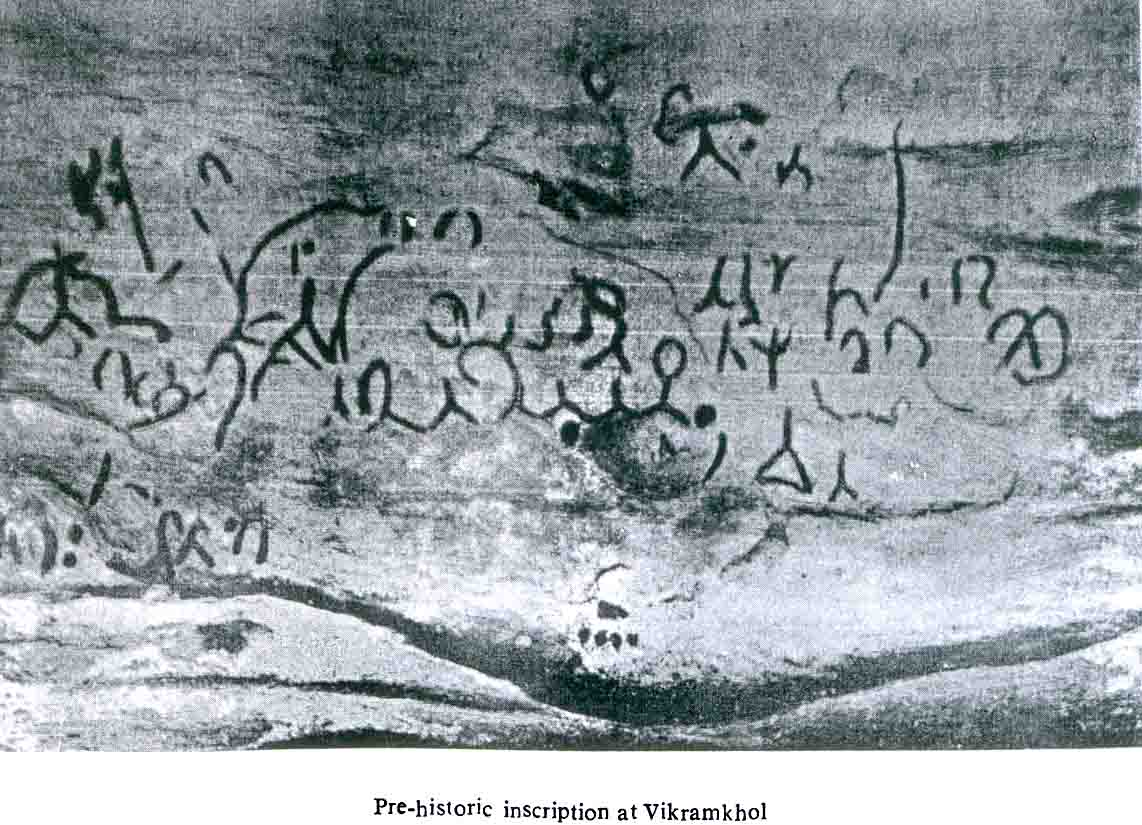
- Vikramkhol Inscription
- Writing: Pre Brahmi script
- Created: circa 1500 BCE
- Discovered: Vikramkhol, Jharsuguda
- Present location: Jharsuguda

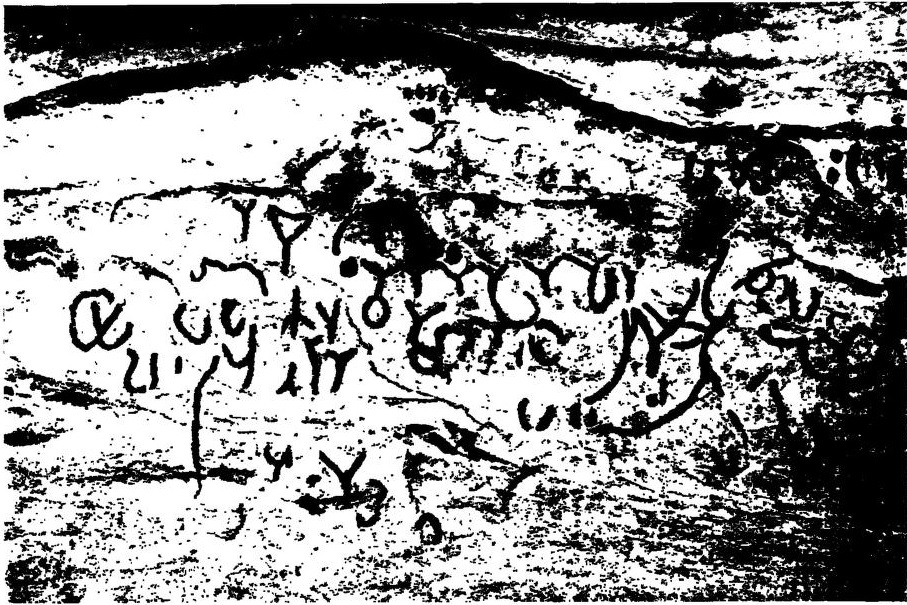
Vikramkhol inscription

Vikramkhol or Bikramkhol (Odia: [bikɾɔmɔkʰɔlɔ]) cave is a prehistoric archaeological site in India known for its prehistoric inscriptions.

== Location ==
Vikramkhol cave is located near Jharsuguda, Odisha, India and lies in Reserved Forest of Belpahar range, at a distance of 12 km from Belpahar.

== Inscriptions ==
The inscriptions at Vikramkhol cave are written on an uneven rock surface in a natural rock shelter using red Ochre paint which is later incised into the rock. The inscriptions were discovered around the 1930s and first studied by Dr K P Jayaswal. who tentatively dates it to 1500 BC. There are two theories regarding the inscription – one declares it a writing, while others doubt it as a rock art and nonliterate rock carvings.

=== Theory of literate script ===
According to Jayaswal, the prehistoric scribblings at Vikramkhol represent a picto-syllabic writing system which represents a mixture of Harappan and Brahmi hence forming a connection between the two. The inscribed portion covers an area of 35 feet by 7 feet, The evidences which support it as a writing system are as follows;

- The characters are carefully painted and then inscribed which has parallels with Brahmi rock inscriptions
- The writings are in regular lines (not always regular due to rough rock surface)
- The symbols have set forms which disclose ‘writing habits in the phraseology of handwriting experts. The hand which first painted the letters was used to writing with a pen as evidenced from a certain portion of the inscription.
- The system knows the bindu, and also, probably, the visarga. Some letters have dots placed below them, while in some cases dots seem to give a discriminative value to the letters, as in Semitic writing.
- The right-hand corner top line on Plate 8, where the same symbol is repeated more than once, may point to the employment of numerals.
- It is evident that some of the letters disclose accentuation. Repetition of the same letter twice probably suggests consonantal duplication or conjuncts.
- The writing seems to have reached the syllabary (alphabetic) stage.

Other scholars such as Naresh Prasad Rastogi state that its date of the Vikramkhol inscription is still debatable and its letters deserve a more searching scrutiny.

=== Literate system ===
Scholars such as Richard Salomon have completely dismissed the Vikramkhol cave inscriptions as pseudo inscriptions According to C.L Fabri, the topsy turvy incised signs may have some resemblance with Brahmi script but do not represent writing, though the possibility of a primitive rural writing form cannot be denied either.

Eminent researcher and calligrapher Dr. Subrat Kumar Prusty's study of the pre Brahmi script shows that

- The Vikramkhol Cave script has 42 letters written on three lines.
- It clearly identifies a total of 24 letters, which are in similarity with the Indus and Brahmi scripts.
- Some of the letters have been written more than once.
- The gesture is seen to have been applied at the site of need.
- It is known that by this time the serial writing method of the script had already been evolved as no images of any animals were found in the place of writing.
- Since some of the letters have been conjoined, it is believed that the technique of writing in conjunction has been created.
- It is known that the quantitative mark was applied as there were some symbolic markings at the bottom and top of the script.
- It is clear that the writing started not from the right, but from the left.
- It can be read soon as its script has been identified.

In this context, yogimatha script, Indus Vally Scripts, Vikramkhol script and Brahmi script can be taken as a gradual development of the Indian script.

=== Neglect ===
Some historians have felt that, due to negligence and apathy by Government agencies, the inscriptions are fading out and damaged by vandals. Activities of coal mines in surrounding hills, industries like sponge iron are putting environmental pressure on this prehistoric archaeological site. The rock shelter, where the inscriptions are found, is not fully protected and kept open to atmosphere, giving scope for vandals and visitors to deface the inscriptions. As it is located inside Reserve Forest of Belpahar range, the remote access to the place has also contributed to the neglect by Government Agencies.

=== Other Inscriptions ===
Another set of proto Brahmi or pre historic inscriptions have been found at Garjan Dongar in Sundergarh district, and Ushakothi in Sambalpur district in Orissa.
