= Subrat Kumar Prusty =

Indian Odia-language scholar and author (born 1976)

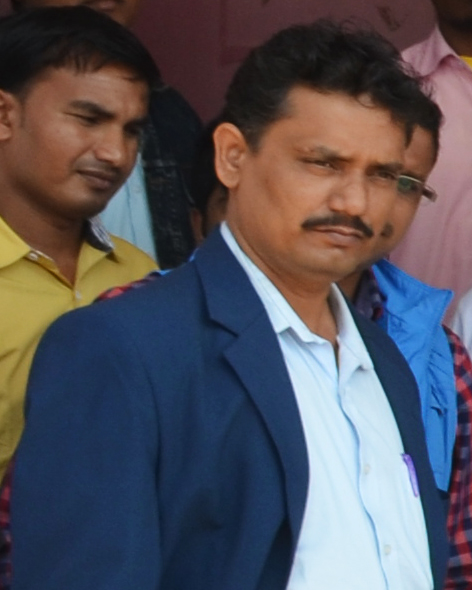
- Subrat Kumar Prusty during Odia Wikipedia's 10th anniversary, Bhubaneswar

Institute of Odia Studies and Research

Personal details
- Born: 8 June 1976 (age 50) Bidyadharpur, Jajpur, Odisha
- Education: MA, LLB, PhD
- Alma mater: Utkal University, Bhubaneswar
- Occupation: Researcher, linguist, literary critique, and author
- Awards: PRESIDENTIAL AWARD OF Maharshi Badrayan Vyas Samman −2019 For Classical Odia
- Website: http://iosrodisha.in/
- Writing career
- Notable works: Odia Bhasara Utpatti O kramabikasha (2018); Sastriya Bhasa Odia (2017); Classical Odia in Historical Perspective (2015); Classical Odia(2013); Bhasa o jatiyata (2010); Jati, jagruti o pragati (2009); Odia Bhasa Sahitya Parichaya (2007); Prasanga: Odia Bhasa o Sahitya (2005)

Subrat Kumar Prusty (born 1976) is an Indian Odia-language scholar, activist, social entrepreneur, literary critic and author. He is Member Secretary of the Institute of Odia Studies and Research, Bhubaneswar, Odisha. He was instrumental in preparing the research documents, advocating the awarding of Classical Language status to Odia, forming Central Institute of Classical Odia, Odia University and implementation of the Odisha Official Language Act, 1954. He was awarded the Presidential Certificate of Honour and Maharshi Badrayan Vyas Samman – 2019 for Classical Odia.

== Early life and education ==
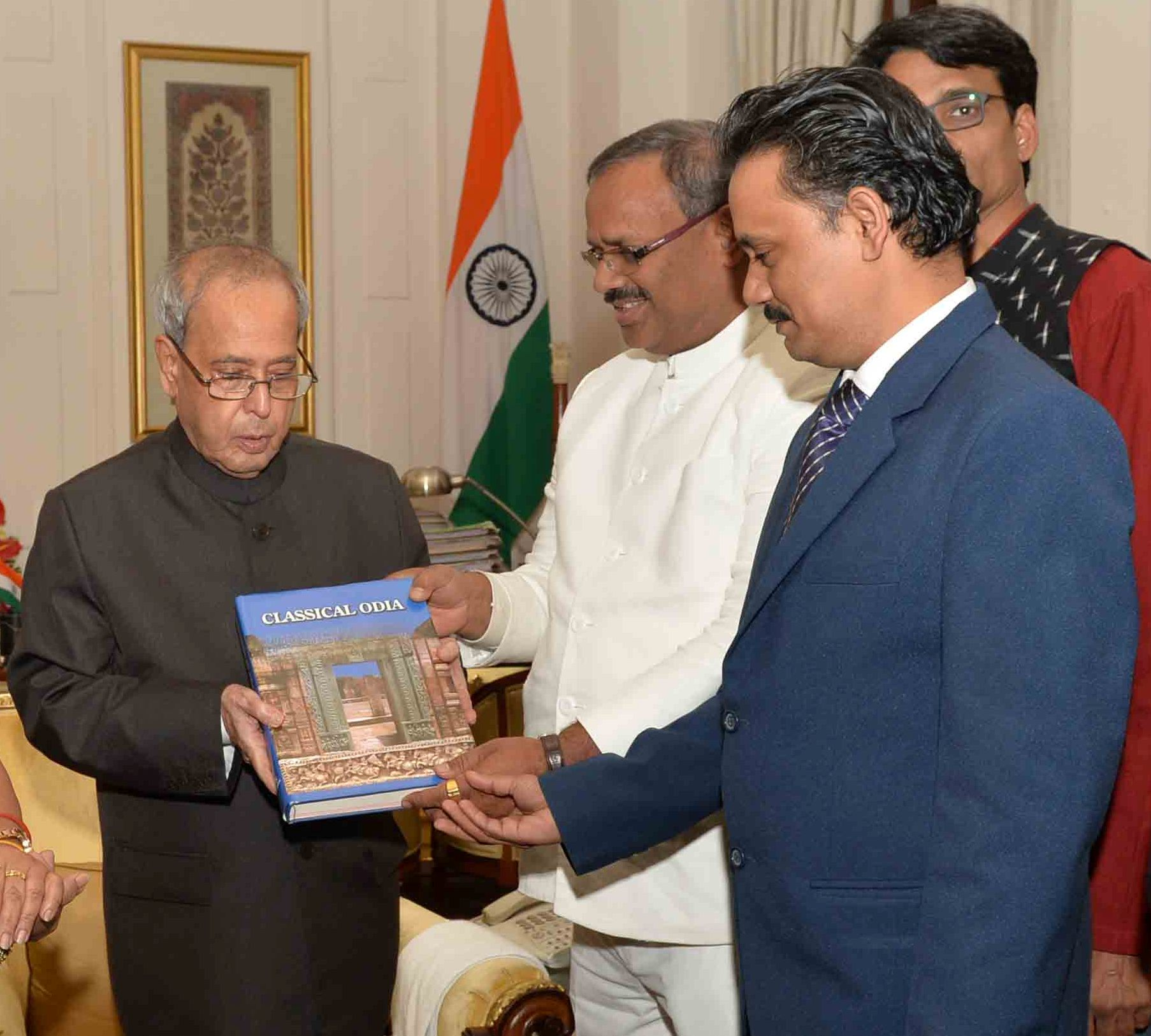
The President of India inaugurating the book Classical Odia

Dr. Subrat Kumar Prusty was born the third son of Late Rajkishore Prusty and Indumati Prusty in the village of Bidyadharpur, near Jajpur Town, the oldest capital of Odisha situated on the banks of Budha, a tributary of the Holy Baitarani. After his schooling at Sudarshan Padhi High School, he chose to join N.C. College Jajpur (then affiliated with Utkal University), where he did his B.A. honours, this was followed by a master's degree in Odia language and literature with a specialization in linguistics from Ravenshaw University, Cuttack. During that time, he was the publisher and editor of a monthly magazine, Maheswati, which is published in Jajpur. It was here that he started writing Odia stories and poetry. As a story writer, he owns the first literary award in School period. He did his LLB from Madhusudan Law College, Cuttack.

== Social activities ==
Prusty followed in his father's footsteps practicing Social Service. During his high school years, he established a library and book bank for rural pupils who were lacking the facilities to purchase books for their studies. To extend the service to a larger number of youth, he established Sangathan Viswabharatiyam and Ganatantrika Grama Samaj. The organization fought for the untouchables and for their social rights. As a volunteer leader of Sangathan Viswa Bharatiyam, he organised relief camps and rehabilitation in the super cyclone-hit areas of coastal Odisha from 31 October 1999 to 10 December 1999. He also participated as a front-line volunteer in the Orissa Disaster Mitigation Mission in Bhubaneswar and organised a relief camp in earthquake-hit areas of Gujarat on 31 January 2001 to 10 February 2001.

== Research activities ==
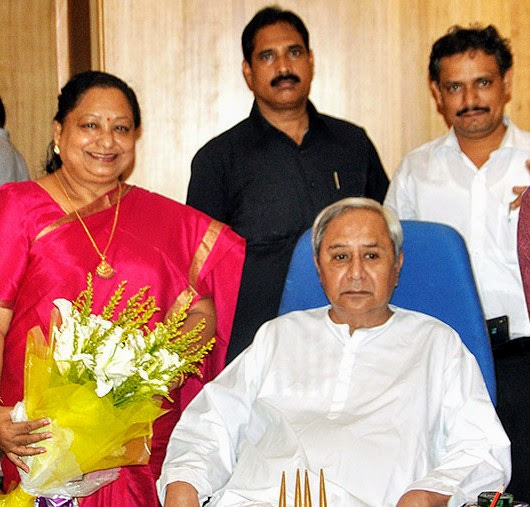
With Hon'ble CM of Odisha Sj. Naveen Patnaik upon discussion about establishment of Odia University.

Dr. Prusty qualified for the national eligibility test (UGC-NET/JRF) in Odia three times and joined Utkal University as a research scholar. He submitted his PhD thesis entitled Social Relevance of Odia Novel and was awarded a PhD degree in 2014 from Utkal University. Through his research work, the Odia language has received classical status. He studied Ancient Indian rock paintings and inscriptions in an attempt to prove that the Indian script is not related to the Sumerian, Hurrian, or Elamite scripts but that the Indian scripts are most closely related to the cave arts which existed in primitive to modern Indian architecture, thus attempting to establish the cave arts as the forerunners of Indian scripts.

=== Honors ===
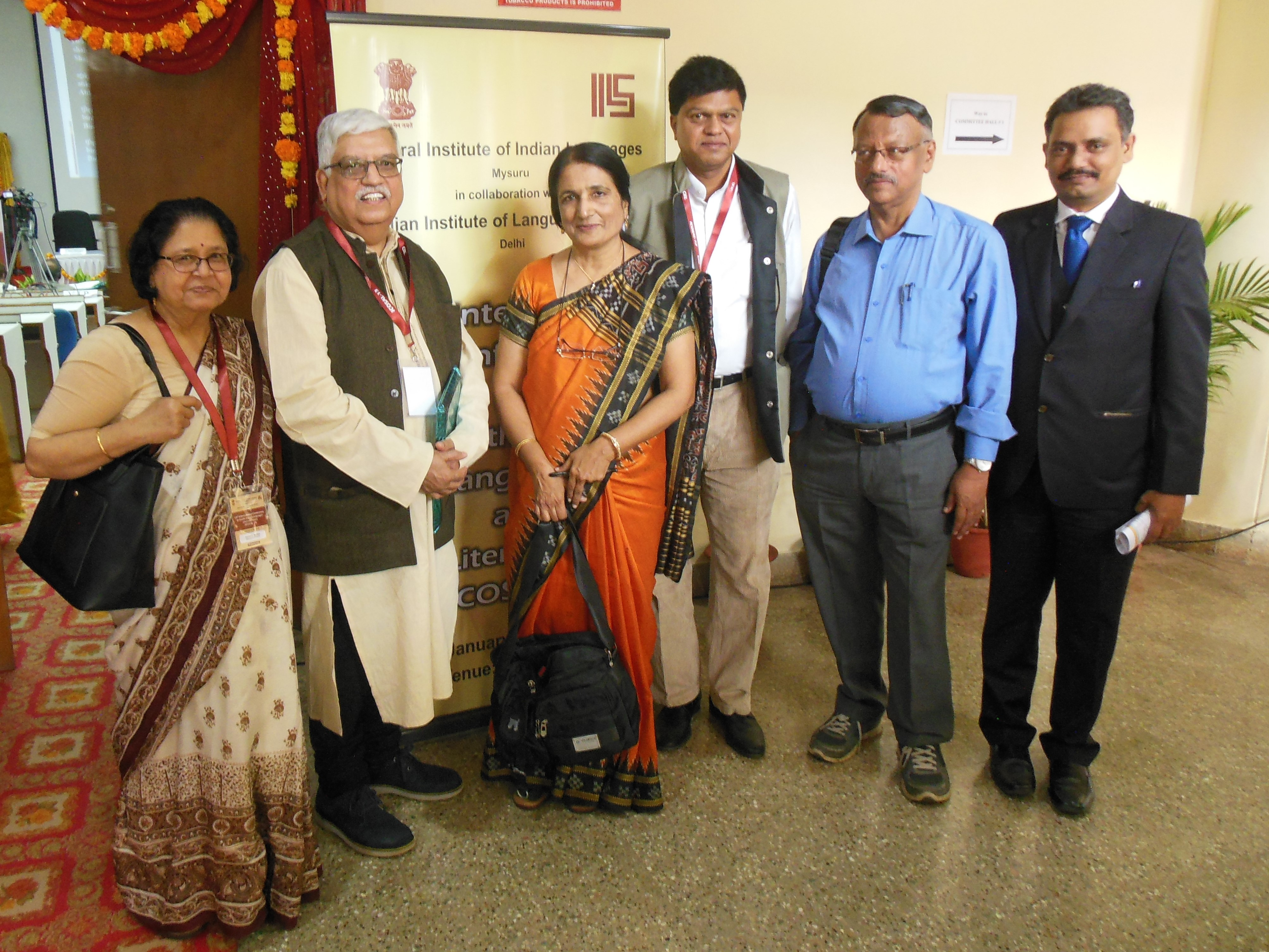
As a participant of the International Conference of South Asian Languages and Literatures (ICOSAL-13) at CIIL, Mysuru

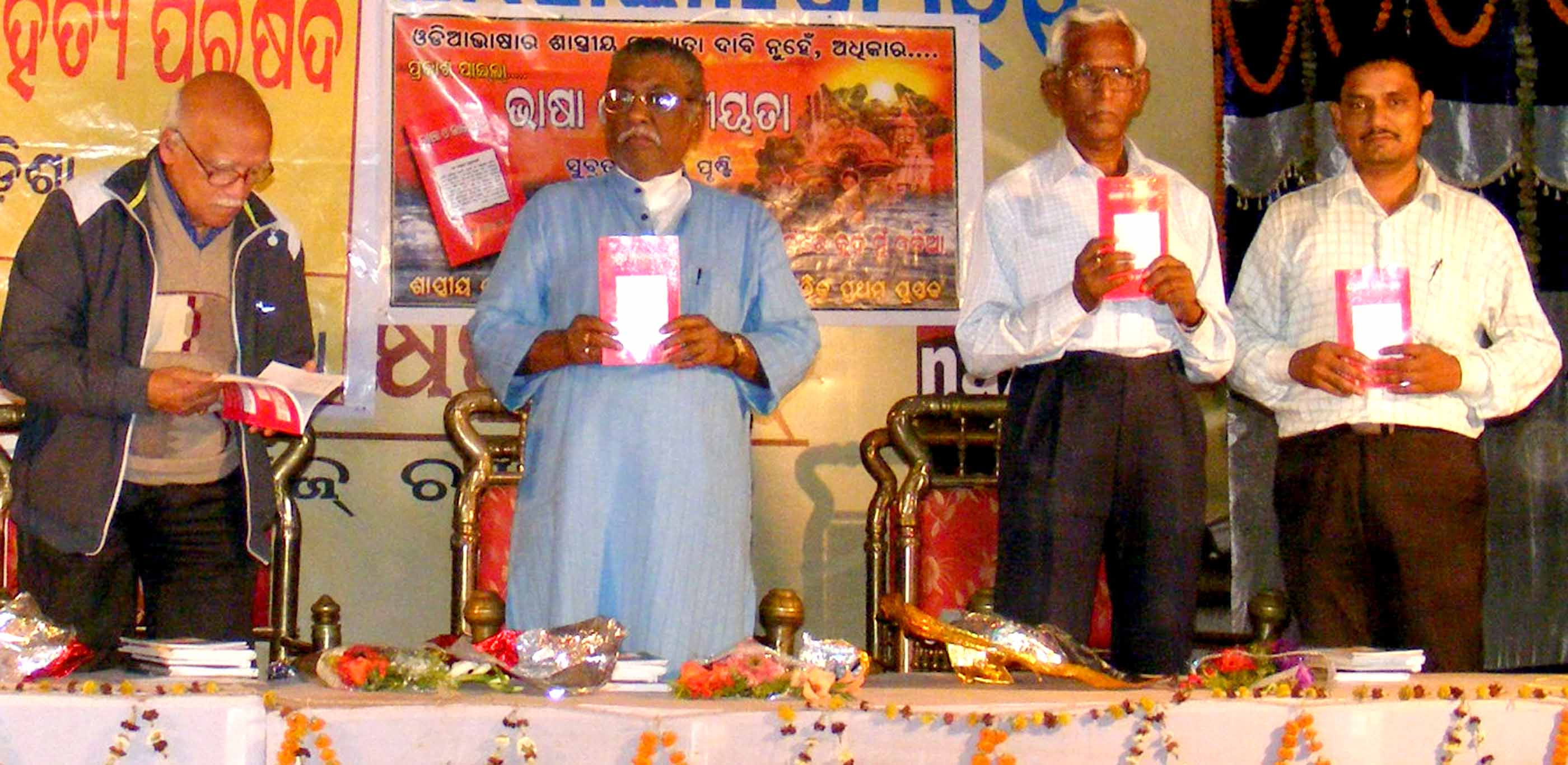
2nd Edition of Bhasa O Jatiyata Book inaugurated by Dr DP Pattanayak, Sj BK Dhal, Prof. Basudev Sahu at Bhubaneswar Book-fair

- Panchasakha Bhasa Sammana – 2025, Odia University, Satyabadi.
- Presidential Award of Maharshi Badrayan Vyas Samman – 2019 for Classical Odia
- Sastriya Manyata Sammana – 2017
- Bhasa Sammana – 2016, Progressive layer Association, Cuttack
- Bhasa Sammana – 2016, Sabdasparsa, Bhubaneswar
- Kalinga Sahasikaa Samman – 2016, Bhubaneswar
- Panchanan jena Smruti Sammana – 2016, Bhubaneswar
- Amari Bhasa Pathe Sammana – 2016, Amari Bhasa Pathe, New Delhi
- Ama Bhasa Gourav Samman – 2015, Swetasanketa Saraswata Anusthan, Bhubaneswar
- Ama Gourav Samman – 2015, The Intellects, New Delhi
- PhD – 2014 (Utkal University)
- Odiabhasa Sastriya Manyata Sammana – 2014, Jajpur
- Swadhinata Swanakhyatra Sammana – 2013, Sambhabana, Bhubaneswar
- Jajpur Samman – 2013, Jajpur Jilla Lekhaka Sammelana, Jajpur
- Odia Mahotsaba Samman – 2012, Sambhabana, Bhubaneswar

=== Role of classical status for the Odia language ===
Prusty's research activities involve document preparation for the classical status of Odia language. While the common scholarly and intellectual consensus in Odisha was that Odia script, language and literature were not more than 1000 years old, Prusty proved with sufficient evidence that not only are the Odia language and script more than 5000 years old, but Odia literature is also as old as Sanskrit literature.

First time he read the rock painting of the yogimatha of Nuapada District of Odisha, he deduced that it was an older Indian script. The script Ga, and o (tha) was discovered in the Yogimatha rock painting. The painting depicted a person with four animals and an alphabet. According to Prusty, the painting had a word like Gaitha (a common Odia word at present, Gotha or 'group' in English). The art closely was related to this alphabet. The alphabet has a similarity to the script of the inscriptions in Dhauli and Jaugada of Ashoka. He assumed it was an ancient form of Indian script and it is the first glimpse of the possible origin of the Odia language and script.

Prusty proved that Kharavel's Hatigumpha inscription (40 B.C.) was the real evidence of past Odia cultural, political, ritual and social status and it is the first poetic stake inscription. Though Ashoka created many rock edicts and inscriptions before Kharavela, his instructions for administration were written in a rude and chocked language. On the other hand, the Hatigumpha inscriptions show the flexibility of a language in a sweet flow.

Prusty argued some important points about classical status for the Odia Language. He also proved that Sanskrit as the source of the modern Indo-Aryan languages, Classical Odia is the source language of East India and South-East Asia's language. As Sanskrit is the most conservative and least changed of the Indo-Aryan languages, Odia is the conservative and advance updated languages as well that linguists must understand its nature and development. Unlike the other modern languages of India, Odia meets each of these requirements. It is extremely old (According to L.S.S O' Malley, as old as Latin and Vedic Sanskrit); it arose as an entirely independent tradition, with almost no influence from Sanskrit or other languages; and its ancient literature is indescribably vast and rich. After more than five years of deep research work without any help and guidance, Prusty published documentations which led to a political and intellectual movement for awarding Odia the status of a Classical Language.

=== National Language Conference ===
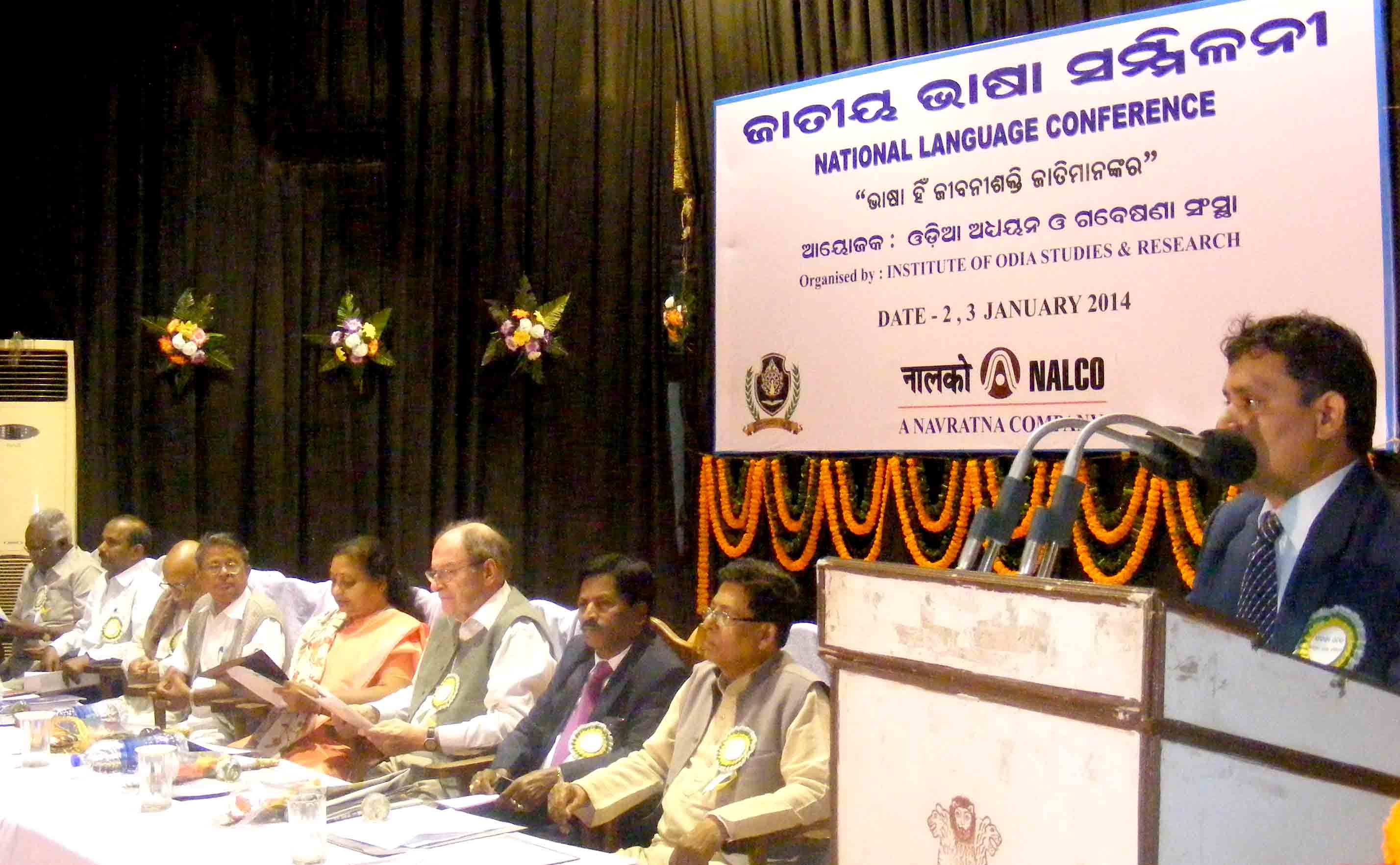

The Annual National Language Conference on Indian languages is the brainchild of Subrat Prusty. After the recognition of Odia as a classical language, The Conference was organized by the Institute of Odia Studies and Research for two days on 2 and 3 January 2014. The goal was to help create a platform to discuss language issues and support the language movement in preserving the regional heritage and culture. The conference was inaugurated by the Minister of Education Badrinarayana Patra and was attended by more than two hundred scholars of languages, linguistics, and humanities as well as sociologists. Dr. Hermann Kulke, Professor at Kiel University, Germany, Prof. H.C. Boralingaiah, Vice-Chancellor of Kananda University, Prof. K. Rathnaiah, Vice-Chancellor of Dravidian University, Dr. K. Ramasamy, Founder Director CICT were participated as guests. the seventh National Language Conference (2021) was held on 31 March – 1 April 2021 at Sri Jagannath Sanskrit University, Puri, Odisha.

== Organisational activities ==
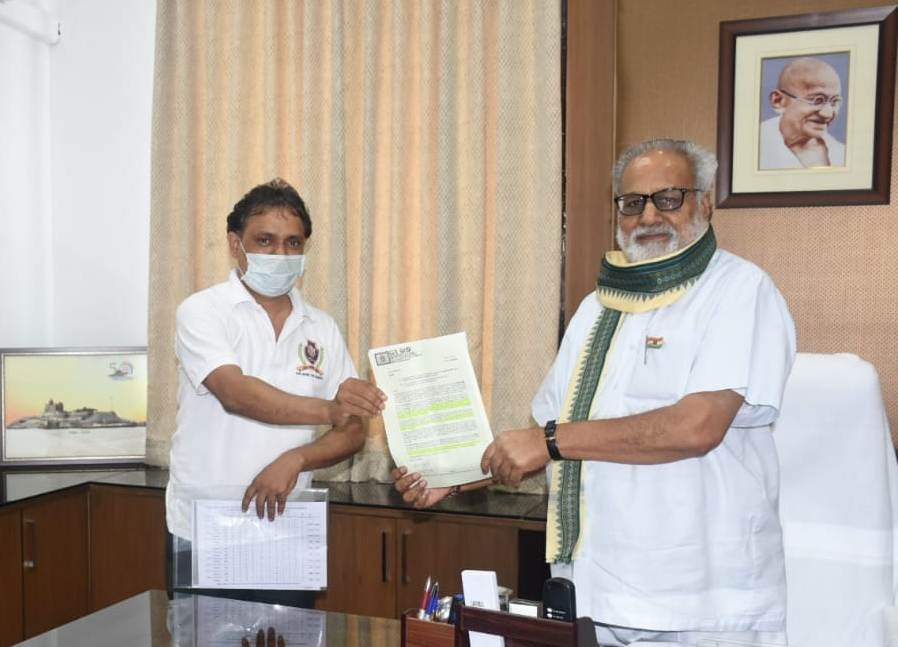
As part of "My Language My Right" movement, submitted a letter of demand to the Hon'ble Governor of Odisha for the preparation of all the Entrance Examination and Competitive Examination Questionnaires and the preparation of books in Odia.

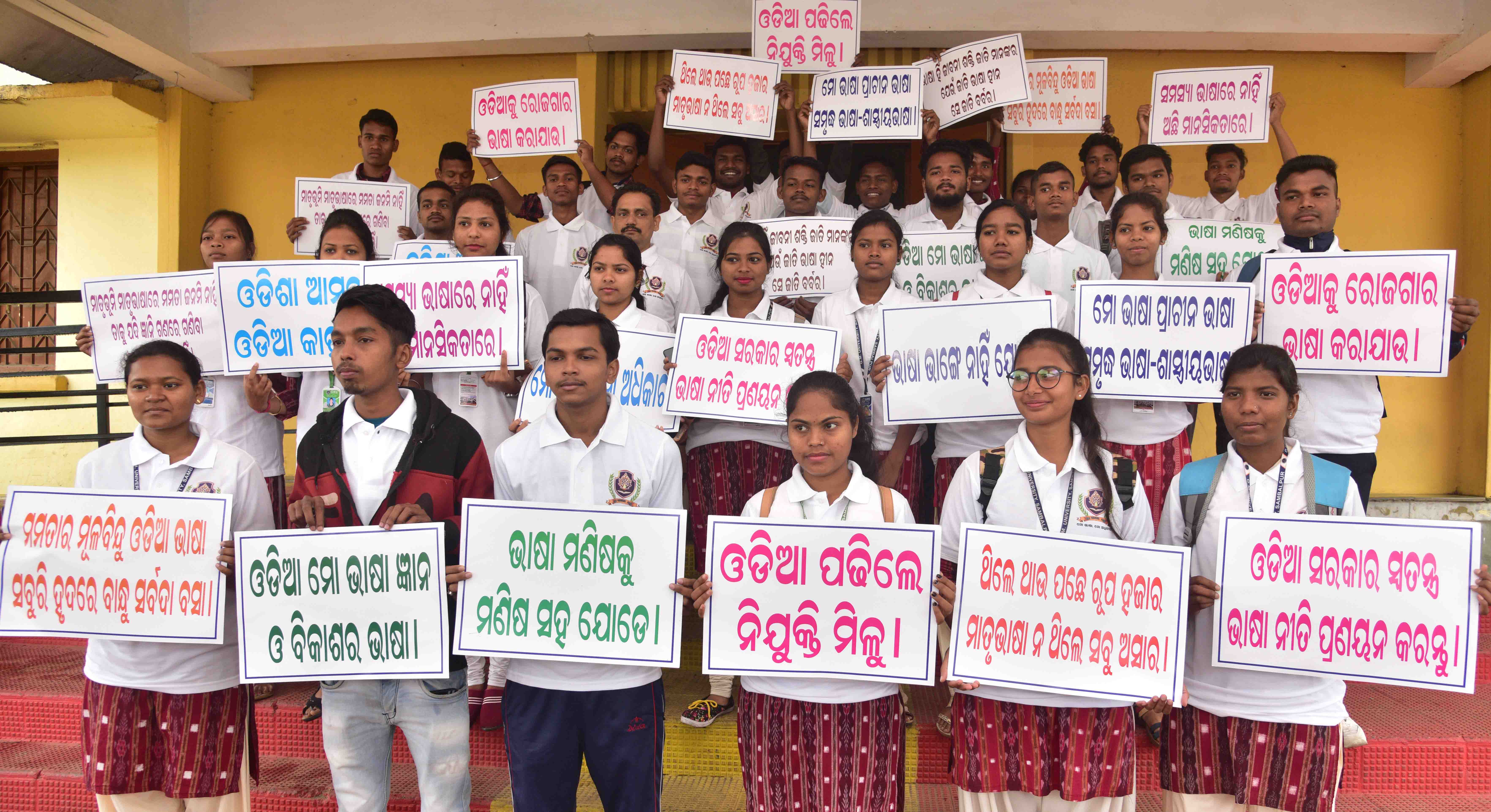
"My Language My Right" Movement with college students at Chandrasekhara Behera Jilla School, Sambalpur

Early in his life as a student, Pruty created or was involved with various social service organisations. But soon after his research work, he again entered active organizational work and formed Janasammilani, Odisha. His views on the eradication of poverty rests on setting up industry and that reformation in agriculture should be encouraged with related cottage industry, as Odisha is essentially an agricultural state. He has worked to impart Education in Odia. For this purpose he began to train promising students to appear in various competitive examinations in Odia.

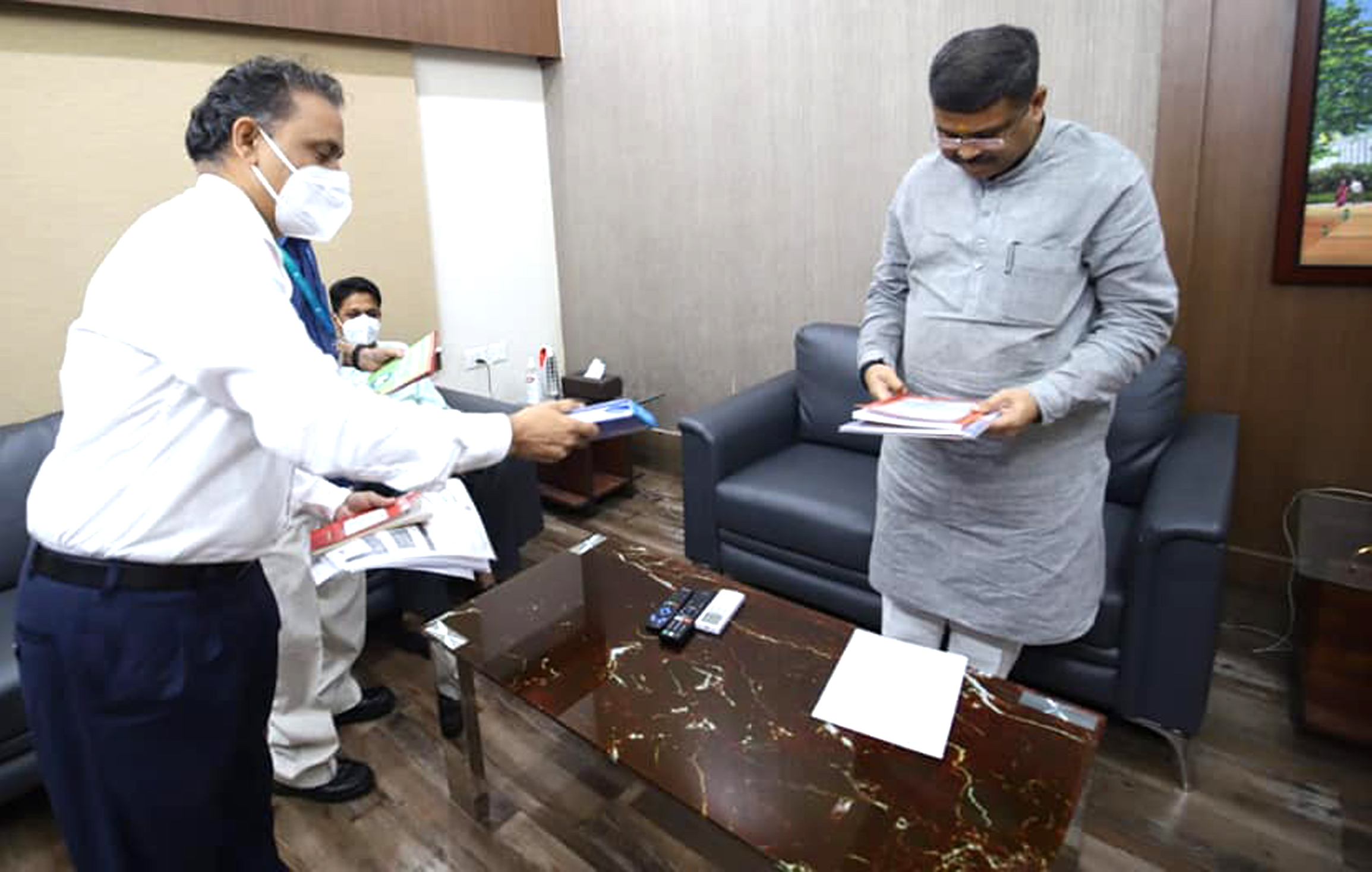
Presented a memorindum to Central Minister of Education Hon'ble Sj. Dharmendra Pradhan for imparting Engineering education in Odia

=== Language movement ===
In 2015, he formed the Odia Bhasa Sangram Samiti with intellectuals, academicians and politicians of Odisha to implement the Government Language Act-1954 of Odisha. Through this, the Odisha government was formed a ministerial committee. He was also a member of this committee. As per the committee's decision, the Odisha government has been carrying out various development works for the Odia language since 2015. To spread and preserve history and culture of Odisha and enrich the Odia language, a proposal of this ministerial committee to this effect was approved first Heritage Cabinet meeting presided over by the CM at Puri on 26 Dec 2017 and also conducted entirely in Odia. The heritage cabinet approved 20th numbers of proposal like the culture department renamed as 'Odia Language, Literature and Culture' department, the cabinet to make provisions of punishment for not using Odia in official work, set up Odia Language Commission, world conference on Odia language will be organised every five years, fees waived for studying Odia at the graduate and post-graduate level in colleges and universities, Byasakabi Fakir Mohan scholarship for high mark in Odia at plus two and plus three levels students, number of professors in Odia departments in colleges and universities will be increased to facilitate more research in the field of Odia language and literature. It was decided that established separate Odia University and Classical chair in JNU, BHU and Gujarat for research in Odia language, literature, Culture and Heritage of Odisha.

==== Odia Language Teacher ====
This campaign has been started In 2009, he had organised a meeting with students from various universities of the state to protest against the non-appointment of Odia language teachers to teach Odia in all secondary schools in Odisha since independence. A charter of demands was submitted to the then Mass Education Minister Pratap Jena to create odia teacher posts in all schools in the state and appoint special Odia language teachers. After long day demands, In 2015, the state government set up a ministerial committee. As a member of the committee, Dr. Prusty raised the demand. It was approved by the state cabinet after it was accepted by the committee.

==== My Language My Right ====
This campaign has been started to awaken the identity and self-respect of Odia among the people of Odisha. More than 70,000 people from 30 districts have joined the three-year-long campaign. The main objective of this campaign is to make people aware of their problems and their role in solving them.

==== Odia Biswabidyalaya Movement ====
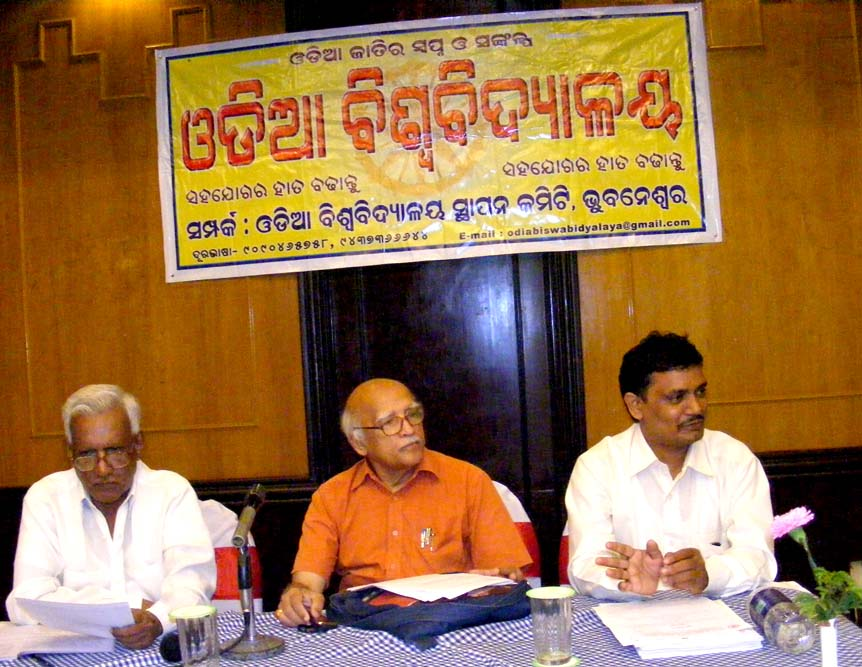
Establishment of Odia University

Odianess in Prusty evoked a spirit of establishing Odia Biswabidyalaya (transl. Odia University). He prepared a private membership bill and presented it at Odisha Legislative Assembly through Hon'ble member Dr. Sipra Mallick. For this purpose he started The Institute of Odia Studies and Research. His first success was when Odia was declared a Classical Language by the Government of India. The institute, which had played an important role in documenting the classical nature of the Odia language, along with the culture department, hopes to bring in other departments in the future.

==== CICO Movement ====
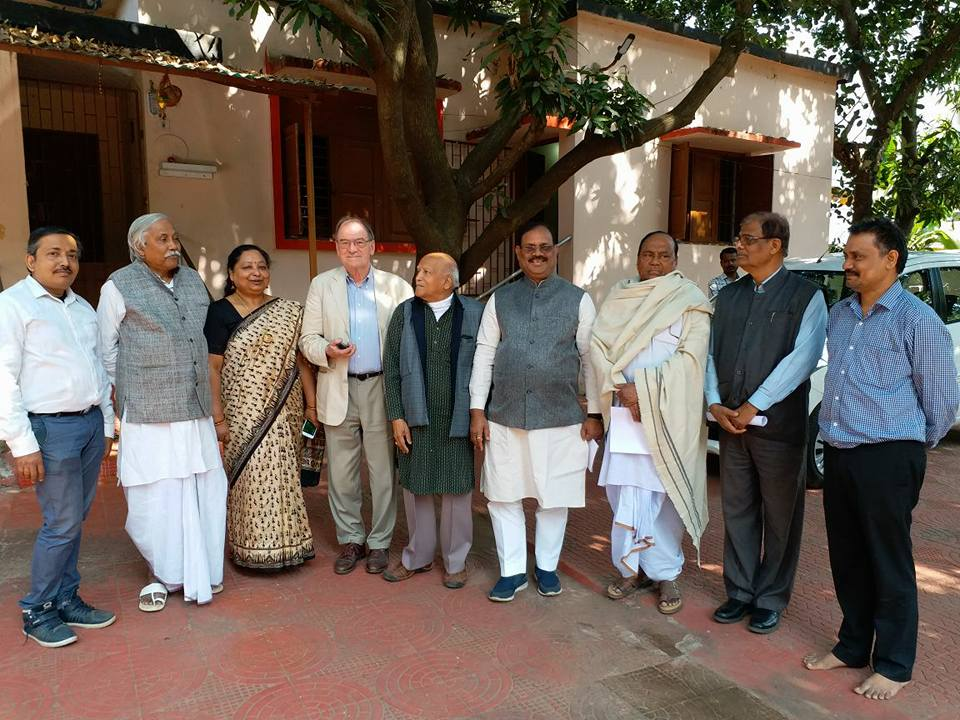
Noted international scholar Professor Herman Kulke (Padmashree) at IOSR Office

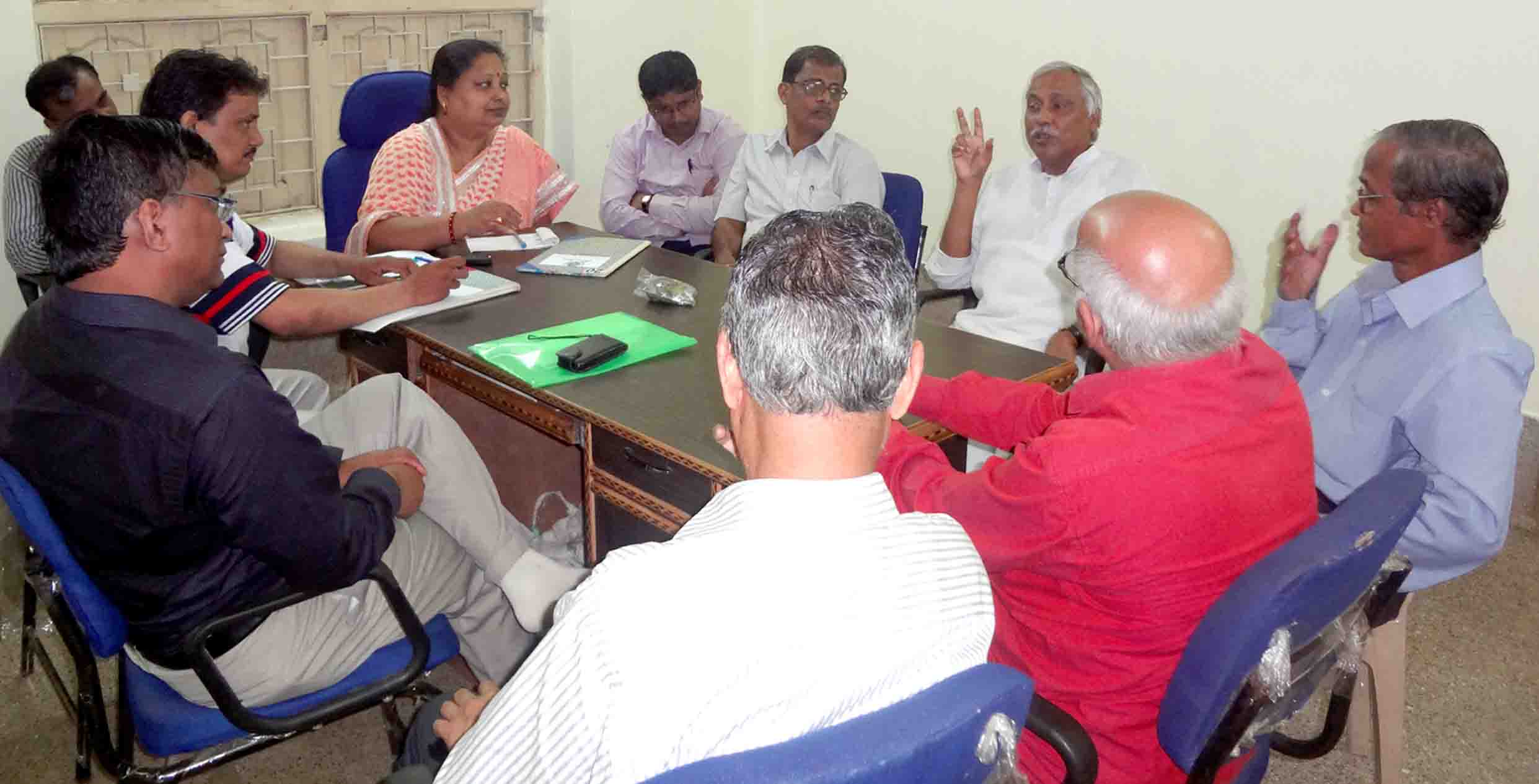
Meeting with organising committee members about the proposed Odia University and CICO at IOSR Office, Bhubaneswar

After helping the Odia language to receive classical status, Prusty's one-point mission is now to found an Odia-language university to create a body of knowledge and research in Odia and to develop the Odia language as a lingua franca like that of Palli or Sanskrit in ancient India and English in modern times.

==== Education in Odia: Employment in Odisha ====
This program has been started for 10 lakhs youth studying in Odia medium. As many as 600 colleges and 1,027 schools from 30 districts have joined the 12-year-long campaign. They are being informed about the kind of facilities provided by the Odisha government if they study in Odia and how they can become doctors, engineers, IAS. The main objective of this program is to work for the meritorious students of Odisha and utilize their knowledge in the development of Odisha. He was also giving free coaching to poor slum students through Odia Pathshala to crack various competitive exams.

== Selected works ==
=== Research and literary criticism books ===
- Shastriyata: Eka Sangharsha ISBN 978-93-48078-18-6 (2025)
- Shastriya Bhasa Odia ISBN 978-93-48078-95-7 (2025)
- Odia Bhasa Ra Utpati O Krama Bikasa ISBN 978-93-48078-60-5 (2025)
- Kalingatuparani: Katha nuhe Byatha ISBN 978-93-91638-73-3 (2023)
- Shastriyatara Shesa Swakshyara: Bhima Bhoi ISBN 978-93-91638-54-2 (2023)
- Bhasa Bhumi o Atma parichiti ISBN 978-93-91638-12-2 (2021)
- Jatiya Sikshyaniti −2020 O Odisha Sikshya Byabasthare Paribrttan ISBN 978-93-91638-03-0 (2021)
- Shastriyata: Ek Sangharsha ISBN 978-81-933604-7-7 (2021)
- Odia Jaga (2021)
- Kahibar Nohe se Kataka Chatakaku (2018)
- Odia Bhasara Utpatti O kramabikasha (2018)
- Sastriya Bhasa Odia (2017)
- Odia Padya Sahitya Parichya (2017)
- Classical Odia in Historical Perspective (2014) (co-authored with Debi Prasanna Pattanayak)
- Classical Odia (2013) (co-authored with Debi Prasanna Pattanayak)
- Bhasa o jatiyata (2010), can be found also in Odia Wikisource – ଭାଷା ଓ ଜାତୀୟତା
- Jati, jagruti o pragati (2009), can be found also in Odia Wikisource – ଜାତି ଜାଗୃତି ଓ ପ୍ରଗତି
- Odia Bhasa Sahitya Parichaya (2007)
- Prabandha Bharati (2005)
- Prasanga: Odia Bhasa o SahityaISBN 978-81-921406-0-5(2005)

=== Short stories ===
- Swapna Sabu Marigala Pare (2005)

=== Plays ===
- Mukti (2005)

=== University textbooks ===
- Prak Sarala Sahityara Prusthabhumi
- Silalekha Sahitya
- Prak Sarala Sahitya
- Prak Sarala Sahityara Bhasatatwika Adhyayan
- Prak Sarala Sahityara Mulyankana
- Sarala Sahityara Mulyankana (ISBN 978-81-942896-1-6)
- Panchasakha Sahityara Mulyankana (ISBN 978-81-942896-2-3)
- Bisesha Adhyana (Panchasakha) (ISBN 978-81-942896-3-0)
- Madhya Jugiya Odia Sahityara Prusthabhumi (ISBN 978-81-942896-5-4)
- Madhya Jugiya Odia Sahityara Angika Bichar (ISBN 978-81-942896-6-1)
- Madhya Jugiya Odia Sahityara Atmika Bibhaba (ISBN 978-81-942896-7-8)
- Madhya Jugiya Odia Sahityara Giti Parampara (ISBN 978-81-942896-8-5)

=== Book Editing ===
- "Language, Literature, Culture and Integrity" Vol I, ISBN 978-81-933604-0-8 (2016)
- "Language, Literature, Culture and Integrity" Vol II, ISBN 978-81-942780-0-9 (2019)
- "Language, Literature, Culture and Integrity" Vol III, ISBN 978-81-942780-5-4 (2020)
- "Language, Literature, Culture and Integrity" Vol IV, ISBN 978-81-942780-3-0 (2020)

=== Journals ===
- "Odia Bhasara Shastriya Manyata", published in Esana, the journal of the Institute of Oriya Studies, Vol. 59, Issue-II, Dec-2009.
- "Odia Upanyasara Samajika Prasangikata", published in Bartika, the journal of the Saraswata Sahitya Sanskrutika Parisad, Vol. 17, No-4, December-2010, pp. 707–712.
- "Tirjyak Sailire Bhaba Sampada", published in Esana Prabandhabali, the journal of the Institute of Oriya Studies, Vol. 24, 1st Publication-2005, PP- 185–192.
- "Galpa Srustire Naba Swakshyara", published in Esana Prabandhabali, the journal of the Institute of Oriya Studies, Vol. 25, 1st Publication-2006, PP- 191–202.
- "Bhasara Shastriya Manyata O Odia Bhasa", published in Konark, a quarterly literary journal, published by Orissa Sahitya Akademi, Bhubaneswar-14, Vol. 157, May–June–July 2010, pp. 41–59.
- "Odia Sanskrutaru Srusti ki?", published in Sambhabana, a monthly literary journal, Vol-13, No-9, April 2013, pp-15-20.
- "Odia Bhasara Shastriya Manyata pariprekshire Lekhakara Bhumika", published in the literary journal Sambhabana, Vol-14, No-3, Oct 2013.
- "Odia o Sanskrit", published in Sambhabana, a monthly literary journal, Vol-14, No-1, June 2013.
- "Kahibar Nuhen Se Kataka Chhatakaku...", published in Abarta, a monthly literary journal, Vol-31, No-10, October 2014, pp. 59– 63.
- "Odia Bhasara Shastriya Manyata O Eha Parabarti Karjya", published in Agamee Satabdi, Vol-16, No-45, Oct–13 Nov.
- "Odia Bhasar Sastriya Manyata; Dabi nuhen Adhikar", published in Utkal Prasanga, Information & Public Relations Department, Govt. of Odisha, Bhubaneswar-1. Vol 70, No 8, March 2014, pp. 79–86.
- "Classical Language: Odia", published in Odisha Review, Information & Public Relations Department, Govt. of Odisha, Bhubaneswar-1. Vol-70, No- 8, March-2014, pp 4– 13, ISSN 0970-8669.
- "Odia Bhasar Sastriya Manyata pare....", published in Utkal Prasanga, Information & Public Relations Department, Govt. of Odisha, Bhubaneswar-1. Vol-71, No- 1, August-2014, PP-25-30.
- "Odishara Prachina Samarakala O Paika Sanskruti", published in Sambhabana literary journal, Vol-16, No-3, October 2015.
- "Odishara Noubanijya", published in Utkal Prasanga, Information & public Relations Department, Govt. of Odisha, Bhubaneswar-1. Vol-70, No- 8, November-2015, PP-79-86.
- "Prachina Bharatiya Bhasa pariprekshire Odia Bhasa", published in Dhisana research journal, Vol-1, No-3, Oct–15 Dec, PP- 43–66.
- "Odia Bhsara Prathama Sahid", published in Utkal Prasanga, Information & Public Relations Department, Govt. of Odisha, Bhubaneswar-1. Vol 73, No. 9, April-2017, PP-44-48.
- "Odia Bhasa: Prachinata O Adhunikata" Devabhumi, published Viswa Sambad Kendra, 9th edition, 2017.
- "Shastriya Odiar Swapna O Sambhana", published Sahityayan, Edition 1, 2017, PP- 137–152.
- "Odia Bhasa Andolan O Ekabinsa Satabdire Ehar Ruparekha", published Urbi, Vol-VI, No-1, 2019, PP- 264–279.
- "Odia Bhasa Charcha banam Arjya Pralepa", published Urbi, Vol-VII, No-1, 2020, PP- 259–271.
- "Odia Sabda O Lipira moulikata Banam Dravida Manasikata", published Jhankar, Volume 73, Issue 3, June 2021, PP- 246–254.

=== Research papers ===
- "Samajika Prasangikata O Odia Upanyasa", published in Esana, the journal of the Institute of Oriya Studies, Vol. 61, December-2010, PP- 21–39.
- "Evolution of Odia Language, its Struggle for Existence & Excellence", published in Odisha Review, Information & Public Relations Department, Govt. of Odisha, Bhubaneswar-1. Vol-LXXII, No- 9, April-202016, pp 20– 23, ISSN 0970-8669.
- "WHY NOT ODIA", published in National Conference Organised by sri Jagannath Seva Samiti, Kolkata. Issue No:9, July-2014, pp 20– 24.
- "Prakruta, Sanskruta, Pali O Odia Bhasa", published in Souvenir of 2nd National Language Conference-2015 at Institute of Physics, Bhubaneswar, Odisha, Dt. 30 March- 2 April 2015, pp-38-42.
- "Foreign Trade and Colonisation of Ancient Odisha", published in "Language, Literature, Culture and Integrity" (Vol-II), pp-55-70, Proceedings of 3rd National Language Conference −2016 on the 25th – 28 March 2016, IIT Bhubaneswar, Odisha.
- "Jhoti-Chita-Muruja: The Therapeutic Art forms as a Cultural Practice in the Kaleidoscope of Linguistics Landscape of Odisha", co-author with Dr. Biswanandan Dash, Ms Sikha Nayak. International Conference on Linguistics Landscaping Department of Linguistics, North-Eastern Hill University (NEHU), Shillong, 21–23 June 2017.
- "Adhunik Kalara Odia Bhasa Andolan o Dakshina Odisha", published in Book of Abstracts of 4th National Language Conference-2017, National Institute of Science and Technology (NIST) at Berhampur, Odisha, Dt. 6–9 July 2017.
- "Sambalpuri to Kosali: A New Path", Convention on Kosali- Sambalpuri language by Sahitya Akademi (National Academy of Letters), New Delhi-1 Dt. 2nd −3rd December2017 at Bhubaneswar.
- "Origin and Development of Indian Scripts: A Positional Study", International Conference of South Asian Languages and Literatures (ICOSAL-13) Co- Author with Dr. Biswanandan Dash at the Central Institute of Indian Languages (CIIL), Mysuru, India during 8–10 January 2018.
- "Indian Script and Vikramkhol Inscription", National Conference of Lipi Literature at Ravenshaw University, Odisha, Dt. 3 February 2018 at Cuttack.
- "Period of Sarala Mahabharat", an International Seminar of Sarala Mahabharat, Ravenshaw University, Odisha Dt. 9–10 March 2018 at Cuttack.
- "Exploring Invisible Speech in Ritual Art: A Combinational Study in Cultural-Linguistic Landscape", published in Indian Journal of Applied Linguistics, Vol. 44, No. 1-2, Jan–Dec 2018, pp 187–205, ISSN 0379-0037.
- "Gangeridai: Myth and Reality", published in "Language, Literature, Culture and Integrity" (Vol-IV), Proceedings of 5th National Language Conference-2019, Ravenshaw University, Cuttack, Dt. 4–7 February 2019, pp 321–326.
- "Bikramkhol Inscription ek lipitatwika adhyana", published in Book of Abstracts of 6th National Language Conference-2020, Sambalpur University, Sambalpur, Dt. 23–26 February 2020.
- "Prachina Bharatiya Lipi pariprekshire Kalinga Brahmi", published in Book of Abstracts of 7th National Language Conference-2021, SriJagannath Sanskrit University, Puri, Dt. 31 March-1 April 2021.
- "Origin & Development of Odia Language & Scripts", Published in Souvenir of National Seminar on The Wonders of Bharatiya Bhasha, Rishihood University, NCR of Delhi, Sonepat, Haryana on 15th - 16th Dec 2022.
- "Sashtriya Odia Bhasa bibartanare Lipira Vhumika", Published in Souvenir of National Seminar on Classical Odia in historical perspective, Organised by Centre of Excellence for Studies in Classical Odia, Central Institute of Indian Languages, Bhubaneswar on 11–12 March 2021.
- "Prabasare Odia Bhasa, Sahitya O Snskrutira Sangharsha Chitra", Maricus Girimitia Sahitya: Published in Souvenir of International Conference on 'Pravasi Odia Sahitya', Organised by Central University of Odisha, Dt. 23–25 March 2023.

== Bibliography ==
- Prusty, Subrat Kumar (2014). "Classical Language: Odia" (PDF). Odisha Review (March): 4.
- Prusty, Dr Subrat. "Classical_Language_Odia-_BOOK_1". www.academia.edu.
- Prusty, Dr Subrat. "Classical_Language_Odia-_BOOK_2". www.academia.edu.
- Prusty, Dr Subrat. "Classical_Language_Odia-_BOOK_3". www.academia.edu.
- Prusty, Dr Subrat. "Classical_Language_odia-_Book_4". www.academia.edu.
- Prusty, Dr Subrat. "Photo_of_the_Classical_Odia_Document". www.academia.edu.
- Dash, Biswanandan and; Prusty, Dr Subrat. "Origin and Development of Indian Scripts A Positional Study". www.academia.edu.
