= Sampadananda Mishra =

Indian Sanskrit scholar

- Born: 17 November 1971 (age 54); Odisha, India
- Education: Utkal University
- Occupations: Sanskrit scholar, editor and author
- Writing career
- Language: Sanskrit, Odia, English
- Genres: Sanskrit, Indian literature

Sampadananda Mishra (Odia: ସମ୍ପଦାନନ୍ଦ ମିଶ୍ର, born 17 November 1971) is a Sanskrit scholar from Odisha, specializing in grammar. Mishra was awarded the Maharshi Badrayan Vyas Award for Sanskrit in 2012 by the President of India Pratibha Patil. He was conferred with Sahitya Akademi Bala Puraskar 2018 for his book Shanaih Shanaih. Detailed profile of him can be seen HERE.

== Education and career ==
Grandson of a Sanskrit Pandit, Mishra received a post-graduate degree in Sanskrit from Utkal University. He received an MPhil in Sanskrit Grammar from under V. Kutumba Sastry of Pondicherry University and completed his doctorate from Utkal University on Sanskrit and the evolution of human speech.

From September 1995 to March 2021, Mishra served as the director of Sri Aurobindo Foundation for Indian Culture (SAFIC), Puducherry. Currently, Mishra works as Dean - Culture and Director of the Centre for Human Sciences at Rishihood University, Haryana.

== Books ==
Some of his books are:

- Sampadananda Mishra. Sanskrit and the Evolution of Human Speech. Sri Aurobindo Institute of Research in Social Sciences, 2006. ISBN 978-81-7060-236-1. 171 pp.
- Sampadananda Mishra. Stotravali: A Book of Hymns and Prayers in Sanskrit. Sri Aurobindo Institute of Research in Social Sciences, 2006. ISBN 978-81-7060-203-3. 316 pp.
- Sampadananda Mishra (ed.). The Century of Life of Sri Aurobindo with original verses of Bhartrihari. Sri Aurobindo Institute of Research in Social Sciences, 2005. ISBN 978-81-7060-120-3. 128 pp.
- Sampadananda Mishra. Sri Aurobindo and Sanskrit. Sri Aurobindo Institute of Research in Social Sciences, 2001. ISBN 978-81-7060-159-3. 118 pp.
- Sampadananda Mishra and Vijay Poddar. The wonder that is Sanskrit. Mapin Publishing Gp Pty Ltd, 2001. ISBN 978-1-890206-50-5. 210 pp.
- Sampadananda Mishra. Hasyamanjari: A book of humorous stories in Sanskrit. Sri Aurobindo Institute of Research in Social Sciences, 2001. ISBN 978-81-7060-162-3. 42 pp.
- Sampadananda Mishra. Chandovallari: A handbook of Sanskrit prosody. Sri Aurobindo Institute of Research in Social Sciences, 1999. ISBN 978-81-7060-123-4. 147 pp.
- Sampadananda Mishra. Shanaih Shaniah - A book of Rhyming Songs in Sanskrit, AuroPublications, Sri Aurobindo Society, Pondicherry. ISBN 978-81-7060-381-8. 56pp

== Unique initiatives ==
=== Divyavani Sanskrit Radio ===
In August 2013 Mishra launched the first ever 24/7 Sanskrit Radio called 'Divyavani Sanskrit Radio'.

=== Samskrita Balasahitya Parishad ===
In 2014 Mishra founded Samskrita Balasahitya Parishad for creating, evaluating and propagating qualitative children's literature in Sanskrit.

=== Vande Mataram Library ===
The library plans to publish several volumes of religious and non-religious Sanskrit texts with translations. Mishra floated the idea of an indigenous effort in translating Sanskrit texts, a few days after Hindu Nationalists lodged a petition against the Murty Classical Library of India (MCLI); it was argued that the MCLI works were of a high quality but lacked in cultural understandings. Thus, he co-founded the Vande Mataram Library Trust, an open-source project to translate almost all important scriptures available in Sanskrit.
