= Annette Schmiedchen =

German author

- Born: 1966 (age 59–60); Germany
- Occupation: Indologist
- Known for: Sanskrit epigraphy
- Awards: Padma Shri

Annette Schmiedchen is a German author, scholar of Sanskrit epigraphy, indologist, a researcher at the Humboldt University of Berlin and a member of faculty of Indology at Martin Luther University of Halle-Wittenberg. She is the author of several articles on Indian heritage and Culture and the book, Herrschergenealogie und Religioses Patronat: Die Inschriftenkultur der Rastrakutas, Silaharas und Yadavas, the 17th book released under the series, Gonda Indological Studies by Brill Publishers. The Government of India honoured her in 2015 with the award of Padma Shri, the fourth highest Indian civilian award.

== Biography ==
Annette Schmiedchen, born in Germany in 1966, did her studies on Indian History and Indology at the Humboldt University of Berlin and later at the Martin Luther University of Halle-Wittenberg. She obtained her doctoral degree from Humboldt University of Berlin in 1994 on the thesis, Grants of Villages, Land, and Money in Favour of Buddhist Monasteries in Northern India from the 5th to the 8th Centuries after which she submitted a Habilitation thesis on Epigraphical Culture and Regional Tradition in Early Medieval Maharashtra: Legitimizing Political Power and Official Religious Patronage under the Royal Dynasties of the Rastrakutas, Silaharas, and Yadavas from the 8th to the 13th Centuries to Martin Luther University of Halle-Wittenberg in 2008 to secure a Habilitation degree a year later. She works as a member of faculty of the Martin Luther University and pursues research on a European Research Council funded project on Medieval Foundations and Endowments at Humboldt University.

Schmiedchen is a regular visiter to India since 1992 for her researches and has written several articles, in German and English, on Indian culture and Sanskrit epigraphy. Her maiden book, Herrschergenealogie und religiöses Patronat. Die Inschriftenkultur der Rastrakutas, Silaharas und Yadavas, was released in 2014. She is an honorary Research Fellow of the International Association of Sanskrit Studies and is associated with Jawaharlal Nehru University and the Indian Council for Cultural Relations who funded her first project in India. She is married to Rainer Schmiedchen who is the Consul General of Germany in Kolkata. The Government of India included her in the 66th Republic Day honours list, in 2015, for the civilian award of Padma Shri for her contributions to Sanskrit language and Indology.

== See also ==
- Martin Luther University of Halle-Wittenberg
- Humboldt University of Berlin
- Epigraphy
- Indology
- International Association of Sanskrit Studies
- Indian Council for Cultural Relations
