= Maharshi Badrayan Vyas Samman =

Presidential awards in literature (India)

The awards of Certificate of Honour and Maharshi Badrayan Vyas Samman are Indian Presidential honours which are conferred on academics by the President of India once a year on the Indian Independence Day, celebrated on 15 August; in recognition of their substantial contribution in the various fields of languages including Arabic, Kannada, Sanskrit, Malayalam, Oriya, Pali, Persian, Prakrit and the Telugu language.

The awards come under the umbrella of the language division of the Ministry of Education's Department of Higher Education. The award takes its name from Bādarāyaṇa, the founder of the Vedanta system of Philosophy, who wrote the Vedāntasūtra k.a. Brahmasūtra.

== Introductory years ==
The Certificate of Honour for Arabic Persian and Sanskrit languages were introduced in 1958 and certificates for Pali and Prakrit were introduced in 1966.

The Maharshi Badrayan Vyas Samman award was introduced in the 2002 for Arabic Persian and Sanskrit and also for Pali and Prakrit languages. Since the year 2016, both the Certificate of Honourand and the Maharshi Badrayan Vyas Samman have been conferred upon scholars of classical Kannada, classical Malayalam, classical Oriya and the classical Telugu language.

== Age criteria and content of award ==
The Certificate of Honour-i is awarded to selected Indian scholars having an age of 60 years or above. It honour includes a certificate, a memento and one time cash of five hundred thousand Indian rupees. The Certificate of Honour-ii is awarded to selected scholars Overseas Indians and foreigners of non-Indian origin, who aged 60 years or above. The award constitutes a certificate, a memento and one time cash of five hundred thousand Indian rupees.

The Maharshi Badrayan Vyas Samman is conferred upon selected young scholars aged between 30 and 45. It constituted a certificate of honour, a memento and a one time cash of one hundred thousand Indian rupees.

== For classical Tamil ==
The awards for classical Tamil is provided by President of India separately every year. First recognised classical language in 2004. Award was introduced in 2005 and is managed by the Central Institute of Classical Tamil, an autonomous institution under the language division of Ministry of Education's Department of Higher Education. These awards have certain distinctions:

1. Tholkāppiyar Award (equivalent to Certificate of Honour-i)
2. Kural Peedam Award (equivalent to Certificate of Honour-ii)
3. Young Scholar Award (equivalent to Maharshi Badrayan Vyas Samman - age limit: 30–40 years)

== Recipients ==
=== Certificate of Honour ===
==== Sanskrit ====
- Sripada Satyanarayanamurthy
- Rajendra Nath Sarma
- Ramji Thakur
- Chand Kiran Saluja
- ShriKrishan Sharma
- V. Ramakrishna Bhatt
- Vidwan Janardana Hegde
- Kala Acharya
- Harekrishna Satapathy
- Pandit Satya Dev Sharma
- Shri Banwari Lal Gaur
- V.S. Karunakaran
- Yugal Kishor Mishra
- Manudev Bhattacharya
- Subuddhi Charan Goswami

==== Pali ====
- Uma Shankar Vyas

==== Prakrit ====
- Kamal Chand Sogani

==== Arabic ====
- Faizanullah Farooqi
- Mohammad Iqbal Husain
- Mohd. Samiullah Khan

==== Persian ====
- Iraq Raza Zaidi
- Chander Shekhar
- Mohammad Sidiq Niazmand

==== Classical Kannada ====
- Hampa Nagarajaiah

==== Classical Telugu ====
- Ravva Srihari

==== Classical Malayalam ====
- C.P. Achuthan Unny

==== Classical Odia ====
- Antaryami Mishra

== Maharshi Badrayan Vyas Samman ==
=== 2012 ===
==== Sanskrit ====
- Sampadananda Mishra
- Chandra Bhushan Jha
- Malihar Arvind Kulkarni
- Narayan Dash
- Sasibhushan Mishra

==== Persian ====
- Asad Ali Khurshid

==== Sanskrit ====
- Balram Shukla

=== 2019 ===
==== Sanskrit ====
- Ashok Thapliyal
- Sujata Tripathi
- Sanju Mishra
- Abhijit Hanmant Joshi
- Sharachchandra Dwivedi

==== Pali ====
- Ms. Anoma Shriram Sakhare

==== Prakrit ====
- Ashish Kumar Jain

==== Arabic ====
- Fauzan Ahmad

==== Persian ====
- M. Shahbaz Alam

==== Classical Kannada ====
- G.B. Harisha
- S. Karthik
- M. Byrappa

==== Classical Telugu ====
- Addanki Srinivas
- V. Triveni
- D.K. Prabhakar

==== Classical Malayalam ====
- Rajeev R.R.
- Santhosh Thottingal

==== Classical Odia ====
- Subrat Kumar Prusty
