= V. Kutumba Sastry =

Indian academic (born 1950)

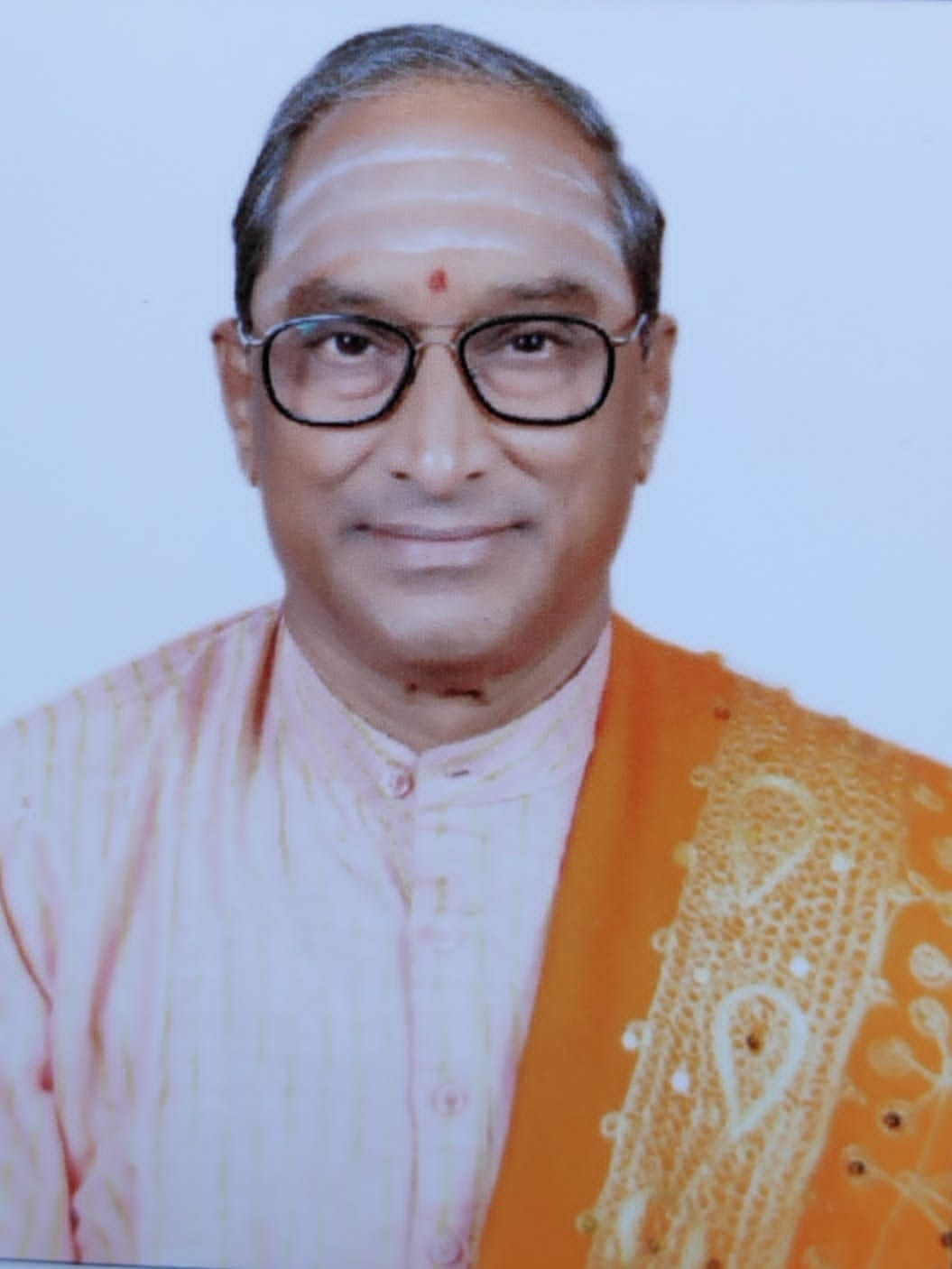
V. Kutumba Sastry

Vempati Kutumba Sastry (born 1950) is an Indian academic. He was the Vice-Chancellor of the Rashtriya Sanskrit Sansthan, for the period 2003 to 2008. He is the president of the International Association of Sanskrit Studies. He was a member of the organising committee of the fifteenth World Sanskrit Conference. He is a member of the governing board of the Wider Association of Vedic Studies. He is on the editorial board of the Indologica Taurinensia, The Journal of the International Association of Sanskrit Studies, published from Turin. Government of India conferred Padma Shri Award on the eve of Republic Day in 2026.
