= Thiruvalluvar Award =

Tamil literary award

Thiruvalluvar Award is an annual award given by the State Government of Tamil Nadu, India, in memory of the ancient poet-philosopher Valluvar. It is given to those who have made an outstanding contribution towards the Kural literature and its philosophy. It has been given on behalf of Tamil Development Authority in January every year since 1986, on the 2nd day of the Tamil month of Thai observed by the Tamil Nadu government as the Thiruvalluvar Day.

== The award ==
The award carries a cash prize of ₹ 100,000, a 1-sovereign gold medal, and a citation. The award originally included a cash prize of ₹ 10,000. From 1991, the prize amount was increased to ₹ 20,000. From 1999, the prize amount was again increased to the current measure of ₹ 100,000.

== Recipients ==
S.No.	Year	Recipient	Image	Birth / Death	Country	Description
1	1986	Kundrakudi Adigalar		1925–1995	India	Hindu spiritual guru
2	1987	K. A. P. Viswanatham		1899–1994	India	
3	1988	S. Dandapani Desikar			India	
4	1989	V. Suba. Manikkam		1917–1989	India	
5	1990	K. S. Anandan		1934–1999	India	
6	1991	Sundarashanmuganar		1922–1997	India	
7	1992	'Navalar' Nedunchezhiyan		1920–2000	India	
8	1993	Kallai D. Kannan			India	
9	1994	Thirukkuralar V. Munusamy		1913–1994	India	Awarded posthumously.
10	1995	S. Sivakamasundari			India	
11	1996	M. Govindasamy			India	
12	1997	K. Mohanraj			India	
13	1998	Ira. Sarangapani			India	
14	1999	V. S. Kulandhaisamy		1929–2016	India	
15	2000	T. S. K. Kannan			India	
16	2001	V. M. Sethuraman			India	
17	2002	I. Sundaramurthi			India	
18	2003	K. Mangaiyarkarasi			India	
19	2004	R. Muthukumarasamy			India	
20	2005	P. Arangasamy			India	
21	2006	Aru. Alagappan			India	
22	2007	K. P. Aravanan		1941–2018	India	
23	2008	Kundrakudi Ponnambala Adigalar			India	
24	2009	Pon Kodhandaraman (Porko)			India	Tamil academic and former Madras University vice-chancellor.
25	2010	Iravatham Mahadevan		1930–2018	India	
26	2011	P. Valan Arasu			India	
27	2012	S. Varadharajan			India	Founder—Kural Manam monthly magazine
28	2013	N. Murugan			India	
29	2014	Yu Hsi		1951–	Taiwan	The first foreign scholar to receive the Thiruvalluvar award.
30	2015	K. Baskaran		1951–	India	
31	2016	V. G. Santhosam			India	
32	2017	P. Veeramani			India	Tamil scholar.
33	2018	G. Periyannan			India	
34	2019	M. G. Anwar Bacha			India	
35	2020	N. Nithyanandha Bharathi			India	
36	2021	Vaigai Selvan			India	
37	2022	M. Meenakshi Sundaram			India	Former president of Bengaluru Tamil Sangam
38	2023	Iraniyan N. K. Ponnusamy			India	
39	2024	Balamuruganadi Swamigal			India	
40	2025	Perumpulavar M. Padikkaramu			India	
41	2026	M. P. Sathiyavel Murugan			India	

== See also ==
- Kural Peedam Award
