= Yu Hsi =

Taiwanese Tamil poet and scholar

- Born: 16 March 1951 (age 75); Fangyuan Township, Taiwan
- Occupations: Poet, scholar
- Known for: Translating Tirukkural in Mandarin
- Website: www.yuhsi.com

Topics in Tamil literature
Sangam Literature
Five Great Epics
| Silappatikaram | Manimekalai |
| Civaka Cintamani | Valayapathi |
| Kundalakesi |
Five Minor Epics
| Neelakesi | Culamani |
| Naga Kumara Kaviyam | Udayana Kumara Kaviyam |
| Yashodhara Kaviyam |
Bhakti Literature
| Naalayira Divya Prabandham | Kamba Ramayanam |
| Tevaram | Tirumurai |
Tamil people
| Sangam | Sangam landscape |
| Tamil history from Sangam literature | Ancient Tamil music |
| Religion in ancient Tamilakam |

Yu Hsi (born Hung Ching Yu) (born March 16, 1951) is a Taiwanese Tamil poet and scholar who has translated the Tirukkural and the poems of Subramaniya Bharathi and poet Bharathidasan in Mandarin. He is the founder and president of the Tamil Sangam in Taiwan. He has received various awards, including awards from Seoul World Academy of Arts and Culture (2004), Thiruvalluvar Award (2014), and a felicitation from former President of India A. P. J. Abdul Kalam.

== Personal life ==
Yu Hsi was born Hung Ching Yu in Fangyuan township, Taiwan, on 16 March 1951. He obtained a doctorate in letters. He has authored more than 60 books. In a unique literary style, he wrote his fifth long-form novel on tradition scrolls, which contained almost 600,000 words. He has also translated Tamil classic Thirukkural, poems of Bharathiyar and Bharathidasan and Avvaiyar's "Aathichoodi" (containing morals) into Mandarin. He has been ordained a Buddhist monk as Dao Yi.

== Indian religion and philosophy ==
Yu Hsi was very interested in Hinduism and Indian philosophy. According to him, great wisdom lay in the Indian religion and philosophy. He counted Hindu god Ganesh as his favorite for having scripted the Mahabharata as told by sage Vedavyas. According to Yu Hsi, Lord Ganesha typifies the journey of enlightenment, just like those of ancient Buddhist monks. He also considers the characters of Krishna and Arjuna to have influenced him greatly.

== Translating the Tirukkural ==
In May 2010, Yu Hsi had a chance meeting with former President of India A. P. J. Abdul Kalam when the latter presented him with a copy of the Tirukkural and a golden statue of Buddha. The Kural text reminded him of the Hindu mythologies of Ramayana and Mahabharata and their virtuous characters, which he was fascinated about 30 years earlier. Yu Hsi then agreed to translate the Thirukkural into Chinese and completed it in about three months. He also installed a life-size statue of Valluvar, the author of the Kural text, in Taiwan.

== Awards ==
In 2004, Yu Hsi was awarded the Poet Laureate, the highest honour awarded by Seoul World Academy of Arts and Culture.

In praise of his translation of the Tirukkural in Mandarin, the Tamil Nadu government awarded ₹540,000. Yu Hsi, however, donated the amount to Tamil University for setting up of an endowment to propagate Tirukkural.

In 2008, Yu Hsi received the Jan Smrek Prize in Bratislava, Slovakia, for his poetry inspired by Buddhism. On the occasion, his five long poems were published in Slovak translation under the title "Cesta" (Road).

In 2014, he received the Thiruvalluvar award from the Government of Tamil Nadu. Yu Hsi is the first foreign scholar to receive the Thiruvalluvar award.

== See also ==
- Translations of Tirukkural
- List of translators
