= John Ralston Marr =

English Indologist and writer (1927–2022)

- Born: 5 July 1927; Leatherhead, Surrey, England
- Died: 19 May 2022 (aged 94); England
- Occupations: Writer; Indologist
- Known for: Tamil Studies
- Awards: Padma Shri; Kural Peedam Award

John Ralston Marr (5 July 1927 – 19 May 2022) was an English Indologist, writer and a member of faculty at the School of Oriental and African Studies, London.

He is known as a scholar of Carnatic music and Tamil literature and is the author of several publications including An introduction to colloquial Tamil, The Pĕriya purāṇam frieze at Tārācuram : episodes in the lives of the Tamil Śaiva saints, The eight Tamil anthologies, with special reference to Pur̲anān̲ūr̲u and Patir̲r̲uppattu and Letterature dravidiche, the last one in the Italian language. His book, An introduction to Colloquial Tamil. is a prescribed text for post graduate studies in Tamil language at the School of Oriental and African Languages and he presented a paper at the Fourth International Conference Seminar of Tamil Studies at Jaffna, in 1974.

He is a founder trustee of the Bharatiya Vidya Bhavan, UK and a recipient of the 2011 Kural Peedam Award of the Central Institute of Classical Tamil, an autonomous institution under the Ministry of Human Resource Development.

The Government of India awarded him the fourth highest civilian honour of the Padma Shri, in 2009, for his contributions to education.

Marr died on 19 May 2022, at the age of 94.
