= Balram Shukla =

Indian poet and academic

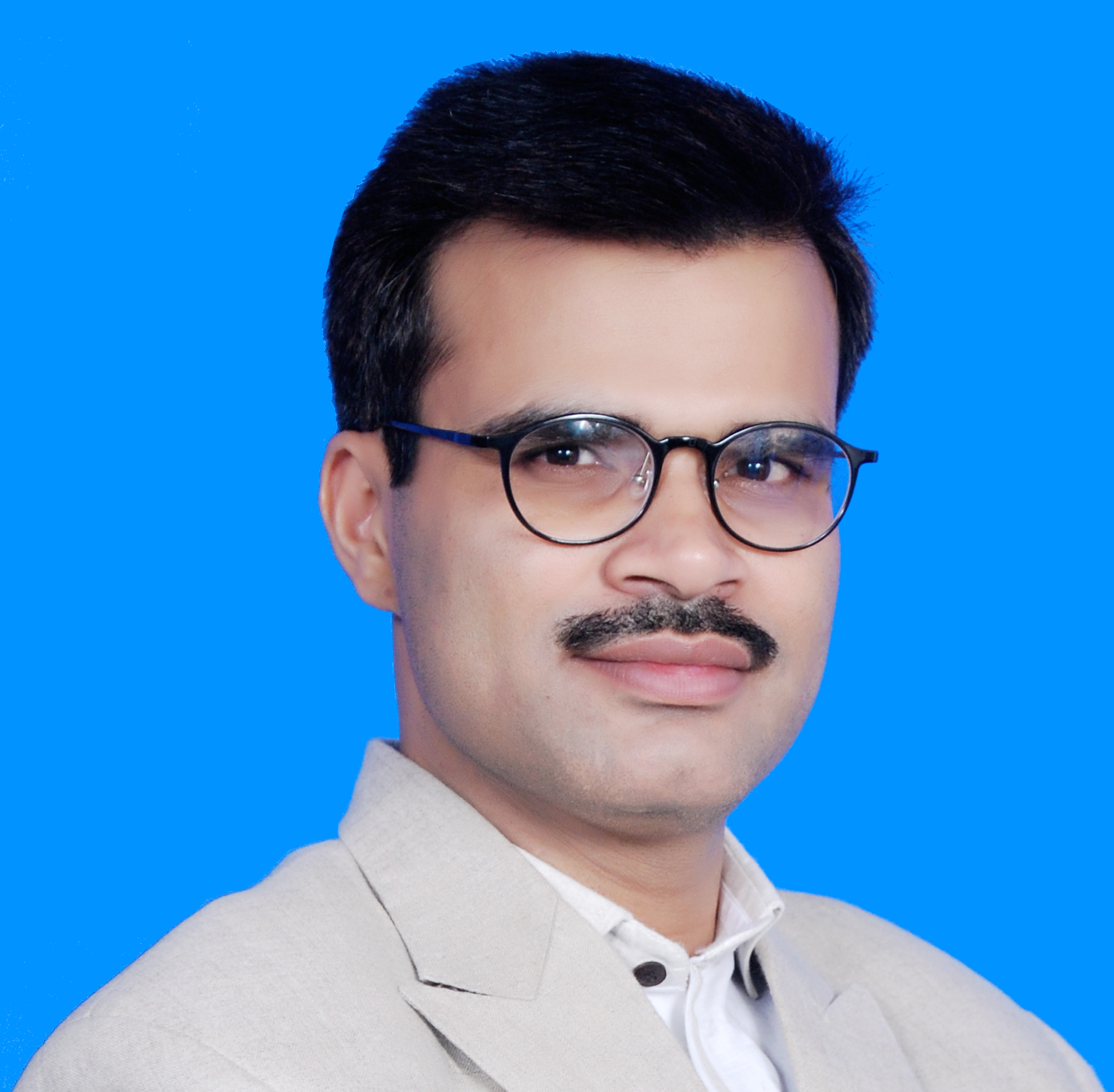
- Born: 19 January 1982 (age 44); Maharajganj, Uttar Pradesh, India
- Education: University of Delhi
- Occupations: Professor, Poet
- Writing career
- Language: Sanskrit, Persian, Prakrit
- Genres: Sanskrit, Indian literature

Balram Shukla (Hindi: बलराम शुक्ल; born 19 January 1982) is an academician, poet and author based in New Delhi. He is a self-taught scholar of Sanskrit and Indian literature. He works as a professor of Sanskrit at the University of Delhi. He is a scholar of Sanskrit, Hindi, Urdu, Persian and Prakrit. He writes poetry in both Sanskrit and Persian, and also translates Persian poetry into Sanskrit using the same poetic metres. He has been awarded the Badrayan Vyas Award for Sanskrit in 2013 by the President of India. He has authored eight books.

== Life ==
Shukla hails from Sohrauna Raja village in Maharajganj, Uttar Pradesh. His father is a retired school teacher. His initial education was at Maharajganj. He received a Bachelor of Arts degree from Gorakhpur and Master of Arts degrees in Sanskrit and Persian from University of Delhi. Shukla topped in both subjects and received the C D Deshmukh gold medal. Shukla then received a PhD in Sanskrit grammar from the University of Delhi. Shukla took up research in Persian after completing his research in Sanskrit.

Since 2004, Shukla has taught in various colleges affiliated to the University of Delhi, including Hindu College and Hans Raj College. Currently, he is a professor in University of Delhi's Department of Sanskrit.

From 2020 to 2022, he was a research fellow at the Indian Institute of Advanced Study (IIAS) Shimla. He worked on the topic, "प्राकृत कविता के चारुत्व के भाषिक प्रयोजक". His project aims to identify and explicate those linguistic peculiarities of Prakrit languages which have been exploited by poets to embellish their poetry and transcend the beauty of prior literature.

From 2023 to 2026, he will serve as the director of Swami Vivekananda Cultural Centre, Tehran, Iran with diplomatic rank of First Secretary.

== Recognition ==
Shukla is recognized as one of the foremost young scholars of Sanskrit today. He is well known in India and Iran for his knowledge of Sanskrit and Persian, his expertise in Sanskrit grammar, and his poetry in Sanskrit. He often translates Persian poetry into Sanskrit in the same metre as the original.

Shukla has translated 100 Ghazals of Rumi along with several appendices, directly from Persian into Hindi. The book was recently launched in Iran's Art Bureau in the presence of the author. Literary critics have immensely praised the book for being a pioneering work in Hindi and as a model for translation. From a review in The Hindu : "The book is a model of how translations of poetic works should be presented so that the readers may become familiar not only with the beauty of the poetry but also the richness of the literary traditions of that language, history of translations, meaning of words and basic principles of its grammar."

Shukla's Persian odes have recently been collected in a volume called "Haft Shaair az Fardaa" which contain sample-poems of 7 non-Iranian young Persian poets.

=== Awards and honours ===
Shukla has been conferred many honours. Some of these are

- 2012: Gold medal in Persian Master of Arts course, University of Delhi.
- 2012: Honoured by Mahmoud Ahmadinejad, the then President of Iran, for contributions to Persian literature.
- 2013: Maharshi Badrayan Vyas Samman by Pranab Mukherjee, the President of India.
- "Pt. Pratap Narayan Mishra Yuva Sahityakara Samman" conferred by Bhaurao Deoras Seva Nyas, Lucknow on 2 October 2017
- Shukla has three Sanskrit poetry collections to his credit. One amongst them is "Parivaahah" which has been published by Sahitya Akademi Delhi ( ISBN 978-81260-4787-1) This book also have been awarded with "Kalidasa Samman" by Uttar Pradesh Sanskrit Sansthan in 2018.
- 2021: Conferred with the “Mahakavi Kalidasa Sanskrit-Vrati National Award” by Kavikulguru Kalidasa Sanskrit University, Ramtek, Nagapur (Maharashtra).
- 2022: Conferred with the “Mahakavi Kalidasa Sanskrit-Vrati National Award” by Kavikulguru Kalidasa Sanskrit University, Ramtek, Nagapur (Maharashtra).

== Views ==
Shukla believes that Sanskrit and Persian have around 350 similar words, owing to their common origin. Shukla says that the influence of some Persian poets like Rumi and Hafez Shirazi is seen in the poetry of several Indian languages including Sanskrit, as well as on Persian poets from India like Bedil Dehalvi. Regarding Sanskrit poetry, Shukla believes that even today, Sanskrit poetry is being composed in the same metres and on the same topics as in Vedic times, and that India has poets who can compose poetry like Valmiki and Vyasa even today.

== Works ==
=== Books ===
- Shukla, Balram (2025) ‘Bhāratīya Jñāna Paramparā : Sātatya evam Saṁvardhana’, An exhaustive theoretical account of how the Indian knowledge tradition has remained continuous and generative through the ages. New Delhi: Vāṇī Prakāśana, ISBN 978-93-73482-27-9 (Hard Cover), 978-93-73488-61-5 (Paper Back). (Press Coverage)
- Shukla, Balram [Trans.](2021) Nihshabd-Noopur (Collection and Hindi Translation of Rumi's 100 Ghazals, First paperback edition, Second Edition - December 2021). New Delhi: Rajkamal Paperbacks. ISBN 978-93-90971-62-6
- Shukla, Balram [ed.] (2021) Paśyantī (A Collection of poems of 75 contemporary Sanskrit poets), Prayagraj: Raka Prakashan. ISBN 978-93-90964-27-7
- Shukla, Balram (2020, 1398hq) Zāfrān-o-Sandal (زعفران و صندل) (A Collection of Persian Ghazals), Tehran: Mo,assase-e-farhangi-e-shāerān-e-Pārsīzabān ISBN 978-622-99165-6-8
- Shukla, Balram (Ed.)(2019) Śatāvadhāniracanāsaṃcayanam (Edited 7 beautiful compositions of modern Sanskrit poet Śatāvadhānī Dr. R. Ganesh with elaborate introduction and 600 notes to the same). New Delhi : Sahitya Akademi. ISBN 978-93-89195-01-9
- Shukla, Balram (Trans.)(2018) Nihshabd-Noopur (Collection and Hindi Translation of Rumi's 100 Ghazals). New Delhi : MGAHV Wardha and Rajkamal. ISBN 978-93-88183-25-3
- Shukla, Balram (2017) ‘Kavitāputrikājātiḥ’, (an original Sanskrit poetry collection) New Delhi: Rashtriya Sanskrit sansthan, ISBN 978-93-82091-68-4
- Shukla, Balram (2016). Parivahah (परीवाहः), a collection of Sanskrit poems. ISBN 978-81-260-4787-1. Published by Sahitya Akademi
- Shukla, Balram and Paramanand Jha (2015). Laghusandesham (लघुसन्देशम्), a collection of short Sanskrit poems. ISBN 978-93-85539-03-9.
- Shukla, Balram (2014). Hindi translation of Dawazdeh Band of Muhtasham Kashani. Rampur, India: Rampur Raza Library. ISBN 978-93-82949-20-6.
- Shukla, Balram (2013). Bharatiya evam pashchattya vakyartha siddhanta (भारतीय एवं पाश्चात्त्य वाक्यार्थ सिद्धान्त), a Hindi research work on Indian and Western theories of sentential meaning. New Delhi, India: Pratibha Prakashan. ISBN 978-81-7702-335-0.
- Shukla, Balram (2011). Isq-o-Atesh (عشق و آتش), a collection of Persian poems. Tehran, Iran: Midhat Publication. ISBN 978-600-5312-11-9.
- Shukla, Balram (2009). Adhunik Sanskrit Sahitya Sanchayan (आधुनिक संस्कृत साहित्य संचयन), a Hindi research work on modern Sanskrit poetry in India. Delhi: Vidyanidhi Publication. ISBN 978-81-86700-86-0.

=== Example poetry ===
Shukla's symmetrical (in the same metre) translation into Sanskrit of the opening couplets of Rumi's Masnavi, along with the 1898 English translation by Edward Henry Whinfield:

Original Persian
بشنو از نی چون حکایت می‌کند
از جدایی‌ها شکایت می‌کند
کز نیستان تا مرا بُبْریدهاند
در نفیرم مرد و زن نالیده‌اند
سینه خواهم شرحه‌شرحه از فراق
تا بگویم شرح درد اشتیاق
هر کسی کو دور ماند از اصل خویش
باز جوید روزگار وصل خویش

Sanskrit translation
श्रूयतां वंशीगलाद्वंशीकथा
कथ्यमाना विप्रयोगाणां व्यथा।
वंशिकारण्याद्यतो मां लूनवान्
सर्वलोकः कण्ठतो मे दूनवान्।
तद्वियोगैश्छिन्नभिन्नं मन्मनः
स्याद्यथोद्वेगं ब्रवीत्वेतज्जनः।
येन केनापि स्वमूलाद्भ्रश्यते
तेन भूयो योगमार्गोऽन्विष्यते।

Hearken to the reed-flute, how it complains, lamenting its banishment from its home: "Ever since they tore me from my osier bed, my plaintive notes have moved men and women to tears. I burst my breast, striving to give vent to sighs, and to express the pangs of my yearning for my home. He who abides far away from his home is ever longing for the day he shall return."

A Sanskrit verse by Shukla:

सर्वाङ्गं मलयजगन्धवन्द्यमानं
किं भूयो निटिलतटे पटीरचर्चा।
संजाता मम धमनी ससूत्रजाला
संशीर्णा पुनरुपवीतसूत्रतः किम्॥

When all my limbs have the fragrance of sandalwood, why should I adorn my forehead alone with the tilaka? When all my nerves have become thin as threads, what is the need of the sacred thread?
