= Debi Prasanna Pattanayak =

Indian academic and linguist

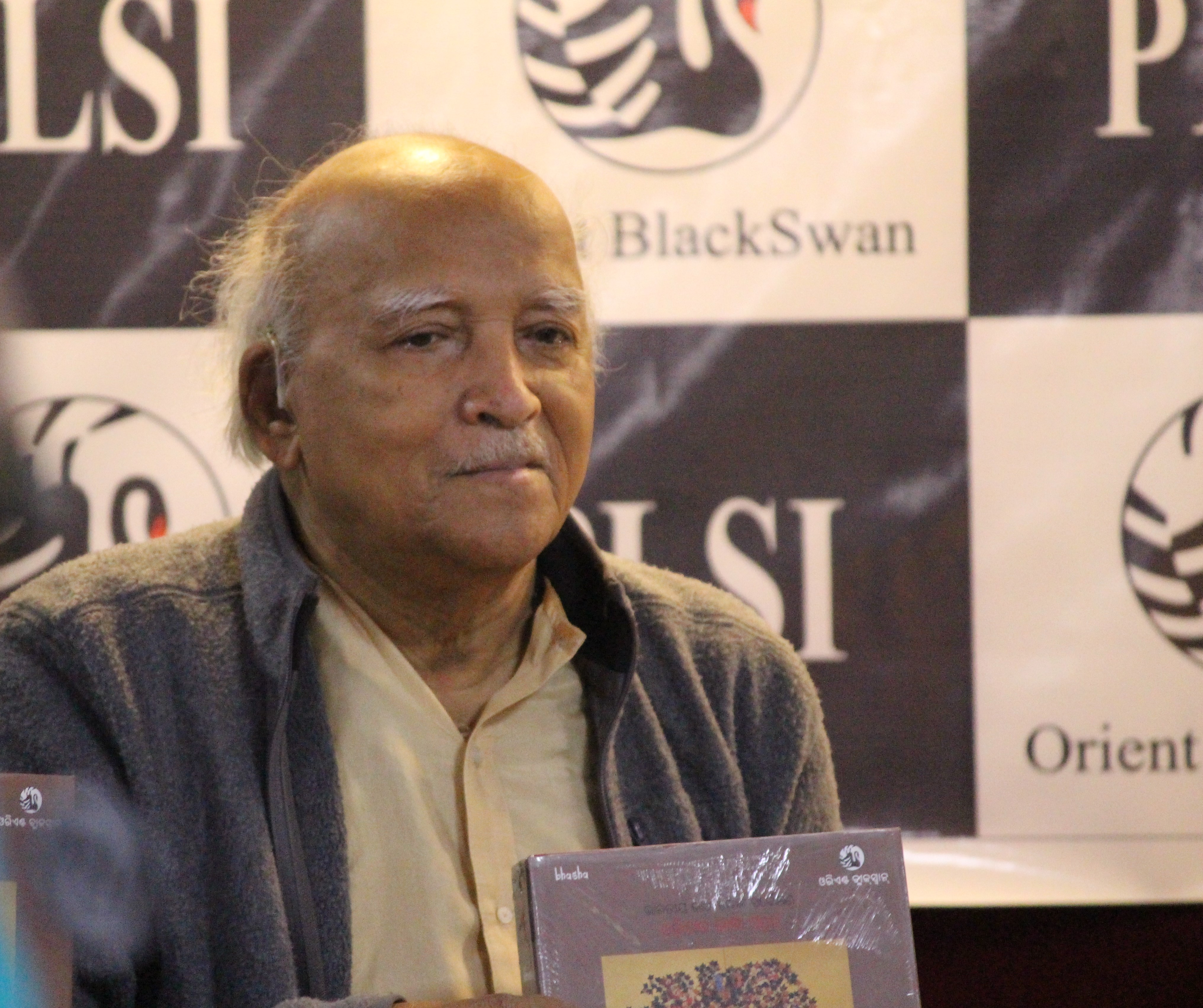
- Born: 14 March 1931 (age 95); Tigiria, Cuttack, Odisha
- Education: Cornell University, New York, Ravenshaw University, Cuttack
- Occupations: Professor, linguist, social scientist and author
- Organization(s): Central Institute of Indian Languages, Mysore
- Notable work: Adding Bodo language to the 8th schedule of the Constitution of India, classical language status for Odia
- Parent(s): Madhusudan Pattanayak, Minamali Debi
- Relatives: Akshaya Mohanty (brother-in-law)
- Awards: Padma Shri
- Pattanayak's voice Recorded January 2014

Debi Prasanna Pattanayak (born 14 March 1931) is an Indian professor, linguist, social scientist and author. He was the founder-director of the Central Institute of Indian Languages, Mysore and former chairman of Institute of Odia Studies and Research, Bhubaneswar. Pattanayak was awarded Padma Shri in 1987. for his contribution to formalize, and adding Bodo language in the 8th schedule of the Constitution of India. He also had a major role to play for Odia language to acquire the status of a "classical language".

Debi Prasanna Pattanayak delivering keynote speech at International Conclave for Odia language 2015, New Delhi

== Selected works ==
- Multilingualism in India
- Intensive Hindi course: drills
- Language and Social Issues: Princess Leelavathi Memorial Lectures
- Papers in Indian Sociolinguistics
- An Introduction to Tamil Script, Reading & Writing
- Multilingualism and mother-tongue education
- Language Policy and Programmes
- Advanced Tamil Reader, Part 1
- An Outline of Kumauni Grammar
- Language and Cultural Diversity: The Writings of Debi Prasanna Pattanayak, Volume 2
- Language, Education, and Culture
- A Controlled Historical Reconstruction of Oriya, Assamese, Bengali, and Hindi
- Conversational Oriya
- Orissa, Oriya and the Multilingual Context
- Multilingualism and Multiculturalism: Britain and India
- An Introduction Ti Tamil Script, Reading & Writing
- An Introduction to Tamil Script, Reading & Writing
- Rabīndra smaraṇīkā
- Kabilipi

== Honors ==
- Kalinga Sahitya Samman 2014
- Tigiria Samman 2011
- Padma Shri, 1987
- PhD (Ravenshaw University)
