= Kural Peedam Award =

Award for scholars of classical Tamil

The Kural Peedam Award (Tamil: குறள் பீடம் விருது) is a lifetime achievement presidential award given to eminent scholars of classical Tamil. The award was instituted in 2005 by the Central Institute of Classical Tamil under the aegis of the Ministry of Human Resource Development in India. Two awards are presented annually, one for a person of Indian origin and another for a scholar of non-Indian origin. The award includes of a cash prize of ₹0.5 million (just over US$8,000), a citation, and a shawl.

== Recipients ==
- Dr. George L. Hart (2005–2006)
- Dr. Jaroslav Vacek
- Dr. John Ralston Marr
- Professor Francois Gros (2008–2009)
- Dr. Eva Wilden

== See also ==
- Thiruvalluvar Award
