= Yogimatha rock painting =

Yogimatha
- ଯୋଗୀମଠ (Odia)
- Interactive map of Yogimatha
- 21°51.81′N 83°50.00′E
- Type: Hills
- Location: Risipith, Raigaon, Khariar, Nuapada, Odisha
- Nearest city: Khariar

Site notes
- Elevation: 946 feet (288 m)
- Governing body: Government of Odisha
- Owner: Used as a dwelling place of prehistoric men
- Website: https://nuapada.nic.in

Yogimath (Odia: [dʒoɡimɔʈʰɔ]) is situated in Nuapada district at a distance of about 9 km from Khariar western Odisha border area and 67 km from Bhawanipatna of Kalahandi District. This place is famous for its neolithic cave paintings. In Yogimath caves the paintings are drawn by red paint over rock surfaces. The most significant pictures are of a bull followed by cow, calf and a man indicating the domestication of animal by man and agriculture. The past glory of this place is still unexplored. Near Yogimath, there is a mountain named Risipiti which is well known for producing clear echoes.

== History ==
On the basis of art style, colour composition of the motifs, the paintings can be dated to the Mesolithic or Chalcolithic periods. The paintings at Gudahandi of Kalahandi may be placed about the 15th millennium B.C., but those at Yogimath are somewhat of later period and may be assigned to about the 10th millennium B.C. The paintings are largely disfigured by human vandalism and superimposition of ritualistic symbols such as the trident, swastika, and other Hindu symbols in a paste of vermillion and ghee.

The rock art shelter exhibits both monochrome and bi-chrome paintings of early historic period. It is the only reported rock art site of Nuapada district. The shelter preserves paintings in monochrome of dark red. The subject matter includes stick-like human figures, cattle (with or without hump), concentric circles, curvilinear circles, and shapes resembling dambaru (cattle drums).

== Study ==
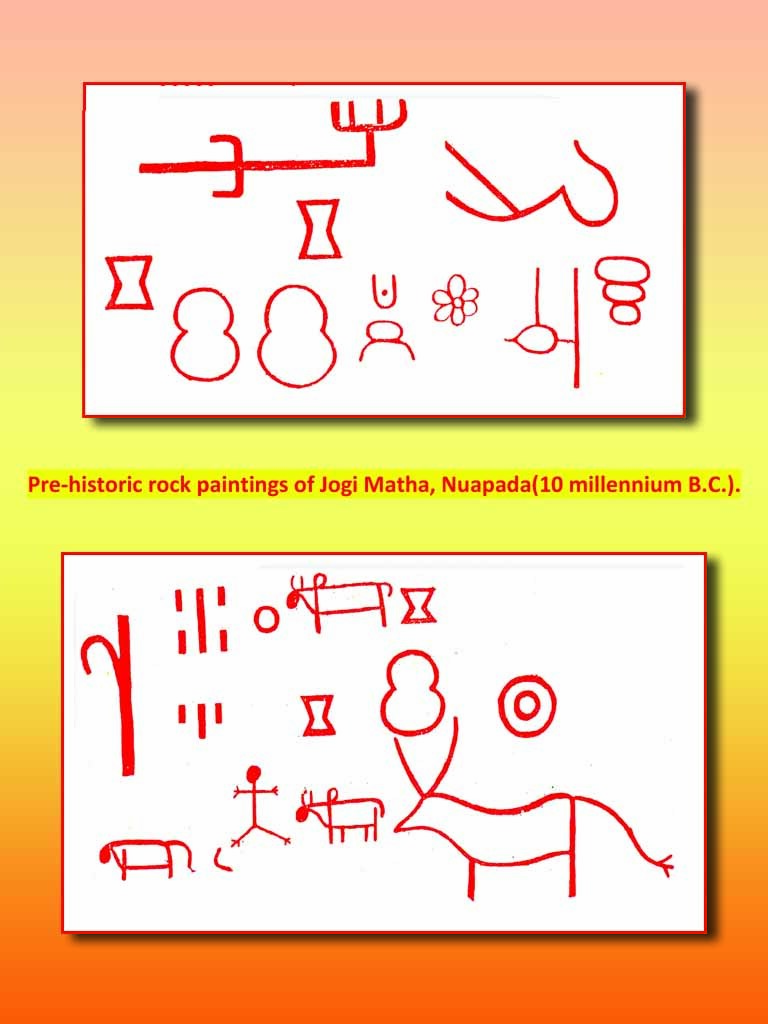
Yogimath Rock Art- Inscription, Odisha

The granite hillock Risipith preserves paintings from prehistoric times on an inclined surface of a boulder. The shelter was first reported by J.P Sing Deo in 1976. Dr. Subrat Kumar Prusty was the first person to read the Yogimatha rock painting of the Yogimatha which was in an old Indian script. The script ‘Ga’, and ‘o’ (tha) was discovered from the Yogimatha rock painting; this painting showed a person with four animals and with some alphabet. According to Prusty, that painting created a word like "Gaitha" (very popular Odia word at present ‘Gotha’ or ‘group’ in English). This art is closely related to this alphabet. This alphabet has similarity to Vikramkhol Cave Inscription, Dhauli and Jaugada Inscription's script of Ashok. He assumed that it was the ancient form of Indian script named Pre-Brahmi Script and it is the first glimpse of possible origin of the Odia language and script.
