= Orissa Official Language Act, 1954 =

Act recognizing Odia as an official language

Orissa Legislative Assembly
- Long title: An Act to confer upon the Orissa Government certain powers to ensure and encourage use of Odia in official correspondence.
- Citation: Act No. 14 of 1954
- Enacted by: Orissa Legislative Assembly

Amended by
- Act 18 of 1963 & Act 12 of 1985

The Orissa Official Language Act, 1954 (Act No. 14 of 1954) is an Act of Orissa Legislative Assembly that recognizes Odia "to be used for all or any of the official purposes of the State of Orissa (now Odisha).

== History ==
Article 345 of the Constitution of India empowers the Legislature of the State to adopt 'any one or more of the languages in use in the State or Hindi as the language or languages to be used for all or any of the official purposes' of the concerned State. But it provides for the continued use of English for the 'purposes within the state for which it was being used before the commencement of the Constitution', until the Legislature of the State otherwise provides by law. Orissa is the first state to be evolved on the basis of language. So The Orissa Official Language Act, 1954 was enacted in 1954.

== Development ==
Despite the enactment, the implementation has not been done in a mass scale for which people of Orissa have voiced to ensure the use of Odia language in all official correspondence. The hunger strike by activist Gajanana Mishra was a prominent step in this direction and was one such significant instance.

== Salient features ==
The Orissa Official Language Act, 1954 is the Orissa Act 14 of 1954 which received the assent of Governor on 1 October 1954 and was published in the Orissa Gazette on 15 October 1954.

=== Important Sections ===
==== Section 3A ====
This section has been inserted by the Amendment Act 1963 which states about Continuance of English language for use in Legislature:

"Notwithstanding the expiration of the period of fifteen years from the commencement of the Constitution of India, the English language may, as from the 26th day of January, 1965, continue to be used, in addition to Oriya for the transaction of business in Legislature of the State of Orissa".

— Amendment Act 1963

== Amendments ==
- The 1963 Orissa Official Language (Amendment) Bill makes provision for continuing use of English in addition to Odia for transaction of business in legislature of the state of Orissa.
- One new amendment was added to this act under Amendment Act 12 of 1985.
