= World Sanskrit Conference =

The World Sanskrit Conference is an international conference organized at various locations globally. It has been held in North America, Europe, Asia and Australia. The Delhi International Sanskrit Conference of 1972 is considered to be the first World Sanskrit Conference. So far it has been held in India four times (1972, 1981, 1997, 2012). The World Sanskrit Conferences are held under the aegis of the International Association of Sanskrit Studies.

== History ==
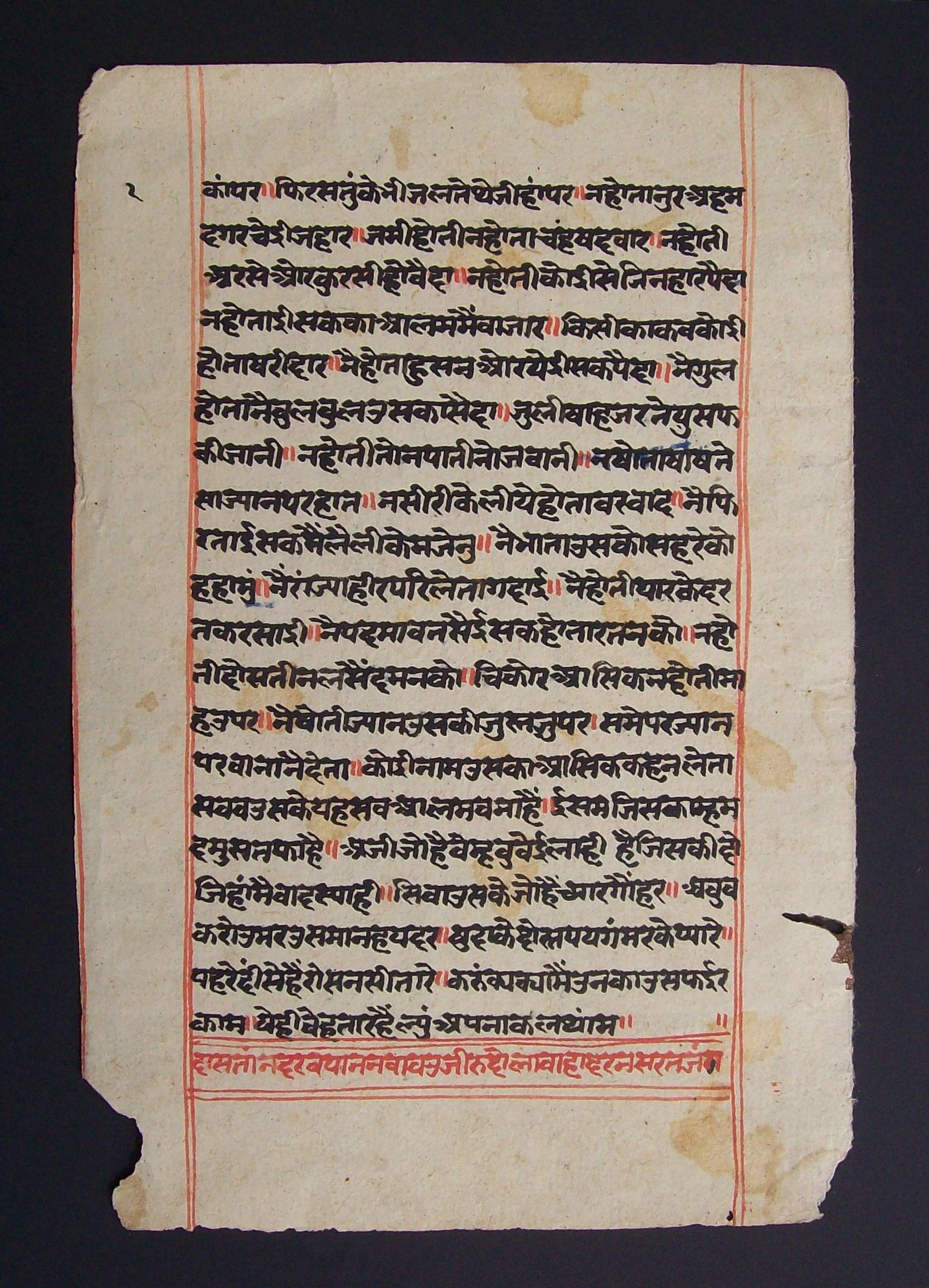
Ancient Sanskrit on Hemp based Paper. Hemp Fiber was commonly used in the production of paper from 200 BCE to the late 1800s.

According to the official web-site of the International Association of Sanskrit Studies (IASS), several Sanskrit scholars from major Indian universities perceived that the International Congress of Orientalists "did not allow sufficient scope for full discussion of Sanskrit and allied subjects". These scholars approached the Government of India, which arranged to convene the first International Sanskrit Conference at New Delhi in March 1972. The following year, at the 29th International Congress of Orientalists, Sanskrit scholars from around the world got together to form the IASS. The main responsibility of the IASS was to organise World Sanskrit Conferences at various places around the world. The 1972 New Delhi conference was retrospectively recognised as the "First World Sanskrit Conference".

The sixteenth conference in Bangkok, Thailand in 2015 received unprecedented support from the Indian government. In what some have called a "display of soft power", India sent a group of 250 Sanskrit scholars, led by External Affairs Minister Sushma Swaraj, who gave the inaugural address in Sanskrit. The conference was also supported by and held in honor of Maha Chakri Sirindhorn, Princess of Thailand, who has supported Sanskrit education, and had received a master's degree in Pali and Sanskrit from Chulalongkorn University.

The 2018 conference in Vancouver featured a session titled "The Story of Our Sanskrit," where two female Sanskritists presented and a third female Sanskritist moderated. The session was plagued by sexist and casteist comments from an unruly audience. In an email sent to the INDOLOGY listserv, the lead conference organizer, Dr. Adheesh Sathaye, publicly apologized for the "hooliganistic behaviour of some members of the audience."

== Conferences ==
The first World Sanskrit Conference was held in Vigyan Bhavan, New Delhi, India between 26–31 March 1972. Dr. Ranganathan was its chairman. Thereafter, conferences have been held as follows:

| Date | Location | Ref. |
|---|---|---|
| June 1975 | Turin, Italy | |
| 20–25 June 1977 | Paris, France | |
| 23–30 May 1979 | Weimar, West Germany | |
| 1981 | Varanasi, India | |
| 1984 | Philadelphia, United States | |
| 1987 | Leiden, Netherlands | |
| 27 August–2 September 1990 | Vienna, Austria | |
| January 1994 | Melbourne, Australia | |
| January 1997 | Bangalore, India | |
| April 2000 | Turin, Italy | |
| July 2003 | Helsinki, Finland | |
| July 2006 | Edinburgh, United Kingdom | |
| 1–6 September 2009 | Kyoto, Japan | |
| 5–10 January 2012 | New Delhi, India | |
| 28 June–2 July 2015 | Bangkok, Thailand | |
| 9–13 July 2018 | Vancouver, Canada | |
| 9–13 January 2023 | Canberra, Australia (online) | |
| 26-30 June 2025 | Kathmandu, Nepal | |

=== Future venues and dates ===
- The 20th conference is scheduled to be held in Mumbai, India, in December 2027.

== Proceedings ==
The proceedings of the WSC have been published as follows:

1. Delhi (1972) Conference were published in four volumes (vols I-III.1, Ministry of Education and SocialWelfare, New Delhi, 1975–80; vols III.2-IV, Rashtriya Sanskrit Sansthan, Delhi, 1981),
2. Weimar (1979) Conference in a volume entitled Sanskrit and World Culture (Akademie-Verlag, Berlin, 1986), those of the Varanasi Conference by the Rashtriya Sanskrit Sansthan, New Delhi, in 1985.
3. An IASS newsletter informs that the proceedings of the Leiden (1987) Conference in several volumes (Brill, Leiden, 1990–92); the Proceedings of the Helsinki (2003) and Edinburgh (2006) Conferences are in the process of publication by Motilal Banarsidass, New Delhi.
4. The Proceedings of the World Sanskrit Conferences held at Turin (1975), Paris (1977), Philadelphia (1984), Vienna (1990), Melbourne (1994), Bangalore (1997), Turin (2000), Kyoto (2009) have been published in Indologica Taurinensia, which is the official organ of the I.A.S.S.

== See also ==
- Sanskrit studies
