= International Association of Sanskrit Studies =

The International Association of Sanskrit Studies (IASS) is an organisation whose primary purpose is to arrange the World Sanskrit Conference, which is usually held once every three years. Membership is open to all.

The association was formed as a result of the 1972 International Sanskrit Conference that was sponsored by India's central government with collaboration from UNESCO.

Indologica Taurinensia is the journal of the IASS.
