= Institute of Odia Studies and Research =

Language research in Odisha, India

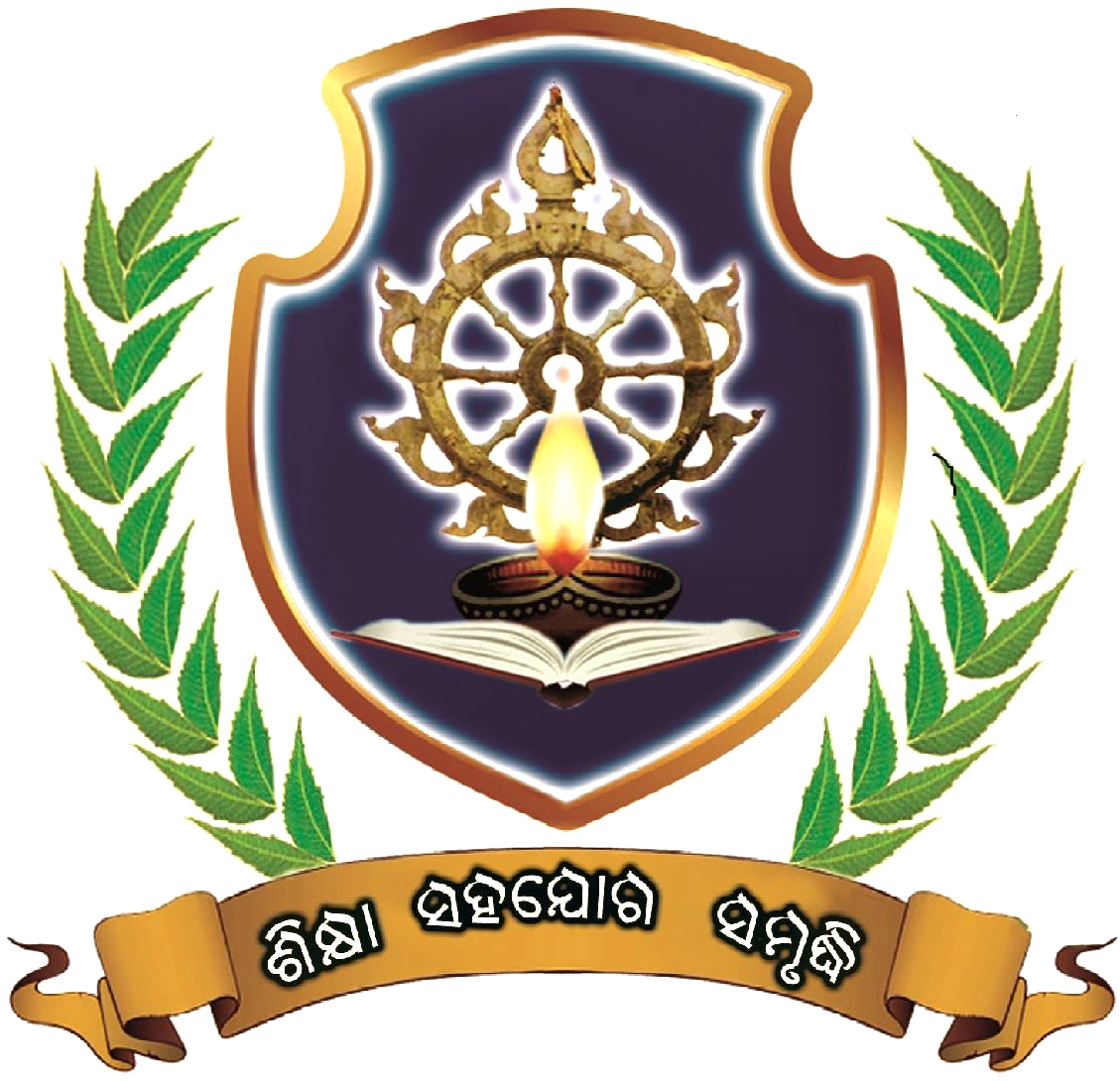
- Motto: Inform, Involve and Empower
- Type: Research Institute
- Established: November 2010; 16 years ago
- Chairman: Natabar Satpathy
- Director: Brajendra Prasad Das
- Location: 3 R 9, BJB Nagar, Bhubaneshwar, Odisha, 751014, India
- Language: English, Odia

Institute of Odia Studies & Research (IOSR) is a language research Institute. The mission of the institute is to develop Odia as a language of knowledge as well as of development. It is working for the establishment of a Central Institute Of Classical Odia as well as an Odia Biswabidyalaya. During the past ten years the institute has organised discussion groups, state and national level seminars and conference.

== Research work ==
IOSR has always been a priority to research for human development. In this regard, IOSR organising National level seminars and conferences before deciding on which research to be done, and seek the advice of experts. For the past 15 years, the institute has been conducting about 15 national level seminars and 7 national language conferences for this purpose.

=== Odia as a classical language ===
The first research project of the organization was based on the Odia language. In order to explore the ancient history and glory of the Odia language, IOSR developed a research paper for the classical recognition of the Odia language. The study breaks down the pre-existing idea that Odia is a 500-year-old language, with a 2,500-year history of the language, a 2,000-year-old literature, and a script that was created from primitive caves below 20,000 years old. The research paper proves that the origin of the script, especially in all the scripts of India, is derived from Odisha. According to the Central Government's Home Department, the Odia language has been given classical status, but after two years of research, it has given glory to the Odia language and the importance of the Odia language as an ancient and prosperous language in the world.

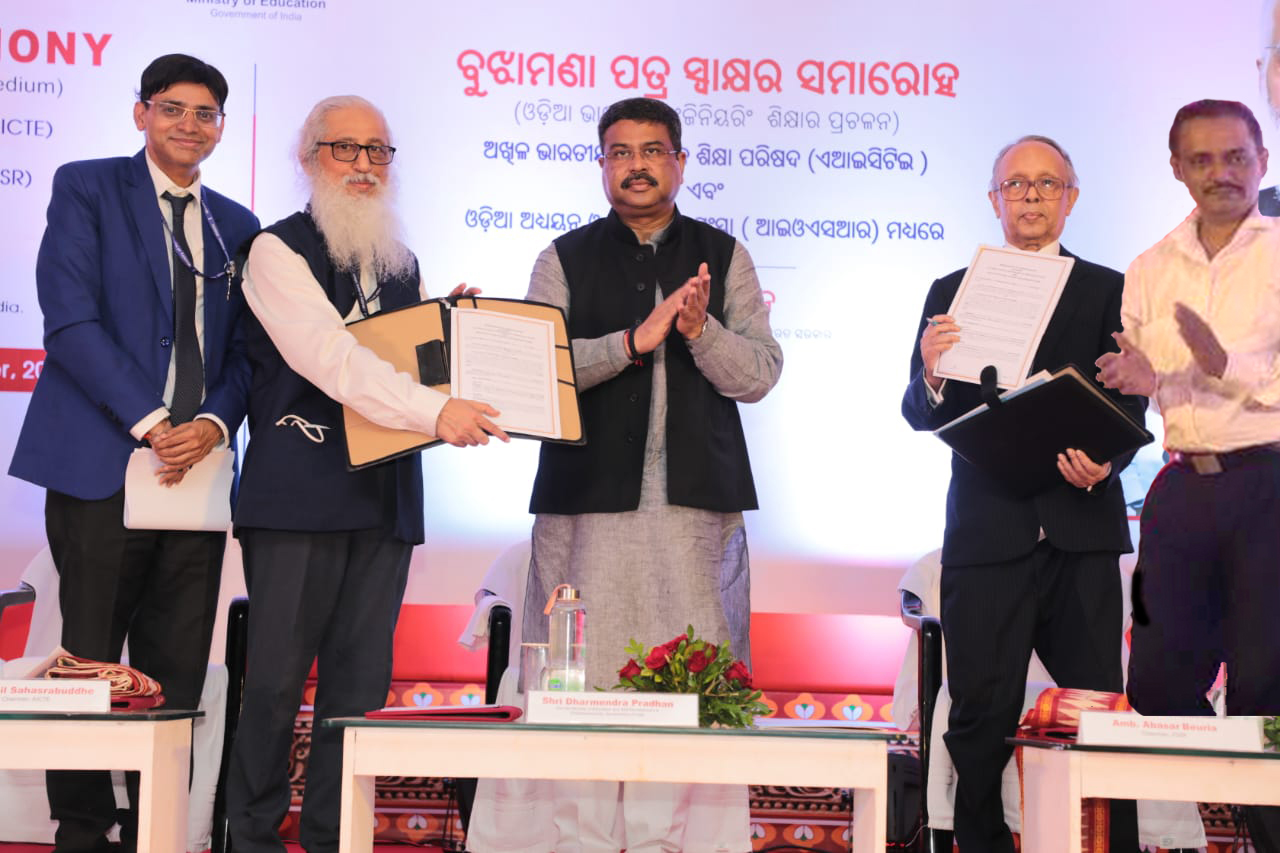
Institute of Odia Studies and Research signed an MOU with the All India Council for Technical Education (AICTE), Ministry of Education, Government of India for translation of technical books in Odia language

== Memorandum of understanding (MOU) ==
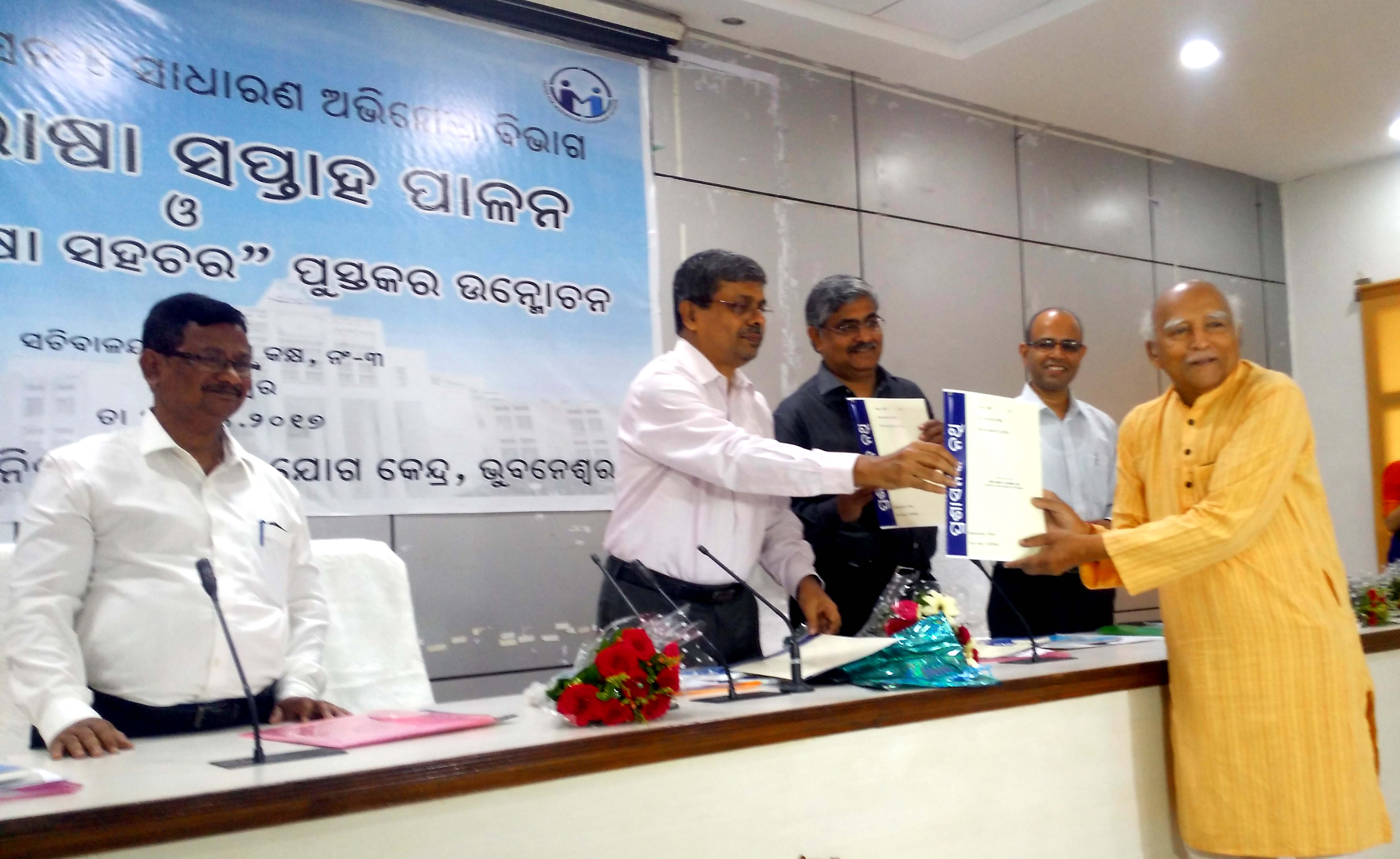
Odia Prasasanika Nathi For Odisha Officers

- IOSR signed a Memorandum of Understanding (MOU) on 20 March 2014 with the CMGI, GA Dept, Government of Odisha having usage of Odia language in the State administration. IOSR prepared and edited book named Sarakari Bhasa Sahacar and a Flyleaf (Nathi), which was written some important official Order of Notes in English and Odia.
- IOSR signed a MoU on 1 October 2014 with the Indira women Organisation for voluntary action (IWOVA), Odisha having joint endeavor in Research, Teaching, monitoring and Mobilizing women and organizing them on socio economic issues in all over Odisha.
- IOSR has signed a MoU on 15.03.2016 with the Utkal University, Bhubaneswar, under the joint endeavor in the field of computational linguistics and research.
- Institute of Odia Studies and Research (IOSR) signed a Memorandum of Understanding (MOU) on 18 October 2021 with The All India Council for Technical Education (AICTE), Ministry of Education, Government of India for translation of technical books in Odia language. The MoU was signed in presence of Union Education Minister Dharmendra Pradhan who in his address said the collaboration that will help in developing study materials for engineering education in Odia language is a major step towards ensuring education in mother tongue, one of the biggest recommendations of National Education Policy (NEP)-2020. Objective is to facilitate the preparation and introduction of technical-books in Odia at Degree and Diploma Level from the academic session of 2022 (primarily through translation of model texts-books in English language prepared / recommendedby AICTE).

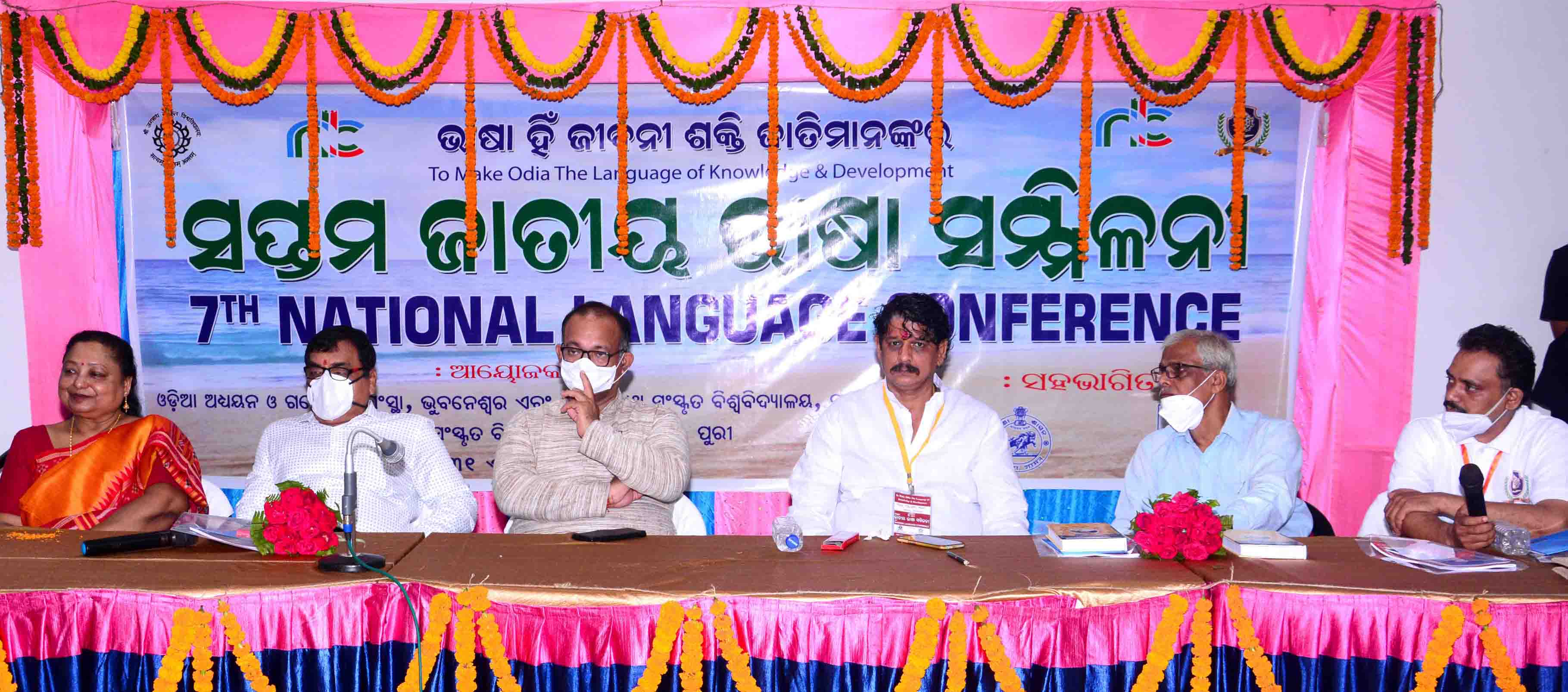
Inauguration session of the 7th National Language Conference-2021 at Puri, Odisha

== National language conference ==
The annual National Language Conference started after the recognition of Odia as a classical language organized by the Institute of Odia Studies and Research for two days on 2 and 3 January 2014 to prepare its next outline. The goal was to help create a platform to discuss language issues and support language movement in preserving the regional heritage and culture.

- 1st National Language Conference: Jayadev Bhawan, Bhubaneswar (2014)
- 2nd National Language Conference: Institute of Physics (2015)
- 3rd National Language Conference: Utkal University, OUAT & IIT, Bhubaneswar (2016)
- 4th National Language Conference: NIST, Berhampur (2017)
- 5th National Language Conference: Ravenshaw University, Cuttack (2019)
- 6th National Language Conference: Sambalpur University, Sambalpur (2020)
- 7th National Language Conference: SriJagannath Sanskrit University, Puri(2021).

== Publications ==
IOSR Published 6 no's of Research Books, 4 No's of NLC Proceedings and Half yearly Research Journal 'BHASA' regularly.

=== Research Books ===
- Kahibar Nohe se Kataka Chatakaku by Subrat Kumar Prusty (2018)
- Odia Bhasara Utpatti O kramabikasha by Subrat Kumar Prusty (2018)
- Sastriya Bhasa Odia by Subrat Kumar Prusty (2017)
- Bhasa Bimarsha by Natabar Satapathy (2018),
- Hindubad O Jagannath by Panchanan Kanungo (2018),
- Dara 370: janmasthanaru kabarsthan by Panchanan Kanungo (2020).

=== Proceedings ===
- "Language, Literature, Culture and Integrity" Vol I, ISBN 978-81-933604-0-8 (2016)
- "Language, Literature, Culture and Integrity" Vol II, ISBN 978-81-942780-0-9 (2019)
- "Language, Literature, Culture and Integrity" Vol III, ISBN 978-81-942780-5-4 (2020)
- "Language, Literature, Culture and Integrity" Vol IV, ISBN 978-81-942780-3-0 (2020)

=== Library ===
IOSR has opened first language library of Odisha with 5325 books, five daily and five monthly journals have been subscribed. Hon’ble Law & Panchayatiraj Minister Dr. Arun Kumar Sahu and Hon’ble Mass Education & Industry Minister Sj. Debi Prasad Mishra inaugurated the library at Bhubaneswar.
