= Bijepur =

- Town
- Location in Bargarh, Odisha, India Bijepur (India)
- Coordinates: 21.190°N 83.458°E
- Country: India
- State: Odisha
- District: Bargarh

Government
  - Type: N.A.C.
  - Body: Bijepur Notified Area Council
  - Member of Legislative Assembly: Shri. Sanat Kumar Gartia
- Elevation: 189 m (620 ft)

Population (2011)
  - Total: 11,827

Languages
  - Official: Odia
  - Local: Sambalpuri
- Time zone: UTC+5:30 (IST)
- PIN: 768032
- Vehicle registration: OD-17
- Website: www.bijepurnac.in

Bijepur is a block and a Notified Area Council (NAC) in Bargarh district of Odisha, India. It is one of the 147 Vidhan Sabha constituencies of Odisha.

== Geography ==
Bijepur sits at an average elevation of 189 m (620 ft) above sea level. It is situated in Padampur sub-division and about 26 km (16 mi) south-east of Bargarh town. The area is populated with 322 km^{2} (124 sq mi).

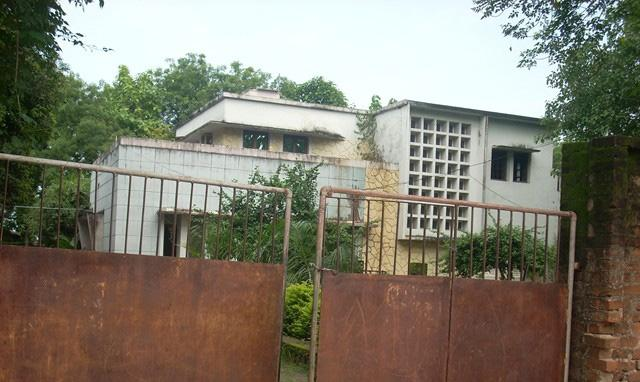
Bijepur zamidar

== Demographics ==
As of India census of 2011, Bijepur had a population of 11,827. Females constitute 50% of the population. Bijepur has an average literacy rate of 85.45%, more than the national average of 59.5%.

The local language of Bijepur is Sambalpuri (Kosali). The major communities of Bijepur are Kuiltas, Dumals Agharias, Bhulias/Mehers (the weavers), Brahmins etc. Kuiltas and Dumals are presumed to be an offshoot of the original Chasa (agrarian) community and are synonymous with the Khandayats of the coastal region. This is evident by the striking similarity of rituals and gods they worship. When Bhulias settled in this region is controversial. Agharias were migrated from the Mughal Empire for establishing a cultivator community during war when Kuiltas were assigned the duty of part-time Kshatriyas. Sambalpuri is the language for communication. Oriya and English are used for official purposes and for higher education.

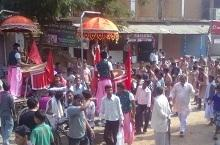
Kalas Yatra

== Economics ==
The economy of Bijepur is largely dependent on farming vegetables and sambalpuri saree. The daily market of Bijepur is claimed to be the largest vegetable market in this block. "Sambalpuri Sarees" originated from there. Ikkat Hand woven sarees and other Sambalpuri clothes are made in Bijepur.

== Education ==
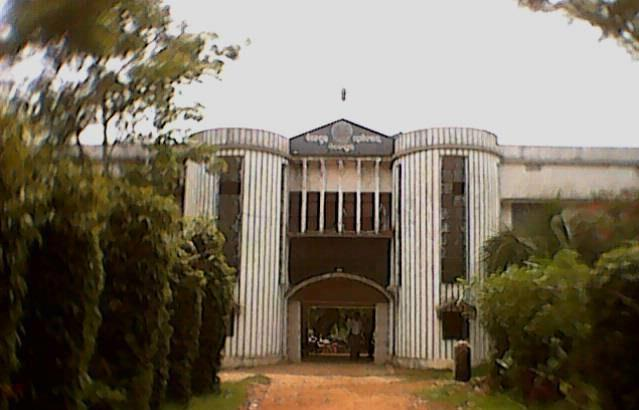
Bijepur College, Bijepur

Bijepur has an adequate number of schools and a reputed degree college. Along with this, there is also a school run by Anand Marg.
