= Samasingha =

- Village
- Interactive map of Samasingha
- Coordinates: 21.772284°N 84.180620°E
- Country: India
- State: Odisha
- District: Jharsuguda

Languages
  - Official: Odia
- Time zone: UTC+5:30 (IST)
- PIN: 768213
- Vehicle registration: OD 23
- Nearest city: Jharsuguda
- Lok Sabha constituency: Bargarh
- Avg. summer temperature: 45 °C (113 °F)
- Avg. winter temperature: 23 °C (73 °F)
- Website: odisha.gov.in

Samasingha is a gram panchayat in the district of Jharsuguda in the state of Odisha in India. The block office and police station of Samasingha is Kolabira, site of the Kolabira fort. It is divided into fourteen wards. The MLA constituency is Jharsuguda and the MP constituency is Bargarh. The village is situated on the bank of the Bhede river, a tributary of the Mahanadi. Two small seasonal streams flow through the village, the larger is named Badbahal and the smaller Nalia. Bhugarapali, Junadihi, Belmunda, Jalapara/Jaladihi and Kumharmal are villages are in the neighbourhood of Samasingha. Other nearby places include Jharsuguda, Sambalpur, Kuchinda, Bamra and Bagdihi. The nearest place of tourist attraction is Gudguda. It is on the route between Sambalpur and Ranchi.

National Highway 200 (Raipur-Chandikhole) runs along the periphery of the village. The population of the village is around 6000. The local wine is produced from rice and the flower of Madhuca indica. The mango and cashew nut trees spread throughout the village area.

The administrative hierarchy, from smallest to largest, is Samasingha (Post office, Gram Panchayat), Kolabira (Block or Panchayat Samiti and Tahsil), Jharsuguda (district), Odisha (State), India.

The nearest airport is in Jharsuguda, Bhubaneswar, Raipur. The nearest railway station is Jharsuguda.

== History ==
According to popular legend, the town's name is derived from the samarsing, or horn of a Samar, an animal. Historically, it was used as a gateway to the local kingdom, Haihay. When there was any invasion this samarsing horn to alert the security of the kingdom. The King's palace was situated on the bank of the Bheden river. A Shiva temple had been constructed at Mahadevpali by the king on the river bank. The king of Ratnapur (Surguja) attacked this kingdom over the marriage of the only daughter of the Haihay king. During this aggression the Haihay King was killed and his kingdom was destroyed. People say the 7 rani, the king's wives, committed suicide when the king was killed; a spot near the ancient palace on the Beden river is a tourist destination known as Rani Darah.

In the 16th century, Balram Dev, the first Chouhan king of Sambalpur, occupied this fort and there was a war between the Sambalpur king and the Ratnapur king, as a result of which the importance of the Bhogaragarh fort declined.

For a long time the Bhogaragarh fort and the surrounding temples remained abandoned. As a result, the temples near the fort decayed. A few years back, the villagers of Mahadevpali constructed a new temple at the original site. Local history is clearly linked with this temple, so it is considered to be one of the Astaswayambhus of Jharsuguda district. Every year, a fair takes place here on the day of Sivaratri.

== Flora and fauna ==
Domestic animals and birds include cattle, sheep, goats, chickens, ducks, parrots, champa and maina. Cultivated plants include tulsi, mango, guava, banana, rose, dahlia, chauldhua, kuiler, coconut, lichi, apple, Moringa oleifera and many others. Monkeys, rabbits and elephants are commonly found in the jungle. Local vegetation is composed of sishu, kendu, Madhuca indica, Azadirachta indica, Tamarindus indica, Ficus religiosa, Ficus bengalensis, kusam, jam, palm, saguan, harda, bahara, ananla, bel, char, krushnachuda, tut, kaha, kia, semel and a wide range of other plants.

== Economy, demographics and religion ==
The population of the village is Hindu. Most of the villagers are farmers and a significant number are teachers. Shops sell a wide variety of goods. A few people are also engaged in professions like IT, law enforcement, management, medicine, research and technical. The village produces surplus quantities of rice, potatoes, capsicum, mango, cashew nut, sugarcane, and other agricultural products. The village is divided into "pada". People from many castes (e.g. Agharia, Badhai, Bhuiyan, Brahman, Chamar, Ganda, Gauda, Ghansia, Gudia, Keunt, Kharra, Khujria, Kuilta, Kumhar, Luhura, Mali, Sunari, Sundhi, Teli) live in the village.

== Local secular and religious institutions ==
There are a number of schools, from the elementary up to the college level, such as the Basumati Science College. There are also branches of the State Bank of India and post office and an Ayurveda Hospital, and veterinary offices. Prabhu Jagannath Temple, Maa Durga Temple, and Lord Shiva Temple are the places of worship found in the village. Various festivals are organized throughout the year but Makar Yatra organised on 26 and 27th of January is widely famous.

== Sports ==
Once the village football team was well-known in this area and they were victorious in a number of local tournaments. With the rise of cricket, the people started playing cricket. Every year on the occasion of Makar Yatra, a cricket tournament was held from 21 January to 25 January. Champa fighting is a yearly tournament organized by the villagers on 28 January (mostly). Kabbadi, Khokho, Gillidanda, luklukani are some of the other sporting events played by the villagers during leisure time.

== Tourist places nearby ==
- Gudguda (Kuchinda)
- Shiva Shrine of Mahadebpali (Samasingha, Sudhamal, Laida)
- Historical Kolabira Fort
- Ranidarah (Samasingha)
- Shiv Temple (Kankmal)
- Rock Painting and Lithography of Bikramkhol

The village of Banjari lies about 25 km from Jharsuguda on the Jharsuguda-Lakhanpur road. The ancient cave of Bikramkhol is located near this village, where a group of people lived starting around 4000 BC.

There are ancient script carvings in the wall of the Bikramkhol cave and also paintings of animals. Circular holes have been dug in the wall from which weapons, dress and other useful household items were suspended. There are also circular holes on the floor where grains were pounded. Bikramkhol has been declared a tourist spot by the Central Government and tourists, historians and researchers from all over the country and abroad.

=== Ruins of Hill Forts of Ulapgarh ===
On the Jharsuguda-Belpahar Road 21 km from Jharsuguda lies the village Lajkura. In the vicinity there is a hill known as "Maheswar Pahad" where the remains of an old holy fort attracts the attention of historians, researchers and tourists.

At the foot of Maheswar Pahad, there is a village named "Ulap". The ruins of Ulapgarh are located about one kilometre from the village. Here, the Maheswar pahad is about 1,000 feet (300 m) high and on the top there is a huge plain, where the fort of Ulapgarh stands. The plain is about 400 metres long and 250 metres wide. On the eastern side of the fort there are several kilometres of densely forested Baramunda Hills and on the western side, the Belpahar Railway Station is located at a distance of 5 km. On the north there is a dense forest stretching up to Hemgir and in the south stretching up to the village of Badjob.

A moat, 4 metres wide and 150 metres long, runs east to west. There was a Sivalingam and a place of worship in the Fort. A well dug within the Fort provided drinking water to the residents of the Fort throughout the year.

On the stone floor, there are many square and round holes, with diameters varying from 1-3 inches. Wooden poles used to be inserted into these holes to support super structures for living space, storage, arsenals, kitchen, sleeping areas and so on.

About 1000 people could take shelter at Ulapgarh at a time. On the western side of Ulapgarh and down the slope there is a cave named Ushakothi. On the walls and floors of this cave there are also circular and square holes, which the defence personnel of the fort may have used to suspend their clothes and other belongings from wooden poles fitted to these holes. The soldiers of the dense forest of Maheswar hill could easily overpower the enemies before they could climb up the hill and attack the fort.

It is believed that Ulapgarh was being used as a residential fort by kings of the Naja Dynasty. Indian and foreign researchers and historians are researching in this direction.

=== Padmasini Temple of Padampur ===
The Hirakud reservoir lies 60 km from Jharsuguda, near Bhikampali. There was once a town called "Padampur" located where the Mahanadi river leaves Madhya Pradesh and enters Orissa to pour into the Hirakud reservoir. The Sanskrit dramatist "Bhabahbhoti" was believed to be born here. The Bajrajan Tantraof Buddhism may have originated here.

Padmasini is the reigning goddess of this town. The Padmasini temple was constructed in the seventh century A.D. by a Chalukya king; the original temple decayed and was believed to be reconstructed by the Chouhan king of Sambalpur in the 16th century. The Jagmohan of original temple reveals a striking resemblance to architecture of the Chalukya era.

Even the stone statue of the goddess Padmasini bears striking similarities to the style of the Chalukya period. In the whole of Orissa, this Padmasini Temple is a unique example of Chalukya art and architecture. In 1956, Padampur was submerged in Hirakud reservoir, but the deity was shifted to a new temple at nearby Pujaripali. It is uncertain who made the original statue of Padmasini, although it is probably also seventh century in origin.

=== Ramchandi: An ancient Shaktipitha ===
This important place of ‘Shakti Worship’ is 10 km. away from Jharsuguda town inside a cave. Rampur Dandapat (Jamindari) was created during the reigning ‘Chhatrasai Dev’ the 7th King of Sambalpur (1657–1695). One Khytriya youth of Rajpotana belonging to Gaharwal family ‘Prannath Singh’ with his valour subdued the local aborigines of Rampur area in IB basin and received Rampur area as Jagirdari from Chhatrasai Dev, the ruling king of Sambalpur. The Rampur Jamindari had an area of 786 sq. miles. Davi Ramchandi has been worshipped as the reigning deity of the Rampur region since time immemorial. Many pilgrims and devotees come to the Rampur cave from far and near to worship the goddess Ramchandi.

=== Koilighugar Waterfall ===
The Koilighugar water fall is situated 55 km away from Jharsuguda in the Lakhanpur block near the village Kushmelbahal. A rivulet named ‘Ahiraj’ originates in the ‘Chhuikhanch’ forest and while flowing through its rocky belt falls from a height of 200 feet (61 m) creating the water fall of Koilighugar. After the fall the rivulet flows westwards to merge into the Mahanadi river.

Inside the fall there is a Shivalingam known as ‘Maheswarnath’. The lingam is submerged in water and not ordinarily visible. If somebody tries to see it from inside the water in winter and summer the lingum is visible under the reflected sunlight, hence for the benefit of the pilgrims another Sivalingam has been created outside the waterfall. There is an Ashram of a holy man, or Saham swami near the water fall. Every year a fair sits in Kalighugar on the occasion of Maha Sivaratri.

=== Ancient Siva Shrine of Jhadeswar Temple, Jharsuguda ===
The Jhadeswar temple is located at a distance of about 1 km. from the Jharsuguda Railway station beyond the old town Purunabasti inside a small forest. There is a Swayambhu Sivalingam here the actual age of which is unknown; during the reign of Govind Singh Jamindar of Jharsuguda the lingam was worshipped inside a hut made of leaves. In 1916, a Gujarati contractor named Mulju Jagmal erected a small temple here. The Jamindar of Jharsuguda arranged Savayats for daily worship and donated agricultural lands for maintenance of the temple and puja. The temple was renovated in 1969 by a philanthropist from Calcutta, Lt. Surajmal Mohota. Since 1916 a fair takes place here on every Sivaratri day. The Jhadeswar temple area has important significance in the history of Jharsuguda. On the eastern side of the temple the original ‘Jharguda’ settlement has grown. On its northern side there was a settlement of ‘Gond subject’ of the Jamindar of Jharsuguda. Jhadeswar temple is recognised as original Siva shrine. ‘Adyaswambhu pitha’ of Jharsuguda. A small garden has been grown near the Jhadeswar temple which is used as a picnic spot.

=== Shree Pahadeswar Temple, Jharsuguda ===
It is situated at the top of a small hill on the eastern side of Jharsuguda and is another place of attraction in the District. The temple was constructed by a Gujarati Contractor Lt. Bitthal Bhai Saha in 1921. With its natural surroundings and because its accessibility, it attracts a lot of visitors. From the hill top a bird’s eye view of Jharsuguda town enthrals the visitors.

== Representative ==
- Sarapanch: Mr. Karunakar seth
- Member of Legislative Assembly: Dipali Das ([ Biju janta dal][BJD])
- Member of Parliament: Suresh Pujari (BJP)
