= Odia diaspora =

ପ୍ରବାସୀ ଓଡ଼ିଆ Prabāsi Odiā

Regions with significant populations
- Myanmar: 20,000 (2021)
- United States: 5676 (2021)
- Bangladesh: 4000
- Canada: 3235 (2021)
- Australia: 1401 (2021)
- New Zealand: 165 (2023)

Languages
- Odia

Religion
- Predominantly: Hinduism; Minorities: Christianity; Islam; Buddhism; Jainism and others

Related ethnic groups
- Indo-Aryan people, Bonaz people

Odia diaspora are people of Odia ancestry residing outside the Indian state of Odisha.

== Odias in Indian states outside Odisha ==
Migration from Odisha has a long history. Odia merchants had historical trade links with other parts of India. In modern times, Odias started migrating to different parts of India mainly for education, business and jobs.

There are various social and cultural organizations in various parts of the country which include Pravasi Odia Vikas Samiti (POVS), Odia Cultural Association which is a group of Odias in Delhi (based in Haryana), the Odia Association Of Delhi (which owns the Jagannath Temple) and Odia Mahasangram. There is an Odia association at Varanasi, Uttar Pradesh named as Varanaseya Utkal Samaj having long history of more than six decades of existence which is instrumental in bringing together the Odia people and culture within and beyond the Odia community living around the holy city of Varanasi.

The NRO community has honoured Jyoti Kullu, captain of India women's national field hockey team in 2007, on her achievement of the Arjuna Award. The Delhi Odia Lawyer Association awarded the Trophy. She was honoured in a brief function held at the residence of Mr.Jual Oram M.P. and National Vice President of BJP at Delhi. Oram and his wife Jhingia Oram garlanded Jyoti and congratulated her for her success in the field of sports.

== Geographic distribution ==
Although the total Odia population is unclear, 2001 Census of India puts the population of Odisha at around 36 million. There are smaller Odia communities in the neighbouring states of West Bengal, Jharkhand and Chhattisgarh. Most Odias in West Bengal live in the districts of Midnapore and Bankura. Surat in Gujarat also has a large Odia population, primarily diamond workers in the southern district of Ganjam. Bengaluru and Hyderabad have sizable Odia population due to an IT boom in late 2000s. Some Odias have migrated to Bangladesh where they are known as Bonaz community.

While the southern part of the state has inter migration within the country, the northern part of the state has migration towards the Middle East and the Western world. Balasore and cuttack are known as immigration centers of Odisha. Most of the Odia population abroad originates predominantly from the northern district of Balasore followed by Cuttack and Bhadrak. The migrants who work within the country predominantly originate from Ganjam and Puri districts.

While most Australian Odias prior to 1980 came from Balasore, Sambalpur and Cuttack, increased demand for software engineers and adoption have brought Odias from other areas.

Migration to the United Kingdom has been recorded since 1935, where mostly people from Balasore in undivided Bengal province went to work to United Kingdom and thereafter continuing a chain migration very predominant then, and continues to this day. Most British Odias have obtained British citizenship.

In the late 2000s many Odias, predominantly from Balasore and Cuttack, went to Europe to study and to work. This resulted in chain migration, predominantly from Balasore and Cuttack.

During 2009 construction boom in Saudi Arabia, the UAE and Qatar, Odias predominantly from Balasore, Bhadrak and Cuttack migrated to the area to earn high salaries in the IT and construction sectors.

== International organizations ==
There are various Odia organizations serving the diaspora in Canada, the United Kingdom, Republic of Ireland, the United States, Singapore and other countries such as: The Odisha Society of Canada, Odisha Society of United Kingdom (OSUK), Odia Society of Ireland (OSI), the Odisha Society of the Americas (OSA) the Norway Odia Community and the Odia Society Of Singapore (OSS).

Other organizations safeguarding Odia culture abroad include the Shri Jagannath Temple Trust, Canada.

Beside these country-level organizations, there has been attempts to unite all the NROs residing abroad to connect via various online communities. Pravasi Odia is one such online community. Additionally, the virtual Global Odia Mahotsav 2020 event took place in co-operation with multiple Odia organizations, with the aim of advancing international co-operation and development in Odisha.

=== Non-Resident Odia Facilitation Center ===
The Non Resident Odia Facilitation Center is an organization that works in liaison with the Government Of Odisha. The Society takes the form of a Public-Private-People-Partnership and shall have representation of the government, Non-Resident Odias (henceforth called NROs) and Community. The "Society" shall take the form of a Public-Private-People-Partnership and shall have representation of the government, NROs and Community.

== Notable people ==
- Bhanumati Devi - Odia film and theater actress born in Burma
- Manjusri Misra - Canadian professor, engineer and scientist
- Amar K. Mohanty - Canadian material scientist, engineer, academic and author
- Bibhu Mohapatra - American fashion designer
- Jogesh Pati - American theoretical physicist
- Ashok Das - American physicist
- Bhakta B. Rath - American material physicist
- Prasanta Pattanaik - American economist
- Prasant Mohapatra - American computer scientist
- Bhubaneswar Mishra - American computer scientist
- Jyoti Mishra- British Musician
- Saraju Mohanty - American scientist, author and computer engineer
- Gita Mehta - American writer and documentary filmmaker
- Ellora Patnaik - Canadian actress
- Lisa Mishra - American singer and actress
- Ritwik Behera - American cricketer
- Anshuman Rath - Hong Kong cricketer
- Anil Dash - American technology executive and entrepreneur
- P. K. Mahanandia - Swedish artist
- Ashok Swain - Swedish academic
- Dr. Swarup Ranjan Mishra - Founder of Mediheal hospitals, Kenya and former MP of Kesses in Kenya
- Sam Pasupalak - Canadian AI entreprenuer and co-founder of Maluuba

== See also ==
- Bonaz, Odia Bangladeshis
- Jagannath Temple (Puri)
- Jagannath Temple, Delhi
- Jagannath Temple, Hyderabad
- Shri Jagannath Puri Temple
- The Odisha Society of the Americas
- Odisha Society Of United Kingdom
