= Dumol =

Dumol may refer to:

- Paul Dumol, Philippine playwright and educator
- George Jamell (known as George Dumol in French), fictional character from the television series Mona the Vampire

== See also ==
- Dumal, a castle
- Dumont (disambiguation)
