= Odia people =

Indo-Aryan ethnolinguistic group

Odias
ଓଡ଼ିଆ ଲୋକ Odiā Lōka
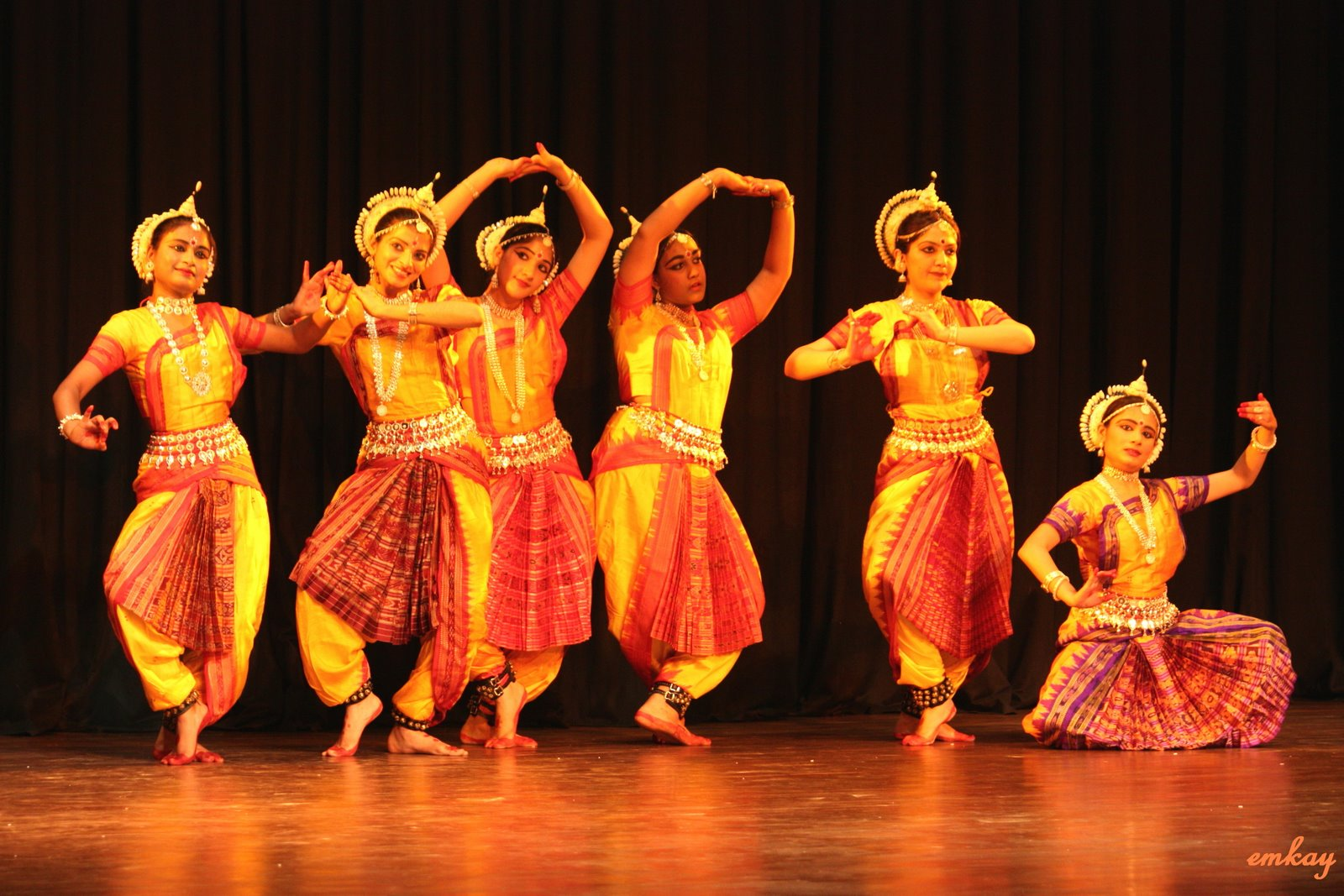
- Dancers performing odissi

Total population
- 40 million

Regions with significant populations
- India: 38,033,000 (2011)

Languages
- Odia

Religion
- Predominantly: Hinduism; Minorities: Christianity; Islam; Jainism; Buddhism and others

Related ethnic groups
- Indo-Aryan peoples

ଓଡ଼ିଆ Odiā
- Person: Odiā
- People: Odiā Lōka
- Language: Odiā
- Country: Odisha; Kalinga (hist.)

The Odia (ଓଡ଼ିଆ), formerly spelled Oriya, are an Indo-Aryan ethno-linguistic group native to the Indian state of Odisha who speak the Odia language. They constitute a majority in the eastern coastal state, with significant minority populations existing in the neighboring states of Andhra Pradesh, Chhattisgarh, Jharkhand and West Bengal. Odia is the 9th most spoken language in India. Modern-day Odisha was made from the Odia-speaking part of then–Bihar and Orissa Province, Odia-speaking areas of Madras Presidency, Odia-speaking areas of Central Provinces and Berar and Odia-speaking Gadajats (Odia Princely states). The first linguistic movement started in 1886 and with the successful efforts of Madhusudan Das, the Father of Odia nationalism, Odisha became the first state to be created on a linguistic basis.

== History ==
Ancient period

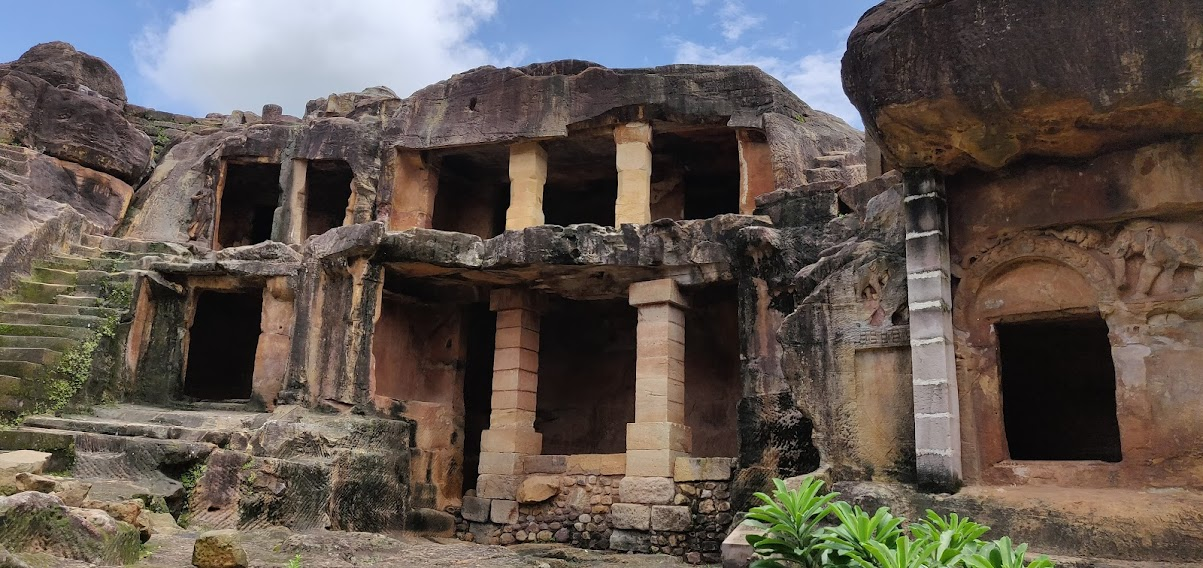
Udaygiri and Khandagiri Cave - 1

According to political scientist Sudama Misra, the Kalinga janapada originally comprised the area covered by the Puri and Ganjam districts.

According to some scriptures (Mahabharata and some Puranas), a king Bali, the Vairocana and the son of Sutapa, had no sons. So, he requested the sage, Dirghatamas, to bless him with sons. The sage is said to have begotten five sons through his wife, the queen Sudesna. The princes were named Anga, Vanga, Kalinga, Sumha and Pundra. The princes later founded kingdoms named after themselves. The prince Vanga founded Vanga kingdom, in the current day region of Bangladesh and part of West Bengal. The prince Kalinga founded the kingdom of Kalinga, in the current day region of coastal Odisha, including the North Sircars.

The Mahabharata also mentions Kalinga several more times. Srutayudha, the king of Kalinga, son of Varuna and river Parnasa, had joined the Kaurava camp in the Kurukshetra War. He had been given a divine mace by his father on request of his mother, which protected him as long as he wielded it. But, Varuna had warned his son, that using it on a non-combatant will cause the death of the wielder himself. In the frenzy of battle, harried by Arjuna's arrows, he made the mistake of launching it at Krishna, Arjuna's charioteer, who was unarmed. The mace bounced off Krishna and killed Srutayudha. The archer who killed Krishna, Jara Savara, and Ekalavya are said to have belonged to the Sabar people of Odisha.

In the Buddhist text, Mahagovinda Suttanta, Kalinga and its ruler, Sattabhu, have been mentioned.

In the 6th century sutrakara (chronicler), Baudhayana, mentions Kalinga as not yet being influenced by Vedic traditions. He also warns his people from visiting Kalinga (among other kingdoms), saying one who visits it must perform penance.

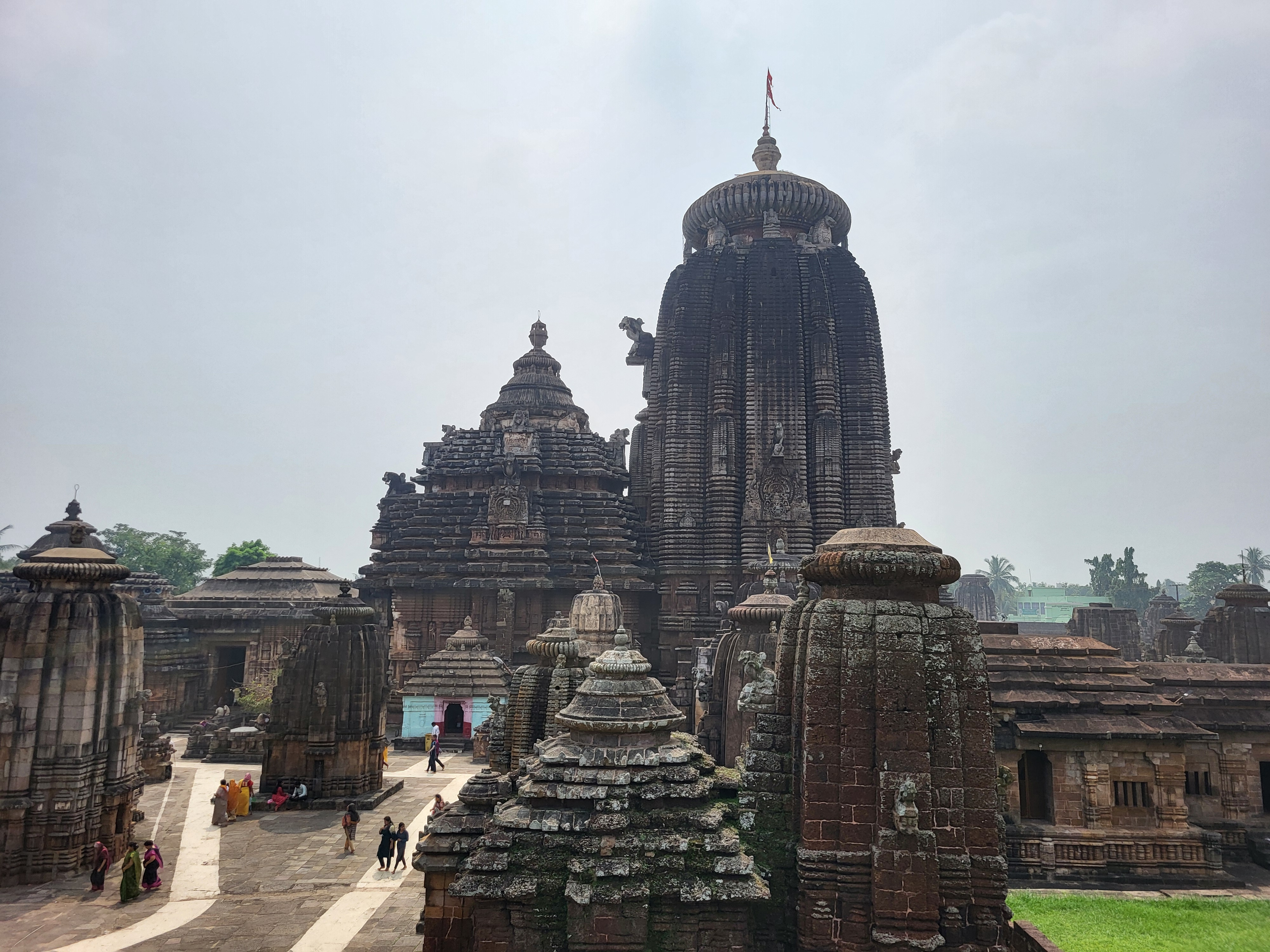
Lingaraj Temple, Bhubaneswar.

=== Medieval period ===
The Shailodbhava dynasty ruled the region from the sixth to the eighth century. They built the Parashurameshvara Temple in the 7th century, which is the oldest known temple in Bhubaneswar. They ruled Odisha from the 8th to the 10th century. They built several Buddhist monasteries and temples, including Lalitgiri, Udayagiri and Baitala Deula. The Keshari dynasty ruled from the 9th to the 12th century. The Lingaraj Temple, Mukteshvara Temple and Rajarani Temple in Bhubaneswar were constructed during the Bhauma-Kara dynasty. They were introduced as a new style of architecture in Odisha, and the dynasty's rule shifted from Buddhism to Brahmanism.

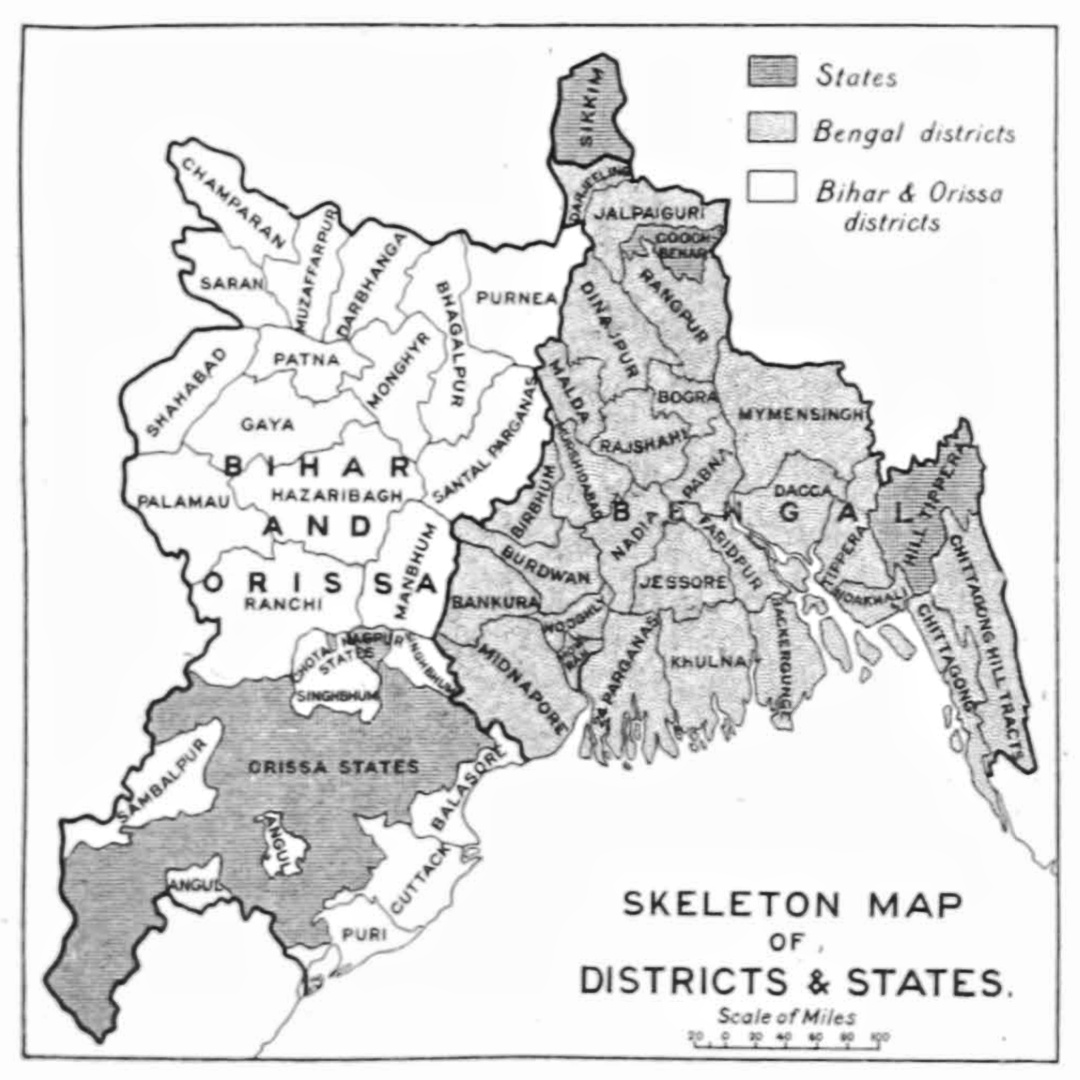
Undivided Odisha and Bihar states.

=== Modern period ===
Odisha remained an independent regional power until the early 16th century. It was conquered by the Mughals under Akbar in 1568 and was thereafter subject to a succession of Mughal and Maratha rule before coming under British control in 1803.

In 1817, a combination of high taxes, administrative malpractice by the zamindars and dissatisfaction with the new land laws led to a revolt against Company rule breaking out, which many Odias participated in. The rebels were led by General Jagabandhu Bidyadhara Mohapatra Bhramarbara Raya.

Under Maratha control, major Odia regions were transferred to the rulers of Bengal that resulted in successive decline of the language over the course of time in vast regions that stretched until today's Midnapore district of West Bengal.

Odisha became a separate province and the first officially recognized language-based state of India in 1936, after the amalgamation of the Odia regions from Bihar and Orissa Province, Madras Presidency and Chhattisgarh Division was successfully executed. 26 Odia princely states, including Sadheikala-Kharasuan in today's Jharkhand, also signed a merger with the newly formed state, while many major Odia-speaking areas were left out due to political lobby from other states.

== Communities ==
The Odia people are subdivided into several communities such as the Utkala Brahmin, Karan, Khandayat, Kayasth, Gopal, Kumuti, Chasa, Dumal, Bania, Bhulia, Kansari, Kuilta, Gudia, Patara, Tanti, Teli, Badhei, Kamara, Barika, Mali, Kumbhar, Sundhi, Keuta, Dhoba, Bauri, Kandara, Domba, Pano, Hadi. etc.

== Culture ==
Religion

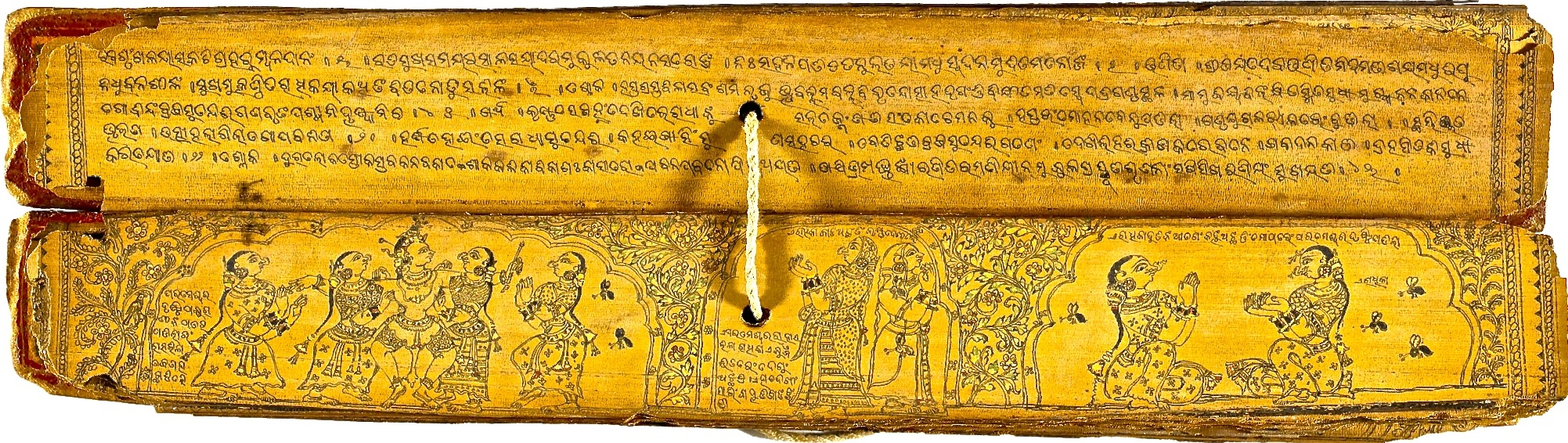
gita govinda manuscript

In its long history, Odisha has had a continuous tradition of dharmic religions especially Hinduism, Buddhism and Jainism. Ashoka's conquest of Kalinga (India) made Buddhism a principal religion in the state which led to the establishment of numerous Stupas and non religion learning centres. During Kharavela's reign Jainism found prominence. However, by the middle of the 9th century CE there was a revival of Hinduism as attested by numerous temples such as Mukteshwara, Lingaraja, Jagannath and Konark, which were erected starting from the late 7th century CE. Part of the revival in Hinduism was due to Adi Shankaracharya who proclaimed Puri to be one of the four holiest places or Char Dham for Hinduism. Odisha has, therefore, a syncretic mixture of the three dharmic religions as attested by the fact that the Jagannath Temple in Puri is considered to be holy by Hindus, Buddhists and Jains.

Presently, the majority of people in the state of Odisha are Hindus. As per the census of 2001, Odisha is the third largest Hindu-populated state (as a percentage of population) in India. However, while Odisha is predominantly Hindu it is not monolithic. There is a rich cultural heritage in the state owing to the Hindu faith. For example, Odisha is home to several Hindu saints. Sant Bhima Bhoi was a leader of the Mahima sect movement, Sarala Dasa, was the translator of the epic Mahabharata in Odia, Chaitanya Dasa was a Buddhistic-Vaishnava and writer of the Nirguna Mahatmya, Jayadeva was the author of the Gita Govinda and is recognized by the Sikhs as one of their most important bhagats. Swami Laxmananda Saraswati is a modern-day Hindu saint of Adivasi heritage.

There is also a small but significant community of Odia Muslims, who are mostly descendants of indigenous converts and migrants from northern and eastern India. With a population of roughly 1 million, Muslims in Odisha live significantly in Jajapur and Bhadrak districts. Majority of Muslims are Sunnis, followed by Shias which also include Khoja and Dawoodi Bohras. Historically, Sufi mysticism and traditions have significantly influenced Odisha's cultural and spiritual heritage.

=== Architecture ===
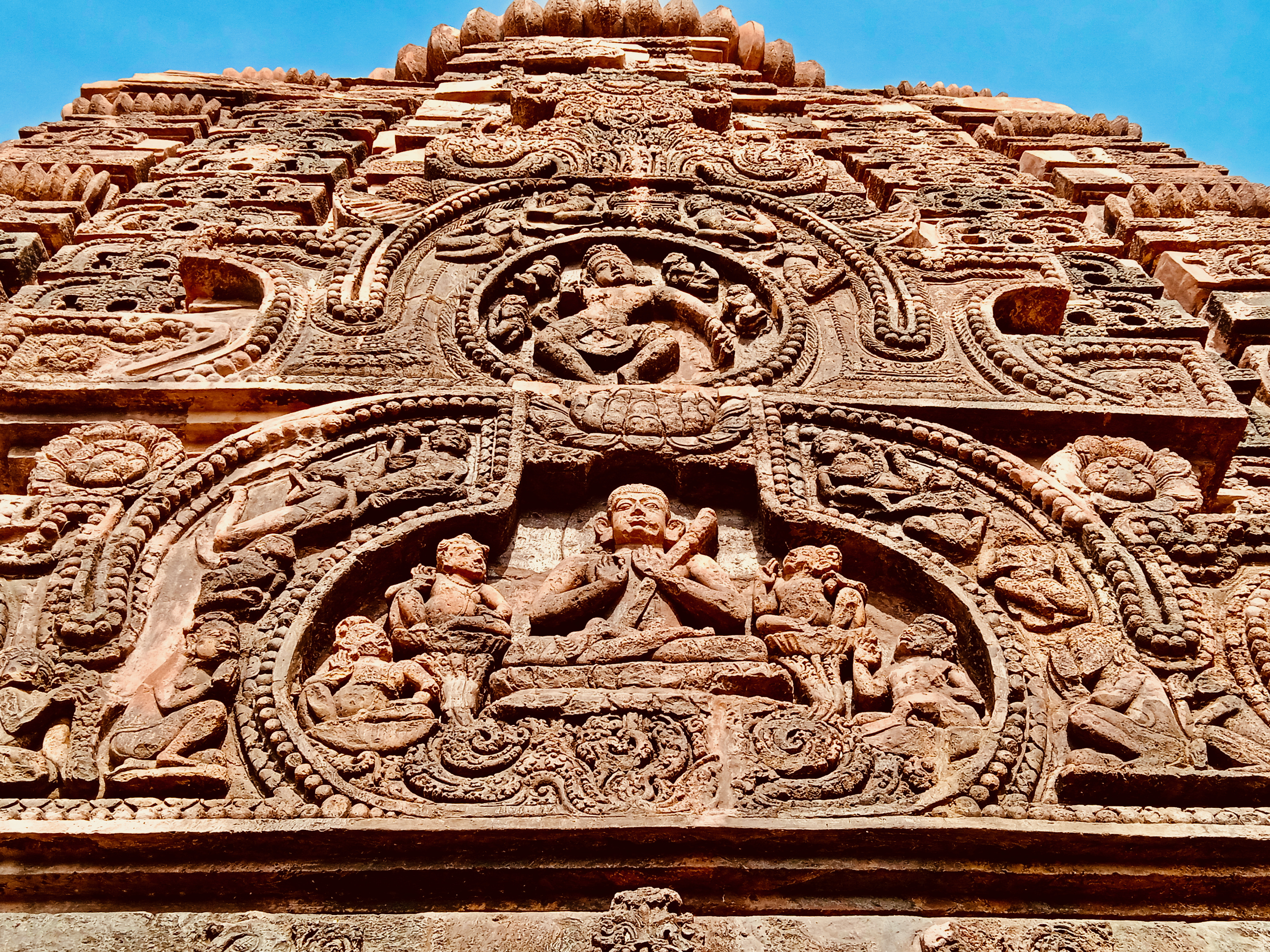
700 CE Mukhalingeswara Temples Group, Kalinga architecture, Mukhalingam, Andhra Pradesh - 111

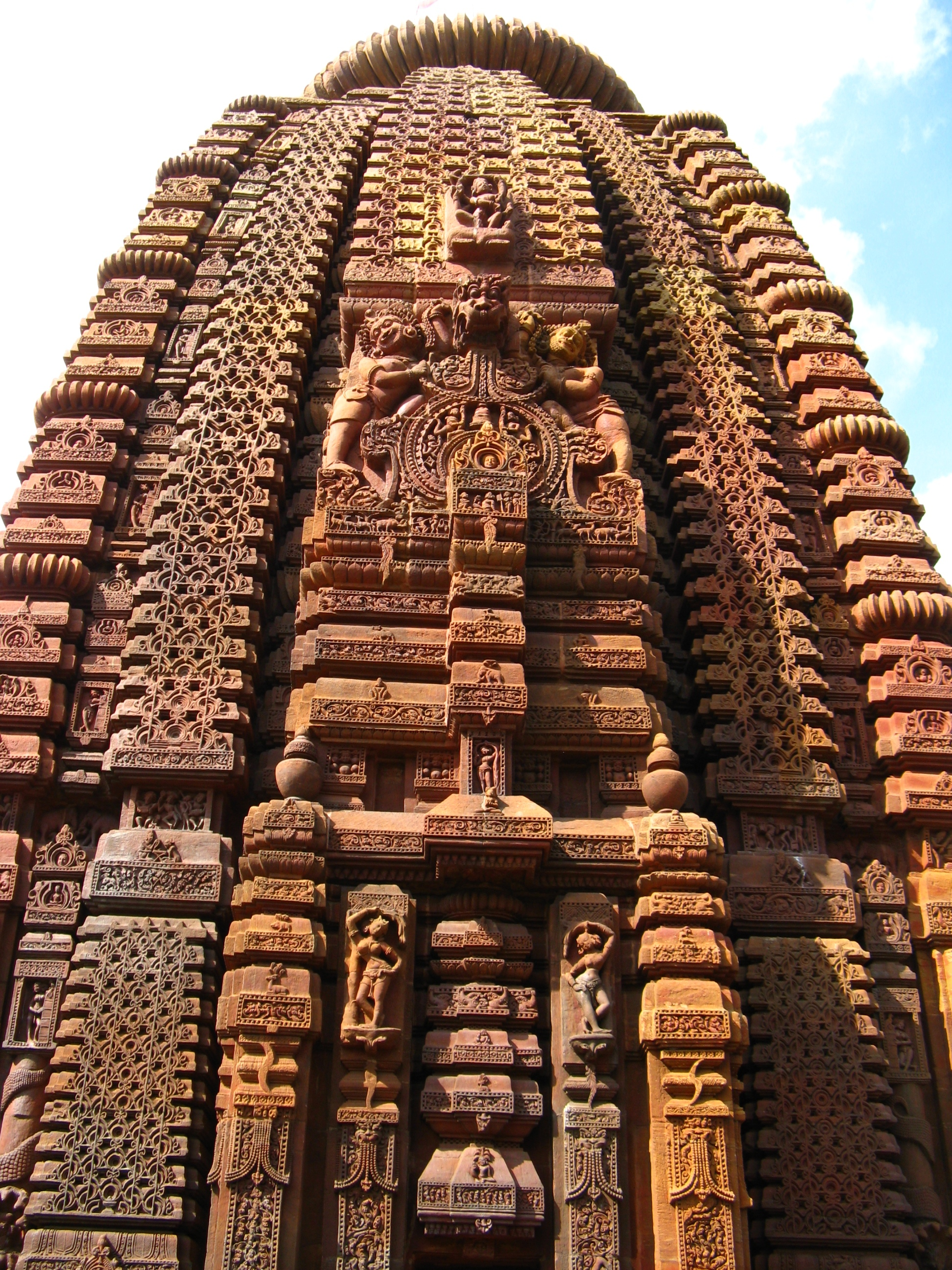
Mukteswar Temple (Kalinga Architecture)

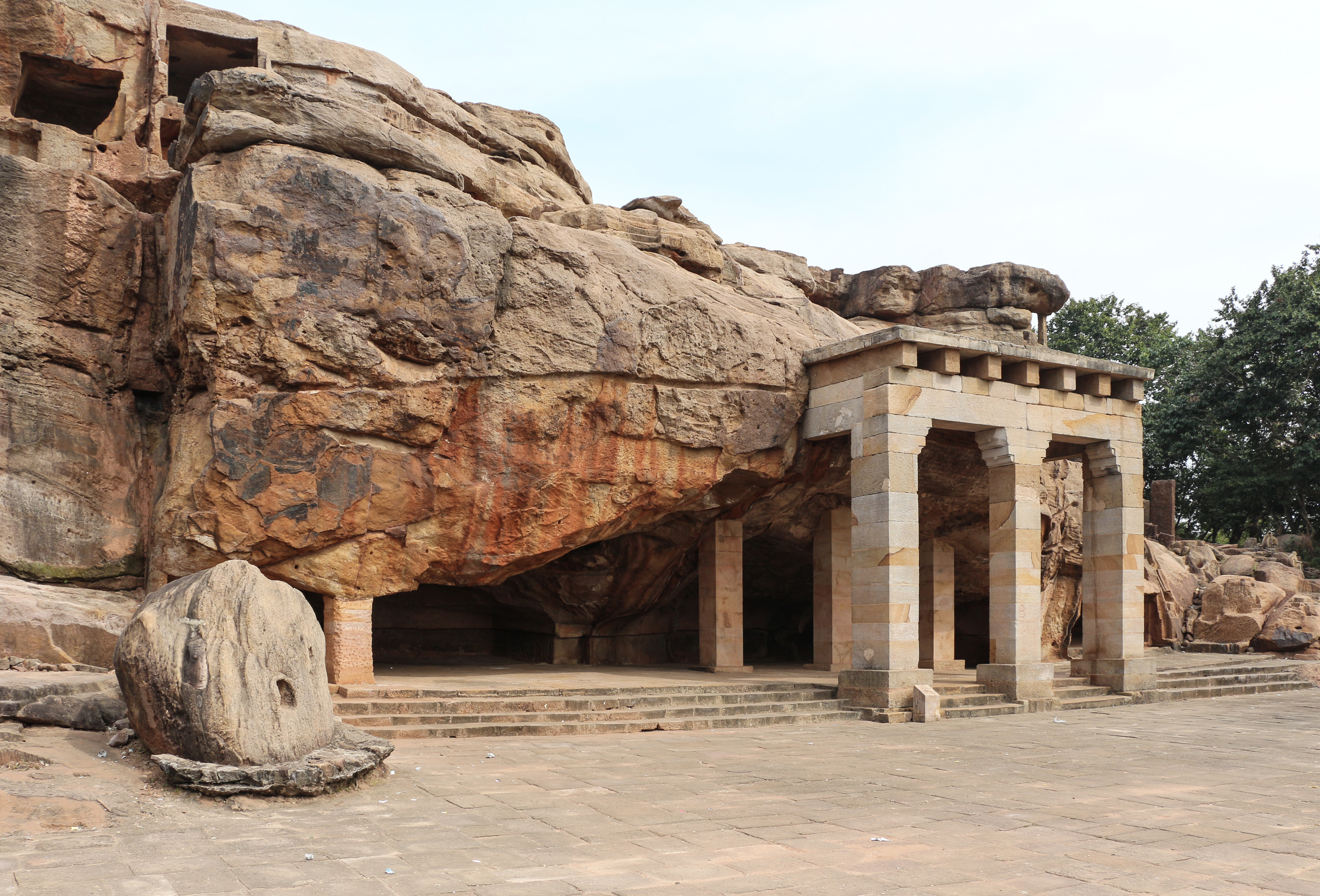
Udayagiri Caves - Hathi Gumpha

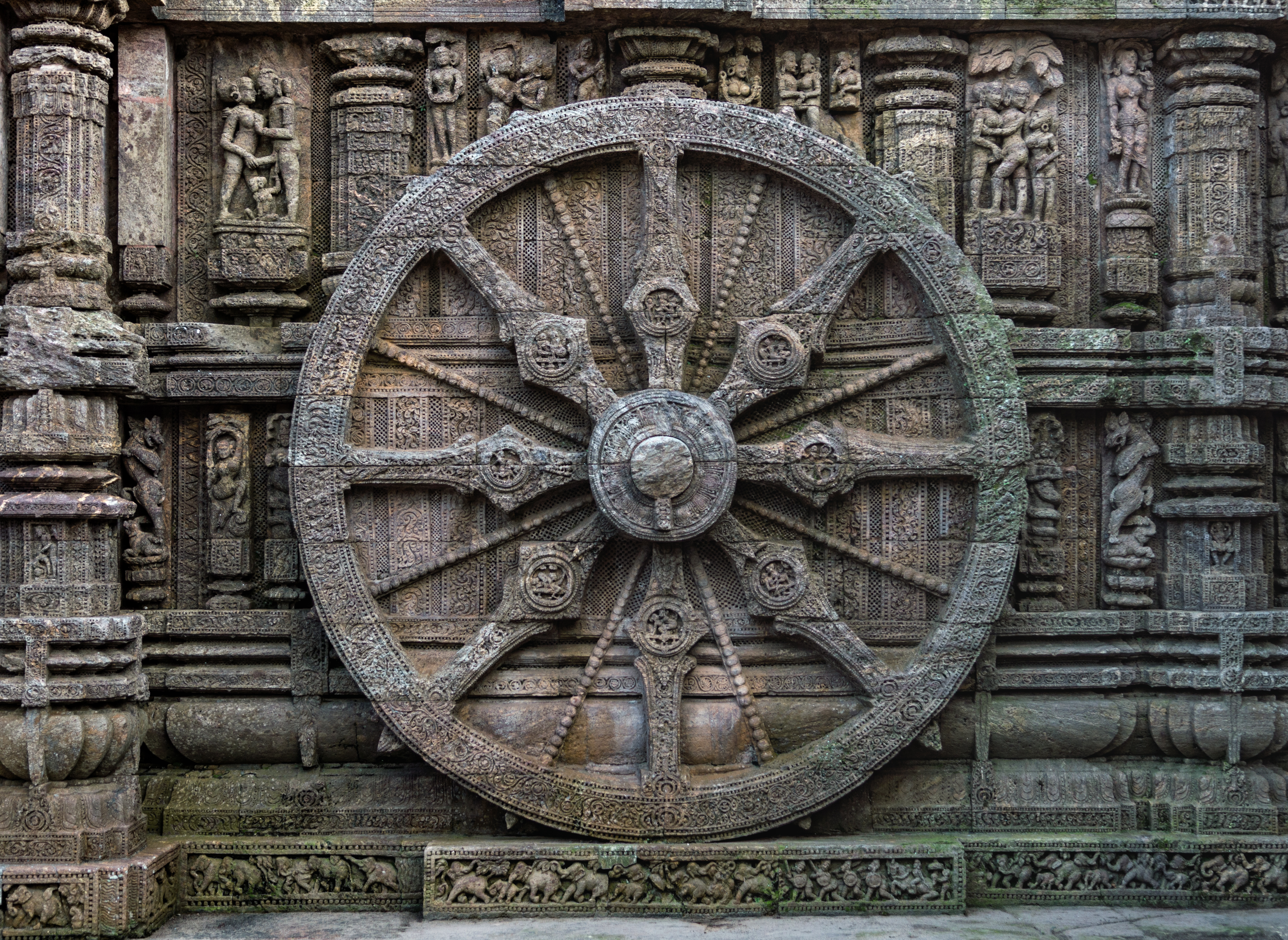
Stone wheel engraved in the 13th century built Konark Sun Temple in Orissa, India

The Kaḷinga architectural style is a style of Hindu architecture which flourished in the ancient Kalinga previously known as Utkal and in present eastern Indian state of Odisha. The style consists of three distinct types of temples: Rekha Deula, Pidha Deula and Khakhara Deula. The former two are associated with Vishnu, Surya and Shiva temples while the third is mainly with Chamunda and Durga temples. The Rekha Deula and Khakhara Deula houses are the sanctum sanctorum while the Pidha Deula constitutes outer dancing and offering halls.

=== Cuisine ===
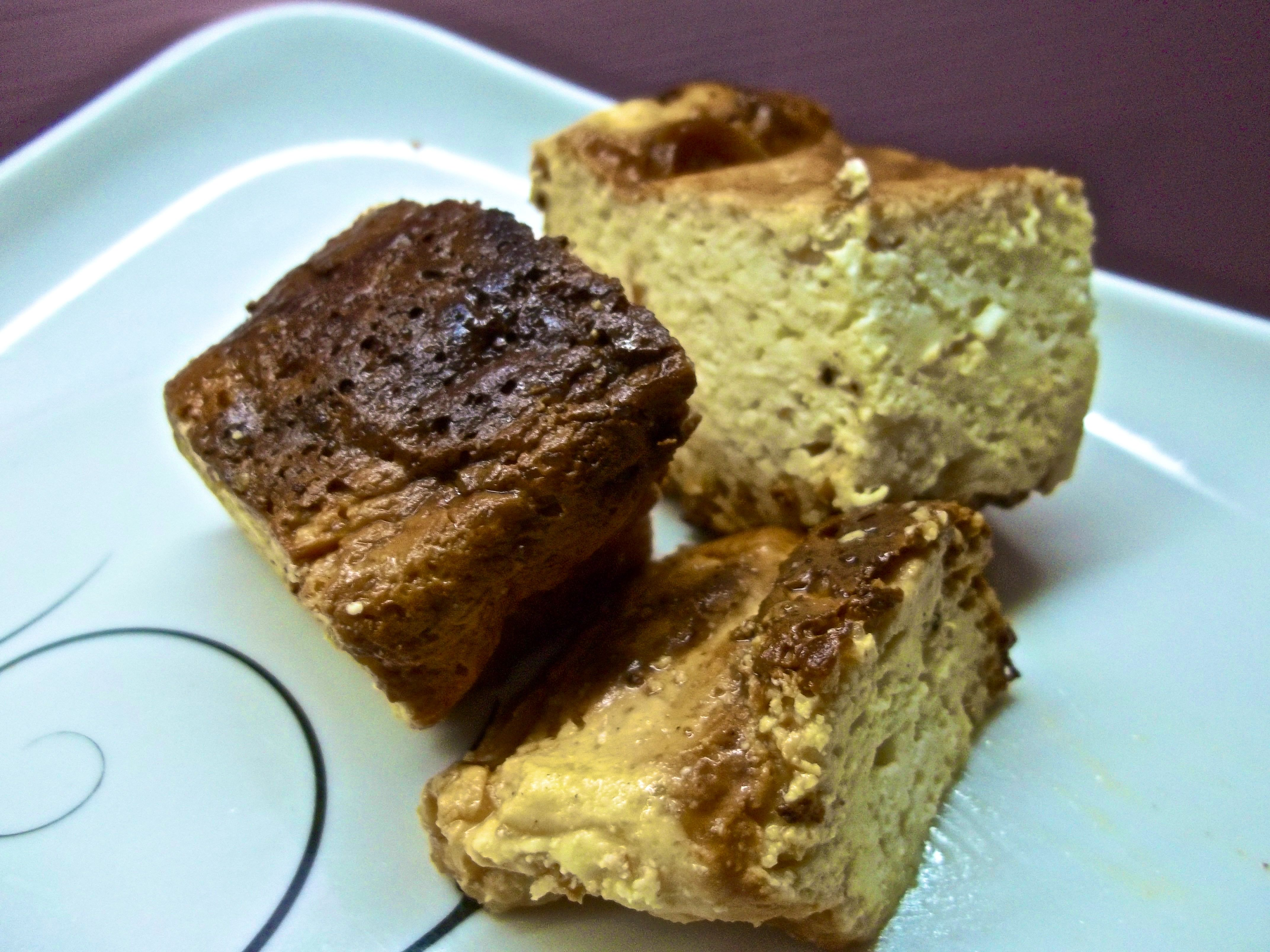
Chena poda a sweet delicacy from Odisha.

Seafood and sweets dominate Odia cuisine. Rice is the staple cereal and is eaten throughout the day. Popular Odia dishes are rasagolla, rasabali, chhena poda, chhena kheeri, chhena jalebi, chenna jhilli, chhenagaja, khira sagara, dalma, tanka torani and pakhala.

=== Festivals ===
Ratha yatra

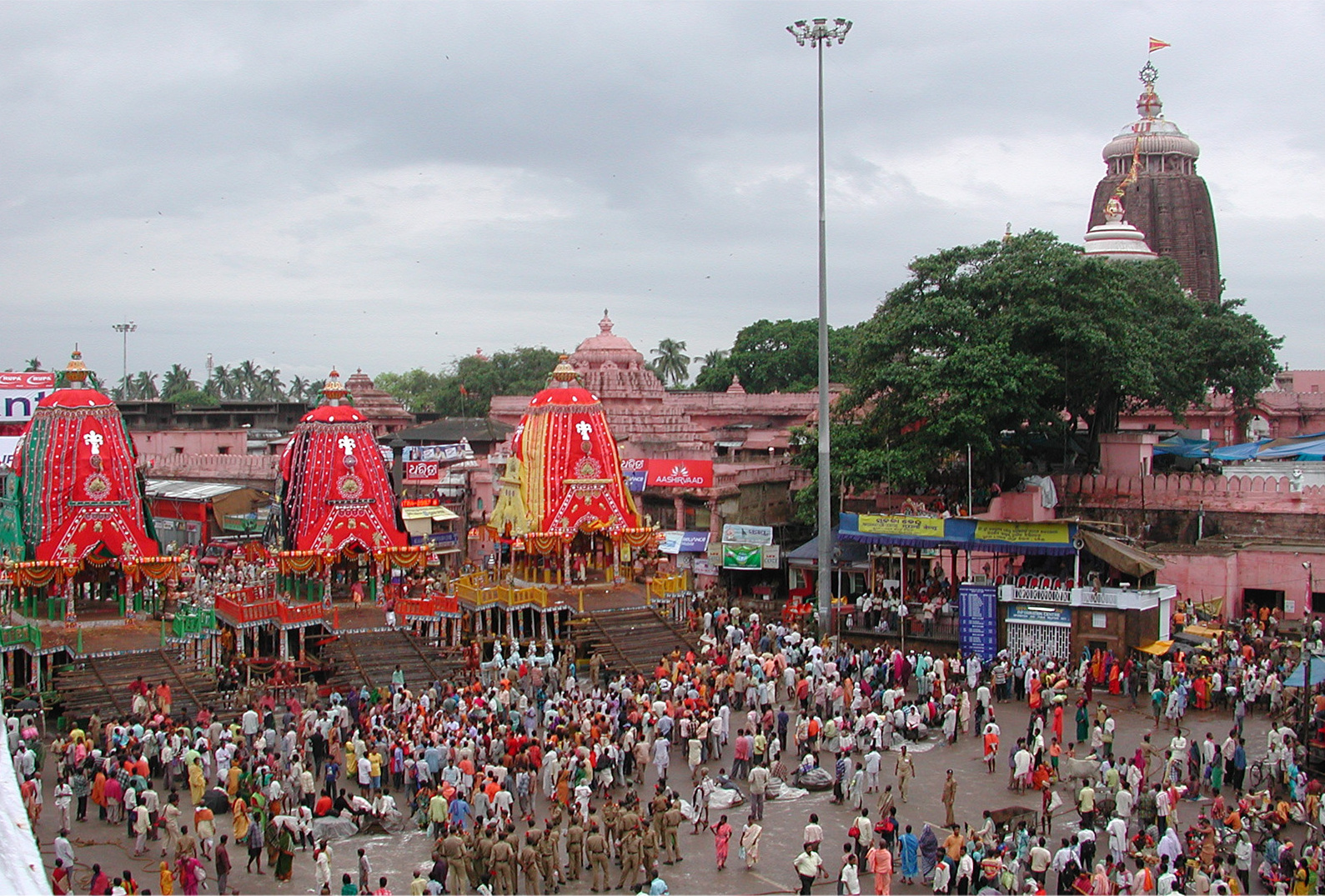
Rath Yatra festival in Puri, Odisha.

A stunning example of Kalinga architecture is the Jagannath Temple, which was constructed in the twelfth century by King Anantavarman Chodaganga Deva. The goddesses Subhadra, Balabhadra, and Lord Jagannath reside in this hallowed shrine. The festival of Ratha Yatra, which draws pilgrims and visitors from all over the world, is closely linked to the history of the Jagannath Temple.

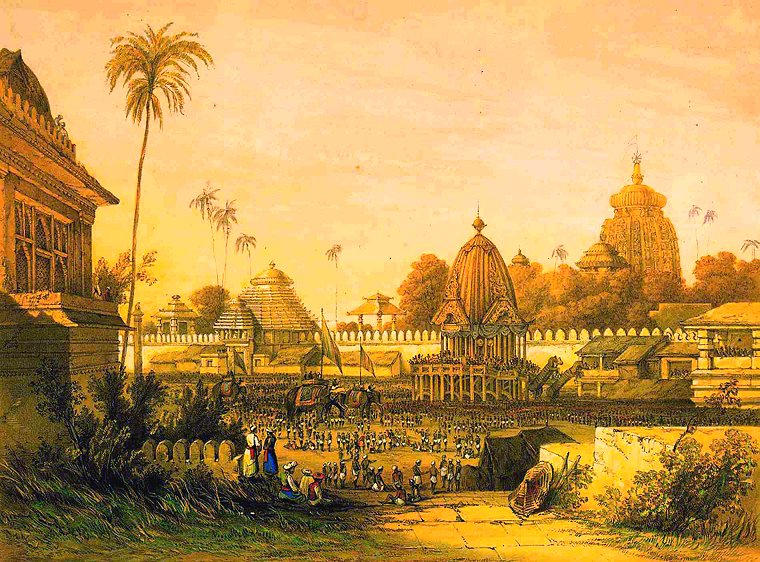
Ratha yatra festival in Puri by Fegursson.

A wide variety of festivals are celebrated throughout the year; There is a saying in Odia, ‘Baarah maase, terah parba’, that there are 13 festivals in a year. Well known festivals that are popular among the Odia people include the Ratha Yatra, Durga Puja, Raja, Maha Shivratri, Kartika Purnima, Dola Purnima, Ganesh Puja, Chandan Yatra, Snana Yatra, Makar Mela, Chhau Festival, and Nuakhai.

=== Religion ===
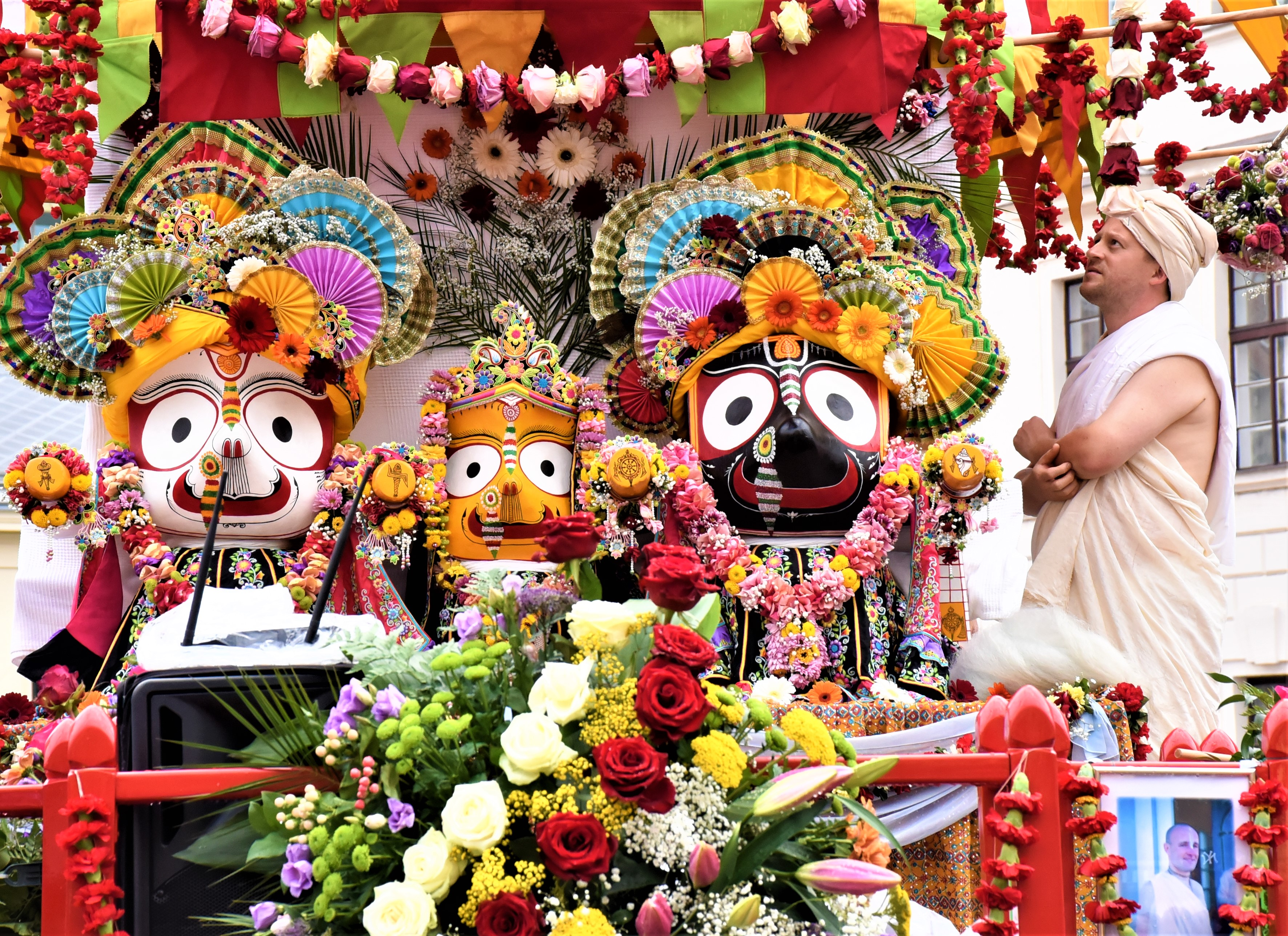
Lord Jagannath with his siblings.

Odisha is one of the most religiously and ethnically homogeneous states in India. More than 94% of the people are followers of Hinduism. Hinduism in Odisha is more significant due to the specific Jagannath culture followed by Odia Hindus due to independent rule of Odia Hindu kings. Hinduism flourished in the eastern coastal region under patronage of the Hindu kings: arts, literature, maritime trade, vedic rituals were given importance. The practices of the Jagannath sect is popular in the state and the annual Ratha Yatra in Puri draws pilgrims from across India.

Odia Poem Nadi by Ratnakar Sutar

== Notable people ==
- Achyutananda Dasa – 16th-century Indian devotional poet
- Binayak Acharya – Indian politician (1918–1983)
- Subroto Bagchi – Indian entrepreneur and business leader
- Sadhabas - Traders and Merchants from Odisha( Kalinga)
- Kaundinya I - Kalingan Merchant & second monarch of Funan
- Madhusudan Das - Founder of Orissa Art Wares in 1898 and Utkal Tannery in 1905
- Biju Patnaik - Founder of Kalinga tubes, Kalinga Airlines, Kalinga Iron work, Kalinga Refractories and the Kalinga, a daily Odia newspaper
- Bhikari Bal – Indian singer (1929–2010)
- Hemananda Biswal – Indian politician (1939–2022)
- Bhagabat Behera – Indian politician from Odisha (1940–2002)
- Chakradhar Behera – Revolutionary from Odisha, India
- Chandi Prasad Mohanty – Indian Army general
- Sanatan Mahakud – Indian politician
- Krishna Beura – Indian playback singer
- Kadambini Mohakud – Cricketer
- Achyuta Samanta - Founder, KIIT Group
- Soumya Ranjan Patnaik - Founder, Sambad Group
- Dr Swarup Ranjan Mishra - Founder, Mediheal Group of Hospitals, Kenya & 1st Odia MP of Kenya, from Kesses Constituency
- Dr Ramakanta Panda - Founder, Asian Heart Institute & Asian Hospitals
- Dutee Chand – Indian sprinter (born 1996)
- Nabakrushna Choudhuri – Indian politician and activist (1901–1984)
- Ashok Das – Indian American physicist
- Bibhusita Das – Indian marine engineer
- Bidhu Bhusan Das
- Bishwanath Das – Indian politician, lawyer, and philanthropist
- Gopabandhu Das – Indian writer (1877–1928)
- Madhusudan Das – Freedom fighter, lawyer and social reformer from Odisha, India (1848–1934)
- Manoj Das – Indian author (1934–2021)
- Nandita Das – Indian actress, director
- Prabhat Nalini Das – First Director/Dean of the Humanities Division at IIT Kanpur
- Shaktikanta Das – Indian bureaucrat (born 1957)
- Anil Dash – American technology executive and entrepreneur
- Rajendra Narayan Singh Deo – Indian politician (1912–1975)
- Giridhar Gamang – Indian politician
- Biswabhusan Harichandan – Indian politician (born 1934)
- Binod Kanungo – Indian educationalist and author (1912–1990)
- Madhu Sudan Kanungo – Indian gerontologist (1927–2011)
- Indrajit Mahanty – 6th Chief Justice of Tripura High Court
- Jayanta Mahapatra – Indian poet (1928–2023)
- Harekrushna Mahatab – Indian politician (1899 – 1987)
- Lalit Mansingh – Former Indian diplomat
- Chaturbhuj Meher – Indian weaver (born 1935)
- Gangadhar Meher – Indian (Odia-language) poet born in Utkala (1862-1924)
- Kailash Chandra Meher – Indian artist and painter
- Kunja Bihari Meher – Indian weaver (1928–2008)
- Sadhu Meher – Indian actor, director and producer (1939/1940–2024)
- Pramod Kumar Mishra – 13th Principal Secretary to the Prime Minister of India (born 1948)
- Sabyasachi Mishra – Indian film actor
- Baidyanath Misra – Indian economist, educationist, author, and administrator (1920–2019)
- B. K. Misra – Indian Neurosurgeon
- Dipak Misra – 45th Chief Justice of India
- Ranganath Misra – 21st Chief Justice of India
- Tapan Misra – Indian scientist
- Biren Mitra – Indian politician (1917–1978)
- Anubhav Mohanty – Indian actor and former social activist
- Baisali Mohanty – Odissi dancer
- Debashish Mohanty – Indian cricketer (born 1976)
- Surendra Mohanty – Odia writer, politician
- Uttam Mohanty – Indian actor (1958–2025)
- Bibhu Mohapatra – Fashion designer
- Kelucharan Mohapatra – Indian classical dancer (1926–2004)
- Sona Mohapatra – Indian singer
- Arabinda Muduli
- Droupadi Murmu – President of India since 2022
- Srabani Nanda – Indian sprinter (born 1991)
- Bibhuti Bhushan Nayak – Indian journalist (born 1965)
- Pragyan Ojha – Former Indian cricketer
- Nila Madhab Panda – Indian film director
- Arun K. Pati – Indian physicist
- Biju Patnaik – Indian politician and aviator (1916-1997)
- Janaki Ballabh Patnaik – Politician from Odisha, India (1927–2015)
- Jayanti Patnaik – Indian parliamentarian and social worker (1933–2022)
- Naveen Patnaik – Indian politician and former Chief Minister of Odisha (born 1946)
- Sudarshan Patnaik – Indian Sand Artist
- Sambit Patra – Indian politician (born 1974)
- Devdutt Pattanaik – Indian mythologist and writer (born 1970)
- Dharmendra Pradhan – Indian politician (born 1969)
- Manasi Pradhan – Indian writer and Women's rights activist
- S.N. Pradhan – Director general of police
- Tapan Kumar Pradhan – Indian writer
- Ramakanta Rath – Indian poet from Odisha (1934–2025)
- Nilamani Routray – Indian politician (1920–2004)
- Sarojini Sahoo – Indian (Odia) Writer
- Archita Sahu – Indian actress and model
- Jairam Samal – Odia actor
- Debasish Samantray – Indian cricketer (born 1996)
- Biplab Samantray – Indian cricketer (born 1988)
- Pratap Chandra Sarangi – Indian politician (born 1955)
- Nandini Satpathy – Indian politician (1931–2006)
- Fakir Mohan Senapati – Indian Odia author
- Sadashiva Tripathy
- Bijaya Kumar Sahoo – Indian educationalist (1963–2021)

== See also ==
- Odia diaspora
- Folk dance forms of Odisha
- Odia language
- Arts of Odisha
- Kalinga architecture
- Cinema of Odisha
