= Bonaz =

Indo-Aryan community

Total population
- 4,400

Regions with significant populations
- Srimangal (Bangladesh) - 4,000; Tripura, India - 400

Languages
- Odia

Religion
- Hinduism (majority), Christianity (minority)

Related ethnic groups
- Indo-Aryan peoples, Odia diaspora

The Bonaz people (Odia: ବୋନାଜ, romanized: Bonaj) are an Odia diaspora community that live in Srimangal, Bangladesh and Tripura, India.

In the nineteenth century, the British brought them over from Odisha to work as tea garden labourers in Srimangal. They are Hindus and maintain a distinct identity in addition to their Bangladeshi identity, due to cultural, linguistic, geographical and historical reasons. Many have adopted the Bengali language; although only 10% of the community are actually literate in the language. They celebrate Phagwah and Durga Puja, and have managed to preserve some of their ballads and folk-tales orally as well as through performing cultural festivals. They are led by a leader known as a Behera and split into eight clans: Nag, Khanda, Tanidiya, Dudhusha, Rakta Kushila, Suryabamsa, Baghabamsa and Mahanandiya.

== See also ==
- History of Sylhet
