= Bhikampali =

- Village
- Location of Bhikampali in Odisha, India Bhikampali (India)
- Coordinates: 21°47′12.5″N 83°34′14″E
- Country: India
- State: Odisha
- District: Jharsuguda
- Official Language: Odia
- Native Language: Odia and Sambalpuri
- First settled: 1957

Government
  - Type: Gram Panchayat
  - Body: Gram Panchayat of Bhikampali

Area
  - Total: 3.28 km^{2} (1.27 sq mi)
- Elevation: 208 m (682 ft)

Population (2011)
  - Total: 920
- Time zone: UTC+5:30 (IST)
- PIN: 768 226
- Area code: +91-6645
- Vehicle registration: OR-23
- Nearest city: Raigarh
- Vidhan Sabha constituency: Brajarajnagar
- Lok Sabha constituency: Bargarh
- Avg. summer temperature: 45 °C (113 °F)
- Avg. winter temperature: 23 °C (73 °F)

Bhikampali is a medium-sized village in the Jharsuguda district of Odisha, India. It is situated on the banks of Saan-kelo River in the foothill of Chhelia Pahad. The village is located at a distance of 60 km from the district headquarter of Jharsuguda. It is within the Brajarajnagar assembly constituency, and the Bargarh Parliament constituency. As of 2011 census, its population is 920.

== Etymology ==
The name Bhikampali is derived from Sanskrit word 'Vikhsapally' which itself is a combination of words 'Vikhsa' and 'Pally'. It later took the flavour of local Koshali language and became Bhikamapali.

== History ==
The ancient town of Padampur was submerged in the backwater of Hirakud Dam when construction of the dam was completed in 1957. This led to people of Padampur town to relocated to multiple nearby small villages located in higher altitudes. One diaspora settled in a very small village named 'Vikshapally' around 2 km from the submerged town. This led to the settlement of the village now known as Bhikampali.

== Geography ==
Bhikampali is situated in the foothill of Chhelia Pahad hill. Total area of the village is 3.28 square km (811.620 acres). Two small rivers Sankelo and Badkelo flows to the Mahanadi river to the west of the village. The Mahanadi river with Hirakud reservoir backwater is at a distance of 2 km from the village. Hemgir Forest Range lies to the north of the village. The village is on the outskirts of Chhotanagpur plateau. The adjacent Chhelia Pahad hill is rich in Quartzite. The village is very near to the Chhattisgarh border and surrounded by other villages like Chikhilapali, Kapilapur, Bausenpali and Attabira.

== Climate ==
The village is situated at 21.47° north longitude and 83.34° east latitude and at a height of 649–682 feet above mean sea level. The highest temperature recorded in summer is 48.0 °C and it has an average rain fall of 1527 mm.

Climate data for Bhikampali
Month	Jan	Feb	Mar	Apr	May	Jun	Jul	Aug	Sep	Oct	Nov	Dec	Year
Record high °C (°F)	32 (90)	35 (95)	41 (106)	43 (109)	47 (117)	46 (115)	37 (99)	35 (95)	35 (95)	36 (97)	32 (90)	31 (88)	47 (117)
Mean daily maximum °C (°F)	28 (82)	30 (86)	34 (93)	40 (104)	42 (108)	38 (100)	31 (88)	31 (88)	31 (88)	31 (88)	30 (86)	28 (82)	33 (91)
Mean daily minimum °C (°F)	12 (54)	15 (59)	18 (64)	24 (75)	27 (81)	28 (82)	24 (75)	25 (77)	24 (75)	21 (70)	16 (61)	12 (54)	21 (69)
Record low °C (°F)	8 (46)	8 (46)	16 (61)	18 (64)	22 (72)	22 (72)	22 (72)	22 (72)	22 (72)	15 (59)	12 (54)	7 (45)	7 (45)
Average precipitation mm (inches)	18.6 (0.73)	21 (0.8)	13.5 (0.53)	21.3 (0.84)	42.2 (1.66)	221.0 (8.70)	377.4 (14.86)	409.6 (16.13)	241.9 (9.52)	58.7 (2.31)	13.8 (0.54)	6.0 (0.24)	1,445 (56.86)
Average rainy days (≥ 0.01)	1.4	1.5	1.5	2.0	3.3	9.7	16.1	16.8	11.2	3.6	0.8	0.5	68.4
Average relative humidity (%)	61	55	45	40	40	61	86	86	85	77	67	64	64
Source: Weatherbase

== Transport ==
The National Highway 130 (Old NH-200) (Raipur to Chandikhol) passes through the village. So it is well connected to the district headquarter Jharsuguda and nearest city Raigarh in Chhattisgarh via road. It is well connected to neighbouring villages through pukka roads constructed under Pradhan Mantri Gramya Sadak Yojna. Ferry service is available to neighbouring Bargarh and Sambalpur districts through Hirakud reservoir. There is no railroad connectivity to the village as of now. The nearest major railway station is Raigarh at a distance of 22 km. The nearest major railway stations in Odisha are Belpahar (40 km) and Jharsuguda.

The nearest major Airports are Bhubaneswar, Raipur and Kolkata.

== Governance ==
The village is governed under the Panchayati Raj system. Bhikamppali gram panchayat is the local administrative body for Bhikampali village. Electorally elected Sarpanch serves a term of 5 years as the head of the gram panchayat. Bhikampali comes under Lakhanpur Panchayat Samiti (Block). Lakhanpur is also the Tehsil office for the village. It is one of the five R.I. circles of Lakhanpur block having 34 villages under it. It comes within Brajarajnagar assembly constituency and Bargarh parliamentary constituency.

== Economy ==
Traditionally, most of the villagers depend on farming for a livelihood. But from the past two decades, two major mines of TRL Krosaki and OCL India are operational in the nearby Chhelia Pahad hill. These have provided alternate employment opportunities for the villagers and also prompted a real estate boom in the village. There is a branch of Utkal Grameen Bank to cater to the banking needs of the villagers. Also, a co-operative society bank branch is there in the village for agricultural financing.

== Demography ==
Bhikampali village has a population of 920 of which 448 are males while 472 are females as per Population Census 2011. In Bhikampali village population of children with age 0–6 is 112 which makes up 12.17% of total population of the village. Average Sex Ratio of Bhikampali village is 1054 which is higher than Odisha state average of 979. Child Sex Ratio for the Bhikampali as per census is 1000, higher than Odisha average of 941. Bhikampali village has higher literacy rate compared to Odisha. In 2011, the literacy rate of Bhikampali village was 72.90% compared to 72.87% of Odisha. In Bhikampali Male literacy stands at 86.73% while female literacy rate was 59.86%.

== Education ==
Primary education is provided by Bhikampali Model Primary School under Odisha government. It is one of the reputed primary education institution in the area with students constantly doing well in district level over the years. The secondary education is provided by Bhikampali Panchayat High School affiliated to Board of Secondary Education, Odisha. Established in 1962, it is one of the oldest high school in the region. The nearest tertiary educational institution is Mahima College, Bijapali.

== Health and social care ==
A formal healthcare system for the village is non-existent. The nearest Primary Healthcare Centre is in the village Palasada which is around 5 km from the village. The nearest Secondary Healthcare Centre is at Lakhanpur (27 km) and Tertiary Healthcare facility is at Jharsuguda. Lack of proper health care facilities in the village forces the villagers to seek out Quacks in case of medical emergency. Odisha government aided 108 ambulance service is available in the village.

== Religion ==
Hinduism is the prevalent religion of the village. Most of the village population is from Schedule Tribe (ST). Schedule Tribe (ST) constitutes 42.17% while Schedule Caste (SC) 8.80% of the total population in the village. Goddess Padmasini is the village deity. There are temples for Goddess Padmasini, Goddess Samalei, Lord Shiva and Lord Hanuman in the village.

== Culture and regular events ==
Sambalpuri is the native language of the village. Odia is widely used for official purpose. Being closer to Chhattisgarh, Laria and Hindi languages are widely spoken and understood in the village. 'Danda Nrutya' and 'Dalkhai' are dance form practiced by the villagers. Like all over Odisha, Pakhal is the cuisine of choice. Festival likes Nuakhai, Pushpuni, Rath Yatra, Durga Puja, Ganesh Puja, Diwali and Holi are fervently celebrated in the village. Nama Yangya and Nuakhai Bhetghat are other regular annual events in the village.

== Sport and leisure ==
Cricket and Football are by far the dominant sports of the village. Regular sporting events involving Cricket and Football are held in the village annually. The village Cricket and Football teams participate in various competitions held in the region. Other traditional sports like Kabaddi, Kho kho, Gilli Danda are also quite popular. Sankirtan, Pala, Dramatic events and Fishing are the other forms of leisure for the villagers

== Tourism ==
Only a decade old, the new Padmasini temple is a major tourist attraction. The nearby Ghanteswari Temple and boating facilities in Hirakud reservoir brings many people to the village. All the temples of Padampur town got submerged after Hirakud dam was completed in 1957. Remnants of those temples submerged in Hirakud dam backwater are still present to this date. In the summer season, the receding water of the dam makes the structures become visible. The hidden treasures are a major attraction for the historians and civilians alike. The famous Koili Ghugar waterfall is just 15 km from the village.
