= Robert Alai =

Kenyan blogger and cyber-activist

Robert Alai Onyango

Member of County Assembly for Kileleshwa ward in Nairobi City County
- Incumbent
- Assumed office 9 August 2022
- Governor: Johnson Sakaja
- Preceded by: Elias Otieno Okumu

Personal details
- Born: Robert Alai Onyango; 11 November 1979 (age 46) Nairobi, Kenya
- Occupation: Nairobi Member of County Assembly, Blogger
- Website: www.techmtaa.com

Robert Alai Onyango, HSC is a Kenyan politician, blogger and cyber-activist who currently serves as Member for County Assembly Kileleshwa ward in Nairobi City County.

Alai, who used to run the now defunct information technology weblog at Techmtaa.com earned notoriety for his stream of social rants. He was then sued and briefly incarcerated for his highly opinionated political and sometimes personal attacks on politicians, government officials and business leaders.

== Career ==
=== Activism ===
On 17 June 2019 Robert Alai was arrested in Nairobi and detained for 14 days for sharing gory photos of police officers who were killed by an IED attack in Wajir. In the wake of the Westgate shopping mall attack in Nairobi where over 65 people were killed, Alai was praised, both by local and international media for his timely and creative use of social media, mainly Twitter, to provide updates of what was happening at the mall. His accounts were considered as being more accurate than - and sometimes contradicting - the updates provided by the authorities.

== Controversies ==
=== Violation of Privacy Laws ===
In December 2014, Ndegwa Muhoro, the Kenya CID Chief, ordered the arrest of Robert Alai for allegedly sharing President Uhuru Kenyatta's contacts on Twitter. He was consequently charged "with undermining Uhuru". Alai's Twitter handle @robertalai was suspended on 18 December 2014, but was later reinstated.

=== Land Grabbing and Land scams ===
In May 2025, Daily Nation reported Alai to be involved in land grabbing of private property of a company in Runda by forcefully and illegally taking over the land owned by the private company. Alai was reported to have broken into the property along with goons using crude weapons who then proceeded to attack the director of the company owning the property. The reports shocked many who hailed Alai as a whistleblower of lands scams in Kenya but was now doubling up by active individual participation in other land scams. According to the director of the company, Alai was reported to intimidate police officers using his political connections when the matter regarding the land scam was reported at Runda police station. In the same Matter Alai was sued in the environment and lands court with the company seeking temporary injunctions against Alai and his agents.

=== Defamation Suits & Fake News Activities ===
==== Mediheal Hospital ====
In April 2021, a Nairobi High court barred Alai from defaming Mediheal hospital and its founder by publishing malicious and false accusations against the hospital and its founder on Facebook and Twitter without any evidence. Alai in his posts linked Mediheal hospital and its founder to organ trafficking merely to gain followers on social media and in the process profit from fake news while subjecting the hospital to irreparable reputational damage.

==== Fred Machoka ====
In June 2025, Machoka filed a defamation lawsuit demanding Ksh 60m from Alai for publishing malicious and fake stories in social media posts by claiming Machoka is HIV positive without any evidence or basis. According to Machoka, Alai targeted him with fake news and digital defamation on his social media post without any legal or medical grounds, but Alai was just out to profit from his fake news activities on his social media pages.

==== Radio Africa ====
In June 2025, Radio Africa Group sued Alai for publishing malicious, defamatory and fake news on his social media posts without any legal basis or evidence but just to profit from fake news
