= Bargarh =

Bargarh Ricebowl of Odisha, City Of Handloom
- Town
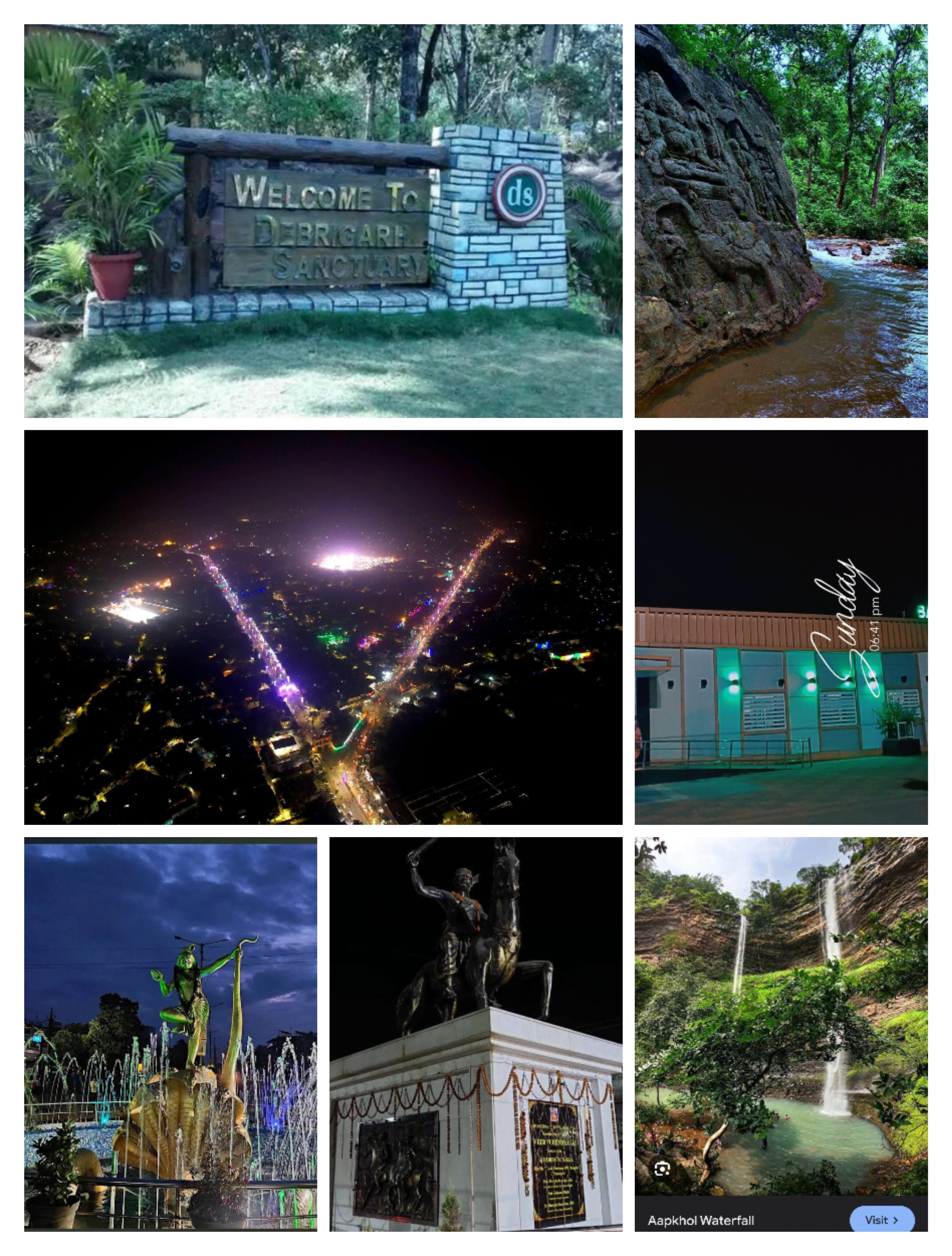
- From Top Left: Debrigarh Wildlife Sanctuary, Nrusinghanath stream, Drone view of Bargarh Town during Dhanujatra, Bargarh Railway Station, Krishna Statue, VSS Statue, Aapkhol Waterfall
- Nickname: Bhatahandi
- Location in Odisha, India Bargarh (India) Bargarh (Asia) Bargarh (Earth)
- Coordinates: 21°20′N 83°37′E
- Country: India
- State: Odisha
- District: Bargarh district
- Established: As Municipality ULB 1951(wef.1952)

Government
  - Type: Municipality
  - Body: Bargarh Municipality
  - Member of Parliament: Pradip Purohit (BJP)
  - Member of Legislative Assembly: Ashwini kumar Sarangi (BJP)
- Elevation: 171 m (561 ft)
- Demonym: Bargadia

Languages
  - Official: Odia, English
  - Local: Sambalpuri
- Time zone: UTC+5:30 (IST)
- PIN: 768028
- Vehicle registration: OD-17
- Website: http://bargarh.nic.in

Bargarh (IPA: [bɔɾgɔɽʰ]) is a town and the administrative headquarters of Bargarh district in the state of Odisha, India.

== Geography ==
Bargarh is located in Western Odisha, close to the border of neighboring state of Chhattisgarh. It is positioned at 21.33°N 83.62°E with an average elevation of 171 meters (561 feet). The Bargarh district lies in the Plain with Eastern Ghats running close to the town. As per the earthquake zoning of India, Bargarh falls in the zone- ll category, the least earthquake prone zone.

== Demographics ==
As of the 2011 Census of India, Bargarh had a population of 83,651. Males constitute 52% of the population and females 48%. Bargarh has an average literacy rate of 76%, higher than the national average of 59.5%; with 57% of the males and 43% of females literate. 11% of the population is under 6 years of age.

Other than Oriya speaking people who form the majority, the town has some Marwari community who have migrated and settled down. Within the Oriya speaking population, the major communities are Kuiltas, Dumals, Agharias, Bhulia/Meher, Teli, etc. Kuiltas and Dumals are presumed to be an offshoot of the original Chasa (agrarian) community and are synonymous with the Khandayats of the coastal region. This is evident by the striking similarity of rituals and the gods they pray. Bhulias were migrated to and settled in this region by some rulers, but the exact time period is controversial. Agharia's were migrated from the Mughal empire of Agra for establishing a cultivator community during the war when Kuiltas were assigned the duty of part-time Kshatriyas.

=== Languages ===
Languages spoken in Bargarh Town (2011)
1. Odia (40.6%)
2. Sambalpuri (41.2%)
3. Hindi (12.2%)
4. Urdu (1.19%)
5. Telugu (0.98%)
6. Others (4.11%)

== Politics ==
The political area of Bargarh comprises 1 Lok Sabha (Parliament) and 7 Vidhan Sabha (Assembly) constituencies.

Pradip Purohit of BJP is the elected MP from Bargarh Lok Sabha constituency, which covers areas of Bargarh as well as Jharsuguda.

Naveen Patnaik was the elected MLA from Bijepur to the Legislative Assembly of Odisha, who was the Ex Chief Minister of Odisha. But later he resigned as MLA from Bijepur Assembly Constituency.

Ashwini Kumar Sarangi is the elected MLA from Bargarh to the Legislative Assembly of Odisha.
