= The Odisha Society of the Americas =

Odisha Society of the Americas
- Abbreviation: OSA
- Formation: 1970
- Legal status: Voluntary Association
- Purpose: Awareness of Odia Language and Culture
- Location(s): United States and Canada
- Official language: Odia; English
- Website: www.odishasociety.org

The Odisha Society of the Americas, or OSA, is an organization whose stated goals are to promote the culture of the Indian state of Odisha in the United States and Canada, and to facilitate the exchange of information between Odisha and North America. Founded in 1969, OSA is registered as a 501(c)(3) charitable organization in the United States. The main event of the organization is an annual convention which aims to bring members of the Odia diaspora together to celebrate their ethnic culture. It held an annual get-together called convention, where people of Odia origin from different parts of USA and Canada mingled and shared experiences of ethnic living.

== Current status ==
Today, OSA is a strong organization with 1500 or more individual and family members. This is due to individuals stepping forward to support different activities with innovative ideas which, when implemented, benefit us all. The organization has now spread into thirteen regional chapters, which operate as a social umbrella for different regions in the US and Canada. The chapters arrange various activities such as religious festivals, social get together, cultural events and participate in the cultural life of the local community as representatives of Odia culture. Besides these, the annual convention is the centerpiece of the society's activities.

== Vision ==
The society's vision is to promote and propagate Odia culture in Americas by bringing together all the people interested in Odisha.

== Mission Goals ==
The mission goals of The Odisha Society of Americas are:

· To provide a mutually supportive environment for the better interaction of Odia immigrants of North American countries through socio-cultural growth, friendship and fellowship.

· To enhance the awareness of Odisha and Odia traditions in North America through cultural promotion, social events, and developmental activities.

· To facilitate the exchange of information between Odisha and the United States/Canada.

== Chapters in USA & Canada ==
There are 14 chapters in USA and 1 chapter in Canada. A new chapter, California chapter is under formation.

Chapter Name	Chapter Serving Area	Formation Year
Chicago	Illinois, Wisconsin	NA
Georgia	Georgia	2020
Grand Canyon	Arizona, Utah, Colorado, New Mexico	2009
Maryland - Virginia	Maryland, Virginia	1995
Michigan	Michigan	1988
North West	Minnesota	1990
New England	Massachusetts, Connecticut, Rhode Island, Maine, New Hampshire	1983
New York/New Jersey	New York, New Jersey, Pennsylvania	1970 as OSANY 2005 as OSANYNJ
Ohio	Ohio	NA
Ozark (central)	Kansas, Kentucky, Iowa, Missouri	NA
Pacific Northwest	Oregon, Washington, British Columbia & Neighboring States	2011
South East	North Carolina, South Carolina, Georgia	NA
Southern	Tennessee, Louisiana, Mississippi. Alabama, Kentucky	NA
South-West	Texas, Arkansas, New Mexico, Oklahoma	NA
Washington, DC	Maryland, Virginia, Washington DC, Delaware, West Virginia	1984
Canada	Canada	1971

== Events ==
OSA Convention

The annual convention of The Odisha Society of the Americas takes place during the July 4th weekend every year. The main responsibility of hosting the convention rests with the local chapters of OSA. At times when local chapters do not bid for the convention, Odia communities under the leadership of an OSA life member and with 15 or more OSA members do take charge of organizing the convention. The convention serves to bring together people with roots in Odisha to share the pride in Odia culture and heritage and pass it on to the next generation. The annual convention is the centerpiece of OSA's activities. The 52nd OSA convention was held from July 2 to 4, 2021 at the newly built Orissa Culture Center Venue, Houston, Texas. The 53rd OSA convention was held from July 1 to 3, 2022 in Sacramento, California.

Past/Future OSA Conventions

Year	Place
2026	Minneapolis, MN
2025	Dallas, TX
2024	Nashville, TN
2023	Chicago, IL https://osanaconvention.org/
2022	Sacramento, CA https://osa2022.org/
2021	Houston, TX
2020	Virtual
2019	Atlantic City, New Jersey
2018	Detroit, Michigan
2017	Bahamas Cruise
2016	Providence, Rhode Island
2015	National Harbor, Maryland
2014	Columbus, Ohio
2013	Chicago, IL
2012	Seattle, WA
2011	Dallas, TX
2010	Redwood City, CA
2009	Trenton, New Jersey
2008	Toronto, ONT
2007	Detroit, MI
2006	Columbia, MD
2005	Newport Beach, CA
2004	Dallas, TX
2003	Princeton, NJ
2002	Greenbelt, MD
2001	Chicago, IL
1999	Toronto, Canada
1998	Monterey, CA
1997	Houston, TX
1996	Washington, DC
1995	Minneapolis, MN
1994	Pomona, NJ
1993	Troy, MI
1992	Atlanta, GA
1991	Chicago, IL
1990	Washington, DC
1989	Nashville, TN
1988	Saginaw, MI
1987	Stanford, CA
1986	Toronto, Canada
1985	Kent, OH
1984	Glassboro, NJ
1983	Bowie, MD
1982	Minneapolis, MN
1981	Chicago, IL
1980	Detroit, MI
1979	New Brunswick, NJ
1978	Wheaton, MD
1977	Riverdale, NJ
1976	Toronto, Canada
1975	Riverdale, NJ
1974	College Park, MD
1973	Riverdale, NJ
1972	Riverdale, NJ
1971	Hartford, CT
1970	Hartford, CT

OSA Regional Oriya Drama Festival

OSA Drama Festival started in 2009 for the first time. Dr Gopal Mohanty was the festival coordinator. The concept of regional drama festival went into effect during the month of April 2009 at 3 sites, Texas, Michigan and Washington DC. OSA is planning to continue the tradition in its present form or in an improved form (combining music and dances) for the future. OSA Southwest Chapter Drama Festival-2013 was held at Austin on 14 September 2013.

Year	Region	Drama	Chapter
2009	South-West Region	Athacha Chanakya(ଅଥଚ ଚାଣକ୍ୟ)	Dallas
2009	South-West Region	Sahitya Gadia Manthana(ସାହିତ୍ୟ ଗଡିଆ ମନ୍ଥନ )	Austin
2009	South-West Region	E ki Nataka(ଏ କି ନାଟକ )	Arkansas
2009	South-West Region	Mom, Ma Aau Madam(ମୋମ୍, ମା ଆଉ ମାଡାମ୍)	Houston
2009	Eastern Region	Gitinatya Sri Ganesha(ଗୀତିନାଟ୍ୟ ଶ୍ରୀ ଗଣେଶ)	DC
2009	Eastern Region	Pathoi Bohu(ପାଠୋଇ ବୋହୁ)	DC
2009	Eastern Region	Gua Nimantran(ଗୁଆ ନିମନ୍ତ୍ରଣ)	NY/New Jersey|NJ
2009	Northern Region	Banna Nasika(ବନ ନାଶିକ)	Canada
2009	Northern Region	Gitinatya Mahisa Mardini(ଗୀତିନାଟ୍ୟ ମହିଶା ମର୍ଦିନୀ)	MI
2010	South-West Region	Kalakara Natabara Babunkara Nata(କଳାକାର ନଟବର ବାବୁନକର ନାଟ)	Dallas
2010	South-West Region	Saur Jagatare Ulka Pata(ସୌର ଜଗତରେ ଉଲ୍କା ପାତ)	Arkansas
2010	South-West Region	Habani Na, Habana Aau(ହବନୀ ନା, ହବନା ଆଉ )	Houston
2010	Eastern Region	Kanchi Abhijan(କାଂଚୀ ଅଭିଯାନ)	OSNE Junior artists
2010	Eastern Region	Dasanana: Naka Kata Upakhyana(ଦସାନନ : ନାକ କଟା ଉପାଖ୍ୟାନ)	NY/New Jersey|NJ
2010	Eastern Region	Dinu Kaka Thiika Kahuthile(ଦିନୁ କାକା ଠିକ୍ କହୁଥିଲେ )	OSNE Senior artists
2010	North-Central Region	Uchit Charcha(ଉଚିତ୍ ଚର୍ଚା)	Milwaukee
2010	North-Central Region	Gosein Mahatma(ଗୋସେଇଁ ମହାତ୍ମା)	Detroit
2010	North-Central Region	Jaha Hale Hau(ଯାହା ହେଲେ ହଉ)	Unknown
2012	South-West Region	Bandhoo Mohanty	DFW Kids Drama
2012	South-West Region	Tahele Kie	Austin
2012	South-West Region	Item Girl	Houston
2012	South-West Region	Mayar Kahani	Austin Skit
2012	South-West Region	Paisaara Maayaa, Karuchhi Baayaa	Arkansas
2012	South-West Region	Akala Kusmanda	DFW

== Publications ==
Odisha Society of Americas has been publishing souvenirs of its annual conventions from 1983. In 2019, all the editions were published in Amazon.com in print and Digital through Amazon.com, Google Play and Google Books.

Year	Edition	City	State	Google Play	Google Books	Amazon.com Print	Amazon.com Kindle Digital
1983	14	Washington	D.C.				https://www.amazon.com/dp/B07RJVRXH1
1984	15	Glassboro	New Jersey				
1985	16	Kent	Ohio				
1986	17	Toronto	Canada				
1987	18	Palo Alto	California				
1988	19	Saginaw	Michigan				
1989	20	Nashville	Tennessee				
1990	21	Washington	D.C.				
1991	22	Chicago	Illinois				
1992	23	Atlanta	Georgia				
1993	24	Detroit	Michigan				
1994	25	Pamona	New Jersey				
1995	26	Minneapolis	Minnesota				
1996	27	Washington	D.C.				
1997	28	Houston	Texas				
1998	29	Monterey	California				
1999	30	Toronto	Canada				
2000	31	Nashville	Tennessee				
2001	32	Chicago	Illinois				
2002	33		Maryland				
2003	34	Princeton	New Jersey				
2004	35	Dallas	Texas				
2005	36	Newport Beach	California				
2006	37	Columbia	Maryland				
2007	38	Detroit	Michigan				
2008	39	Toronto	Canada				
2009	40	Princeton	New Jersey				
2010	41	San Francisco	California				
2011	42	Dallas	Texas				
2012	43	Seattle	Washington				
2013	44	Chicago	Illinois				
2014	45	Columbis	Ohio				
2015	46	National Harbor	Washington				
2016	47	Providence	Rhode Island				
2017	48	Bahas Cruise	Bahamas				
2018	49	Dearborn	Michigan				
2019	50	Atlantic City	New Jersey				

== OSA History ==
OSA Golden Jubilee Convention created History Team. The History Team collected VHS, Hi8 and DVD media of past conventions and events. Founders and members were interviewed. YouTube channel and PlayLists were created.

Year	Description	Link to PlayList/Channel
1983	OSA 1983 Washington DC	
1984	OSA 1984 Glassboro NJ	
1986	OSA 1986 Toronto	
1989	OSA 1989 Nashville TN	
1990	OSA 1990 Washington	
1995	OSA 1995 Minneapolis	
1996	Converted Videos	
1997	OSA 1997 Houston TX	
1998	OSA 1998 Monterey California	
1999	OSA 1999 Toronto	
2000	OSA 2000 Nashville	
2003	OSA 2003 Princeton NJ	
2007	OSA 2007 Detroit	
2007	OSA 2007 Detroit	
2008	OSA 2008 Toronto	
2009	OSA 2009 Trenton NJ	
2011	Rathyatra	
2014	OSA 2014 Ohio	
2015	OSA 2015 Washington DC	
2016	OSA2016 Rhode Island	
2018	OSA 2018 Dearborn MI	
2019	OSA 2019 Atlantic City NJ	
2014-2018	OSA NY/NJ	
2019	Converted Videos	
2019	OSA History Video	
2019	OSA 2019 Channel	
