= Dumont =

Dumont, meaning "from the mount" in French, may refer to:

== People ==
- Dumont (surname)
- Dumont de Montigny (1696–1760), French explorer and author

== Places ==
Brazil

- Dumont, São Paulo

United States

- Dumont, Colorado
- Dumont, Iowa
- Dumont, Minnesota
- Dumont, New Jersey
- Dumont, Texas
- South Houston, Texas, formerly Dumont

== Other uses ==
- Dumont (TV program), a Canadian news program 2009–2012
- DuMont Laboratories, an American television equipment manufacturer
  - DuMont Television Network, which broadcast in the United States from 1946 until 1956
- M. DuMont Schauberg, a German publishing house
- Ulmus × hollandica 'Dumont', a hybrid elm cultivar
