= Swarup Ranjan Mishra =

Kenya MP, Business Person, Doctor

Dr Swarup Ranjan Mishra
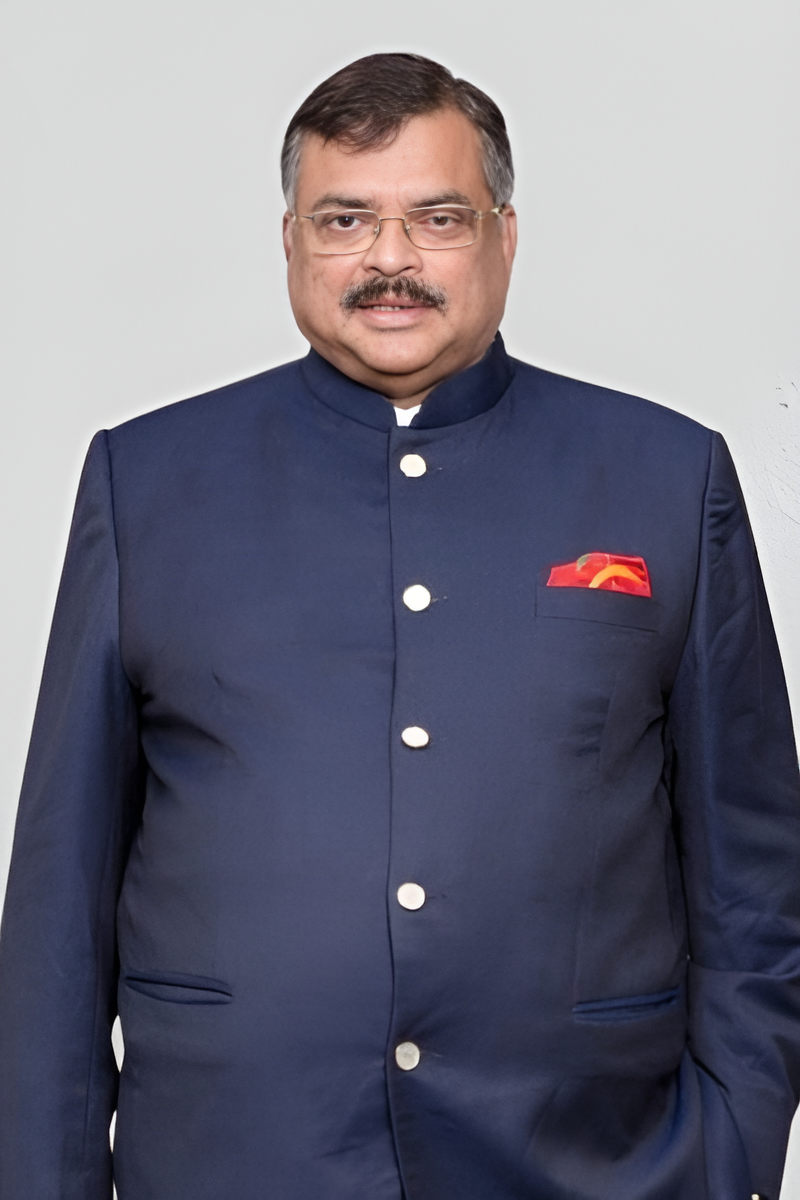
- Swarup Ranjan Mishra in a Professional Portrait
- Born: 18 January 1965 (age 61); Panchapalli, Erasama, Orissa, India
- Citizenship: Kenya
- Education: Berhampur University (Bachelor of Medicine and Bachelor of Surgery); University of Rajasthan (Master’s in Obstetrics and Gynecology); Kiel School of Medicine (Diploma in Gynecological Endoscopy)
- Occupations: Doctor; Entrepreneur; Politician
- Known for: Founder & Chairman of Mediheal Group of Hospitals.; was a Member of Parliament, Kesses Constituency (2017–2022)
- Spouse: Pallavi Mishra

Swarup Ranjan Mishra (born 18 January 1965) is an Indian-born Kenyan doctor, entrepreneur, and politician. He is a gynaecologist and the founder and chairman of Mediheal Group of Hospitals. He has served as a Member of Parliament for Kesses Constituency in Kenya from 2017 to 2022.

== Early life and education ==
Mishra was born in Panchapalli village, Erasama block, Odisha, India. He completed his primary education at Panchapalli School and attended Ravenshaw Collegiate School in Cuttack for his secondary education.

He earned a Bachelor of Medicine and Bachelor of Surgery (MBBS) from Berhampur University, India (1981-1983) and later completed a Master’s in Obstetrics and Gynecology from the University of Rajasthan, India (1991-1994). In 2002, he obtained a Diploma in Gynecological Endoscopy from Kiel School of Medicine, Germany.

After his studies, Mishra worked as a Junior Consultant at P.D. Hinduja Hospital, India (1995-1996). In 1997, he moved to Kenya, where he began his medical practice.

== Career ==
=== Medical and academic work ===
Mishra is the founder and chairman of Mediheal Group of Hospitals, a network of hospitals in Kenya and Rwanda. Mediheal provides specialized medical services, including neurosurgery, IVF, kidney treatment, cardiac care, and critical care. The hospital group has expanded its operations across multiple cities in Kenya.

He has also served as a lecturer and consultant in the Department of Reproductive Health at Moi University, Kenya

=== Scandal ===
In 2021, Daily Nation reported, that the allegations of unethical kidney transplants and organ trafficking originated from a smear campaign by Robert Alai who was barred by the Nairobi High court from publishing defamatory posts alleging Mediheal hospital was involved in illegal trafficking of human organs. In 2024, the Kenya Renal Association issued a statement accusing Mediheal hospital in Eldoret of unethical kidney transplants performed in the facility including transplant commercialization and transplant tourism involving the sale of kidneys and the importation of patients for the purpose of transplantation, claiming it to be a direct violation of the World Health Organization resolutions, the Declaration of Istanbul, and Kenya’s Health Act of 2017, which prohibits organ trade.

In April 2025,Deutsche Welle reported Mediheal group of being involved in illegal trafficking of human organs. It revealed that an investigation commissioned by Kenya's health ministry in 2023 found that donors and recipients were often not related, which is against Kenyan law, with procedures paid for in cash. Although the report recommended further investigation, the report was never made public and no further action was taken. Following this report, the Kenyan health minister ordered a new investigation and in April 2025 a new report confirmed suspicious patterns and glaring irregularities in kidney transplants since 2018. In July 2025, both Mishra and the hospital denied the allegations and accused the Kenyan health ministry of failing to provide the hospital with the alleged report linking the hospital to the organ trafficking allegations.

=== Political career ===
In 2017, Mishra was elected as a Member of Parliament for Kesses Constituency in Kenya’s National Assembly. He has served on various parliamentary committees, including those related to health, security, and administration.

=== Personal life ===
Mishra is married to Pallavi Mishra, who is also a medical professional. The couple resides in Kenya.

== Recognition ==
Mishra has been given the title "Kiprop arap Chelule" by members of the Kenyan community. The name "Kiprop" refers to someone born during the rainy season, while "Chelule" signifies an outsider who has been accepted as part of the community.

== See also ==
- Healthcare in Kenya
- Kenya National Assembly
