= Festivals of Chhattisgarh =

Chhattisgarh embraces a diverse range of cultural and traditional practices in India. As the state government has taken meticulous steps to preserve the tribal culture, these festivals and traditions have been celebrated since ancient times, reflecting the deep-rooted heritage of the region.

== Major festivals ==
=== Bastar Dussehra ===
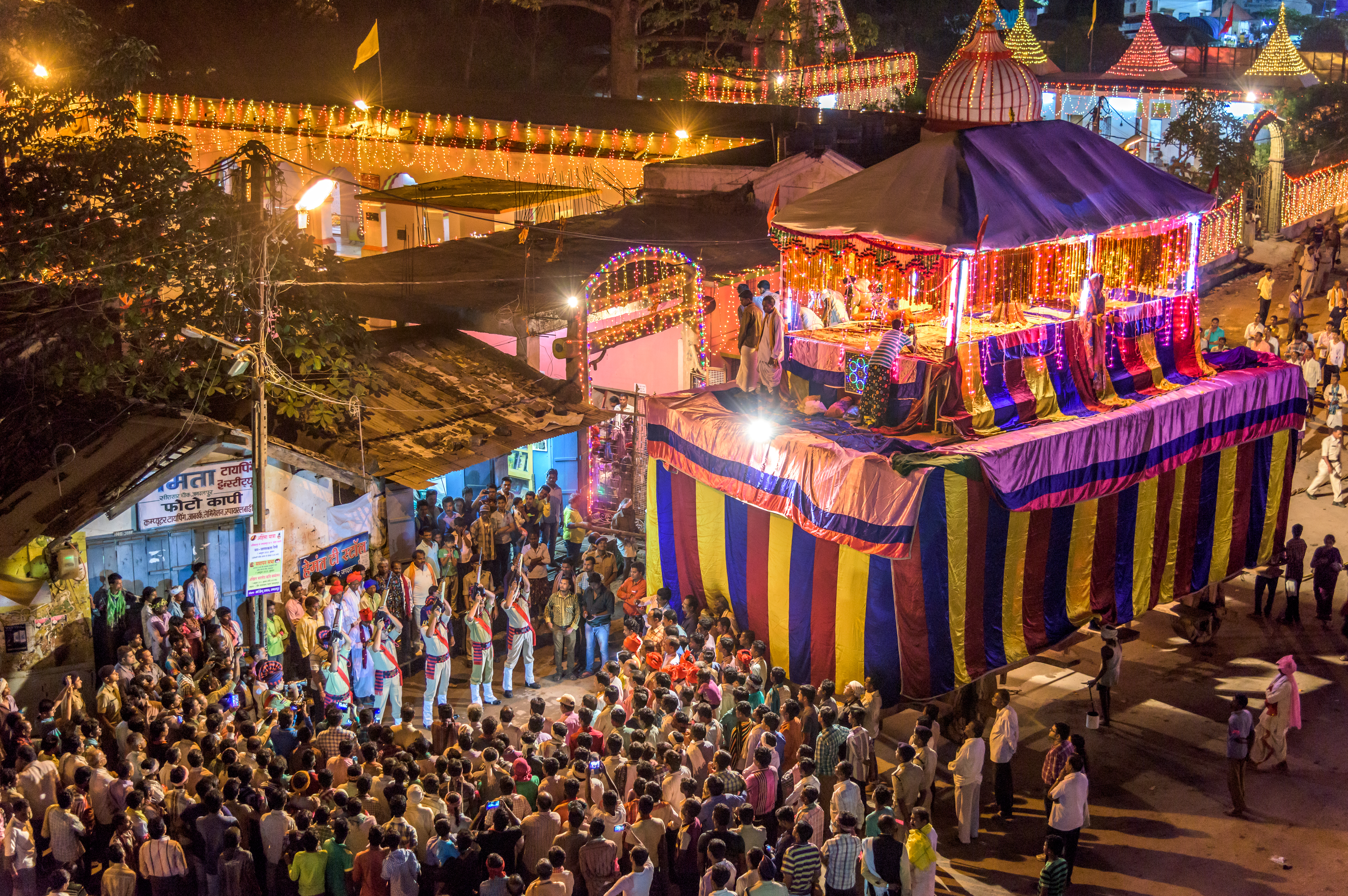
The massive wooden chariot used during the Bastar Dussehra procession.

Bastar Dussehra is the most significant festival of the Bastar division, dedicated to Goddess Danteshwari. Celebrated over a span of 75 days, it is recognized as one of the longest festivals in the world.

=== Bastar Lokotsav ===
Bastar Lokotsav represents the folk culture of Chhattisgarh. It is observed annually after the rainy season (usually in December or January) and features the participation of various tribal groups from remote locations. A major event called "Basta Parab" is organized in Jagdalpur during this time, showcasing tribal songs, dances, and rare handicrafts.

=== Bhoramdeo Mahotsav ===
Held at the historic Bhoramdeo Temple complex in Kabirdham district, this festival is dedicated to Lord Shiva. It was first organized by the kings of the Nagavanshi dynasty in the 14th century. The festival takes place at the end of March, attracting folk artists from across the state who perform traditional dances like Panthi and Raut Nacha.

=== Champaran Mela ===
Champaran is a major pilgrimage site as the birthplace of Saint Vallabhacharya, the founder of the Pushtimarg sect. Two major fairs are organized here annually: one during the birth anniversary of the saint in April and a larger one during Kartik Purnima (October–November), attended by Vaishnav devotees from across India.

=== Rajim Maghi Punni Mela ===
Formerly known as Rajim Kumbh, this is one of the largest religious congregations in the state. It is held at the "Prayag of Chhattisgarh," the confluence (sangam) of the Mahanadi, Pairi, and Sondur rivers. The mela begins on Magh Purnima and ends on Mahashivratri, featuring holy baths and spiritual discourses.

== Cultural and language observances ==
- Chhattisgarh Rajyotsava: Celebrated on 1 November to commemorate the formation of the state in 2000. It is a multi-day cultural and industrial festival held primarily in Naya Raipur.
- Chhattisgarhi Rajbhasha Diwas: Observed on 28 November to celebrate the day in 2007 when Chhattisgarhi was granted the status of an official state language by the Vidhan Sabha.

== Agricultural and tribal festivals ==
=== Goncha Festival ===
Also known as the Chariot Festival, it coincides with the Rath Yatra of Puri. It is famous for the "Tupki" tradition, where tribal youth use bamboo mock-guns to shoot Goncha fruits as harmless projectiles.

=== Madai Festival ===
An important festival of the Gond Tribe, Madai is celebrated from December to March. It is a traveling festival that moves from one village to another (starting from Bastar and moving to Narayanpur and Kanker), where devotees worship the local presiding deity.

=== Hareli ===
Considered the first festival of the agricultural year, Hareli is celebrated in the month of Shravan (July–August). Farmers worship their agricultural tools and cows, and children play with bamboo stilts called "Gidi."

=== Pora ===
Celebrated on Bhadrapada Amavasya, Pora is a thanksgiving festival for bulls and oxen used in farming. Farmers decorate their cattle, and children participate by worshipping wooden or clay figurines of the Nandi bull.

=== Tribal Pandums ===
- Bija Pandum (First Fruit Festival): An annual ritual in the Bastar region where tribal communities offer the first seeds of the season to the gods to ensure a bountiful harvest.
- Mati Tihaar (Earth Festival): Also known as Mati Puja, this festival is dedicated to Mother Earth. Tribes stay away from their fields on this day to allow the earth to rest, praying for its fertility and protection from famine.

== List of other fairs ==
- Narayanpur Mela: A major Madai-style fair in the Narayanpur district showcasing tribal markets and rituals.
- Teeja (Teej): A monsoon festival where married women observe a rigorous waterless fast (Nirjala) for the well-being of their husbands, dedicating prayers to Goddess Parvati.

== See also ==
- Culture of Chhattisgarh
- Geography of Chhattisgarh
- History of Chhattisgarh
