= Agharia =

Caste from India

Agharia (Caste)
- Classification: Other Backward Classes (OBC) in Chhattisgarh Odisha and Madhya Pradesh.
- Kuladevta (male): Dulha Deo
- Religions: Hinduism
- Languages: Laria, Chhattisgarhi and Odia
- Country: India
- Populated states: Chhattisgarh, Odisha and Madhya Pradesh
- Ethnicity: Indo-Aryan
- Family names: Patel, Chaudhary and Naik
- Lineage: Chandravanshi

Agharia is a Hindu caste predominantly found in the Indian states of Odisha, Chhattisgarh and Madhya Pradesh.

According to their local oral traditions, name of the community is derived from Agra, from where their Somvanshi Rajput ancestors migrated in the 16th century. They were given shelter by the Kalinga king and started living their lives in western parts of Odisha. They came from the Agra region of Uttar Pradesh when Muhammad Adil Shah Suri was the Sultan of Delhi.

== Origin ==
The Agharias are said to be originated from Chandravanshi Tomar Rajputs. Earlier they were known as Agarwal Rajputs, who were said to be the descendants of Vidura of Mahabharata. They trace their migration from Uttar Pradesh particularly from the region of Agra.

According to local oral traditions, the Agharia were Kshatriyas who worked for the Delhi Sultan Muhammad Adil Shah Suri as soldiers but refused to bow in front of him. The king became furious and started killing the Agharias, compelling the remaining to migrate to present day Chhattisgarh from where they went to Odisha. After coming to Odisha they approached the Maharaja of Puri who in turn introduced them to Rajas of Patna, Bamunada, Sambalpur and Sundargarh states. They adopted cultivation as their occupation by the order of the then Gajapati kings of Orissa.

== Clans and sub-divisions ==
Agharias are said to have 84 clans. Out of the total 84 clans of Agharias, 44 clans came to Odisha. 60 bear the title of Patel, 18 that of Naik, and 6 of Chaudhary.

Their caste symbol is the dagger, but it is differently named for the above three classes. The Choudhurys call their symbol 'Kuil Katar', the Nayaks call it 'Jamdarh Katar', while 'Meghnada Katar' is the symbol of the Patels.

They have many subdivisions as the Bad (or superior Agharia), Chotte, Sarolia or Sawaria (mixed or inferior) the latter is a mix between a Ahir women and Agharia man. Among them, the Bad Agharia used to consider them superior than others. Some members of this sub-division also wear the janeu (sacred thread).

== Occupation ==
They used to work as landlords and cultivators, the caste women don't work on fields, nor do they work as labourers for other landlords or cultivators as they considered such things degrading. The caste has abandoned the work of soldiers in the 16th century. Which they used to do for the Delhi Sultans. Though, Agharias belonging to Chhattisgarh have often worked as soldiers for the Maratha Confederacy.

They are the chief cultivators in Gangpur, they also hold the most potential land in the region of Sundargarh and adjoining districts they are industrious farmers. Many of them are now in white collar jobs.

In Gangpur Princely State, most Gountias (intermediary tenure holders responsible for rent collection) were tribals in the early 1800s, but by the 1890s there was a great preference for non-tribal Gountias from the Agharia and other local non-tribal communities. At the time of each renewal, the Gaontia had to pay a lump sum amount to the chief known as Nazrana. In Sambalpur, a Gaontia could not hold more than 20% of the total cultivable land of his Gaontiari. But in Gangpur, a Gaontia could hold more than this and be treated as a rich and influential person in the villages.

This made them rich and powerful landowners and farmers in western Odisha, borders of Odisha and in the region of Raigarh of Chhattisgarh and adjoining districts.

The agricultural land of these regions are mostly held by these people.

== Dialect ==
Laria is the dialect of the Agharia community and varies by region, with roots in the Ardha Magadhi language.

== Tribal and inter-caste conflicts ==
=== Inter-caste conflicts ===
In the British Era, the Agharias were known to be quarrelsome and haughty and had an image of being land-grabbers and hard-landlords. This often led to conflicts with tenants usually belonging to Chamar and other tenant castes.

=== Tribal conflicts ===
In the 19th century, Raja Raghunath Shekhar Deo realising that richer members of the Princely State of Gangpur are higher bidder, started displacing aboriginal Gountias by Agharias and other high caste people from Sambalpur an agitation started under the leadership of Madre Kalo a tribal leader which ended in the Raja giving up his attempt.

== Varna ==
The Agharia community claim to originally belong to the Kshatriya Varna.

They were considered highly respectable and held big positions, ranking above local cultivators due to higher land possessions and Rajput origin.

Previously, they used to wear the janeu (sacred thread) but they no longer wear it.

The Agharia are non-vegetarians who take fish, meat, egg, chicken and mutton. Rice is their staple food. (as of 1997)

== Traditions ==
According to traditions, after coming to Odisha the Agharias took off their janeu (sacred threads), as they had to work as cultivators and gave them to the youngest member of the caste, saying that he should keep them and be their Bhat, and they would support him with contributions of a tenth of the produce of their fields. He assented, and his descendants are the genealogists of the Agharias and are termed Dashanshi.

The kuladevta of the Agharias is Dulha Deo, who exists in every household. On the Hareli day or the commencement of the agricultural year they worship the implements of cultivation, and at Vijayadashmi they worship weapons like Talwar, Parashu, Katar or Khanda if they keep them. They used to worship goddess Kali, but have left it after coming to Odisha.

They used to practice Sati, like other Kshatriya originated castes but they stopped this practice in the 19th century, as this practice was banned during British Era.

== Classification ==
Agharia are classified as OBC (Other Backward Class) in the states of Chhattisgarh, Odisha and Madhya Pradesh.
