= Kesses Constituency =

Electoral constituency of Kenya

Kesses
- constituency for the Parliament of Kenya
- Kesses Constituency within Uasin Gishu County

- Uasin Gishu County within Kenya
- County: Uasin Gishu
- Population: 148,798
- Area: 748 km^{2} (288.8 sq mi)

Current constituency
- Number of members: 1
- Party: UDA
- Member of Parliament: Julius Kipletting Rutto
- Wards: 4

Kesses is a constituency in Kenya, one of six constituencies in Uasin Gishu County, the member of parliament for this constituency is Dr. CPA.Julius Rutto.

== Locations and wards ==
Locations
Location	Population
Cheptiret	12,119
Chuiyat	7,444
Kapkoi	5,935
Kesses	21,697
Kipchamo	25,722
Megun	14,710
Olleinguse	18,992
Tarakwa	19,202
Timboroa	15,027
Tulwet	7,857
Total	148,793
2019 Census

Wards
Ward	Registered voters
Racecourse	17,396
Cheptiret/Kipchamo	14,098
Tulwet/Chuiyat	17,525
Tarakwa	18,117
Total	67,136
