= Dumal =

Hindu caste in western Odisha, India

Dumal, also called Dumala (also known as Mithila Nanda Gauda in eastern Odisha), is a community found in western Odisha, India.

This caste is categorised as an Other Backward Class according to Reservation system of India.

== Origin ==
They were the milk suppliers of Puri and their role was to supply milk, curd and ghee to the temple and guard Lord Jagannath in Puri.

One day, a vulture was found sitting on the Neelachakra of the temple. The puja pandit (priest) had a dream and came to know that the ghee served was impure, for which Lord Jagannath was dissatisfied and thus this vulture appeared. The puja pandit secretly informed the Gajapati Maharaja of this and the King ordered punishment. One official from the court secretly informed the suppliers about the king's decision to punish them the next day. That night those innocent people who supplied ghee to the temple left their houses in Puri with their families to save themselves and went towards the west.
