= Kuilta =

Kuilta or Kulta are one of the farming communities of Odisha state in India. They are especially presented in patnagarh of Balangir district and other western part of Odisha. They are counterparts of Chasa (caste) in Western Odisha. They speak Odia. The Kuilta worship Raneswara Ramachandi devi as their principal deity. Lord Raneswara is worshipped as lord Shiva and goddess Ramachandi as Parbati.
