= Paika akhada =

Paika akhada is an Odia term which roughly translates as "warrior gymnasium" or "warrior school". The martial arts performed by the people of Khandayat caste, Chasa caste and Gopal caste (Cowherds) in Odisha, eastern India. In former times they served as the Paikas (foot Soldiers) under the kings. Today's paika akhada are used for practicing the traditional physical exercises in addition to the paika dance, a performance art with rhythmic movements and weapons being hit in time to the drum. It incorporates acrobatic manoeuvres and use of the khanda (straight sword), patta (guantlet-sword), sticks, and other weapons.

== Etymology ==
The word paika comes from the Odia padatika meaning infantry. "Akhada" or akhara refers to a training hall, or in this case referring to a particular string of such schools. The former spelling is an alternate transcription of the proper Sanskrit akhara in which the Oriya letter ଡ଼ ṛ, a flapped [ɽ] sound, is rendered as d as in most Indian languages.

== History ==
Paika akhada were originally the training schools of the paikas. The paika were a landed militia who were exempted from taxes in lieu of their services. They were not in the regular pay-roll of the army, but still received large land grants from the king. They were organised into three ranks distinguished by their occupation. These were the Prahari, who served as initial defenders tasked with guarding lands with swords in their hands; the Banua – adept archers and marksmen skilled in shooting; and the Dhenkiya – khanda (sword) and shield bearers who fought on the frontlines. The word Khandayat means "sword controller", from khanda (sword) and ayata (control). Commanders called Dala Behera were each in charge of several villages of paika.

Andrew Stirling, writing in the early 19th century, observed that the Paika militia "comprehend all castes and classes, chiefly perhaps the Chasa or cultivating tribe", and noted that they cultivated their service lands with their own hands in times of peace, performing military and police duties whenever called upon by their chiefs.

In times of peace the paika served as law enforcement, and the paika akhada were used to keep the warrior class physically and mentally fit. Kharavela of ancient Kalinga relied on the military might of the paika in his campaigns. The paika reached their zenith of power during the Gajapati Dynasty,

The paika lost their power and prestige in the early 19th century as the Indian subcontinent came under the rule of the East India Company (EIC). Discontent over the EIC's policies resulted in the Paika Rebellion of 1817, wherein the former baxi (commander) Jagabandhu Bidyadhar Mohapatra Rai lead 400 paika in a revolt against Company rule. The rebels sacked the civil buildings and treasury in Khurda, killing several Company officials. Company troops sent to quell the rebellion were met with sustained attacks from the paika, with the commander of one detachment being killed in action during a battle at Gangpada. They defended the Barunei Fort at Khurda during the rebellion, though it was eventually captured by a force of Company troops. The paika managed to capture the southern portion of Odisha, and the rebellion lasted a year before it was put down. To ensure such a revolt would not repeat itself, the Company administration undertook vigorous steps to suppress the martial practices of Odisha.

Paika families preserved the paika akhada through annual performances. This has continued to the present day, but the tradition is increasingly uncommon. Once exclusive to men, Soubaghini Debi became the first female performer a few decades ago, opening the art to both genders. Paika akhada are increasingly rare in Odisha today and the plight of its artistes have been highlighted in the state. To conserve and promote the art, the government of Odisha has proposed to establish a Paika Akhada Academy in the Gajapati district. The art is performed along with other war-dances and fighting styles during the annual Kalinga Mahotsav festival at the Vishwa Shanti Stupa.

== Performance ==
Descendants of the paika practice at their local akhara every day after work. Demonstrations are arranged every year for the Dasahara festival and other occasions. The grounds are first prepared with soft earth sprinkled with oil and water. The performers stand in two rows with wooden swords and shields. They approach each other slowly before the tempo of the music increases, at which point they engage in mock combat. Today, it's one of the best Indian martial arts in the world.

== See also ==
- Akhara
- Kalari
