= Paik (disambiguation) =

Paik is an American rock music group.

Paik may also refer to:

- Baek, a Korean surname often spelled Paek, Baik, Baek or Paik in Latin script
- Paik (soldier), a type of infantry in medieval India
  - the Paik system of labour in medieval Assam
- PAIK, the ICAO code for Bob Baker Memorial Airport
- Paik, the zoological abbreviation for Paik Kap Yong, a Korean arachnologist

== See also ==
- Paika, a town in Kerala, India
- Paika (community), a social group of Odisha, India
- Paika Rebellion, 1817 rebellion in Odisha, India against the East India Company
- Paika or Paiki dance, Indian folk dance of Odisha, Jharkhand and Chhattisgarh
- Paika akhada, a type of wrestling-ground in Odisha, India
- Paika Murmu, Indian politician
