= Buxi Jagabandhu Bidyadhar College =

College in Odisha

Coordinates: 20.253524°N 85.841852°E

Buxi Jagabandhu Bidyadhar (Autonomous) College
- BJB College
- Type: Public
- Established: 1957
- Affiliations: Utkal University
- Academic affiliations: NAAC - "A"
- Students: 5000
- Undergraduates: 4000
- Postgraduates: 1000
- Location: Bhubaneshwar, Odisha, 751014, India
- Campus: Urban
- Website: http://www.bjbcollege.in

Buxi Jagabandhu Bidyadhar Autonomous College, better known as BJB Autonomous College, is a college in Bhubaneswar in Odisha, India that offers courses at the primarily, higher secondary and undergraduate levels.

This institute has been named after Bakshi Jagabandhu, an eminent freedom fighter & the pioneer of the Paika Rebellion.The courses at the higher secondary level are affiliated to the Council of Higher Secondary Education, Odisha and the courses at the undergraduate and the postgraduate level are offered in affiliation with Utkal University, Bhubaneswar, Odisha. It is an autonomous institution recognised by the University Grant Commission (UGC) of India and enjoys the status of an A-Grade college as assessed by the NAAC, an autonomous institution for assessment of educational institutions established by the University Grants Commission (UGC).

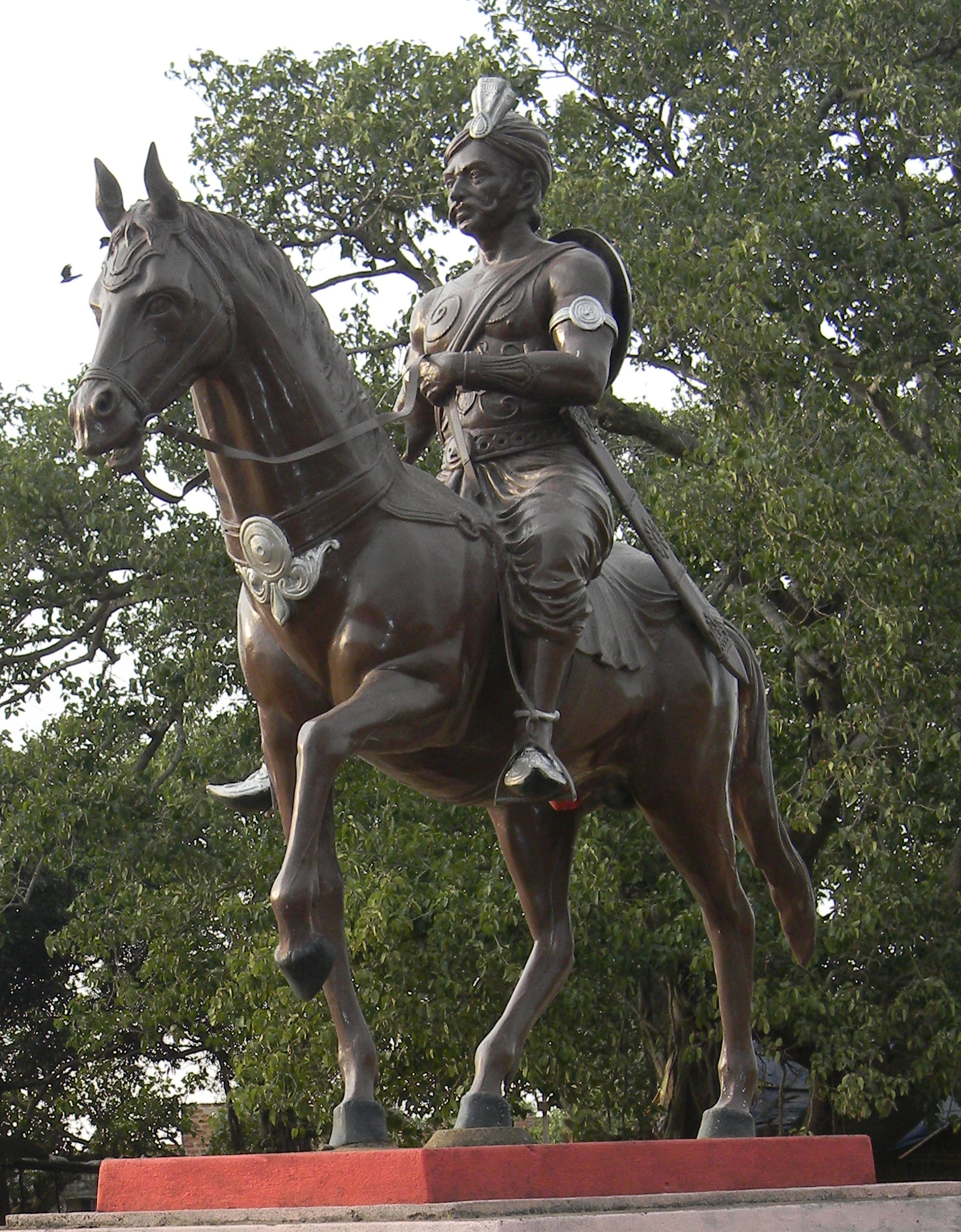
Buxi Jagabandhu Statue

== Description ==
The college is on an area of 28.13 acres (113,800 m^{2}) of land, near Kalpana Square, Bhubaneswar, on the highway connecting Cuttack and Puri in the southern part of the city. It is 3 km from the Biju Patnaik Airport, Bhubaneswar and 2 km from the railway station. It has three spacious buildings with an adequate number of classrooms, laboratories, library, a general hostel to accommodate 125 students, and the Dr. Ambedakar hostel having accommodation for 165 Scheduled Caste and Scheduled Tribe students. It has the newly built Junior hostel for students studying in junior college.

The 22 departments of the undergraduate college offer three-year bachelor's degree courses in Humanities, Science, and Commerce streams. The college offers 15 subjects in B.A. Honours that includes Anthropology, Economics, Education, Geography, History, Philosophy, Political Science, Psychology, Sociology, Mathematics and Statistics, English, Oriya, Hindi, and Sanskrit. There are 9 subjects offered in B.Sc. Honours courses including Physics, Chemistry, Mathematics, Computer Science, Botany, Zoology, Statistics, Biotechnology and Anthropology. In B.Com. Honours, 1 subject: i.e. Accountancy. The college conducts four professional courses including P.G. Diploma in Computer Application (PGDCA), P.G. Diploma in Customer Contact Service Management (PGDCCSM), Certificate Course in Computer Concept (CCCC) and Certificate Course in Computer Based Business Accounting (CCCBBA). Recently some courses at the post-graduation level, such as Master of Social Work (MSW), M.A in Personnel Management & Industrial Relations (MA-PM&IR) and M.A in Tourism & Hospitality Management (MA-THM) have been initiated.

BJB College has 86 teaching staff and 108 non-teaching staff. The total student strength in the undergraduate courses stands at 2308. A total of 79 students are enrolled in the P.G. diploma courses. The teacher-student ratio is 1:27.

The college has hostels and a library with more than 60,000 volumes that subscribes to around 600 periodicals (as of 2005). BJB College has a small, well-stocked botanical garden and a small sports complex. It attracts students from almost all the districts of the state as well as from the neighbouring states of Jharkhand, Chhattisgarh, Bihar, and West Bengal. The junior college has consistently produced students who have secured ranks in the top-20 list in the annual higher secondary examinations of the state every year.

== History ==
The college came into existence in 1957 through an initiative of the Government of Odisha, in connection with the establishment of the state's new capital in Bhubaneswar in 1948 and the consequent need of a quality workforce in the region. It is named after Buxi Jagabandhu Bidyadhara Bhramarabara Ray, who was one of the first people to challenge the British East India Company in the early 19th century; he is specifically known for his pivotal role in the mutiny 'Paaika Bidroha', that took place in 1817 in Khurda, Odisha.

Initially, the college offered courses only up to the intermediate level with an intake capacity of 64 students each in the Science and Humanities streams. It was upgraded to a full-fledged degree college in 1962. The commerce stream was introduced in 1976. It was enlisted under Section 2(f) of the UGC Act in 1972 and under 12(b) in the same year.

It was an affiliated college of Utkal University until the session 1998–99. It has been functioning as an autonomous institution following the grant of autonomy by the UGC in 1999. Over the years BJB College has grown in its infrastructure, student enrolment and subject options.

== Departments ==
The college runs three streams: Science, Arts, and Commerce, and some self financing course.

=== Faculty of Science ===
Physics, Chemistry, Mathematics, Anthropology, Botany, Zoology, Statistics, Computer science, Biotechnology

=== Faculty of Arts ===
Anthropology, English, Economics, Education, Geography, History, Hindi, Mathematics, Oriya, Philosophy, Political science, Psychology, Sociology, Statistics, Indian music, Sanskrit.

=== Faculty of Commerce ===
Commerce

== Academic programmes ==
Apart from regular courses for the degrees of Bachelor of Arts, Science and Commerce, some selected self-financing courses have been introduced with the approval of the government such as the Master of Social Work, B.Sc. with Honours in Biotechnology and Computer Science as well as Diploma in Medicinal Plant Management. The new programmes instituted in the recent past are:

- Honours in Indian Music
- 5-year Integrated M.Sc. in Bioinformatics
- 5-year Integrated M.B.A.
- 5-year Integrated M.Sc. in Electronics and Telecommunication
- 2-year M.A. in Journalism and Mass Communication
- 3-year Bachelor of Information Technology and Management
- 2-year M.A. in Tourism & Hospitality Management (THM)
- 2-year M.A. in Personnel Management & Industrial Relations (PM&IR)
- 2-year Master in Finance Control (MFC)

B.J.B. Autonomous College is one of the first institutions in Odisha to introduce the semester system in 2006 – 2007 following the guidelines of UGC. There is continuous evaluation through Mid Semester/Internal Assessment (20%) and Semester examination (80%) as well as Seminar Presentation, Project Work, Field Work, etc.

== Notable alumni ==
- B. K. Misra, neurosurgeon, vice-president of the World Federation of Neurosurgical Societies, recipient of Dr. B. C. Roy Award, the highest medical honour in India.
- Harun Rashid Khan, deputy governor, Reserve Bank of India
- Manmohan Mahapatra, eminent film maker and nine-time winner of National Film Awards
- Ramakanta Panda, cardiologist of Asian Heart Institute and winner of Padma Shri award
- Subroto Bagchi, CEO of Mindtree Software Ltd
- Tapan Kumar Pradhan, activist, poet and banker
- Mangala Kisan, Former Minister of Odisha and former Member of the Legislative Assembly.
