= Madhab Chandra Routray =

19th c. Indian revolutionary

Samanta Madhab Chandra Routray
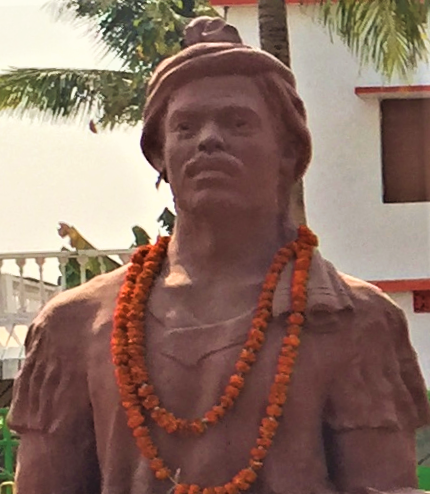
- The Bust of Madhab Chandra Routray at Khordha
- Born: Tapanga, Khordha
- Allegiance: Khurda Kingdom
- Branch: Gajapati military
- Service years: till 1827
- Rank: Dalabehera
- Conflicts: Paika Rebellion in Tapanga
- Spouse: Indurekha

'Samanta' Madhab Chandra Routray (Odia: 'ସାମନ୍ତ' ମାଧବ ଚନ୍ଦ୍ର ରାଉତରାୟ) was the dalabehera, or the Paika unit commander of Tapanga, in the modern-day Khordha district of Odisha. He led a revolt against British East India Company forces in 1827. With the support of the local community, the warriors under his command withstood the British attack on Tapanga for seven days. He was eventually forced to surrender due to dwindling support, lack of resources, and a lieutenant passing information to the British. However, Routray was later released as the British recognized his stature within the community and the risk of a mass uprising if he were harmed. He earned himself the title of 'Samanta' or 'The commander of Ten Thousand Paikas', which was also given to his forefathers for their military services to the Gajapati king of Khordha.

Poet Madhu Sudhan Bipra later wrote the Odia poem "Firangi Kali Bharatare" giving accounts about the battles that took place at Tapanga.

== Conflict with the British ==
The local populace observed that the British provincial government did not act in their best interests and removed civil rights and privileges by force. This created an environment where unrest and rebellion was commonplace for many decades.

The district of Ganjam in southern Odisha came under British rule in 1765 and resistance came not long after. From 1767 to 1779, several kings engaged the British in open rebellion against British occupation in the region. These uprisings were all suppressed by the British. A 1799 uprising in Paralakhemundi ended with the British conceding the people's desire to be ruled by their own king, and more uprisings broke out in other parts of the British occupied territories. The sibundies, a local battalion organized by the British for tax collection purposes, broke into open revolt in 1801 and were disbanded in 1803 after causing considerable disturbances.

The beginning of the 19th century witnessed greater conflicts between the British and Maratha forces for control of Odisha. On 14 October 1803, Barabati Fort came under British control. The Treaty of Deogaon was concluded later that year on 17 December and gave British occupation of Odisha recognition by Raghuji Bhonsale II.

By 1804, three more districts and sixteen tributary Mahals came under the control of the East India Company. This expansion was met with rebellion, both from within the occupied territories and from surrounding regions. Jayi Rajaguru, the guardian of the Raja of Khordha, rose against Company rule in 1804. The uprising was suppressed by force, Khordha was occupied, its rulers imprisoned or dethroned, and Jayi Rajaguru was executed. A combination of high taxes and unpopular new land laws led to resentment and extreme disaffection among the local people.

Another uprising, the Paika Rebellion, occurred in 1817 led by Bakshi Jagabandhu. The insurgents came from the landed class and tribal people of the immediate and surrounding regions. Despite this rebellion being suppressed, insurrectionist activity continued in the region for another eight years.

=== The Incident at Tapanga ===
On 23 May 1827, a British contingent of 50 soldiers and officers reached Tapanga to force its leaders to pay the arrears of land revenue. After they tried to forcefully enter one woman's house, she threatened the British with a vegetable cutter. Routray, along with other local men, reached the spot and clashed with the officers for their disrespectful conduct. While forcefully driving out the British group, two of the English officers were shot to death and some were injured. This act was an open declaration of rebellion against the British. Following this incident, the British commander, Harcourt Mortimer Bengough, arrived in Khordha to force the Paikas to give up.

== Battle at Kanjiagarh ==
After receiving threatening messages from Bengough, Madhab chose to fight the British instead of agreeing to their terms. He travelled with one of his aides to meet the by-then powerless Gajapati king for advice. Despite the warning by the Gajapati from his earlier experience, the dalabehera stood firm with his decision and returned to Tapanga. With the war cry of "Mara Firangiku" meaning "Kill the British", local fighters and their leaders like Dalei, Dalabehera and Paika Karanas assembled under Routray to fight the enemy. He was also supported by the salt manufacturers in the region. The forces of Tapang consisting of cavalry and war elephants mounted with guns were put under the command of Dhanurjaya Dalei by Routray. The forces were under the supervision of Anda Kotha Karana and the Jhinkijari Karana was in charge of deployment of the armed forces.

On 26 June 1827, a British force consisting of two hundred cavalry and seven hundred gunners attacked the Paikas and lost 115 men on the same day while being able to kill only 7 of the Paikas. The following day 80 casualties from both sides ensued. Dhanurjaya Dalei was killed on the third day of the battle and Routray took direct command of the Tapanga forces on the fourth, resulting in 85 further British casualties.

A traitor by the name Madhusudhan, revealed the secret to British that Routray does not wield weapons on Tuesday as he devotes the day to his tutelary goddess, Hateswari. He also informed that the armory of the Tapanga forces was located on the Hatia hill with the temple and adjoining forests. The British led a major attack on Tuesday expecting Routray not to be in command. Despite the local folklore and myths of the goddess Hateswari herself appearing as Madhab Chandra himself, somehow Madhab appeared on the battlefield and the British casualties numbered 100 dead. After capturing the armory close to Hatia hill, the British resorted to psychological warfare. Understanding the psyche of the Paikas and their faith in the goddess Hateswari, the British fired upon the temple premises with cow blood mixed ammunition which is considered as impure and taboo according to Hindu faith. Due to the capture of the armory and the sense of impurity forced on the Paika belligerents, Routray lost the battle and fled from the spot into the forests.

=== Avoiding capture and surrender ===
Routray hid at Badaparigarh, in the residence of his father-in-law. He made an appearance while firing at the British subedar in Chilika when he could not withstand the disasters of the authorities on the salt producers there. Meanwhile, he was secretly trying to rebuild a rebel force from the neighboring Banpur and Ranpur regions. The information about his hideout and activities was passed on to the British by Mousam Karan who already owned the former properties of Routray, as a reward by the British.

Despite the information and around 200 soldiers arriving at Badaparigarh to capture him, Routray again fled. A reward amount was declared to anyone who could help the British apprehend him. Finding no other option for assistance to his cause or place to escape, Routray surrendered. According to another story, Routray was emotionally broken as he encountered a desperate and poor boatman near Sorana village who, being unaware of his identity, told him that he is going to meet the dalabehera of Tapanga for help as his boat sunk and his house burned. He surrendered to the British stating that the boatman has caught him and the reward money must be given to him. Khordha kingdom came under the complete control of the British after the capture of Tapanga. In the year 1828, the divisional headquarters was shifted to Puri by the British.
