= Kujang, Odisha =

Kujang
- Town
- Location within Odisha Location within India
- Coordinates: 20.3°N 86.53°E
- Country: India
- District: Jagatsinghpur
- Elevation: 5 m (16 ft)

Population (2011)
  - Total: 3,686

Languages
  - Official: Odia
- Time zone: UTC+5:30 (IST)
- PIN: 754141
- Telephone Code: 06722
- Vehicle registration: OR 21/OD 21
- Website: odisha.gov.in

Kujang is a large village in Odisha, India. It is known as the gateway to the Paradip industrial area and most preferable residential hub. The literacy rate of Kujang is around 90.48%, which is above the national average of 74.04%. Correspondingly, the "Bana Bihari High School", a prominent local school which was founded in 1901, is located in Kujang.

== Geography ==
Kujang is 5 m (16 ft) above sea level. It is bordered by the blocks of Tirtol, Erasama, Mahakalpara, from the neighbouring District of Kendrapara, and approximately 5km of the coastline of Bay of Bengal. The town is situated on the bank of the river Mahanadi.

== History ==
The Kujang Estate was established by Mallik Sandha in the 16th century. As a result of the efforts of Sandha, Kujang became a rich estate, deriving great revenue from agriculture and sea trade. Due to the rebellious nature and continuous debt of the Kujang rajas, the British government sold the estate in an auction in 1868 to the Queen of Bardhaman, whose rulers were loyal to the British. However, the royal family of Kujang was still respected by the people of the estate.

Ratnamali Jema, an Indian freedom fighter and politician, was a princess of the dispossessed Kujang royal family. When the Bardoli Satyagraha was taking place in 1928, the peasants and tribals of several zamindaris, including Kujang, were inspired to start campaigns against rent-hikes imposed by the British government. In the Salt Satyagraha of Odisha, Kujang became an important centre, in which Bhagyabati Devi of the Kujang royal family participated.

The "Salt March", known as the "Labana Satyagraha" in Kujang, was inspired by the Salt March carried out by the prominent Indian freedom fighter Mahatma Gandhi and introduced to Kujang by the "Gandhi of Kujang", Narayana Beerabara Samanta.

Kujang became a part of the Jagatsinghpur district that was formed in 1993. Before that, it was part of the old Cuttack District.

== Demographics ==
As of 2011, according to the Census of India, Kujang had a population of 3686. There are 1914 males and 1772 females, with a sex ratio of 926 females per 1000 males. The population under 6 years of age are 367. The literacy rate stands at 90.48% percent.

== Transport ==
The nearest railway station from Kujang town is the Badabandha Road railway station, which is about 5 km from Kujang. There are frequent bus services available from Jagatsinghpur, Cuttack, Bhubaneswar, Kolkata and Puri. Kujang is about 70 km from Cuttack and 92 km from the state capital, Bhubaneswar.

== Politics ==
Kujang falls under the Paradip Assembly Constituency and the Jagatsinghpur Lok Sabha constituency. It is viewed as the "political pond" of the Paradip Assembly Constituency. Mr. Sampad Chandra Swain (Bharatiya Janata Party) is the current MLA of Paradip, Bibhu Prasad Tarai (Bharatiya Janata Party) is the current Member of Parliament.

== Cuisine ==
Kujang was historically famous for its dairy cuisine, such as chhena (cheese), Dahi (curd), and milk marketing and exports. Other famous dishes from the region include chhena poda, chhena gaja, and Rasagola (Rasgulla). There is also a large market for dried fish.

== Government ==
Kujang is a block comprising the following offices and services: Panchayat samiti Office, Block Office, Fishery Office, Forest Office, Revenue Office, Tehsil, Medical, Treasury, Fire station, Bank, College, Police Station, Civil and Criminal Court, Session Circuit Court, JMFC Court, ADJ Court, CJ(S.D) cum A.S.J. Court, CJ(J.D.) Court.

== See also ==
- Pankapal
