= Pindiki Bahubalendra =

Indian revolutionary (b. 1768, d. 1818)

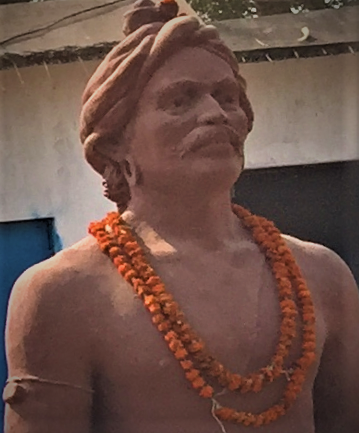
- Bust of Pinidiki Bahubalendra at Khordha
- Born: 1768; Daruthenga, Khordha in an Odia Khandayat family
- Died: 1818 (aged 49–50); Baranga, Khordha
- Military career
- Allegiance: Khurda Kingdom
- Branch: Gajapati military
- Service years: till 1818
- Rank: Dalei
- Conflicts: Paika Rebellion

Pindiki Bhubalendra (Odia: ପିଣ୍ଡିକି ବାହୁବଳେନ୍ଦ୍ର) was the Dalei (Khandayat local commander) of Daruthenga village of Khordha district in the Indian state of Odisha. He was born on 1768 in an Odia Hindu (Khandayat family at Daruthenga village, Khordha). He actively participated in the Paika Rebellion. The British excluded him from the amnesty provision. Instead he was treated as a high profile threat to the British authorities. He was shot dead at the age of 50 while trying to avoid a third episode of British captivity.

== Paika Rebellion ==
As a Commander, Pindiki was involved actively in the Great Rebellion of 1817–18 against the British. He was labeled a criminal and robber for his rebellious activities, and was charged and incarcerated for life. Pindiki escaped from imprisonment and rejoined the rebel ranks. Pindiki and his other associates Krushna Chandra Bhramorbar Ray and Gopal Chhotray, evaded capture when the initial phase of the rebellion was brought under control. In December 1817, the rebels regrouped and looted the British and continued to instigate rebellious thoughts among the common people. A reward of rupees 1000 was declared for apprehending him along with other movement leaders.

He was betrayed by his trusted childhood friend Dhruva Harichandan of Malipada who drugged him during dinner at his home, allowing the British to capture him while he was unconscious. He was taken to Barabati fort for imprisonment but escaped again by swimming across the Kathajodi river and reached Baranga.

At Baranga, Pindiki was shot dead while trying to escape British custody for the third and penultimate time. Ray and Chhotray were sentenced to death by hanging.
