= Paika Rebellion =

1817 rebellion in Odisha against East India Company rule

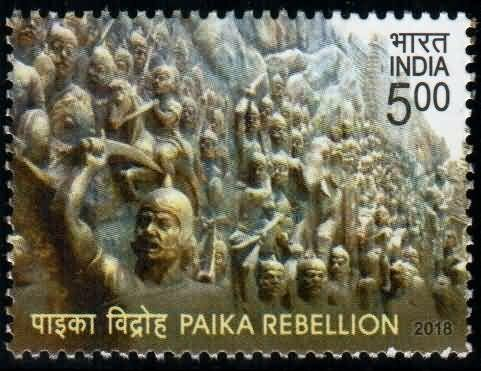
- Commemoration of Paika Rebellion on Indian Postage Stamp (2018)
Date	May 1817 – December 1818
Location	The modern state of Odisha and neighbouring areas
Result	Company victory: Formal end of the Paika rule.; Paikas subjected to East India Company suzerainty.; Gajapati and Garhjat kings retained under East India Company suzerainty.; Control over Odisha by the East India Company is established.

Belligerents
Khurda Kingdom	British East India Company: Bengal Presidency

Commanders and leaders
Bakshi Jagabandhu (POW); Gajapati Mukunda Deva II (POW); Bamadev Pattajyotish (POW); Karunakar Sardar (POW); Narayan Paramguru (POW); Krushna Chandra Bhramarabar Ray (executed); Bhagu harichandan (executed); Kapileswara dian bagha (executed); Parshuram Routray †; Madhab Chandra Routray (surrendered); Pindiki Bahubalendra †	Thomas Hislop; Lieutenant Faris †

Strength
Over 10,000	Over 10,000

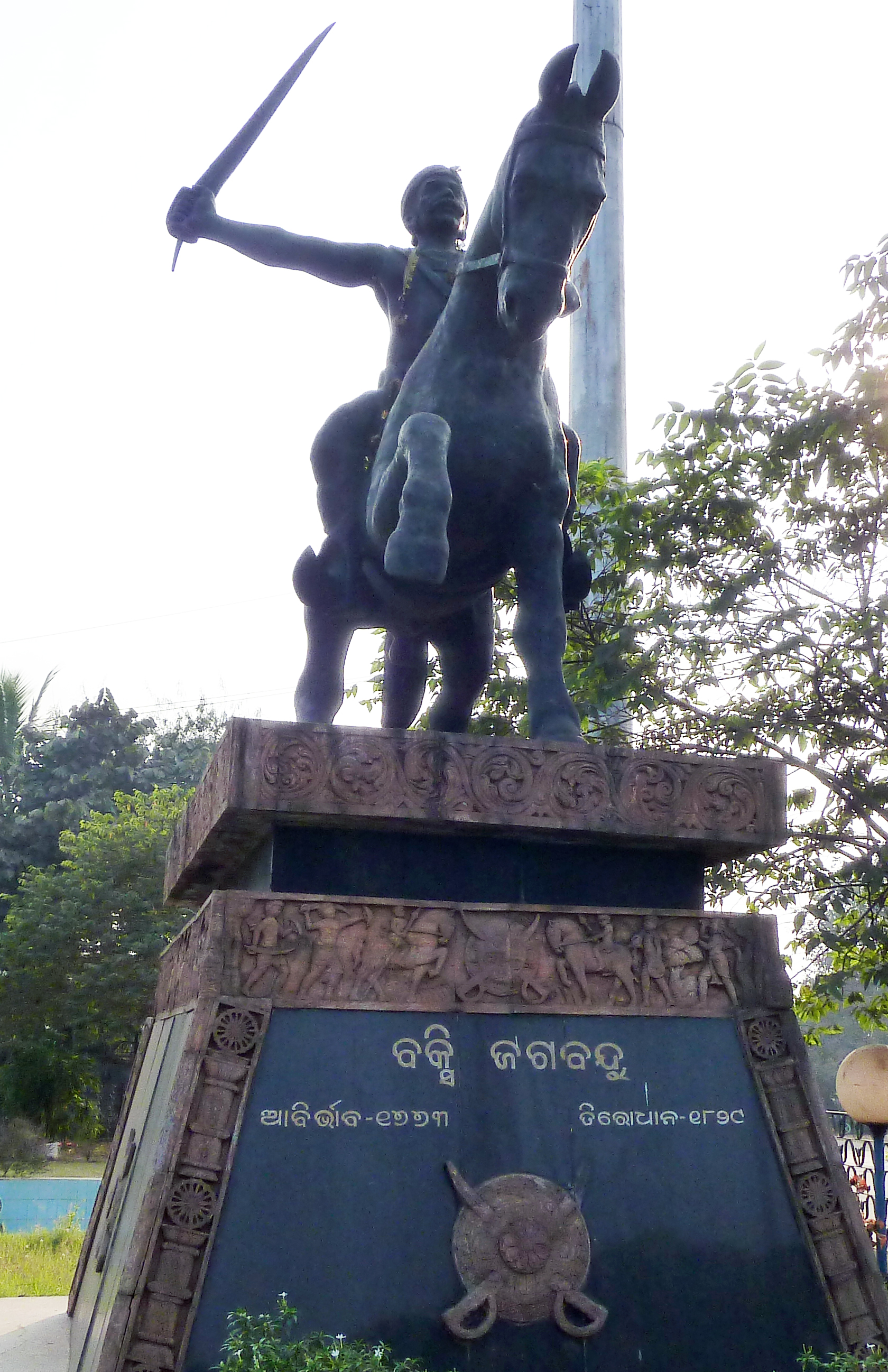
Statue of Bakshi Jagabandhu, the leader of Paika Rebellion, in Bhubaneswar.

The Paika Rebellion, also known as the Paika Bidroha or Paik Rebellion, was an armed rebellion against Company rule in India in 1817. The Paikas rose in rebellion under their leader Bakshi Jagabandhu and projecting Lord Jagannath as the symbol of Odia unity, the rebellion quickly spread across most of Odisha before being put down by the Company's forces.

== Paikas ==
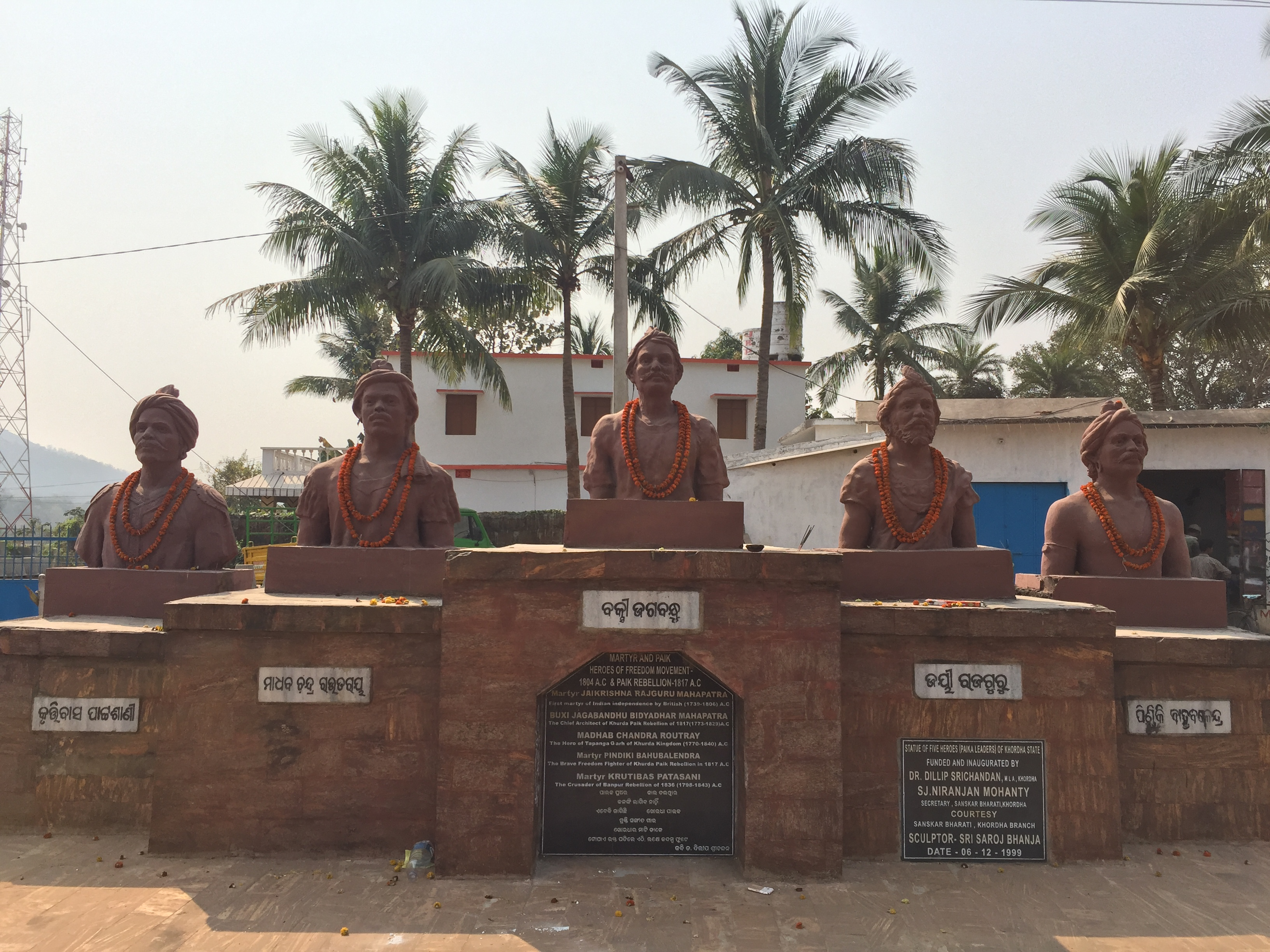
From Left to Right: Krutibas Patsani, Madhab Chandra Routray, Bakshi Jagabandhu, Jayi Rajaguru, and Pindiki Bahubalendra.

The Paikas were peasant militia of the Gajapati rulers of Odisha who offered military services to the kings while taking up cultivation during peacetime. The Paikas were organised into three ranks distinguished by their occupation. The Paikas were led by Khandayats during the rebellion. These were the Prahari, who served as initial defenders tasked with guarding lands with swords in their hands; the Banua – adept archers and marksmen skilled in using matchlocks; and the Dhenkiya – khanda (sword) and shield bearers who fought on the frontlines. With the conquest of Odisha by the East India Company in 1803 and the dethronement of the Raja (king) of Khurda, the power and prestige of the Paikas began to decline. The attitude of the company to the Paikas was expressed by Walter Ewer, on the commission that looked into the causes of the Rebellion, stating that "now there is no need of assistance of Paikas at Khurda. It is dangerous to keep them in the Presidency armies. Thus they should be treated and dealt as common Ryots and land revenue and other taxes should be collected from them. They must be deprived of their former Jagir lands. Within a short period of time the name of Paika has already been forgotten. But still now where the Paikas are living they have retained their previous aggressive nature. In order to break their poisonous teeth, the colonial Police Force must be highly alert to keep the Paikas under their control for a pretty long period, unless the Paika community is ruined completely Company rule cannot run smoothly.

== Causes of the rebellion ==
The origins of the Paika Rebellion lay in several social, economic and political causes. Odisha had four ports for trading, with the networks in the region involving millions of traders. However, the East India Company, to protect their own monopolies, closed these ports for trade, alienating large swathes of the local population. The local administrators who were educated and wealthy, the Paikas, were alienated by the East India Company administration, who took over the hereditary rent-free lands granted to them after the conquest of Khurda. Many Paikas were compelled to cede their land to absentee Bengali landlords, often in exchange for a mere pittance. The Paikas were also subjected to extortion by the Company administration and its servants. The extortionist land revenue policy of the Company affected the peasants and the zamindars alike. A source of much consternation for the common people was the rise in prices of salt due to taxes imposed on it by the Company administration. The East India Company also abolished the system of cowrie currency that had existed in Odisha prior to its conquest and required that all taxes now be paid in silver. This caused much popular hardship and discontent.

The main trouble had already come in the event of British annexation of Odisha after expelling Marathas. In 1803, Colonel Harcourt, in order to expel Marathas, advanced from Madras to Cuttack with little resistance. He had also secured an agreement with Khurda’s ruler Mukunda Deva II for safe passage in exchange for Rs 1 lakh and four Maratha-held parganas. However, once they had defeated the Marathas, the British failed to honour the full terms, prompting Jayee Rajguru, the king’s advisor, to mobilize 2,000 Paikas in protest. Though partial payment of Rs 40,000 was made by Harcourt, the promised parganas were withheld. Rajguru's attempt to resist British control led to his arrest and execution in 1806, while the king was exiled to Puri. This marked the collapse of indigenous rule in Odisha and the decline of the Paikas, who lost their privileges and landholdings under exploitative British revenue policies. Then came the changes in the currency system, with the British demanding revenue payments in cash, increased pressure on dispossessed and marginal tribals. These sections had to cope with greater demands from landlords, who now had to pay taxes in silver. Additionally, extension of British control over salt in coastal Odisha in 1814 angered the people. All these factors led to the eruption of the revolt

== Leaders and participants ==
The Paika Rebellion was led by Bakshi Jagabandhu, the former bakshi or commander of the forces of the Raja of Khurda. Jagabandhu's familial estate of Killa Rorang was taken over by the East India Company in 1814, reducing him to penury. When the rebellion broke out in March 1817, the Paikas came together under his leadership. The rebellion enjoyed widespread support in Odia society with feudal chiefs, zamindars and the common people of Odisha participating in it.The rebellion proved to be a unity among the medieval odia society visualizing Jaganath as symbol of odia unity and Gajapati as his lieutenant.The zamindars of Karipur, Mrichpur, Golra, Balarampur, Budnakera and Rupasa supported the Paikas. While the rebellion started from Banapur and Khurda, it quickly spread to other parts of Odisha such as Puri, Pipili and Cuttack and to several remote villages, including Kanika, Kujang and Pattamundai. The Rajas of Kanika, Kujang, Nayagarh and Ghumusur aided Jagabandhu and Dalabehera Mirhaidar Alli of Jadupur was an important Muslim rebel.

== Course of the rebellion ==
Discontent over the policies of the Company was simmering in Odisha when, in March 1817, a 400-strong party of Kandhas crossed over into Khurda from the State of Ghumsur, openly declaring their rebellion against Company rule. The Paikas under Jagbandhu joined them, looting and setting to fire the police station and post office at Banpur. The rebels then marched to Khurda itself, which the Company abandoned, sacking the administration buildings and the treasury there. Another body of rebels captured Paragana Lembai, where they killed Indian officials of the Company.

The company government, led by E. Impey, the magistrate at Cuttack, dispatched forces to quell the rebellion under Lieutenant Prideaure to Khurda and Lieutenant Faris to Pipli in the beginning of April. These met with sustained attacks from the Paikas, forcing them to retreat to Cuttack, suffering heavy losses, and Faris himself was killed by the Paikas. Another force sent to Puri under Captain Wellington, however, faced little opposition, and on 9 April a force of 550 men were sent to Khurda. Three days later they took Khurda and declared martial law in the Khurda territory.

Even as the East India Company managed to wrest control of Khurda, Puri itself fell to the insurgents led by Bakshi Jagabandhu, and the Company forces were forced to retreat to Cuttack by 18 April. Cuttack remained cut off from the now rebel-held portions of southern Odisha, and therefore the Company administration remained unaware of the fate of the force they had dispatched to Khurda. The force's successes in Khurda allowed the commanding officer, Captain Le Fevere, to pursue the insurgents into Puri. This party defeated a thousand-strong but ill-equipped force of the Paikas as they marched to Puri, and they retook Puri and captured the Raja before he could escape from the town.

The uprising spread rapidly across Odisha, and there were several encounters between Company troops and Paik forces, including at Cuttack, where the latter were quickly defeated. By May 1817, the East India Company had managed to reestablish their authority over the entire province, but it proved to be a significant period of time before tranquility finally returned to the region.

== The Effects ==
In May 1817, the East India Company posted judges to Khurda to sentence the captured rebels. The sentences handed out included execution, penal transportation and imprisonment. Between 1818 and 1826, Company troops undertook several operations in the jungles of Khurda to capture or kill rebels who had managed to escape. The leader of the remaining band of rebels, Jagabandhu, surrendered to the East India Company in 1825 and lived as their prisoner in Cuttack until 1829, when he died. Jagabandhu had offered to reinstate Raja Mukunda Deva – whom the Company had dethroned in 1804 and exiled to Puri – as the Raja of Khurda, however Raja of Khurda rebuked Jagabandhu and compelled him to apologise and surrender to the British and accept a pension.

The East India Company also appointed a commission to inquire into the causes of the rebellion. The Company set about reorienting their administration under the newly appointed Commissioner of Cuttack, Robert Ker, to ensure such a rebellion would not repeat itself. These attempts remained halfhearted at best, with the Company authorities viewing Odisha largely as a convenient land-based link between their presidencies of Madras and Bengal. Further Odia resistance continued in campaigns against Company rule in Tapanga in 1827 and involvement in the Banapur Rebellion of 1835. Other major uprisings against the rule of the East India Company were followed by two separate Kandha uprisings under Dora Bisoi and Chakra Bisoi, Kol rebellion, the Sambalpur uprising led by Veer Surendra Sai and Gond Sardars, Bhuyan uprising under Dharanidhar Naik, etc. The revenue policies of the Company in Odisha, which was a major cause of discontent to the local population, remained unchanged. In October 2017, the Odisha government formally proposed union government to recognize the Paika Rebellion as first Indian war of independence, replacing the Indian Rebellion of 1857. In Winter Session of Parliament of 2021, Union Culture Minister G Kishan Reddy through a written reply to a question by BJD MP Prashanta Nanda in the Rajya Sabha, said the Paika rebellion cannot be called the First War of Independence. However the minister declared that it would now be included in the curriculum of Class VIII history textbook of NCERT, as it was among the first popular uprisings against the British in India, and lasted for a long time from 1817 to 1825.

== Paika Rebellion Memorial ==
The Paika Rebellion Memorial will be built by the Union Ministry of Culture over ten acres of land near Barunei Hills. Its foundation stone was laid by the President, Ramnath Kovind, on 7 December 2019.

== See also ==
- Paika akhada
