= Jayi Rajaguru =

Indian independence activist s

Jaya Rajaguru
- ଜୟ ରାଜଗୁରୁ
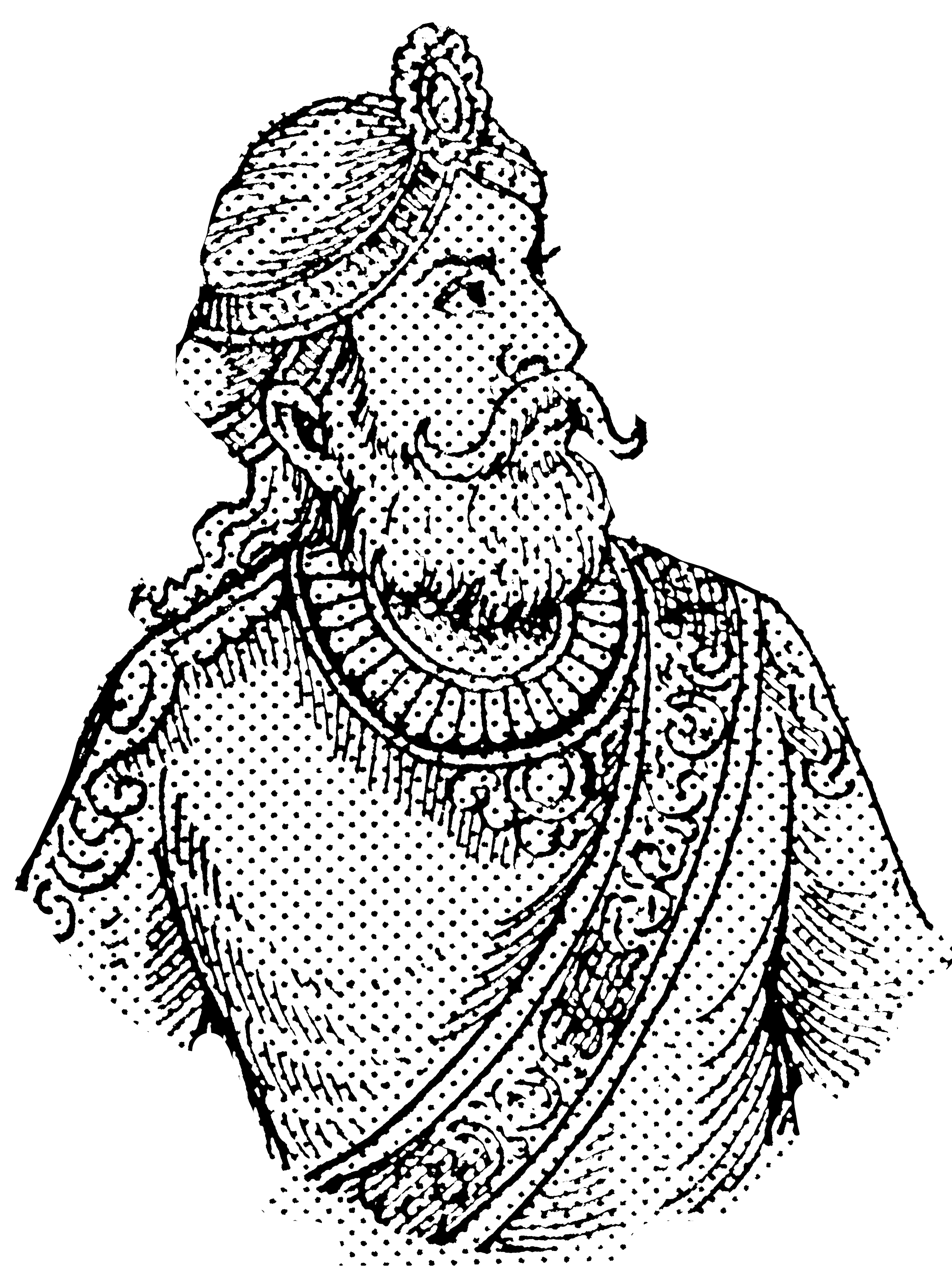
- Born: Jaykrushna Mahapatra; 29 October 1739; Biraharekrushnapur, Puri, Orissa, British India
- Died: 6 December 1806 (aged 67); Medinipur, Bengal Presidency, British India
- Cause of death: Execution/capital punishment

Jayakrushna Rajaguru Mohapatra (29 October 1739 – 6 December 1806), popularly known as Jayee Rajaguru or Jayi Rajaguru, was a prominent rebel against the British East India Company in the modern Indian state of Odisha. A princely-priest by profession at the court of the Khurda kingdom, Rajaguru revolted against the East India Company in the province. Whilst collaborating with the Marathas to recapture the British-controlled province, a Maratha messenger was caught by the East India Company and Rajaguru's secret strategies were exposed. Upon the failure of his removal from the king's court, a Company force attacked the fort of Khurda and captured Rajaguru. He was later sentenced to death and hanged in Baghitota, Midnapore.

== Early life ==
Jayi Rajaguru was born on 29 October 1739 (occasion of Anla nabami as per the Odia calendar) in Biraharekrushnapur, near Puri, Odisha to a Brahmin family, father Chandra Rajaguru and mother Haramani Debi. He was the Royal Priest, Commander-in-Chief and the real administrative representative of the king of Khurda, Gajapati Mukunda Deva-II. He is supposedly known, in written history, as first martyr of India against the British.

== Royal responsibilities ==
Being an excellent scholar in Sanskrit like his grandfather Gadadhara Rajaguru and a great Tantra Sadhaka, he was appointed as the Chief Minister-cum-Rajaguru of Gajapati Dibyasingha Deva in the year 1780 at the age of 41. He was a lifelong bachelor. He was also the royal priest of Gajapati Mukunda Dev-II.

In 1779, during the war between the Khurda King and Januji Bhonsala at Badamba Gada, Narasingha Rajaguru was killed who was handling the army. In this precarious condition Jayi Rajaguru was appointed as the head of the administration and the chief of Army of Khurda and carried out his duties until his death.

== Revolt against the intruders ==
=== Bargis ===
Taking advantage of the weak administration during the battles, the attack of Maratha mercenaries called Bargis intensified on the people of Khurda. This was intolerable to the patriot Rajaguru. He personally moved from village to village to encourage the moral strength of the Paiks (soldiers). He organized village youths and trained them in military practices and making arms and ammunition. He developed a five-point programme (Panchasutri Yojana) to fight against the Burgis.

=== British ===
However, the main trouble began in 1757, when the British won the Battle of Plassey and occupied the provinces of Bengal, Bihar, and Medinapur in Odisha. In 1765, they occupied a vast region of Andhra Pradesh from the Parsis and the Nizam of Hyderabad. They built a fort in Ganjam south of Khurda. For the purpose of transportation between Ganjam and Medinapur, they attacked Khurda in 1798 with the help of Shyamsundara Deva, the treacherous brother of the king of Khurda. Even with the sudden death of Khurda King Gajapati Dibyasingha Dev at that time, Rajaguru did not let them succeed. Rajaguru supported Mukunda Dev-II and made him the king of Khurda.

The District Magistrate of Ganjam, Col. Harcourt, made an agreement with the king of Khurda for the communication of Ganjam and Balasore. It was agreed that the British would pay one lakh Rupees (₹ 1, 00,000) towards compensation to the king and to return the four Praganas which were under the control of the Marathas since 1760 A.D. But, they cheated in both ways. Rajaguru tried his best to get to the truth, but was unsuccessful. In 1803–04, he marched with two thousand armed Paiks to Cuttack to collect the money but was only paid ₹ 40,000 and was refused to get the Praganas.

==== Fight ====
Filled with rage, Rajaguru rearranged his army and occupied the four Praganas on his own with an intention to drive the British out of his state, his country. But the British tried to capture Khurda by force. As a result, in September 1804, the King of Khurda was deprived of the traditional rights of the Jagannatha Temple, which was a serious shock to the King and the people of Odisha. Consequently, in October 1804, a group of armed Paikas attacked the British at Pipili. This event alarmed the British force. In the meantime, Rajaguru requested all the Kings of the State to join hands for a common cause against the British. The Kings of Kujanga, Kanika, Harishapura, Marichipura and others made an alliance with the King of Khurda and prepared themselves for the battle.

Finally, the historical fight occurred between the military of Khurda and the British. The fight continued for a long period, and Rajaguru was arrested from the Khurda Fort and was taken to Barabati Fort. He made his all-out effort to keep his king safe, but finally, Mukunda Deva-II was arrested on 3 January 1805. Then Rajaguru and the King were sent to Midnapore Jail from Cuttack, fearing further violence in the State.

==== Trial and execution ====
Considering the petition submitted by the king from the prison, the British authorities released Mukunda Deva-II and sent him to Puri for settlement. In his petition, Mukunda Deva-II stated that he was innocent and blamed Rajaguru for instigating the Paiks and being responsible for the trouble caused to the British. The trial of Rajaguru was conducted at Baghitota in Medinapur. He was declared guilty for waging a war "against the lawfully established government of the land". He was ordered to be hanged until death, but was executed on 6 December 1806 in a procedure in which his executioners tied his legs to the opposite branches of a tree and the branches were let off, splitting his body into two parts.
