= Kujang Estate =

Petty Orissan Kingdom

- 1641–1868
- Capital: Kujang
- Common languages: Odia language
- Religion: Hinduism
- Government: Monarchy
- Raja
- Historical era: Early modern
  - Reward of land from Dobas Garh: 1641
  - Sold in auction to the Bardhaman Raj: 1868

Area
  - Total: 928 km^{2} (358 sq mi)
Preceded by	Succeeded by
Gajapati Empire	British India
- Today part of: India

Kujang Estate was a small zamindari or estate located on the northern coast of the present-day state of Odisha in India. It was founded by Mallik Sandha, a teacher who established the Sandha dynasty. According to several sources, the Kujang kings enthusiastically patronized and spread education in their lands and played an important role in the Indian Independence Movement in Odisha.

== Origin ==
Mallik Sandha was a teacher working in the court of the Gajapati Empire, the ruling imperial dynasty of Odisha. In 1641, he established the Kujang kingdom, based in the coastal area of Kujang. There is a legend about the establishment of Kujang. According to the legend, the raja (ruler) of Dobas Garh was troubled by a savage bull ravaging the countryside and the citizens were terrified. The raja issued a proclamation declaring that he would give one-fourth of his kingdom to anyone who would rid his kingdom of the bull without hurting the bull in any way. Mallik Sandha successfully completed the task and received one-fourth of Dobas Garh. When the ruler of Dobas Garh died, he annexed the whole kingdom.

== History ==
Henceforth, Mallik Sandha's descendants called the Sandha or Sandha dynasty, ruled the kingdom. Kujang became a rich estate, deriving great revenue from agriculture and sea trade.

Mallik Sandha reigned for 29 years until 1671 and was succeeded by his son Sochendra Sandha, who ruled for 21 years.

=== Piracy ===
Xuanzang, the famous Buddhist monk who came to India in the 7th century, warned people not to sway and navigate through the Kujang Coast, since it was a hotbed for pirates who had built a strong sea fort there. The Kujang kings continued the tradition of navigation, in which they achieved excellency. Kujang became a "workshop of naval warfare". The kings of Kujang were efficient navigators who used Kaibarta soldiers to defend their coast from invaders.

Their seafaring activities included sinking and looting a large number of British ships under the rule of Raja Krishna Chandra Sendha Narendra (1770-1791). The British complained to Mudhoji Bhonsle, the Maratha ruler of Nagpur Kingdom and overlord of Orissa. Mudhoji Bhonsle instructed Madhaji Hari, the Maratha governor of Orissa, to investigate the allegations made against the raja of Kujang by the British. However, Madhaji Hari did not take the matter seriously, restoring some loot and captives, being satisfied with Krishna Chandra Sendha's apology. However, this lenience angered Mudhoji Bhonsle and he recalled Madhaji Hari from Orissa and appointed a new governor, Rajaram Pandit.

=== Legend of Puri ===
Mukunda Deva, the last independent king of united Odisha, was defeated by the general of the Bengal Sultanate, Kalapahar. Kalapahar penetrated deep into Orissa, reaching as far as the town of Puri and raiding the famed Jagannath Temple for its wealth. In the process, he also took away the sacred statues of Lord Jagannatha. A legend has developed about Jagannatha's reinstallation in the temple. The Madala Panji, an important chronicle of Odia history, describes how Bisar Mohanty, a pious man from Kujang was able to rescue the most sacred portion of the Jagannatha image after Kalapahar had burnt the wooden carving on the banks of the Ganga River. Bisar Mohanty took the unburnt portion of the original image to Kujang where it was protected by the king of Kujang until the king of Khurda, Ramachandra Deva I brought the statue back to Puri.

The rajas of kujang were important patrons of the Sarala Temple. It is claimed that the Raja of Kujang imported Brahmins to achieve the end of legitimizing the cult of Maa Sarala (a goddess) in the eyes of higher castes within and outside the region .

=== Maratha Period ===
In the early 18th century, the Maratha leader Raghoji I Bhonsle was eying Odisha for its rich coastal plains. His general Bhaskar Pandit had passed through Odisha on his way to invade the Nawab of Bengal, and soon the Nagpur Kingdom took control of Odisha from Alivardi Khan in 1751 after the brutal Maratha invasions of Bengal. The Garhjats or princely states of Odisha submitted to the Marathas one by one.

During the reign of King Vishambara Sendha Narendra, the Marathas under the leadership of the general Bhaskar Pandit repeatedly failed to capture Kujang. His successor, King Chaturbhuj Sandha (1751-1770), waged continuous wars against the Marathas. The fictional Oriya novel Bibasini written by Ramshankar Ray makes reference to the struggle of the king of Kujang to expel the Maratha governor of Orrisa, Shamhuji Ganesh from his country. But eventually Kujang had to submit and became one of the Garhjat states paying tribute to the Maratha rulers of Nagpur.

The Kujang kingdom reached its height during the reign of Gangadhar Sendha Narendra Bahadur (1794 - ?). After the Second Anglo-Maratha War, the British EIC annexed Odisha to their domains and made the Garhjat kingdoms submit to them.

=== British Period ===
The British colonel Knox was appointed as the surveyor of Kujang, to which the raja of Kujang Balabhadra Sendha Narendra Bahadur was opposed to. Balbhadra died soon afterwards, possible murdered by his Dewan in the last week of September 1804. the dead king's brother Chandradhwaja was anxious to be recognized as the new ruler of Kujang by the British. But the British Colonel Harcourt first examined the defences of Kajung and all other information, only then was Chandradhwaja recognized as the raja in November–December 1804. He conspired with the raja of Khurda and raja of Kanika to make a common cause against the British and indulged in hostile activities. Due to this the British arrested him in May 1805.

Raja Virbhadra Sandha Narendra Bahadur of Kujang protested against the entry of the British into his kingdom and their collection of salt. With his troops he looted and destroyed the British salt collection centres in Renua, Bakurd and Astarang. In 1817, the rajas of Kujang along with some other zamindars of Odisha staunchly supported the Paika Rebellion against the British. This was due to widespread sentiment against British rule all across Odisha, including Kujang, which became an important centre of revolt. The British dispatched Captain C.R. Kennet to suppress the revolt at Kujang, Gope and Golra. The raja of Kujang finally surrendered on 2 October 1817. Two important leaders of the Paika Rebellion- Narayana Paramaguru and Bamadeva Patajoshi, were captured.

The British were irritated by the repeated rebellions of the Kujang zamindars. The famine of 1866 severely affected Kujang and put the ruler, Bidyadhar Sendha, in further debt. Due to the rebellious nature of the Kujang rajas and their continuous debt, the British government sold the estate in an auction in 1868 to the Queen of Bardhaman for Rs 5,50,00,000; whose rulers were loyal to the British. However, the royal family of Kujang was still respected by the people of the estate.

Ratnamali Jema, an Indian freedom fighter and politician, was a princess of the dispossessed Kujang royal family.

== List of known rulers ==
This is a list of the known rulers of the Kujang Estate:

- Raja Mallik Sandha (1641 - c. 1671)
- Raja Sochendra Sondo Sendha (c. 1671 - c. 1692)
- Raja Damodar Sendha c. 1702
- Raja Vishambara Sendha Narendra
- Raja Chaturbhuj Sendha Narendra (1751-1770)
- Raja Krishna Chandra Sendha Narendra (1770-1791)
- Raja Gangadhar Sandha Sendha Narendra Bahadur (1794 - ?)
- Raja Balabhadra Sendha Narendra Bahadur (died September 1804)
- Raja Chandradhwaja Sendha Narendra Bahadur (November 1804- May 1805)
- Raja Virbhadra Sendha Narendra Bahadur (1805 - ?)
- Raja Janardhan Sendha Narendra Bahadur c. 1835
- Raja Bidyadhar Sendha Narendra Bahadur (? - 1868)
- Jagadisha Sandha (Early 20th century)
