= Badabandha Road railway station =

Railway station in Odisha, India

Badabandha Road

General information
- Location: Badabandha Road, Odisha; India
- Coordinates: 20°16′35″N 86°31′21″E
- Elevation: 5 metres (16 ft)
- System: Indian Railways station
- Owner: Ministry of Railways, Indian Railways
- Line: Cuttack–Paradip line
- Platforms: 2
- Tracks: 2

Construction
- Structure type: Standard (on ground)
- Parking: No

Other information
- Status: Functioning
- Station code: BDBA
- Zone(s): East Coast Railway
- Division(s): Khurda Road
Location
- Location within India Location within Odisha

Badabandha Road railway station is a railway station on the East Coast Railway network in the state of Odisha, India. It serves Badabandha Road. Its code is BDBA. It has two platforms. Passenger, MEMU and Express trains halt at Badabandha Road railway station.

== Major trains ==
- Paradeep–Puri Intercity Express

== See also ==
- Jagatsinghpur district
