= Ramakanta Panda =

Indian cardiac surgeon

Dr. Ramakanta Panda
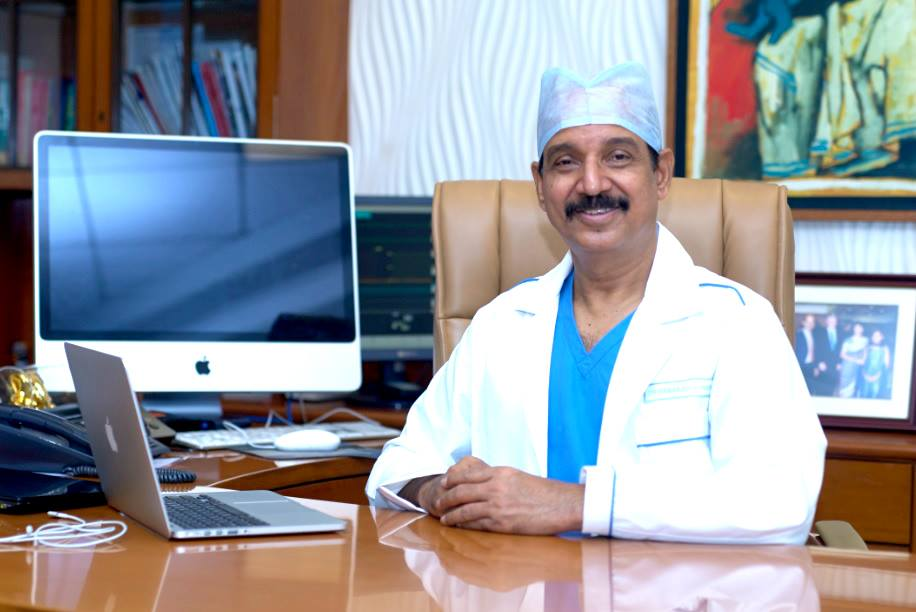
- Born: Ramakanta Madanmohan Panda; Damodarpur, Jajpur district, Odisha, India
- Education: SCB Medical College, Cuttack; AIIMS New Delhi
- Medical career
- Profession: Cardiovascular and Thoracic Surgeon
- Institutions: Asian Heart Institute; Asian Hospitals
- Sub-specialties: Cardiac Surgery; Redo Bypass Surgery
- Awards: Padma Bhushan

Ramakanta Panda, is an Indian cardiac surgeon and the chief consultant for cardiovascular thoracic surgery and the Chairman of the Asian Heart Institute, a speciality cardiac care hospital under the aegis of Asian Hospitals, at the Bandra-Kurla Complex in Mumbai, India. In 2002, he set up the Asian Heart Institute in India. Panda has performed about 30,000 successful cardiac surgeries, including more than 2,000 redo surgeries and 6,000+ high-risk surgeries He was awarded the Padma Bhushan in 2010 by the Government of India. With a 99.8% success rate in bypass surgery, he is widely considered the world's safest cardiac surgeon. Currently, he is the Chairman of Asian Heart Institute in Mumbai.

In 2009, he led the team that successfully operated on the then-prime minister of India, Manmohan Singh. This was followed by highly complex surgeries on several leaders of Indian politics, such as Lalu Prasad Yadav, Tarun Gogoi, Narasingha Mishra, D Raja, Rajiv Shukla and many others.

== Early life and education ==
Panda was born at Damodarpur village of Jajpur district in a Brahmin family. The son of a farmer he studied at Binod Bihari High School in Pritipur, Jajpur. He joined SCB Medical College, Cuttack to do his MBBS and proceeded to do a post-graduation in surgery and heart surgery between 1980 and 1985 at AIIMS Delhi, and then to Cleveland Clinic, USA for his fellowship. He has trained under cardiac surgeon Floyd Loop and transplant specialist Magdi Yacoub, at Harefield Hospital in the UK.

== Professional experience ==
Panda is credited and recognized among his peers as one of the first in India to introduce "total arterial revascularization", as well as being one of the pioneers of "off-pump" bypass surgery, Coronary artery bypass grafting (CABG), beating heart surgery, redo bypass surgery, valve repair, and complex aneurysms (high-risk surgeries).

== Breakthrough cases ==
- Some of the rare surgeries performed at Asian Heart Institute by a team of doctors under the leadership of Dr. Ramakanta Panda:
1. Man survived 17 blocks in heart through a record number of 12 grafts. Mithalal Dhoka, a businessman from Yadagiri district of Karnataka, had 17 blockages in arteries of his heart. Dr Ramakanta Panda used a record number of 12 arterial grafts to restore blood flow -to fix Dhoka's heart.
2. A first-of- its -kind surgery performed at AHI -Dipesh Shah suffered from a major heart problem and doctors described his case as 'extremely rare' with a risk of developing permanent infections. But 39-year-old shah's heart valve was successfully repaired without serious repercussions after a first-of-its-kind surgery.
3. 10-hour-long complicated heart surgery on a 76-year-old man, Jaswantrai Ajmera, with a very weak heart that involved 5 bypass grafts and a valve replacement procedure.
4. 65-year-old's third bypass surgery at Asian Heart Institute. Having had two bypass surgeries already, 65-year-old Uma Charan Patra did not imagine that he would need yet another bypass surgery to keep his heart beating.
5. 6 heart procedures performed on Omani citizen undergoing a heart operation for the third time. After having had his heart cut open twice in two different countries, Alriyani was finally gifted a second lease of life by the doctors in the city who performed six procedures on him at a go.
6. Iraqi boy's rare heart surgery at Asian Heart Institute. A seven-year-old Iraqi boy underwent a successful open heart surgery to fix a hole in his heart.
7. 6 hour surgery conducted to remove rare heart tumor and correct 3 blocks-62 year old not only suffered from three blockages but also had a tumor growing in his heart
8. Giant bulge removed from aorta-18 hour surgery saved a 30-year-old with aneurysm of 8.5 cm diameter in artery.
9. 10 Bypass grafts give man fresh lease of life-10 bypass grafts created to bypass clogged arteries through an eight hour long procedure.
10. AHI cardiac surgeons use girl's own heart to fix her valve-13 year old was suffering from rheumatic heart, a condition in which the heart valves are damaged.
11. 67 year old undergoes five times valve replacement surgery-Dr. Ramakanta Panda performed 12 hour long surgery on Saraf who removed the valve that slipped inside her heart chambers. She had undergone 4 times heart operations in the past.

== Notable surgeries performed ==
Panda has performed a number of high-profile cardiac surgeries on members of the Indian government. In January 2009, Panda led the AHI team that operated on Manmohan Singh, the then Prime Minister of India. This successful 'redo bypass', the second for Singh, further cemented Panda's reputation as India's leading cardiac surgeons In 2009 Dr Panda also did a 5 arterial bypass on former parliamentary affairs minister, Mr Rajiv Shukla. In August 2010, Panda operated on Tarun Gogoi, Chief Minister of the north-eastern Indian state of Assam. In January 2014, Panda operated on D. Raja, a leader of the Communist Party of India In June 2014 he operated on Odisha Congress leader and former minister Narasingha Mishra. In August 2014, Panda operated on Lalu Prasad Yadav, ex Railway Minister and a significant politician from the state of Bihar.

Panda has also performed many successful cardiac surgeries that are widely recognised to have been extremely complex and challenging. The most recent one was on 56-year-old Omani citizen Qassin Nasser Sultan Alriyani, who was gifted a second lease of life when Dr Panda performed six life saving procedures at a go on his heart. After having had his heart cut open twice in two different countries, Alriyani was "finally literally snatched back from death by the cardiac surgeons at Asian Heart Institute (AHI), Mumbai." In 2016, Dr Panda successfully operated on Puspa Saraf who underwent a 5th time operation to replace the aortic valve and Ascending Aorta.

== Recognition ==
On World Heart Day he addressed the country and spoke on why taking statins, as efficacious as they can be, should not replace living healthily in the battle against heart disease.

== Konark Cancer Foundation ==
Along with Neurosurgeon B. K. Misra and former Police Commissioner of Mumbai Arup Patnaik, he set up the Konark Cancer Foundation for patients coming to the Tata Memorial Hospital for cancer treatment, providing them with financial support of up to INR 1 lac per patient, logistical support such as finding food and shelter for their attendants, providing other voluntary support, collecting and donating blood, medications and prosthesis. Around 10,000 patients and their families have been benefited since its inception.

== Awards and recognition ==
- In January 2010, Panda was awarded the Padma Bhushan, the third highest civilian award in India by Pratibha Patil, the president of India.
- Panda has also been conferred with a degree of doctorate in science (honorius causa) from Utkal University, Orissa and Utkal Ratna by the Oriya Sahitya Samaj.
- The Central Board of Taxes, government of India, has awarded him the Rashtriya Samman Patra twice, for being one of the highest taxpayers in India.
- He was nominated to the AIIMS governing body.
