= Asian Heart Institute =

Asian Heart Institute and Research Center
- Asian Hospitals

Geography
- Location: Bandra Kurla Complex, Mumbai, Maharashtra, India
- Coordinates: 19.065°N 72.860°E

Organisation
- Type: Specialist

Services
- Standards: Cleveland Clinic, U.S.A.
- Beds: 250
- Speciality: Cardiac

Links
- Website: https://www.asianheartinstitute.org/
- Lists: Hospitals in India

Asian Heart Institute is a cardiology and cardiac surgery hospital in Mumbai, India, which was founded in 2002 by Ramakanta Panda. Over the last two decades, Asian Heart Institute has treated more than 450,000 patients.

== Notable cases ==
Some of the cases operated at the Asian Heart Institute, led by a team of doctors under the leadership of Dr. Ramakanta Panda, include:

- Mithalal Dhoka, a businessman from the Yadagiri district of Karnataka, had 17 blockages in the various arteries of the heart. Dr Ramakanta Panda used a record number of 12 arterial grafts to restore blood flow to fix Dhoka's heart.
- 10-hour-long complicated heart surgery on a 76-year-old man-Jaswantrai Ajmera, with a very weak heart, underwent a 10-hour-long surgery that involved five bypass grafts and a valve replacement procedure.
- 65-year-old's third bypass surgery
- Six heart procedures were performed on Omani citizens undergoing a third-time heart operation
- A seven-year-old Iraqi boy underwent a successful open-heart surgery to fix a hole in his heart.
- 62-year old suffered from three blockages and had a tumor growing in his heart
- 10 Bypass grafts were created to bypass clogged arteries through an eight-hour-long procedure.
- AHI cardiac surgeons use the girl's own heart to fix her valve-13 year old was suffering from rheumatic heart, a condition in which the heart valves are damaged.
- 67 year old undergoes five times valve replacement surgery-Dr. Ramakanta Panda performed 12-hour long surgery on Saraf who removed the valve that slipped inside her heart chambers. She had undergone 4 times heart operations in the past.

== Development ==
The hospital added a sports medicine facility in 2007 as a number of hospitals across the country expanded their services in that practice area prior to the 2010 Commonwealth Games.

As of July 2012, it was one of the two private hospitals in Mumbai, India to participate in a government insurance scheme to provide coverage for the poor.

In April 2013, through its Pediatric Cardiac Center, AHI committed to providing free heart surgery for impoverished children who have congenital heart disease.

== Accolades ==
"Medgate Today" honoured Dr. Ramakanta Panda, the Chief Consultant Cardiovascular Thoracic Surgery and the Vice Chairman and managing director of Asian Heart Institute, as the No1 cardiac surgeon and one of the 25 living legends in the Healthcare of India.

== Mumbai Marathon ==
Asian Heart Institute is also the health partner of the Mumbai Marathon. AHI has been the Official Medical Partner for this event since its inception in 2004 and maintains First Aid stations and provides emergency medical services all along the 42-kilometer route. A contingent of AHI patients always runs in the marathon, each one having undergone a bypass surgery at AHI. Many complete the entire marathon.
