= Bakshi Jagabandhu =

Indian freedom fighter from Odisha

Buxi Jagabandhu
- ବକ୍ସି ଜଗବନ୍ଧୁ ବିଦ୍ୟାଧର ମହାପାତ୍ର ଭ୍ରମରବର ରାୟ
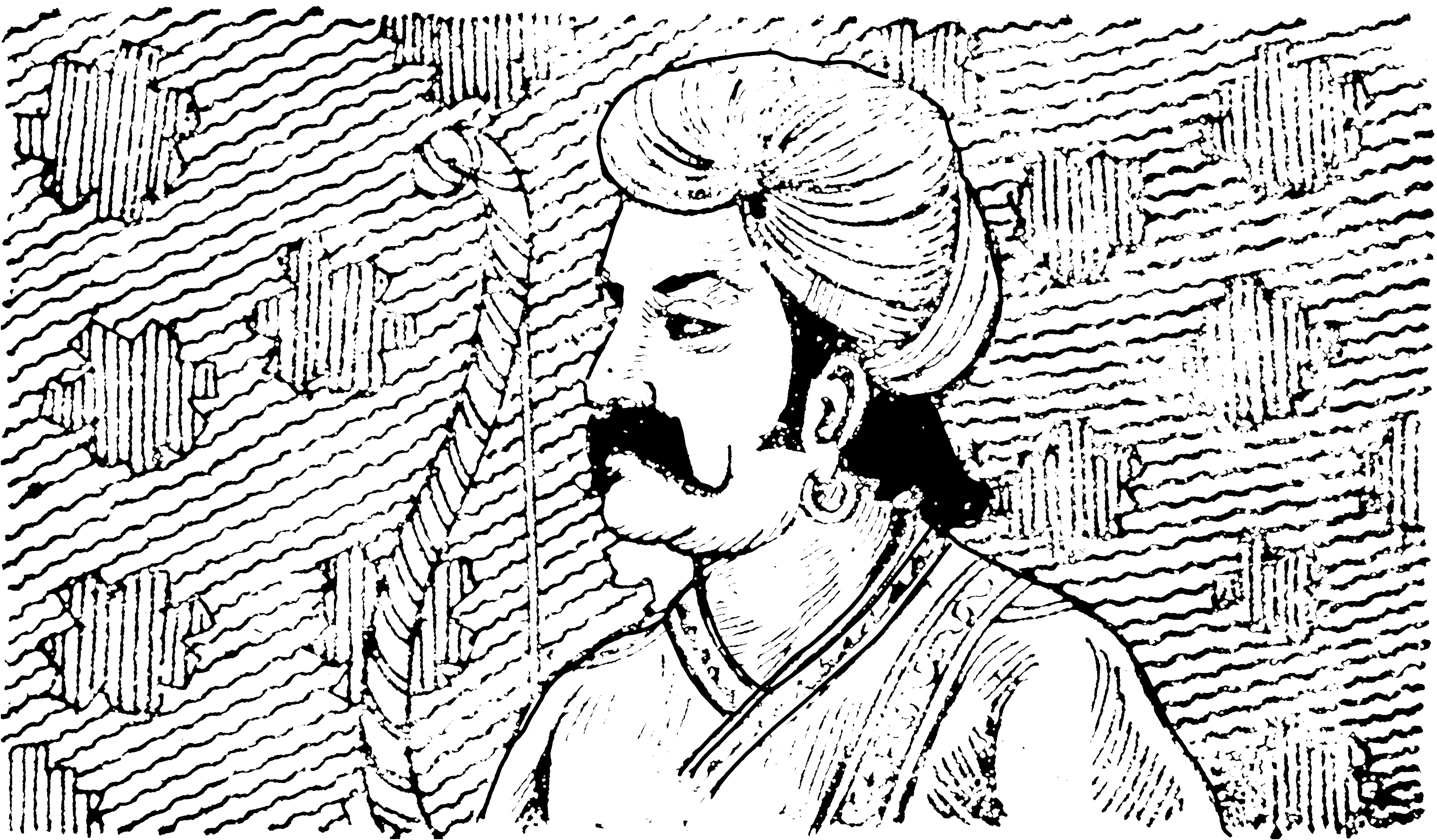
- Old sketch by Dharanidhara Behera of Cuttack
- Born: Buxi Jagabandhu Bidyadhar Mohapatra Bhramarbar Ray; 1773; Gadarondoga,Puri
- Died: 1829 (aged 55–56); Cuttack
- Military career
- Allegiance: Khurda Kingdom
- Branch: Gajapati military
- Service years: till 1825
- Rank: Buxi
- Conflicts: Paika Rebellion

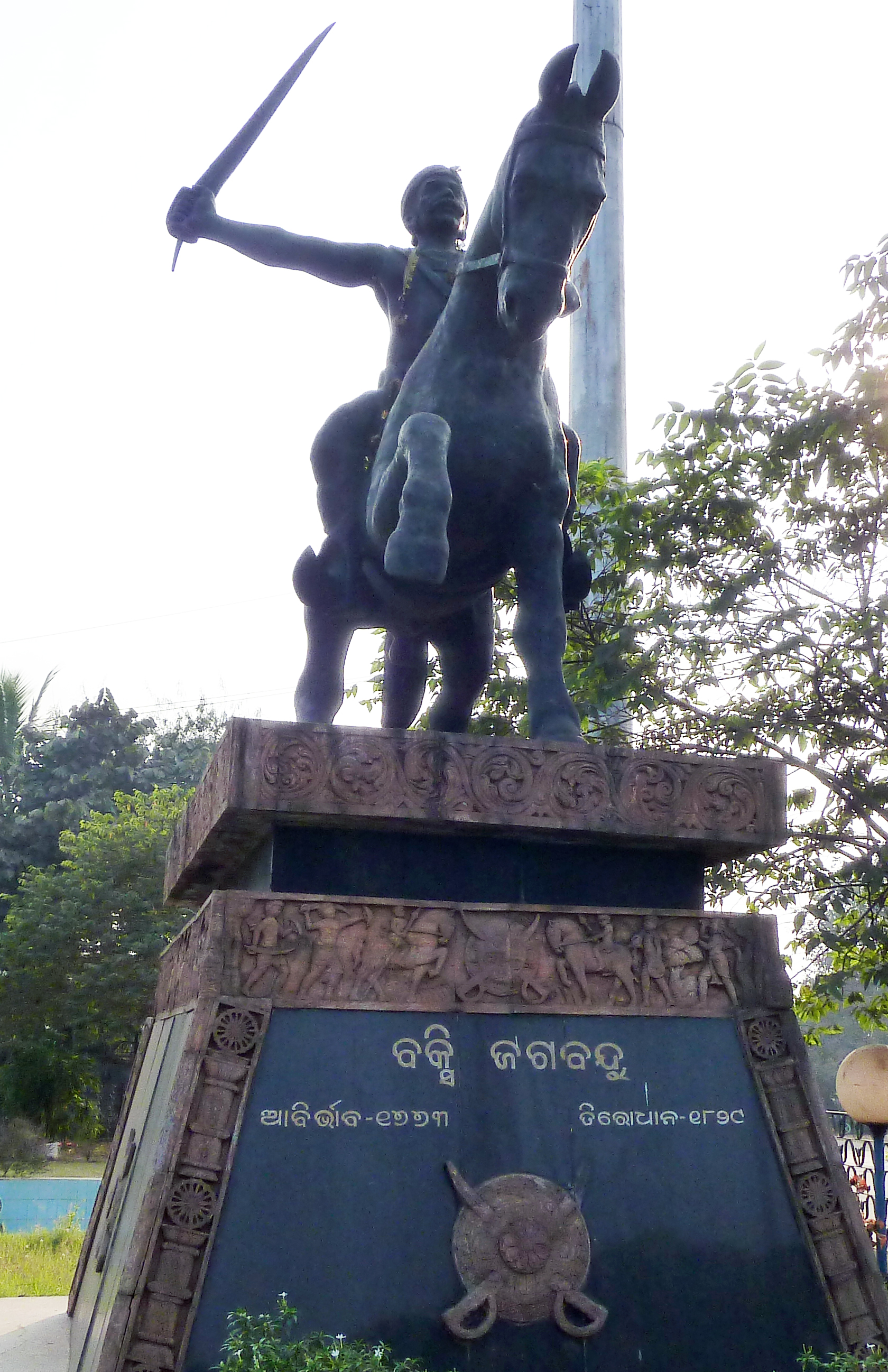
Statue of Buxi Jagabandhu, the leader of Paika Rebellion, in Bhubaneswar.

Jagabandhu Bidyadhara Mohapatra Bhramarbara Raya popularly known as Buxi Jagabandhu (Odia: ବକ୍ସି ଜଗବନ୍ଧୁ) was the commander (Buxi) of the forces of the king of Khurda. He is one of the earliest freedom fighters of India. The Paika rebellion in 1817 was under his leadership. The BJB College in Bhubaneswar has been named after this great personality.

== Life ==
Jagabandhu Bidyadhara had got the title of Buxi in inheritance from his ancestors which represents the rank of the commander of the forces of the King of Khurda, a rank second only to the king. He was born in an aristocratic family. family was provided with Jagirs (vast landed properties and other requisites) and the estate of ‘Killa Roranga’ for generations by the King of Khurda.

== The Paika Rebellion ==
It was the first rebellion of the Paika (soldiers of Odisha) with the support of common people against the British Rule. The land revenue policy of the British was the primary cause of the rebellion in 1817. The rent-free land tenures provided to the soldiers for their military service on a hereditary basis were taken away in the settlement by Major Fletcher as their service were not required anymore. This policy resulted in the deprivation of Buxi Jagabandhu from his estates and forced him to depend on the voluntary contributions from the people of Khurda. This policy also affected the zamindars as well as ryots. Another important cause for that great event was the raise in salt price. As a result, Buxi Jagabandhu led the tribals of Banapur and Ghumusar and bravely marched towards Khurda to fight against colonial power. He had an army of 400 Kandhas who fought bravely. The rebellion received extensive support from the common people. Even the Kandhas of Banapur became successful in their revolutionary activities. The rebellion was expanded throughout the state and continued for a quite long time. Government buildings were burnt, policemen were killed and government treasury looted. However, the fewer in number paika were unable to defeat their well-equipped British counterpart and receded back to the jungles, where they continued to resist the British. A number of them were captured, tried and executed in the last stages of the rebellion. Bidyadhar was imprisoned in 1825 and died in jail four years later in 1829.
