= Pankapal =

Coordinates: 20.300010°N 86.440032°E

Pankapal is a moderate size village in the district of Jagatsinghpur of Odisha State, India. The history of the village can be traced back to the 18th century when two brothers from the Puri region migrated and settled down in the present-day Pankapal. The village falls by the side of the Cuttack-Paradeep state highway 12 that branches out from OMP square at Cuttack to Pradeep and the near Mahanadi river. The village is about 60 km from Cuttack and 30 km from Paradeep. It is situated at 20.30N, 86.44E. The pincode of Pankapal is 754140.

== Economy ==
The village has a large community of farmers who grow different crops, such as rice and black grams. A village market consisting of about 100 permanent shops and a weekly vegetable market on Sunday and Wednesday is running smoothly.

== Government ==
Pankapal gram panchayat (the third level of Indian democracy) office is situated in Pankapal village. Presently this panchayat includes 5 villages i.e. Pankapal, Jahnapal, Chandapur, Banikunda & Pahana. Earlier there were many villages under this Panchayat, but due to the increase of population today only 5 villages are notified under this panchayat. As usual, the people of the gram panchayat elect a sarpanch and 19 ward members to represent them. Pankapal village comes under the Paradeep assembly constituency and Jagatsinghpur parliamentary constituency. The first Sarpanch of Pankapal Gram Panchayat was Late Sri Choudhury Banshidhar Mishra, a visionary leader of that locality, who took many initiatives to bring many changes in people's lives and the village itself got prominence due to various welfare activities.

== Health care ==
Pankapal has a primary health centre which employs an MBBS doctor and several supporting staff. The hospital treats minor ailments and performs minor surgeries.

== Culture ==
The culture and tradition of Pankapal village are primarily centred around the Gopinath Jew temple, where the deities of Gopinath Jew, Radha, Jagannath, Balabhadra and Subhadra are worshipped. The temple celebrates Dola Purnima, Jhulan Jatra, Sri Rama Charita Manas, Rahash Yatra, Chandan Yatra, Snana Purnima Utsab, Jananmastami Utsab, Arnakuta and Nanda Utsab every year. The villagers offer arati (ghee lamps) to the deities every evening. There is a Shiva temple also in the same compound, making this temple a unique, Baishnava-Shaiva conjugation. The worshipers believe that these two lords are essential for their well-being. Besides Gopinath Jew temple, the other temples in the village include Sri Chandrasekhar Temple and Neelakantheswar temple where Shiva is being worshipped. Shivratri is the most awaited festival of these temples. Sri Chandrasekhar Temple is the oldest temple in the village.

== Education ==
In Pankapal panchayat, the education facility has increased rapidly the since the 1990s. Nowadays this panchayat includes many schools (both private and government). In pankapal village, there are six schools. There is a lower primary school, an upper primary school and a Pankapal High School (established in 1958). Besides these government-run schools, there are several private schools such as Gyana Vikash, Vidya Bharati (since 2002), Sri Aurobinda Purnanga Sikhya Kendra (established in 1990) and Saraswati Shishu Vidya Mandir (SSVM). The village also houses a women's college for Intermediate education in Arts subjects. Besides that, a post office, a block education office and a junior engineer RD office are also running.
