= Chasa (caste) =

Agrian community of Odisha, India

- Religions: Hinduism
- Languages: Odia
- Populated states: Odisha
- Subdivisions: Odachasa, Odapadhan
- Related groups: Gopal

Chasa is a caste in India natively residing in the Indian state of Odisha. The Chasas were traditionally cultivators but are now engaged in several professions. The Odia word chasa means farmer. They are the third-largest caste by population in Odisha.

== History ==
The Orh/Oda Chasas claim that they were the first tribe to settle in Odisha, and that they began to cultivate the land. They claim that Odisha is named after them.

They are classified as Shudra in the Hindu caste system. The association between Chasas and their occupation of manual labour (ploughing) was used to stigmatize the Chasas and distinguish them from the upper castes as late as the early 19th century. "Chasa" was considered to be a "generic derogatory term for cultivators", in contrast to the sabhya bhabya Gan "sophisticated people".

Around the turn of the 20th century, Chasas were small farmers and marginal raiyats.

In modern-day Odisha, the Chasas are among the dominant castes in most villages, and are landowners and economically powerful.

== Classification ==
Chasas are classified under the Other Backward Class (OBC) category in Odisha, where 'Odapadhan', a subdivision of the Chasa caste, belong to the Socially and Educationally Backward Classes (SEBC) category. Colonial administrator and ethnographer Sir Herbert Hope Risley notes that, since the caste system is not practiced as per the Varna model he was idolizing, it was possible for outsiders to become Chasas, and wealthy Chasas who took up the title Mohanty could marry into Karana families. Some wealthy Chasas began identifying as Khandayats. The Chasas are ranked into four subcastes: Benatya, Oda/Odra, Chukuliya, and Sukuliya. The Benatyas are the highest in rank, and the Chukuliyas are the lowest.

== People ==
- Sarala Dasa, 15th century Odia poet
