= Paika (community) =

Social group of Odisha, India

- Religions: Hinduism
- Languages: Odia
- Populated states: Odisha

The Paik or Paika (Odia:ପାଇକ) is a Militia community, found in Odisha state of India.

== Origin ==
The Odia word Paika is derived from Padatika or foot soldier. They were a class of military retainers recruited from a variety of social groups to render martial services in return for hereditary rent-free lands and titles. Most Paiks were recruited from Khandayat, Gopal (cowherd) and Chasa (peasant) communities.

Separate Caste

The Caste-based consensus introduced by the Britishers led to the formation of a separate Paika caste.

== History ==
The Paikas (Paikos) started an armed rebellion ( Paika Rebellion or Paika Bidroha ) against the British East India Companys rule in Odisha in 1817.

== Classification ==
The Paikos are included under Other Backward Class list in the state of Odisha.
