= Khandayat (caste) =

Cultivating caste of Odisha, India

- Religions: Hinduism
- Languages: Odia
- Populated states: Odisha
- Population: 1,010,146 (1931 census)

Khandayat, also spelled Khandait, is a cultivating caste, as well as a peasant militia or landed militia caste from Odisha, East India. Some of them had earlier served as feudal chiefs as well as zamindars apart from being land holders and agriculturalists. Numerically they are the largest caste of the state. During British raj, they ruled many tributary states in Odisha, including Khordha. Khandayat is recognized as a Socially and Economically Backward Class (SEBC or state OBC, not in central list) in Orissa.

== Etymology ==
The term Khandayat is believed to have originated from the word "Khanda" meaning sword. Khandayat means swordsman or headman of a Khand.

== History ==
Early mention of Khandayats as feudal chief and military personnel is found during the rule of eastern ganga dynasty in 11th century. Historian Ratnalekha Ray noted that aboriginal Bhuiya and Bhumij chiefs assumed the title of Khandayat as a sign of status.

During this time, Khandayat military settlements were established in Bhubaneswar and nearby areas to protect the Great Lingaraj Temple.

During the medieval period, this class of peasant warriors or landed militia acquired good amounts of agricultural land and some of them became local zamindars.

Mughal chronicler Ain-i-Akbari gave a clear picture of Odisha after the breakdown of the Gajapati Empire. It mentioned different forts ruled by Khandayat Zamindars along with their King Mukund Dev.

The British conquered Odisha in 1803 and implemented land reforms to increase tax revenue. Khandayats enjoyed tax-free lands in Khurda Kingdom in strictly military tenure. But after their Paika Rebellion, they lost most of the free-hold lands.

During British rule, some wealthy people from communities such as Adivasis, Bhuyans, Chasas, and Agharias started identifying as Khandayats in order to gain status, distance themselves from their original castes/communities, and exploit Zamindar land rights.

Currently, the Odia Khandayat caste is recognised by the Government of Odisha among the socially and educationally backward classes (SEBC), though they are not entitled to any reservation benefit provided by the central Government of India.

== Varna status ==
Traditionally, they are a peasant militia caste who claim themselves to be of Kshatriya status considering their quasi-martial background, but they were considered by the Brahmins and others to be in the Shudra varna category due to the majority of Khandayats being peasants. Pradhan also attributes this to Brahmin patronage of Rajputs, who also claimed to be of Kshatriya status.
