= Kripa (philosophy) =

Kripa (Sanskrit: कृपा, IAST: kṛpā) is the concept of divine grace in Hinduism. It is the central tenet of Bhakti Yoga and Bhakti movements, which are seen as reform movements in Hinduism as compared to the Hinduism which finds its origins in the Vedas; though variously it can mean "grace", "mercy", or "blessing", depending upon the context. The Hindi word Kirpala from Sanskrit Kripala means "kind" and is used as a given name for males, while "Kripa" (Kṛpā), is used as a female given name.

== Significance of Kripa ==
Kripa is akin to similar beliefs prevalent in mysticism of all traditions. In Hinduism as well, the bestowal of divine grace or Kripa is considered an event which catapults a devotee or bhakta into a period of intense personal transformation leading to his Moksha.

Devotional or Bhakti literature available throughout India is replete with references to Kripa as the ultimate key towards realizing the spiritual path of self-realization In fact, some like the ancient sage Vasistha, in his classical work Yoga Vasistha, considered it to be the only way to transcend the bondage of lifetimes of Karma. He states to Rama that divine grace or Kripa is the only way to help us go beyond the effects of Prarabdha karma, or collection of all the past Karmas, Sanchita karma chosen to experience during a lifetime.

The Hindu philosopher Madhvacharya held that grace was not a gift from God, but rather must be earned.

As Krishna says to Arjuna in the final chapter of the Bhagavad Gita, Verse 18.66, "Setting aside all meritorious deeds (Dharma), just surrender completely to My will (with firm faith and loving contemplation). I shall liberate you from all sins. Do not fear."

Similarly, verse 1 of Bhaja Govindam, traditionally attributed to Adi Shankaracharya, states:

Bhaja Govindam Bhaja Govindam
Govindam Bhaja Moodhamate
Sampraapte Sannihite Kaale
Na Hi Na Hi Rakshati Dukrinyakarane

Translation:

Seek Govinda, Seek Govinda, Seek Govinda, O Fool!
When the appointed time comes (death). grammar-rules surely will not save you.

The Skanda Purana mentions the grace of a Guru in various places, especially in the Uttarakhand, section Guru Strotram, known as Guru Gita, in the form of a dialogue between Shiva and Uma (Shakti):

"Guru Brahma Guru Vishnu
Guru Devo Maheshwara
Guru Sakshat Param Brahma
Tasmai Shri Gurave Namah"

"Dhyana Moolam Guru Murti.
Puja Moolam Gurur Padam,
Mantra Moolam Gurur Vakyam,
Moksha Moolam Guru Kripa".

== Bhakti movement ==
Bhakti or devotion is mentioned in Upanishads, Bhagavad Gita, and Puranas and is the basis of many Hindu sects.

== Kinds of Kripa ==
Kripa has been categorized in various ways as Ishvara kripa (grace of God), variously Hari Kripa, Shastra kripa (grace of the Scriptures), Guru kripa (grace of the Guru) and lastly Atma kripa (grace of the Self).

== See also ==
- Prasāda
