= Mokshopaya =

Sanskrit text on salvation for non-ascetics, later vedanticized into the Yoga Vasistha

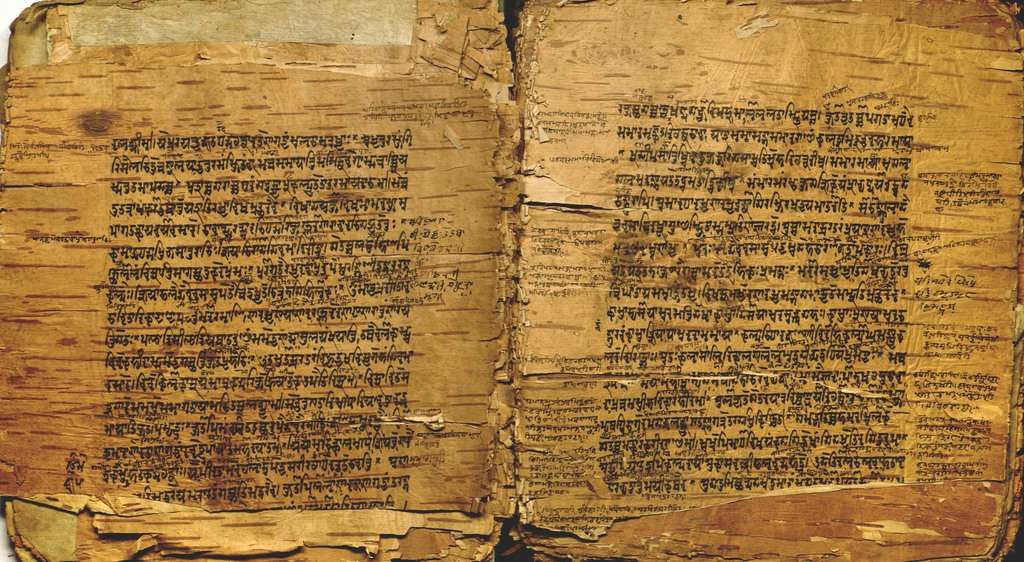
Birch bark manuscript S14 of the Utpattiprakaraṇa Mokṣopāya (circa 16th-17th century)

The Mokṣopāya or Mokṣopāyaśāstra, also known as the Yogavāsiṣṭha, is a Sanskrit philosophical text on salvation for non-ascetics (lit. 'means to liberation'), written in Kashmir in the 10th century. The main part of the text forms a dialogue between Vasiṣṭha and Rāma, interchanged with numerous short stories and anecdotes to illustrate the content. This text was later (11th to the 14th century) expanded, showing influences from the Saivite Trika school, resulting in the Yogavāsiṣṭha, which became an orthodox text in Advaita Vedanta.

== Text ==
=== Dating and development ===
According to Slaje, the Mokṣopāya was written on the Pradyumna hill in Śrīnagar, Kashmir, in the 10th century. The Mokṣopāya was later (11th to the 14th century) modified, showing influences from the Saivite Trika school, resulting in the Yogavāsiṣṭha, which became an orthodox text in Advaita Vedanta.

=== Composition ===
It has the form of a public sermon and claims human authorship and contains about 30,000 śloka's (making it longer than the Rāmāyaṇa). The main part of the text forms a dialogue between Vasiṣṭha and Rāma, interchanged with numerous short stories and anecdotes to illustrate the content.

== Contents ==
The Mokṣopāya expounds a monism ('advaita') that is different from Advaita Vedanta. It makes use of other Darśanas in an inclusive way. The text teaches that the recognition that cognitive objects are non-existent, leads to ultimate detachment, which causes an attitude of "dispassion and non-involvement with worldly things and matters", though still fulfilling one's daily duties and activities. It is only by one's own effort (pauruṣa) that one can be liberated from the bonds of existence. For one who knows the reality, "fate" (daiva) does not mean anything, something like "fate" does not exist and has, accordingly, no consequences at all.

Liberation is available for everyone, no matter their sex, caste or education, as long as one uses reason and maintains an active life in this world. To reach this liberation, one has to go through three stages: rational thinking and discernment (vicāra), true understanding (jñāna) and detachment (vairāgya). Vicāra specifically involves knowledge that the world is non-existent. Jñāna is the true understanding of the atman as the ultimate reality, due to which one loses ahamkara. The last stage of vairagya is dispassionate and without a cause.

== Mokṣopāya Project ==
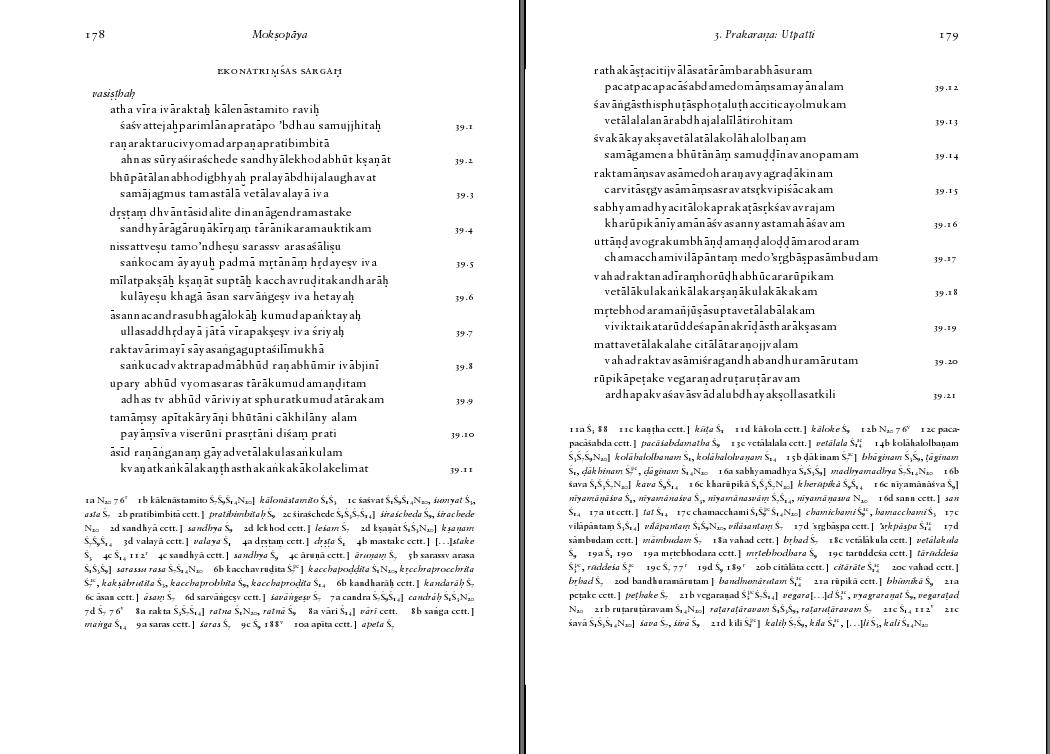
Sample of the critical edition of the Utpattiprakaraṇa Moksopaya

The Mokṣopāya Project supervised by professor Walter Slaje at the Martin Luther University of Halle-Wittenberg in Germany is currently working on a critical edition of the Mokṣopāya. The project is embedded in the Centre for Research in the Historiography and Intellectual Culture of Kashmir (under the Patronage of the Academy of Sciences and Literature, Mainz). A commentary by Bhāskarakaṇṭha ("Mokṣopāya-ṭīkā"; late 17th century) and more than thirty manuscripts in Nāgarī, Śāradā, Grantha, and Telugu scripts are being used.

The goal of the project is a critical edition of the complete Sanskrit text, accompanied by a German translation, a philological commentary and a dictionary of its Sanskrit vocabulary.

== Translations ==
- Swami Venkatesananda (1984). The Concise Yoga Vasistha. State University of New York Press.

== See also ==
- Buddhism and Hinduism in Kashmir
- Yogavāsiṣṭha

== Sources ==
- Chapple, Christopher (1984). "Introduction". The Concise Yoga Vāsiṣṭha. Translated by Venkatesananda, Swami. Albany: State University of New York Press. ISBN 0-87395-955-8. OCLC 11044869.
- Hanneder, Jürgen (2000). "Notes on the Quality of the Text". Wiener Zeitschrift für die Kunde Südasiens. 44: 183–210. doi:10.11588/xarep.00004394.
- Hanneder, Jürgen; Slaje, Walter (2005). "Mokṣopāya Project: Introduction". Archived from the original on 28 December 2005.
- Hanneder, Jürgen (2006). Studies on the Mokṣopāya. Otto Harrassowitz Verlag. ISBN 3-447-05422-0.
- Leslie, Julia (2003). Authority and meaning in Indian religions: Hinduism and the case of Vālmīki. Ashgate Publishing, Ltd. ISBN 0-7546-3431-0.
- Manjdadria, Lekh Raj (2002). "The State of Research to date on the Yogavasistha (Moksopaya)]" (PDF). Archived from the original (PDF) on 15 September 2013.
- Moise, Ionut (2019-11-21). Salvation in Indian Philosophy: Perfection and Simplicity for Vaiśeṣika. Routledge. p. 38. ISBN 978-1-000-76499-4.
- Olivelle, Patrick (January–March 1997). "Bhaskarakanthas Moksopaya-Tika: Die Fragmente des 3. Prakarana". Journal of the American Oriental Society.
- Sanderson, Alexis (2007). "The Śaiva Exegesis of Kashmir". In Goodall, Dominic; Padoux, André (eds.). Mélanges tantriques à la mémoire d'Hélène Brunner: Tantric studies in memory of Hélène Brunner. Collection Indologie. Vol. 106. Pondicherry: Inst. Français de Pondichéry.
- Slaje, Walter (2000). "Wie man sein Schicksal (daiva) meistert. Der Mokṣopāya über Wesen und Wirksamkeit menschlicher Aktivität (pauruṣa)". Asiatische Studien. 54.
- Slaje, Walter (2005). "Locating the Mokṣopāya". In Hanneder, Jürgen (ed.). The Mokṣopāya, Yogavāsiṣṭha and Related Texts. Indologica Halensis. Geisteskultur Indiens. 7. Aachen: Shaker Verlag. ISBN 978-3-8322-4265-7.
- Slaje, Walter (2005b). "Locating the Mokṣopāya".
