= Divine grace =

Theological term

Divine grace is a theological term present in many religions. It has been defined as the divine influence which operates in humans—to regenerate and sanctify, to inspire virtuous impulses, and to impart strength to endure trial and resist temptation—and as an individual virtue or excellence of divine origin.

== Eastern religions ==
=== Hinduism ===
Hindu devotional literature, also known as bhakti literature, across India and Nepal is replete with references to divine grace (kripa, Sanskrit: कृपा, IAST: kŗpā) as the ultimate requirement for spiritual self-realization or liberation.

For example, the ancient sage Vasistha, in his classical work Yoga Vasistha, considered it to be the only way to transcend the bondage of lifetimes of karma. The Hindu philosopher Madhvacharya held that grace was not a gift from God, but rather must be earned. The Alvars, South Indian poet saints, held kripa as the only means to liberation.

=== Buddhism ===
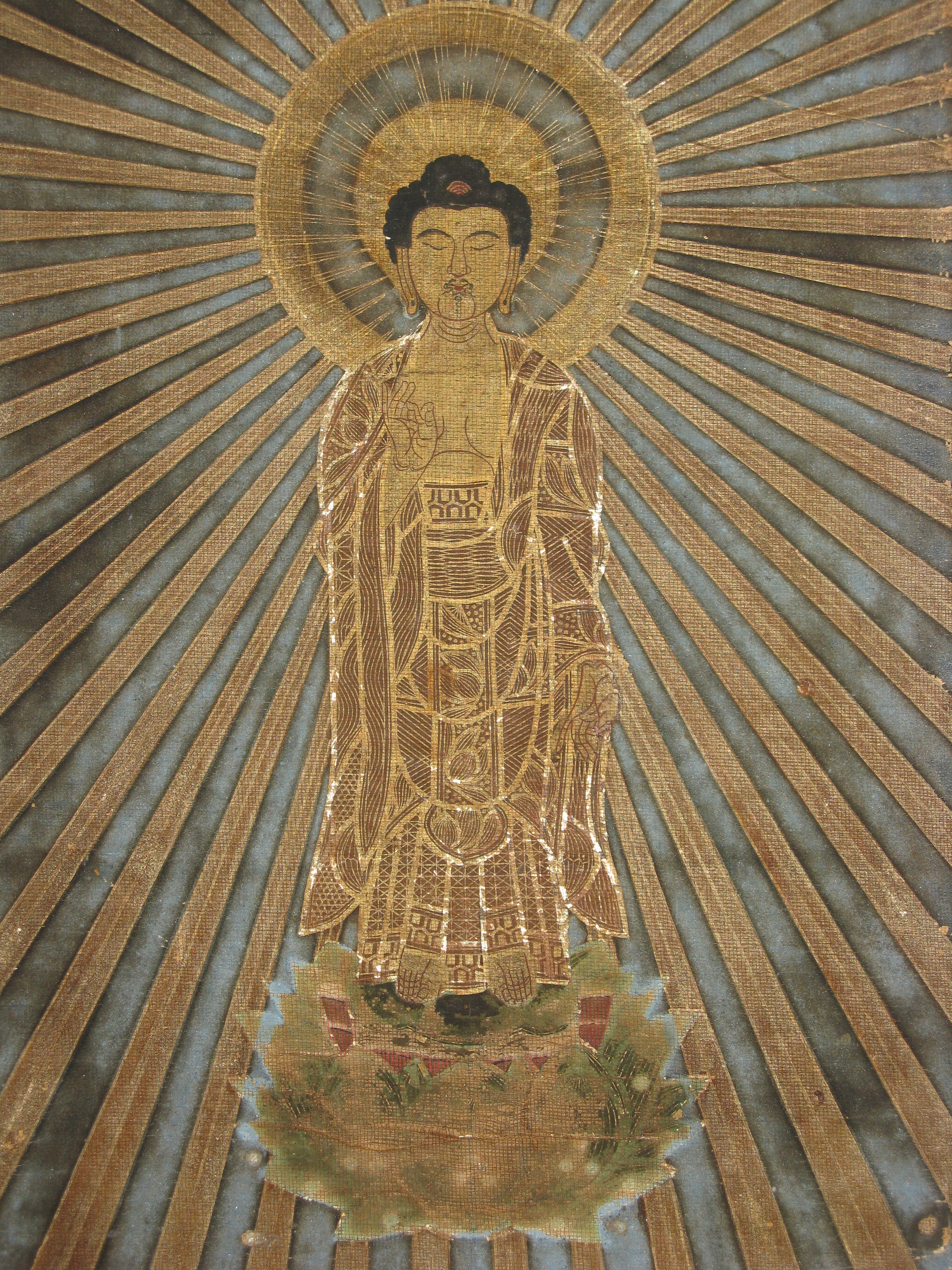
"Amida Manifesting in the Dharma-body of Expedient Means", Japanese painting, at the Met.

While many schools of Buddhism emphasize self-discipline and the accumulation of merit and wisdom on the path to enlightenment, something akin to the concept of divine grace is present as well. This idea is found in the Mahāyāna Buddhist concepts of "blessings", transference of merit and "other-power". Other power is a concept in East Asian Buddhism that designates the active influence exerted by a Buddha upon sentient beings. In its most characteristic formulation, found in Pure Land Buddhism, it refers specifically to the salvific efficacy of a Buddha’s vow-generated power, enabling beings to attain rebirth in a Pure Land and thereby advance toward Buddhahood. This idea is commonly contrasted with “self-power,” the reliance on one’s own meditative, ascetic, or moral efforts to achieve liberation. Furthermore, the concept of "merit" refers to the power of good karma built up over time through extensive spiritual practice. This merit can be transferred to other sentient beings by a Buddha or an adept bodhisattva.

Although the term “other power” emerged in Chinese Buddhist discourse, it corresponds to a wide range of Indian Mahāyāna concepts such as adhiṣṭhāna, and anubhāva, that describe divine assistance, Buddha-inspired transformation, and the causal force of the Buddha’s past vows. In this way, the doctrine situates liberation not solely in the practitioner’s agency but also in the Buddha’s ongoing, responsive activity. Indian precedents for other power are pervasive in early and classical Mahāyāna literature. The Mahāsāṃghika tradition already advanced an exalted conception of the Buddha whose supernatural capacities were unlimited and universally operative, establishing an early framework for understanding the Buddha’s power as transcendent and omnipresent. Mahāyāna sūtras further elaborate this theme by depicting the Buddha’s majesty, radiance, sustaining power, and vow-force as capable of inspiring disciples, shaping their speech, protecting them, and generating the conditions for their progress on the bodhisattva path. Texts such as the Aṣṭasāhasrikā Prajñāpāramitā, the Avataṃsaka, the Gaṇḍavyūha, and the Laṅkāvatāra portray the Buddha’s intervention as indispensable for the maturation of bodhisattvas, the arising of visions, the stabilization of samādhi, and even the attainment of liberation. These sources present other power not as a peripheral notion but as a structural feature of Mahāyāna soteriology.

The developed Pure Land traditions of China and Japan are particularly focused on the doctrine of other power. In this tradition, other power refers to the power of Amida Buddha, who countless millennia ago made a primal vow to save all sentient beings by building up enough merit to establish a pure land, into which beings could be reborn simply by invoking his name, and in which they could easily attain full enlightenment. In Pure Land schools, the distinction between “self-power” and “other-power” becomes a primary doctrinal axis used to classify Buddhist paths. The “path of sages” is associated with difficult practices grounded in one’s own capacities, whereas the “easy path” relies principally on a Buddha’s vow-power, in particular the vows of Amitābha as set forth in the Larger Sukhāvatīvyūha. Within this framework, rebirth in the Pure Land is understood as the result of Amitābha’s power responding to the practitioner’s aspiration. Interpretations vary, however: some thinkers advocate the complete abandonment of self-power practices, while others endorse a model of sympathetic resonance in which one’s efforts harmonize with, and are augmented by, the Buddha’s influence. Chinese Pure Land exegesis frequently emphasizes this cooperative dynamic, whereas certain Japanese traditions foreground the absolute primacy of other power.

In the Japanese school called Jōdo Shinshū, founded by the 12th-century Japanese monk, Shinran, reliance on other power becomes absolute. For Shinran, the only hope for spiritual advancement is giving up on all self-power (Jp: jiriki) and, through faith, or "shinjin," embracing the "other-power" (tariki) of the infinitely-compassionate. The key difference between Shinran's school and other schools of Pure Land Buddhism is the idea that even this faith and the resulting small effort of reciting Amida's name is impossible without the intervening grace of Amida Buddha working in the deluded human being through the power of Amida's primal vow. Therefore, the recitation of Amida's name is seen more as an expression of gratitude for already-existing grace rather than the self-induced catalyst for a grace not yet present.

Vajrayana Buddhism also incorporates the idea that the blessings of a Buddha or a guru and the practitioner’s karmic conditions jointly determine rebirth in Pure Lands and one's enlightenment. More broadly, later developments such as Mantrayāna apply the logic of other power to tantric ritual technologies, holding that mantras, mudrās, mandalas, and initiations work insofar as they reproduce and embody the Buddha’s own power. Across these diverse Buddhist traditions, these doctrines express a consistent Mahāyāna intuition: the Buddha’s salvific activity is not confined to the historical lifetime of Śākyamuni but continues as a dynamic, pervasive force that enables, sustains, and in certain contexts decisively accomplishes the liberation of sentient beings.

=== Sikhism ===
In Sikhism, divine grace is characterized as divine blessing that transcends human effort, allowing the seeker to progress beyond individual limits. In Guru Nanak's thought in the Sikh tradition, divine grace of the Akal Purakh (the Ultimate Reality) is the means by which that Akal Purakh, who otherwise transcends human comprehension, can be "known in personal experience." The Akal Purakh, though comprehended as nirankar and without gender, is seen as both a father and mother figure; as a mother figure, this Supreme Being is the source of grace.

The grace of the gurus is also emphasised in Sikh thought. For example, it is said in Adi Granth 352 that one is completely absorbed in remembering the divine Name through the guru's grace.

Moreover, the importance of divine grace is not only emphasised over the concept of karma, but is understood to even break "the chain of adverse karma." In Sikh doctrine, in the teachings of the Gurus, karma is replaced by the omnipotent Akal Purakh's divine command (hukam). In the teachings of Guru Arjan, divine grace is said to be able to change things such as physical deformity, which is often explained through the framework of karma. For example, in Adi Granth 809–810, it is said that "The cripple can cross a mountain and the blockhead can become an accomplished preacher. The blind can see the three worlds through the grace of the Guru".

== Abrahamic religions ==
=== Judaism ===
In Judaism, divine grace is an attribute of the God of Israel that signifies his chesed (loving-kindness and mercy) for his chosen people and his compassion for sinners, the weak, and the less fortunate. Divine grace is granted even to those unworthy of it. In the Old Testament, the prophets promise divine grace for penitent Jews.

In the Talmud, divine grace is designated by the term "mercy," which is in contrast to divine justice. The divine name Elohim implies mercy, while the Tetragrammaton implies justice. Grace, according to the Jewish sages, is given to merciful people, students of the Torah, and people whose ancestors or descendants merited grace for them. Righteous people can change divine justice to divine mercy.

While medieval Jewish philosophers did not mention divine grace, the Jewish liturgy includes many references to it, especially on Rosh Hashanah and Yom Kippur. The God of Israel is called merciful in many prayers, including the Wehu Raḥum, Ahabah Rabbah, and Shemoneh 'Esrch.

=== Christianity ===
Grace in Christianity is the free and unmerited favour of God as manifested in the salvation of sinners and the bestowing of blessings. Common Christian teaching is that grace is unmerited mercy (favor) that God gave to humanity by sending his Son, Jesus Christ, to die on a cross, thus securing man's eternal salvation from sin.

Within Christianity, there are differing concepts of how grace is attained. In particular, Catholics and Reformed Protestants understand the attainment of grace in substantially different ways. It has been described as "the watershed that divides Catholicism from Protestantism, Calvinism from Arminianism, modern liberalism from conservatism". Catholic doctrine teaches that God has imparted Divine Grace upon humanity and uses the vehicle of sacraments, which are carried out in faith, as a primary and effective means to facilitate the reception of his grace. For Catholics and Liturgical Protestants, sacraments (carried out in faith) are the incarnational or tangible vehicle through which God's grace becomes personally and existentially received. Evangelical Protestants, generally, do not share this sacramental view on the transmittal of grace, but instead favor a less institutionalized mechanism. For example, in the Catholic Church and the earlier Protestant churches (Lutheran, Reformed, Presbyterian, Anglican, etc.), the primary initiation into a state of grace is granted by God through infant baptism (in faith) instead of by a simple prayer of faith (sinner's prayer); although, Catholics would not deny the possible efficacy of even a simple prayer for God's grace to flow (Baptism by desire).

In another example, for Catholics, the sacrament of reconciliation (in faith) is the primary means of transmitting grace after a mortal sin has been committed.

In the New Testament, the word translated as grace is the Greek word charis (/ˈkeɪrɪs/; Ancient Greek: χάρις), for which Strong's Concordance gives this definition: "Graciousness (as gratifying), of manner or act (abstract or concrete; literal, figurative or spiritual; especially the divine influence upon the heart, and its reflection in the life; including gratitude)". Spiritual gifts or charismata, which comes from the word family charis, are defined in the New Bible Dictionary as "grace coming to visible effect in word or deed." A Greek word that is related to charis is charisma (gracious gift). Both of these words originated from another Greek word chairo (to rejoice, be glad, or be delighted).

In the Old Testament, the Hebrew term used is chen (חֵן), which is defined in Strong's as "favor, grace or charm; grace is the moral quality of kindness, displaying a favorable disposition". In the King James translation, chen is translated as "grace" 38 times, "favour" 26 times, twice as "gracious", once as "pleasant", and once as "precious".

=== Islam ===
Salafi scholar Umar Sulayman al-Ashqar, dean of the Faculty of Islamic Law at Zarqa Private University in Zarqa, Jordan, wrote that "Paradise is something of immense value; a person cannot earn it by virtue of his deeds alone, but by the Grace and Mercy of Allah." This stance is supported by hadith: according to Abu Huraira, Muhammad once said that "None amongst you can get into Paradise by virtue of his deeds alone ... not even I, but that Allah should wrap me in his grace and mercy."

The Quran says "God is the Possessor of Infinite Grace" and "He bestows this grace upon whomsoever He wills (or desires)." Grace is something attainable by those here on earth from God who meet certain Quranic criteria. For example, they "believe in God and His messengers", and they "race toward forgiveness from their Lord and a Paradise whose width encompasses the heavens and the earth."

== See also ==
- Barakah
- Divine Principle
- Hana
- Amazing Grace (Hymn)

== Sources ==
- Strong, James (2001), The Strongest Strong's Exhaustive Concordance of the Bible, Zondervan, ISBN 978-0-310-23343-5
- Stongnumbers.com, Online Parallel Bible Project (Biblos.com)
- Biblestudytools.com, Salem Web Network
