= Jivanmukta =

In Jainism and Advaita Vedanta, someone who has attained moksha while being alive

A jivan mukta is someone who has attained moksha while living (or being embodied), rather than after death. Jivanmukti contrasts with the concept of videhamukti, "liberation or emancipation after death, in afterlife". Advaita Vedanta and the Yoga-tradition deem moksha attainable during life.

== Etymology ==
Jīvanmukta (Sanskrit: जीवन्मुक्त) is an adjective derived from the Sanskrit noun जीव jīva, "life", and the past participle of the verb मुच् much, or IAST muc, "to liberate".

Jīvanmukti (Sanskrit: जीवन्मुक्ति:) means, "liberation during life, liberation before death", "emancipation while still alive", "emancipated while still alive". Other translations include "self realization", "living liberation", "enlightenment", "liberated soul", or "self liberation".

In the śramaṇic traditions, the jīvanmukta is called an arhat in Buddhism and arihant in Jainism.

== Characteristics ==
A jivanmukta is a person who has attained moksha while being embodied. According to the Nāradaparivrājaka Upanishad, the jivanmukta shows attributes such as:

- He is not bothered by disrespect and endures cruel words, treats others with respect regardless of how others treat him;
- He when confronted by an angry person he does not return anger, instead replies with soft and kind words;
- Even if tortured, he speaks and trusts the truth;
- He does not crave for blessings or expect praise from others;
- He never injures or harms any life or being (ahimsā), he is intent in the welfare of all beings;
- He is as comfortable being alone as in the presence of others;
- He is as comfortable with a bowl, at the foot of a tree in tattered robe without help, as when he is in a mithuna (union of mendicants), grama (village) and nagara (city);
- He does not care about or wear śikhā (tuft of hair on the back of head for religious reasons), nor the holy thread across his body. To him, knowledge is śikhā, knowledge is the holy thread, knowledge alone is supreme. Outer appearances and rituals do not matter to him, only knowledge matters;
- For him there is no invocation nor dismissal of deities, no mantra nor non-mantra, no prostrations nor worship of gods, goddess or ancestors, nothing other than knowledge;
- He is humble, high-spirited, of clear and steady mind, straightforward, compassionate, patient, indifferent, courageous, speaks firmly and with sweet words.

The Vivekacudamani (11th-1th c. CE) states that a jivanmukta does not act on selfish desires. Skilled in Vairāgya ("non-attachment"), there is no inclination (vāsanā) toward enjoyable objects; bodhā ('awake', 'discerning'), there is no sense of "I" (ahamkara, 'I-making') in regard to things which are an-atman, not-essence; and dispassionate (uparati), the modifications won't arise again. The Jīvanmukta, realizing his true identity as the Real (Sat) or Brahman, is freed from the reification of sense-impressions into discrete objects, and makes difference between the inner ātman and Brahman, or between Brahman and the world. He knows that he is Brahman. "Vijnātabrahmatattvasya yathāpūrvam na samsrtih" – "there is no saṃsāra as before for one who has known Brahman".

== Karma and jivanmukti ==
In Vedanta, particularly Advaita philosophy, karma theory, actions are classified as prarabhda (karmas have begun to bear fruit), samcita (accumulated karmas that have not yet borne fruit), and agami (future karmas and their fruit).

According to Vijnanabhikshu and other thinkers in Vedanta, Samkhya, and Yoga, liberating knowledge destroys samcita karma and agami karma, leading to jivanmukti, but not prarabhda karma, which must be experienced once it has begun. While the jivanmukta has attained liberating knowledge, they continue to live in the body until the ripened karmas are exhausted and no new karma is generated.

There are three kinds of Prārabdha Karma: Ichha ("personally desired"), Anichhā ("without desire") and Parechhā ("due to others' desire"). For a self-realized person, a Jīvanmukta, there is no ichhā-prārabdha but the two others, anichhāa and parechhā, remain, which even a jīvanmukta has to undergo. According to the Advaita school, for those of wisdom, prārabdha is liquidated only by experience of its effects; sancita ("accumulated karmas") and āgami ("future karmas") are destroyed in the fire of Dñāna ("knowledge").

== See also ==
- Anavrtti

== Sources ==
- Fort, Andrew O. (1998). Jivanmukti in Transformation: Embodied Liberation in Advaita and Neo-Vedanta. State University of New York Press. ISBN 978-0-7914-3904-3.
