= Prarabdha karma =

Concept in Hinduism

- Samkhya: Kapila
- Yoga: Patanjali
- Vaisheshika: Kaṇāda, Prashastapada
- Secular: Valluvar

Prarabdha karma are the part of sanchita karma, a collection of past karmas, which are ready to be experienced through the present body (incarnation).

According to Swami Sivananda: "Prarabdha is that portion of the past karma which is responsible for the present body. That portion of the sanchita karma which influences human life in the present incarnation is called prarabdha. It is ripe for reaping. It can be avoided or changed by performing the right Karma to nullify the effects of Prarabdh Karmas. In normal way it is only exhausted by being experienced. You pay your past debts. Prarabdha karma is that which has begun and is actually bearing fruit. It is selected out of the mass of the sanchita karma."

Each lifetime, a certain portion of the sanchita karma, most suited for spiritual evolution at the time, is chosen to be worked out during the course of the lifetime. Subsequently, this Prarabdha Karma creates circumstances that we are destined to experience in our present lifetime. They also place certain limitations via our physical family, body, or life circumstances into which we are born, as charted in our birth chart or horoscope, collectively known as fate or destiny (determinism).

== Kinds of Prarabdha Karma ==
There are three kinds of Prarabdha karma: Ichha (personally desired), Anichha (without desire) and Parechha (due to others' desire). For a self realized person, a Jivan mukta, there is no Ichha-Prarabdha, but the other two, Anichha and Parechha, remain, which even a jivan mukta has to undergo.

== Primary literature ==
'Prarabdha' (Devanagari: प्रारब्ध) is employed in the Nada Bindu Upanishad verse 21 as follows in Devanagari for probity and as rendered in English by K. Narayanasvami Aiyar (1914):

आत्मानं सततं ज्ञात्वा कालं नय महामते | प्रारब्धमखिलं भुञ्जन्नोद्वेगं कर्तुमर्हसि || २१||
21. O intelligent man, spend your life always in the knowing of the supreme bliss, enjoying the whole of your Prarabdha (that portion of past Karma now being enjoyed) without making any complaint (of it).

== End of Prarabdha Karma ==
Ramana Maharshi presents another viewpoint when he says, "If the agent, upon whom the Karma depends, namely the ego, which has come into existence between the body and the Self, merges in its source and loses its form, how can the Karma, which depends upon it, survive? When there is no ‘I’ there is no Karma.", a point well reiterated by sage Vasistha in his classical work Yoga Vasistha, wherein, when Lord Rama asks sage Vasistha about the way to transcend the two binding effects of past karmas, namely Vasanas or the effect of impressions left on the mind by past actions and one's fate created by Prarabdha Karma, to which he replies, through with Divine grace (Kripa), one can go beyond the influences of past actions.

The Bhakti Yoga theme within the Chapter seven of the Bhagavad Gita also talks eloquently about the concept of Kripa, but its most important verse comes in the final eighteenth chapter, about Liberation, where Krishna finally makes a sweeping statement to Arjuna in Verse 18.66, "Setting aside all meritorious deeds (Dharma), just surrender completely to My will (with firm faith and loving contemplation). I shall liberate you from all sins. Do not fear."

While Madhvacharya does not explicitly state why Vishnu created the universe, a possible interpretation is that a universe enables jivas to manifest prarabdha karma and create new karma. It also allows for suffering and bondage to either continue or end.

== See also ==
- Kriyamana karma
- Sanchita karma
