= Anavrtti =

Vedic term for emancipation

Anavrtti (Sanskrit: अनावृत्ति) is a Vedic term which means – non-return to a body, final emancipation. This word refers to the Jivanmukta.

== Overview ==
Anavrtti means path of no return. It indicates the non-return of the soul to a new body, and refers to the end of the seemingly endless vicious cycle of birth, death and rebirth, the transmigration of soul from one body to another. Badarayana concludes with the statement: - अनावृत्तिः शब्दादनावृत्तिः शब्दात् || (Brahma sutra IV.iv.22) – "There is no return for the released souls on the strength of the upanishadic declaration". This word, characterized by no return, is very common in Vedanta literature.

== Upanishadic connection ==
Before concluding his deliberation on Brahman, Badarayana explains that the released souls are of two kinds – with or without bodies and senses; that the released soul gets all the divine powers except running the universe, and that Brahman does not abide in the effect as shown by Chandogya Upanishad (III.xii.6) –

तावानस्य महिमा ततो ज्यायाश्च पूरुषः |
पादोऽस्य सर्वा भूतानि त्रिपादस्यामृतं दिवि ||

" His divine majesty spreads that far; the whole universe of all these beings is but a quadrant of His. But Purusa (the infinite Being) is greater than that, His three immortal quadrants being established in His own effulgence."

He states that Brahman is the supreme Light beyond all changing things with which there is equality of experience alone. Having reached that state there is no return for the released soul. In this context Sankara states that Badarayana reiterates - तेषां न पुनरावृत्तिः ("They no more return to this world") (Brihadaranyaka Upanishad VI.ii.15) or न च पुनरावर्तते ("He does not return again") (Chandogya Upanishad VIII.xv.1), and adds that non-return stands as an accomplished fact for those from whom the darkness of ignorance has been completely removed as a result of their full illumination and who therefore cling to that liberation as their highest goal which exists ever as an already established fact; the non-return of those who take refuge in the qualified Brahman becomes a fact only because they too have that unconditioned Brahman as their ultimate resort.

== Rig Vedic connection ==
The concept of Anavrtti has a direct relation with the concept of Transmigration of Souls. Ramachandra Dattatrya Ranade in his book, A Constructive Survey of Upanishadic Philosophy finds the concept of Transmigration of Souls developing in the Rig Veda. He draws our attention to the following mantras of Sukta 164 of Rishi Dirghatamas:-

को ददर्श प्रथमं जायमानमस्थन्वन्तं यदनस्था बिभर्ति |
भूम्या असुरसृगात्मा क्वं स्वित्को विद्वांसमुपगात्प्रष्टमेतत् ||

whereby the Rishi asks, who has ever seen the precise mode in which the boneless soul, the very life-blood and informing spirit of the earth, comes to inhabit a bony tenement? And if a man did not know this himself, who has ever moved out of himself and gone to the wise man to receive illumination on it? (Rig Veda I.164.4), that

अनच्छये तुरगातु जीवमेजद्ध्रुवं मध्य आ पस्त्यानाम् |
जीवो मृतस्य चरति स्वधाभिरमत्र्यो मत्र्येना सयोनिः ||

this breathing, speedful, moving life-principle is firmly established inside these tenements (Rig Veda I.164.30), that

अपाङ् प्राङेति स्वधया गृभीतोऽमत्र्यो मत्रेना सयोनिः |
ता शश्वन्ता विषूचीना वियन्तान्य१न्यं चिक्युर्न नि चिक्युरन्यम् ||

the immortal principle, conjoined with the mortal one, moves backwards and forwards by virtue of its natural power; these two elements keep moving ceaselessly in opposite directions, with the result that people are able to see the one but are unable to see the other (Rig Veda I.164.38); that

अपश्यं गोपामनिपद्यमानमा च परा च पथिभिश्चरन्तम् |
स सध्रीचोः स विषूचीर्वसान आ वरीवर्त्ति भुवनेष्वन्तः ||

the Rishi tells us he himself saw (with his mind’s eye) the guardian of the body, moving unerringly by backward and forward paths, clothed in collected and diffusive splendor, only to keep returning frequently inside the mundane regions (Rig Veda I.164.31);

ये अर्वाञ्च्स्ताँ उ पराच आहुर्ये पराञ्च्स्ताँ उ अर्वाच आहुः |
इन्द्रश्च वा चक्रथुः सोम तानि धुरा न युक्ता रजसो वहन्ति ||

and talks of those who come hither as those who are moving away, and those who are moving back as already returning hither (Rig Veda I.164.19)

== Implication ==
Ramachandra Dattatrya Ranade clarifies that whenever there is recognized the possibility of the soul coming to inhabit a body as a god-like principle from without, wherever it is supposed that the soul could likewise part from the body as it came, wherever it is thought that the soul after parting from the body could lead a life of disembodied existence, and wherever it is supposed to return again to the earth and inhabit any form of existence whatsoever, there is a kind of undying life conceived for the soul. Sankara explains that the competent man, while performing all prescribed things in the householders life itself, living in the way described, to the end of his life, attains after death the world of Brahman and does not return again for becoming embodied. From the negation of return (न च पुनरावर्तते) which must occur as a matter of course, it follows that having reached the world of Hiranyagarbha through the Path of Light etc., he stays there as long as the world of Hiranyagarbha lasts, i.e. before that he does not return. The choice is the psychic death, the death that means the business of realization of our otherness out of love of true liberation, which is achieved by knowledge that even transcends abstract reason.

== Nature of Liberation ==
The Jivanmukta on exhaustion of the Prarabdha karma attains Videha mukti (freedom from the body) at death and becomes one with Brahman. At the time of death the functions of the organs (Speech etc.) are merged in the mind (Brahma Sutras IV.ii.1). Then the mind is merged in Prana, and the Prana (the vital force) gets merged in the Jiva (the individual Soul) (Brahma Sutras IV.ii.3-4). This mode of departure is common for both the knower of the Saguna Brahman and the ignorant up to the beginning of their ways leading to immortality because it is something pertaining to this life. The subtle body lasts up to the attainment of Brahman. Pranas of the knower of the Nirguna Brahman do not depart from the individual soul, the soul passes out of the body with the Pranas which become merged in Brahman, and absolute non-distinction with Brahman takes place – अविभागः, वचनात् (Brahma Sutras IV.ii.16). The soul of the knower of the Saguna Brahman comes to the heart at the time of death and thence goes out through the Susumna; it then follows the rays of the sun after death and goes to Brahmaloka – रश्म्यनुसारी (Brahma Sutras VI.ii.18). The texts refer to different paths and give their descriptions but Badarayana tells us that they refer to and give only different particulars of the same path – अर्चिरादिना, तत्प्रथितेः (Brahma Sutras IV.iii.1)

== Impersonal immortality ==
Mundaka Upanishad (III.ii.6-9) states that at the supreme moment of final departure having become identified with the supreme Immortality (Brahman) they pure in mind become freed on every side. To their resources repair the fifteen constituents (of the body) and to their respective gods go all the gods (of the senses), and the karmas and the soul that stimulates the intellect, all become unified with the supreme Undecaying (परेऽव्यये). As rivers, flowing down, become indistinguishable on reaching the sea by giving up their names and forms, so also the illumined soul, having become freed from name and form, reaches the self-effulgent Purusa that is higher than the higher Immutable; this Self is not attained by one devoid of strength, nor through delusion, nor through knowledge unassociated with monasticism, but the Self of that knower, who strives through these means, enters into the abode that is Brahman (ब्रह्मधाम). This is absorption in divinity, this is the Doctrine of Impersonal Immortality. Kaushitaki Upanishad (I.4) tells us that when the soul comes to the Path of the Gods, the soul first goes to the world of Fire, then to the world of the Wind, to the world of Varuna, to that of the Sun, of Indra, of Prajapati, and finally to the world of Brahman. The soul knowing Brahman crosses the Ageless river merely by the motion of the mind and being free from good and free from evil moves towards Brahman.
