= Contents and stories of the Yoga Vasishtha =

The below list gives an overview of the contents and stories in the Yoga Vasistha, as it appears in Swami Venkatesananda's translation. The same stories are included in the Moksopaya, on which the Yoga Vasistha was based, as well.

In the beginning of the book Vasistha states that the stories have a "definite purpose and a limited intention. They are not to be taken literally, nor is their significance to be stretched beyond the intention."

== Section One: On Dispassion ==
The Yoga Vāsiṣṭha opens with the section Vairāgya-prakaraṇa ("On Dispassion"). It begins with prince Rama returning to Ayodhya after a pilgrimage.

Rāma, though a prince of Ayodhya, is described as being profoundly disenchanted with worldly life. He finds no joy in wealth, pleasure, or power, and expresses a sense of futility about existence itself.

Concerned at his condition, King Daśaratha seeks counsel from sage Vasiṣṭha. Before Vasiṣṭha replies, however, the sage Viśvāmitra intervenes, affirming that Rāma’s state is not delusion but genuine insight born of wisdom and dispassion.

This section concludes by setting the stage for the detailed dialogue between Rāma and Vasiṣṭha, where the path toward liberation through self-knowledge will be unfolded.

== Section Two: On the Behavior of a Seeker ==
- The Story of Śuka
- Self Effort

== Section Three: On Creation ==
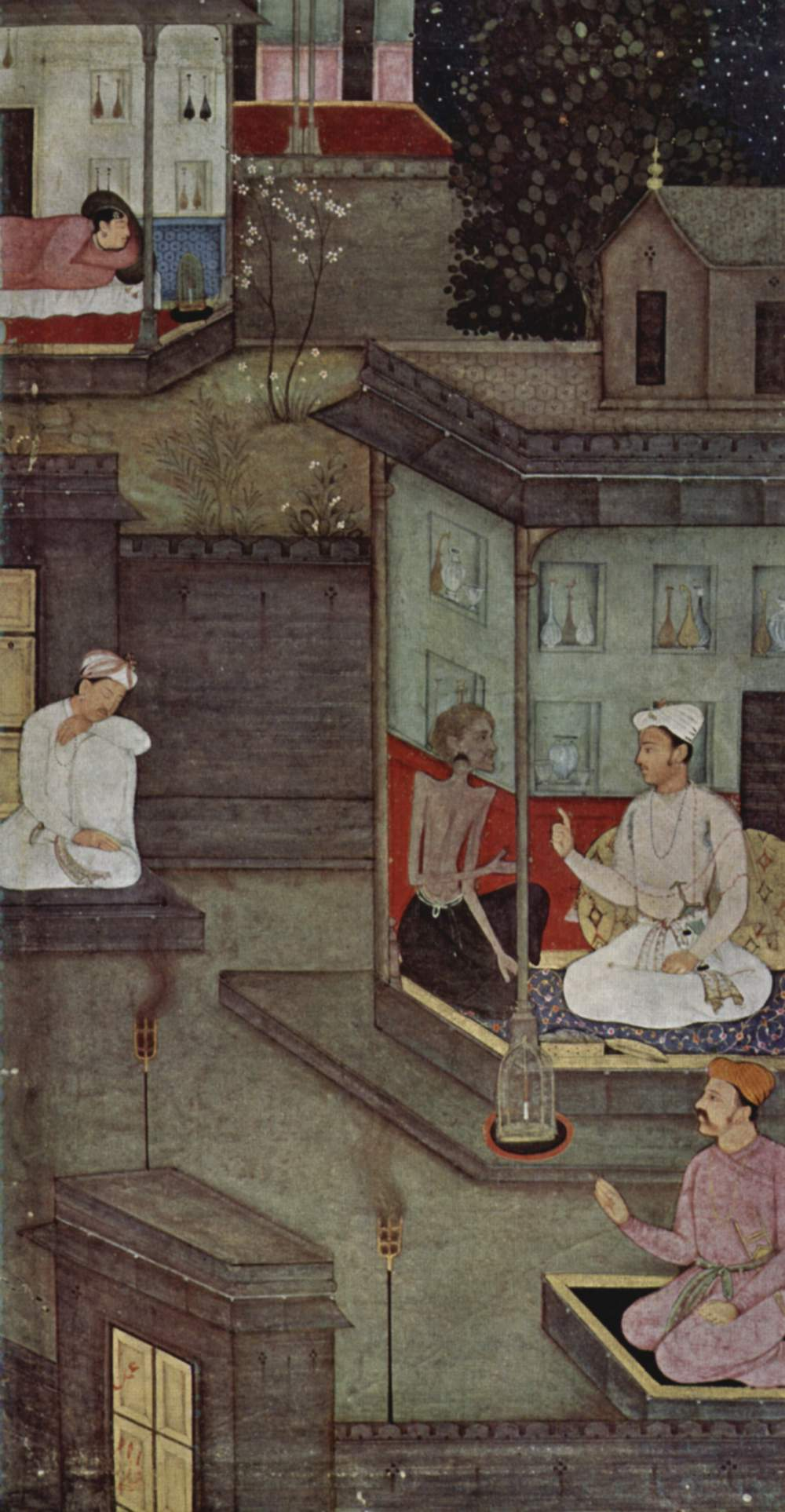
Karkati asks questions to the King of Kirata, from the Mughal Yoga Vasishta.

- The Story of Lila
- The Story of Karkati
- The Story of the Sons of Indu
- The Story of Ahalya
- The Story of the Great Forest
- The Story of the Three Non-Existent Princes
- The Story of Lavana

== Section Four: On Existence ==
- The Story of Sukra
- The Story of Dama, Vyala and Kata
- The Story of Bhima, Bhasa and Drdha
- The Story of Dasura
- Kaca’s Story

== Section Five: On Dissolution ==
- The Story of King Janaka
- The Story of Punya and Pavana
- The Story of Bali
- The Story of Prahlada
- The Story of Gadhi
- The Story of Uddalaka
- The Story of Suraghu
- The Story of Bhasa and Vilasa
- The Story of Vitahavya

== Section Six: On Liberation ==
- Discourse on Brahman
- The Story of Bhusunda
- Description of the Lord
- Deva Puja
- The Story of the Wood-apple
- The Story of the Rock
- The Story of Arjuna
- The Story of the Hundred Rudra
- The Story of the Vampire
- The Story of Bhagiratha
- The Story of Sikhidvaja and Cudala
- The Story of the Philosopher’s Stone
- The Story of the Foolish Elephant
- The Story of Kaca
- the Story of the Deluded Man
- The Story of Vipascit
- The Story of the Hunter and the Sage
- The World Within the Rock
- The Story of the Sage from Outer Space
- The Story of Bhrngisa
- The Story of lksvaku
- The Story of the Hunter and the Deer
- The Seven States of Yoga
