= Drsti-srsti subschool of Advaita Vedanta =

Hindu philosophical school

Drsti-srsti is a subschool of Advaita Vedanta, possibly started by Maṇḍana Miśra (8th c. CE). It holds that the "whole world of things is the object of mind," and influenced the Yoga Vasistha.

== Etymology ==
- dṛṣṭi - view, interpretation of experience
- sṛṣṭi - creation

== See also ==
- View (Buddhism)
