= Kriyamana karma =

Spiritual principle in Hinduism

Kriyamana karma, in Hinduism, is the karma that human beings are creating in the present, the fruits of which will be experienced in the future. These actions that are generated day-by-day may either join the prarabdha karma and become experienced in this very life or join the sanchita karma and become experienced in future lives. Kriyamana karma is the only karma that human beings have control over.

== Etymology ==
Kriyamana is derived from the Sanskrit root kri (to do, to act) and it means "being done". In literal terms, kriyamana karma translates to "being made or currently getting accumulated". The concept emphasizes actions being done in the present life, distinguishing them from Sanchita karma (accumulated past actions) and Prarabdha karma (predetermined destiny).

== See also ==
- Nishkam Karma
- Prarabdha karma
- Sanchita karma
