= Yoga Vasishtha =

Text with a philosophical foundation similar to Advaita Vedanta

Yoga Vasishtha (Sanskrit: योगवासिष्ठम्, IAST: yoga-vāsiṣṭham; also known as Mokṣopāya or Mokṣopāyaśāstra, and as Maha-Ramayana, Arsha Ramayana, Vasiṣṭha Ramayana, Yogavasistha-Ramayana and Jnanavasistha, is a historically popular and influential syncretic philosophical text of Hinduism, dated to the 11th to 14th century CE.

According to Mainkar, writing in 1977, the text started as an Upanishad, which developed into the Laghu Vasistha, incorporating Buddhist ideas, and then, between 1150 and 1250, the Yoga Vasistha, incorporating Shaivite Trika ideas. According to Slaje, writing in the 2000s, the Mokṣopāya was written in Kashmir in the 10th century. According to Hanneder and Slaje, the Mokṣopāya was later (11th to the 14th century) modified, showing influences from the Saivite Trika school, resulting in the Yogavāsiṣṭha, which became an orthodox text in Advaita Vedanta.

The text is attributed to Maharishi Valmiki, but the real author is unknown. It is named after sage Vasistha who is mentioned and revered in the seventh book of the Rigveda. The complete text contains over 29,000 verses, while the short version of the text, called Laghu Yogavāsiṣṭham, contains 6,000 verses, translated into Persian by the 15th-century.

The text has a philosophical foundation similar to Advaita Vedanta, and expounds the principles of Maya and Brahman, as well as the principles of non-duality. and its discussion of Yoga. The text is structured as a discourse of sage Vasistha to Prince Rama, and consists of six books, describing the search for liberation through self-effort and meditation, and presenting cosmology and metaphysical teachings of existence embedded in stories and fables.

== Text ==
=== Nomenclature ===
The long version of the text is called Brihat Yoga Vasistha, wherein Brihat means "great or large". The longer version is also referred to simply as Yoga Vasistha and by numerous other names such as Vasiṣṭha Ramayana. The short version of the text is called Laghu Yoga Vasishta, wherein Laghu means "short or small". S. N. Dasgupta takes the Laghu-Yogavāsiṣṭha to be a later summary of the Yogavāsiṣṭha.

The Yoga Vasistha Sara, "The Essence of Yoga Vasishta," is a condensation of the Yoga Vasishta in 230 couplets.

The name Vasistha in the title of the text refers to Rishi Vasistha. The term yoga in the text refers to the underlying yogic theme in its stories and dialogues, and the term is used in a generic sense to include all forms of yoga in the pursuit of liberation, in the style of Bhagavad Gita. The word is formed like this: vasu + iṣṭha, the superlative "most excellent" (with vasu taken as "excellent"), or "best of the Vasus, elemental deities". The ending -u is dropped following a rule of Panini, when joining the words.

=== Dating and development ===
Human effort can be used for self-betterment and that there is no such thing as an external fate imposed by the gods.

— Yoga Vasistha philosophy, Christopher Chapple

The Yoga Vasistha is traditionally attributed to Maharishi Valmiki, the author of the Ramayana. However, scholars are uncertain about the exact authorship and date of composition. Estimates range, states Chapple, writing in 1984, from "as early as the sixth or seventh century, to as late as the fourteenth century". It is likely that the text evolved over several centuries, reaching its current form between the 10th and 14th centuries, incorporating influences from various Indian philosophical traditions, including Buddhism, Jainism, and Kashmiri Shaivism."

==== References to contemporaries ====
The surviving text mentions Vijnanavada and Madhyamaka schools of Buddhism by name, suggesting that the corresponding sections were composed after those schools were established, or about 5th-century. The translation of a version of the text in 14th- to 15th-century into Persian, has been the basis of the other limit, among scholars such as Farquhar in 1922.

Atreya in 1935 suggested that the text must have preceded Gaudapada and Adi Shankara, because it does not use their terminology, but does mention many Buddhist terms. Dasgupta, a contemporary of Atreya, states that the text includes verses of earlier text, such as its III.16.50 is identical to one found in Kalidasa's Kumarasambhava, thus the text must be placed after the 5th-century. Dasgupta adds that the philosophy and ideas presented in Yoga Vasistha mirror those found in Advaita Vedanta of Adi Shankara, but neither mention the other, which probably means that the author(s) of Yoga Vasistha were scholars who lived in the same century as Shankara, placing the text in about 7th- to early 8th-century. The shorter summary version of the text is attributed to the Kashmiri scholar Abhinanda, who has been variously dated to have lived in 9th- or 10th-century.

==== Slaje and Hanneder ====
According to Slaje, the Mokṣopāya was written on the Pradyumna hill in Śrīnagar, Kashmir, in the 10th century. a dating also accepted by Leslie. According to Hanneder and Slaje, the Mokṣopāya was later (11th to the 14th century) modified, showing influences from the Saivite Trika school, resulting in the Yogavāsiṣṭha, which became an orthodox text in Advaita Vedanta.

==== Mainkar's evolving text theory ====
Mainkar, writing in 1977, argues that Yoga Vasistha probably evolved over time. The first work, states Mainkar, was the original ancient work of Vasistha that was an Upanishad with Brahamanical ideas, a work that is lost. This text, suggests Mainkar, was expanded into the Laghu Vasistha. The Laghu (shorter) version was then expanded into the full editions. The syncretic incorporation of Buddhism, Jainism and Hinduism ideas happened in the Laghu-Yogavasistha edition, states Mainkar, while ideas from Kashmiri Shaivism, particularly the Trika school, were added to the growing version by the 12th-century. Similar serial expansion, revisions and interpolation is typical in Indian literature. Peter Thomi has published additional evidence in support Mainkar's theory on Yoga Vasistha's chronology.

=== Composition ===
==== Number of verses ====
The text exists in many editions of manuscripts with varying number of verses, but similar message. The full editions contain over 29,000, to a few with 32,000 verses, and in some editions about 36,000 verses. The Nirnaya Sagar version of Yoga Vasistha manuscript has 1146 verses in the first Book, 807 in second, 6304 verses in third, 2414 verses in the fourth book, 4322 in the fifth, while the last is longest with 14,296 verses, for a cumulative total of 29,289 verses. An abridged version by Abhinanda of Kashmir (son of Jayanta Bhatta) is Laghu ("Little") Yogavasistha and contains 6,000 verses.

==== Structure ====
The verses of Yoga Vasistha are structured in the genre of ancient Indian literature, called Grantha. In this genre, each Shloka (verse) in the text is designed to equal 32 syllables, while conveying its message. A Grantha can be sung and depending on its meter, set to specific Raga music. This genre is found in Bhakti movement literature, and Yoga Vasistha's Advaita theories and monism influenced the Grantha literature of Sikhism, whose primary scripture is called Guru Granth Sahib.

== Content ==
Gentle enquiry

You should either through yourself, or the aid of the exalted ones, be ceaselessly engaged in the pursuit of this gentle enquiry,
Who am I? What is this [U]niverse?
It is this true enquiry alone that generates Jnana (knowledge).

— Yoga Vasistha

This is one of the longest Hindu texts in Sanskrit after the Mahabharata, and an important text of Yoga. It consists of numerous short stories and anecdotes used to help illustrate its ideas and message. In terms of Hindu mythology, the conversation in the Yoga Vasishta is placed chronologically before the Ramayana.

The traditional belief is that reading this book leads to spiritual liberation. The conversation between Vasistha and Prince Rama is that between a great, enlightened sage and a seeker of liberation. The text discusses consciousness, cosmology, nature of the universe and consciousness, the ultimate dissolution of body, the liberation of the soul and the non-dual nature of existence.

=== Books ===
The text consists of six books:

- Vairagya-prakaranam (Dispassion): This book introduces Prince Rama's existential crisis, highlighting the transient nature of life and human suffering.
- Mumukshuvayahara-prakaranam (Behavior of the Seeker): It focuses on the qualities required for spiritual liberation, emphasizing self-effort and the desire for moksha (liberation).
- Utpatti-prakaranam (Arising and Birth): This section delves into cosmology and the spiritual awakening of Rama, exploring the origins of the universe and consciousness.
- Sthiti-prakaranam (Existence and Settling): The text discusses the nature of existence, free will, and human creativity, presenting numerous stories to illustrate these concepts.
- Upashama-prakaranam (Tranquility): This book explores the practice of meditation and the dissolution of dualistic thought, guiding the seeker toward inner peace.
- Nirvana-prakaranam (Liberation): The final book describes the state of enlightenment achieved by Rama, offering insights into the experience of nirvana and the nature of ultimate reality.

=== Influences ===
The Yoga Vasistha is a syncretic work, containing elements of Advaita Vedanta, Yoga, Samkhya, Jainism, Pratyabhijña, Saivite Trika, and Mahayana Buddhism, thus making it, according to Chapple, "a Hindu text par excellence, including, as does Hinduism, a mosaic-style amalgam of diverse and sometimes opposing traditions".

=== On Human Intellect ===
The Yoga Vāsiṣṭha states the following on the credibility of the provider and seeker of knowledge through these words.

'Even a young boy's words are to be accepted if they are words of wisdom, else, reject it like straw even if uttered by Brahmā the creator.'

=== On who is ready for spiritual knowledge ===
The Yoga Vasistha states that there are four characteristics that mark someone ready for spiritual journey who:

1. Senses the difference between Atman (soul) and non-atman
2. Is past cravings for anyone or anything, is indifferent to the enjoyments of objects in this world or after
3. Is virtuous and ethical with Sama (equality), Dama (self-restraint, temperance), Uparati (quietism), Titiksha (patience, endurance), Sandhana (uniting, peace) and Sraddha (faith, trust)
4. Has Mumukshatva, that is longing for meaning in life and liberation

=== On the process of spiritual knowledge ===
Yoga Vasistha teachings are divided into six parts: dispassion, qualifications of the seeker, creation, existence, dissolution and liberation. It sums up the spiritual process in the seven Bhoomikas:

1. Śubhecchā (longing for the Truth): The yogi (or sādhaka) rightly distinguishes between permanent and impermanent; cultivates dislike for worldly pleasures; acquires mastery over his physical and mental faculties; and feels a deep yearning to be free from Saṃsāra.
2. Vicāraṇa (right inquiry): The yogi has pondered over what he or she has read and heard, and has realized it in his or her life.
3. Tanumānasa (attenuation – or thinning out – of mental activities): The mind abandons the many, and remains fixed on the One.
4. Sattvāpatti (attainment of sattva, "reality"): The Yogi, at this stage, is called Brahmavid ("knower of Brahman"). In the previous four stages, the yogi is subject to sañcita, Prārabdha and Āgamī forms of karma. He or she has been practicing Samprajñāta Samādhi (contemplation), in which the consciousness of duality still exists.
5. Asaṃsakti (unaffected by anything): The yogi (now called Brahmavidvara) performs his or her necessary duties, without a sense of involvement.
6. Padārtha abhāvana (sees Brahman everywhere): External things do not appear to exist to the yogi (now called Brahmavidvarīyas); in essence there is a non-cognition of 'objects' as the separation between subject and a distinct object is dissolved; and tasks get performed without any sense of agency (doership). Sañcita and Āgamī karma are now destroyed; only a small amount of Prārabdha karma remains.
7. Turīya (perpetual samādhi): The yogi is known as Brahmavidvariṣṭha and does not perform activities, either by his will or the promptings of others.

=== On liberation ===
In Chapter 2 of Book VI, titled as The story of Ikshvaku, the text explains the state of Nirvana (liberation) as follows, "Liberation is peace. Liberation is extinction of all conditioning. Liberation is freedom from every kind of physical, psychological and psychic distress. This world is not seen by the ignorant and the wise in the same light. To one who has attained self-knowledge, this world does not appear as samsara, but as the one infinite and indivisible consciousness".

=== On Jivanmukta ===
The Yoga Vasistha describes the Jivanmukta, or liberated person, as follows (abridged from the 1896 translation by KN Aiyar):

- He associates with the wise. He has reached the state of mind, which sees happiness everywhere. To him, neither sacrificial fires, nor Tapas, nor bounteous gifts nor holy waters have any meaning. He is replete with wisdom and friendly to all.
- He is desireless and in his eyes there is nothing supernatural. His state is indescribable and yet he will move in the world like anybody else. His mind will not be bound by any longings after Karmas. He will be indifferent to joy or pains arising from good or bad results. He will preserve a pleasant position in the happy enjoyment of whatever he obtains.
- He is never affected by anything, whether he is in a state of Jiva consciousness or state of Shiva devoid of the Jiva consciousness.
- He is same whether he moves in a family or is a solitary recluse.
- He feels unbound by the delusions of Srutis and Smritis.
- Nothing matters to him, he is unaffected by griefs or pleasures. He is distant, he is close, he in the one Reality of Atman. He is neither clingy nor arrogant.
- He has no fear of anyone, no anger against anyone.
- When the attraction towards external objects ceases, then there yet remains the internal craving which is called Trishna (thirst). The Jivanmukta is beyond Trishna. He is, not becoming. He does not even long for salvation. He is content.
- A Jivanmukta will always transact his present duties, but neither longs for things in the future, nor ruminates upon things of the past.
- He is a child amongst children; as old men amongst the old; as the puissant amongst the puissant; as a youth amongst the young, compassionate and understanding with the grieved.
- In him is found nobleness, benevolence, love, clearness of intellect.

=== On Samsara and reality ===
11. There are three benefits derived from the study of books, from lectures of a preceptor, and from one's own industry, all of which are attendant on our exertions and not destiny.
12. This is the long and short of all the Shastras, that diligence preserves our minds from all evils, by employing them to whatever is good and right.
13. To apply with diligence to whatever is excellent, not low nor mean and not liable to loss or decay, is the precept of parents and preceptors to their sons and pupils.
14. I get the immediate fruit of my labor in proportion to my exertion, hence I say, I enjoy the fruit of my labor and not of fortune.
15. Activity gives us success and it is this that elevates the intelligent.

— Yoga Vasistha 2.7.11-2.7.15

The Yoga Vasistha describes samsara and reality as follows:

- Samsara is mundane existence with rebirths.
- The universe is full of Samsara driven by Moha (delusion), bondage, Tamas (destructive, chaotic behaviors), Mala (impurity), Avidya and Maya.
- Ignorance feeds samsara, self-knowledge liberates.
- Samsara is ephemeral and unreal. With birth, death is inevitable.

== Commentaries ==
The following traditional Sanskrit commentaries on the Yoga Vasistha are extant:

- Vāsiṣṭha-rāmāyaṇa-candrikā by Advayāraṇya (son of Narahari)
- Tātparya prakāśa by ānanda Bodhendra Sarasvatī
- Bhāṣya by Gaṅgādharendra
- Pada candrikā by Mādhava Sarasvatī

== Influence ==
The Yoga Vasistha is a key text for understanding the late medieval synthesis of various Indian philosophical traditions. The Yoga Vasistha, states David Gordon White, was one of the popular texts on Yoga that dominated the Indian Yoga culture scene before the 12th-century. It has, states White, served as a reference on Yoga for medieval era Advaita Vedanta scholars. According to Ayer, it is particularly associated with drsti-srsti subschool of Advaita which holds that the "whole world of things is the object of mind".

The practice of atma-vichara, "self-enquiry," described in the Yoga Vasistha, has been popularised due to the influence of Ramana Maharshi, who was strongly influenced by this text.

== Translations ==
=== Indian languages ===
Originally written in Sanskrit, the Yoga Vasistha has been translated into many Indian languages, and the stories are told to children in various forms. There are multiple collections of audio, video and mini-articles available on the scripture.

==== Telugu translations ====
Complete translation
- Vasishtha Rama Samvaadam, Sri Yeleswarapu Hanuma Ramakrishna.
- Yogavasishtha hridayamu in seven Parts by Kuppa Venkata Krishnamurthy, also rendered into English by Vemuri Ramesam.
- Yoga Vasistha Ratnakaram, Swami Vidya Prakashananda Giri
Copies of the Telugu and English versions were also published by Avadhoota Datta Peetham, Mysore 570025, India

==== Kannada Translations ====
- Yogavasista Set Of 8 Vols - is a translation and commentary in Kannada by Devudu Narasimha Shastry published by Hemantha Sahithya
- Yogavasista - is an abridged translation and commentary in Kannada by Nagesh R Kulkarni published by Samaja Pustakalaya

==== Malayalam Translations ====
- Vasishtasudha - Yogavasishtasaram is a translation and commentary in Malayalam by Professor G Balakrishnan Nair

=== Persian ===
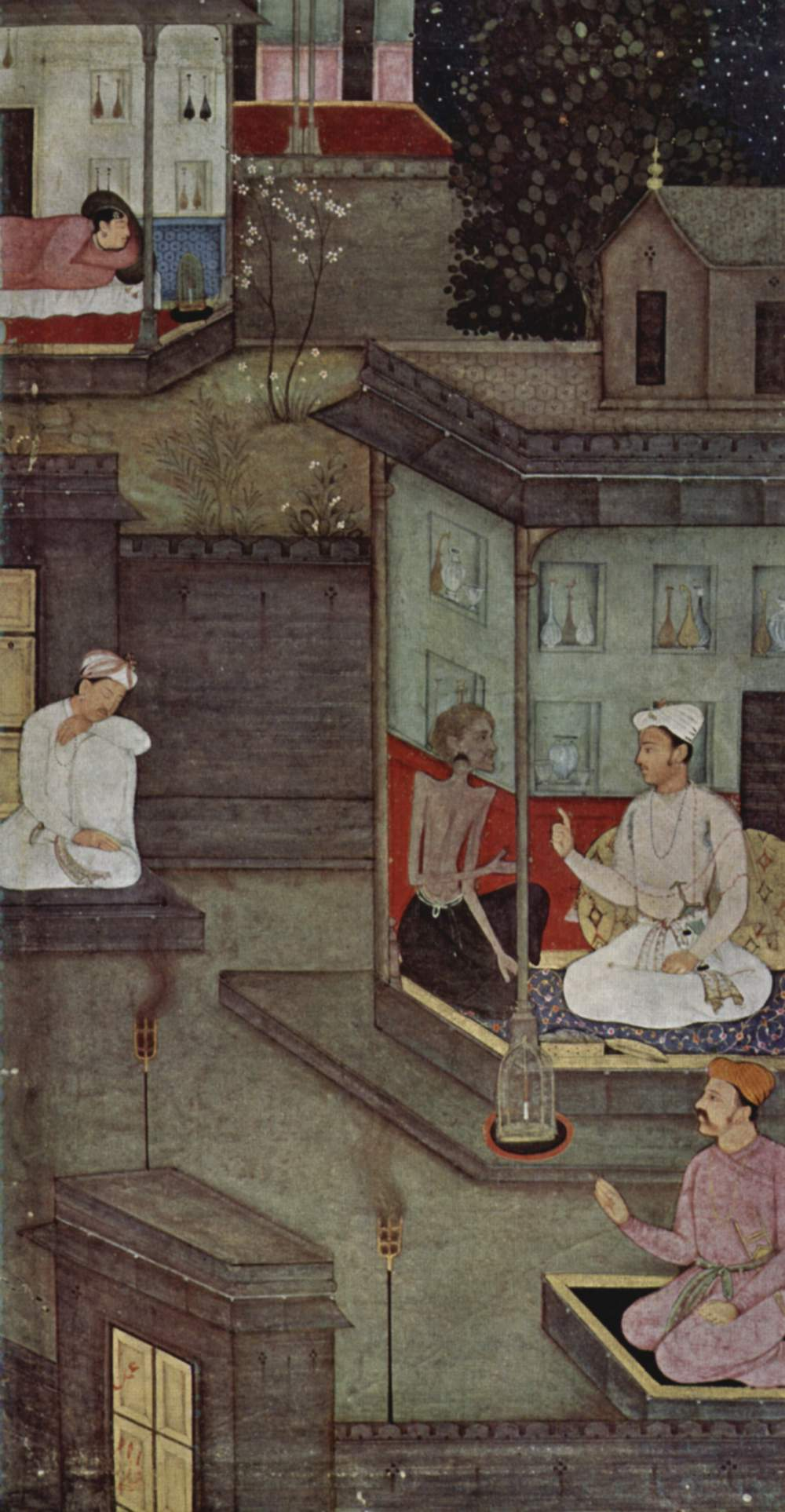
A painting from the Persian translation of Yoga Vasistha manuscript, 1602

During the Mughal Dynasty the text was translated into Persian several times, as ordered by Akbar, Jahangir and Darah Shikuh. One of these translations was undertaken by Nizam al-Din Panipati in the late sixteenth century AD. This translation, known as the Jug-Basisht, which has since become popular in Persia among intellectuals interested in Indo-Persian culture. The Safavid-era mystic Mir Findiriski (d. 1641) commented on selected passages of Jug-Basisht.

=== Russian ===
The unabridged text is currently being translated into Russian and published by Swamini Vidyananda Saraswati, first five books are completed by 2017.

=== English translations ===
Yoga Vasistha was translated into English by Swami Jyotirmayananda, Swami Venkatesananda, Vidvan Bulusu Venkateswaraulu and Vihari Lal Mitra. K. Naryanaswami Aiyer translated the well-known abridged version, Laghu-Yoga-Vasistha. In 2009, Swami Tejomayananda's Yoga Vasistha Sara Sangrah was published by the Central Chinmaya Mission Trust. In this version the Laghu-Yoga-Vasistha has been condensed to 86 verses, arranged into seven chapters. A list of all known English translations follows:

1) Complete translation
- The Yoga-Vásishtha-Mahárámáyana of Válmiki, Translated by Vihārilāla Mitra (1891-1899), OCLC 6953699
- The Yoga-Vasishtha Maharamayana of Valmiki in 4 vols. in 7 pts. (bound in 4). Translated by Vihari-Lala Mitra. Reprinted in LPP (Low Price Publications), New Delhi, 1999. ISBN 81-7536-179-4 (set)
- Yoga Vasishtha of Valmiki (4 volumes & unabridged). Translated by Vihārilāla Mitra (1891-1899). Edited by Dr. Ravi Prakash Arya (1st. ed. 1998), to include Sanskrit text with english translation. Parimal Publications, Delhi.
- Yoga Vasishtha of Valmiki, The original Sanskrit attributed to Valmiki translated lo English by Vihari Laia Mitra. Edited by edited by Thomas L. Palotas.

2) Abbreviated versions
- Vālmīki (1896). Yoga-Vâsishta: Laghu, the Smaller. trans. K Nārāyaṇaswāmi Aiyar. Madras: Thompson and Co. p. 346 pages. OCLC 989105.
- Venkatesananda, Swami (1993). Vasiṣṭha's Yoga. Albany: State University of New York Press. p. 768. ISBN 0-585-06801-1. OCLC 43475324. Abbreviated to about one-third of the original work.
- Venkatesananda, Swami (1984). The Concise Yoga Vāsiṣṭha. Albany: State University of New York Press. p. 430. ISBN 0-87395-955-8. OCLC 11044869. A shorter version of the above.
- The Essence of Yogavaasishtha [Sri Vasishthasangraha]. Compiled by Sri Jnanananda Bharati. Translated by Samvid. Samata Books 1982, 2002. ISBN 81-85208-14-X. Printed in India. 344 pp.
- Yoga Vasishta Sara (The Essence of Yoga Vasishta). An English Translation from the Sanskrit Original. Sri Ramanasramam, Tiruvannamalai, 1973, 2005. ISBN 81-88018-45-7. 36 pp.
- The Essence of Yogavaasishtha. Compiled by Sri Jnanananda Bharati. Translated by Samvid. Samata Books 1982, 2002. ISBN 81-85208-14-X. 344 pp.
- Tejomayananda, Swami: Yoga Vasishta Sara Sangraha. Central Chinmaya Mission Trust, Mumbai 1998
- Jyotirmayananda, Swami: Yoga Vasistha. Vol. 1–5. Yoga Research Foundation, Miami 1977. http://www.yrf.org
- Abhinanda, Pandita (2003). The Yoga Vasishta (Abridged Version). trans. K.N. Subramanian. Chennai: Sura Books. p. 588 pages. ISBN 9788174784223.
- Vālmīki (1930). Yoga Vashisht or Heaven Found. trans. Rishi Singh Gherwal. Santa Barbara, USA: Author. p. 185 pages.

=== Portuguese translations ===
Yoga Vasistha was translated in 2018, from English into Portuguese by Eleonora Meier for Satsang Editora (Brazilian publisher) of the version of Swami Venkatesananda and it is available at www.lojasatsangeditora.com.br - ISBN 978-85-92598-26-6 - Páginas: 848 Swami Venkatesananda.

=== Latvian ===
Vāsišthas joga. Svami Venkatesananda, 2020, 630 pp. A Latvian translation by Inese Kausa, publisher www.svami.lv

== See also ==
- Valmiki
- Vasistha
- Valmiki Samhita
- Maithili Maha Upanishad
- Vaishnava Matabja Bhaskara
- Ramayana

== Sources ==
- Aiyar, K. Narayanasvami, ed. (1975). Laghu-Yoga-Vāsiṣṭha. Madras: Theosophical Publishing House. ISBN 978-0-8356-7497-3.
- Chapple, Christopher (1984). "Introduction". The Concise Yoga Vāsiṣṭha. Translated by Venkatesananda, Swami. Albany: State University of New York Press. ISBN 0-87395-955-8. OCLC 11044869.
- Friesen, J. Glenn (2006), Ramana Maharshi: Hindu and non-Hindu Interpretations of a Jivanmukta
- Hanneder, Jürgen; Slaje, Walter (2005). "Mokṣopāya Project: Introduction". Archived from the original on 28 December 2005.
- Leslie, Julia (2003). Authority and meaning in Indian religions: Hinduism and the case of Vālmīki. Ashgate Publishing, Ltd. ISBN 0-7546-3431-0.
- Mainkar, T.G. (1977). The Vasistha Ramayana - A Study. Meharchand Lachhmandas. Oriental Booksellers & Publishers.
- Slaje, Walter (2005). "Locating the Mokṣopāya". In Hanneder, Jürgen (ed.). The Mokṣopāya, Yogavāsiṣṭha and Related Texts. Indologica Halensis. Geisteskultur Indiens. 7. Aachen: Shaker Verlag. ISBN 978-3-8322-4265-7.
- Slaje, Walter (2005b). "Locating the Mokṣopāya".
- various (1992). Encyclopaedia of Indian Literature, Volume 5. Sahitya Akademi. ISBN 81-260-1221-8.
