= Surrender (religion) =

Spiritual yielding to a dominating force

To surrender in spirituality and religion means that a believer completely gives up their own will and subjects his thoughts, ideas, and deeds to the will and teachings of a higher power. It may also be contrasted with submission. Surrender is willful acceptance and yielding to a dominating force and their will.

== Christianity ==
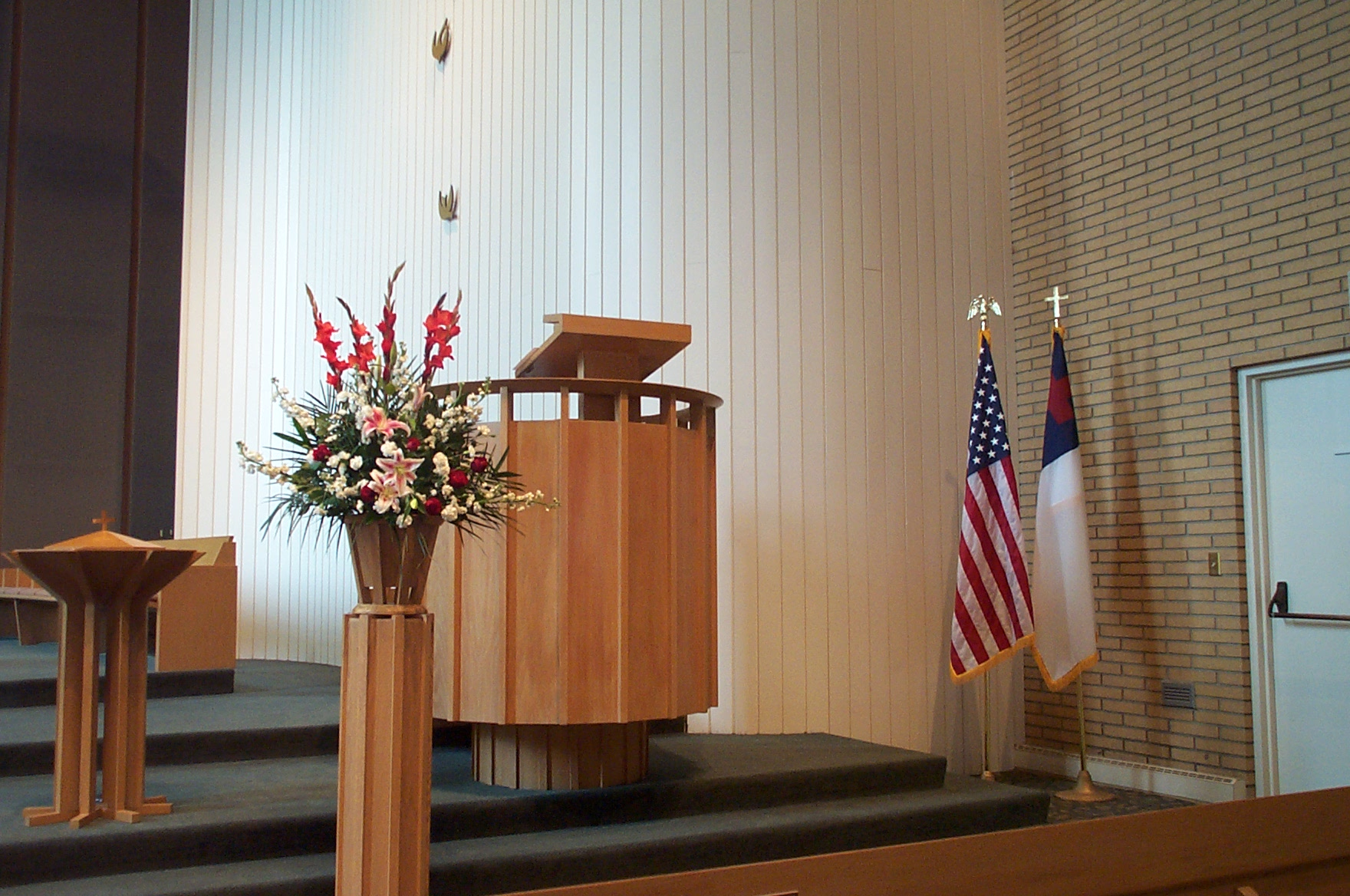
The Christian Flag, displayed next to the pulpit on the chancel of a church sanctuary. Its white field represents Jesus' surrender to God's will.

In Christianity, the first main principle of surrender is "Dying to Self", or "The Carrying of Your Cross", allowing Christ to reign and rule in the order of how one's life is carried out, illustrated in the following passages:

Then said Jesus unto his disciples, If any [man] will come after me let him deny himself, and take up his cross, and follow me.

— Matthew 16:24

Greater love hath no man than this, that a man lay down his life for his friends.

— John 15:13

And walk in love, as Christ also hath loved us, and hath given himself for us an offering and a sacrifice to God for a sweetsmelling savour.

— Eph 5:2

Another principle central to the Christian concept of surrender is the concept of surrender to God's Will. Surrendering to God's will entails both the surrender of our will to His, in His sovereignty over all things, in which His ways of operating and thinking prevails over humanity's and Satan's. Secondarily, the surrender of one's will is evidenced by the acknowledgement of God's will for our personal lives in even the smallest decisions. This is done through putting personal desire aside in favor of God's perfect will for our lives. This includes the reality of an acceptance to a calling or purpose. The precipice or essentiality of this personal surrender is obedience, and obedience to God is an indication of bringing about His will which, having lasting effects through generations and in kingdoms/nations, is often associated with earthly and heavenly blessings.

The ultimate surrender, the surrender of Christ, which is a fully submitted will to God's Divine plan, is seen in Christ's birth as well as His final three prayers, in Gethsemane, before His crucifixion. The coming into the world as God incarnate and then the surrender to the Cross/His life in the act of sacrificial atonement, breaking the curse of sin and death from the Fall.

This is evidenced in the following:

But made himself of no reputation, and took upon him the form of a servant, and was made in the likeness of men: And being found in fashion as a man, he humbled himself, and became obedient unto death, even the death of the cross.

— Phl 2:7-8

Saying, Father, if thou be willing, remove this cup from me: nevertheless not my will, but thine, be done.

— Luke 22:42

Surrender is also noted in Christian doctrine as one of the three columns of victorious living, or Christian victory: the Blood of the Lamb [Christ], their Testimony of the Word of God [Scriptures] and their lives, and Loving not their own lives to death; that Christ's life may be shown.

Surrender is a major principle in Anabaptism and has been practiced for hundreds of years. You can see examples of this in many anabaptist groups such as the Amish, Mennonites, Bruderhof and Brethren groups in aspects of their life such as dress, possessions hospitality and other factors.

The Christian Flag, which represents all of Christendom, has a white field, with a red Latin cross inside a blue canton. In conventional vexillology, a white flag is linked to surrender, a reference to the Biblical description of Jesus' non-violence and surrender to God's will.

== Hinduism ==
According to the Bhagavad Gita, Krishna said the following to the warrior Arjuna, who became his disciple:

I consider the yogi-devotee—who lovingly contemplates on Me with supreme faith, and whose mind is ever absorbed in Me—to be the best of all the yogis.

— Chapter 6, Verse 47

After attaining Me, the great souls do not incur rebirth in this miserable transitory world, because they have attained the highest perfection.

— Chapter 8, Verse 15

... those who, renouncing all actions in Me, and regarding Me as the Supreme, worship Me... For those whose thoughts have entered into Me, I am soon the deliverer from the ocean of death and transmigration, Arjuna. Keep your mind on Me alone, your intellect on Me. Thus you shall dwell in Me hereafter.

— Chapter 12, Verses 6-8

And he who serves Me with the yoga of unswerving devotion, transcending these qualities [binary opposites, like good and evil, pain and pleasure] is ready for liberation in Brahman.

— Chapter 14, Verse 26

Fix your mind on Me, be devoted to Me, offer service to Me, bow down to Me, and you shall certainly reach Me. I promise you because you are My very dear friend.

— Chapter 18, Verse 65

Abandon all varieties of religion and just surrender unto Me. I shall deliver you from all sinful reactions. Do not fear.

— Chapter 18, Verse 66

Several gurus teach their disciples the importance of surrender to God or to themselves, as part of the guru-disciple relationship. For example, the Sri Sai Satcharita, the biography of Sai Baba of Shirdi says that surrender to the guru is the only sadhana.

Prem Rawat, formerly called Guru Maharaj Ji, was quoted in 1978, "But there is nothing to understand! And if there is something to understand, there is only one thing to understand, and that is to surrender!"

Contrary to the notion of surrendering onto God, Krishna in Bhagavad Gita also advises his followers to question everything in pursuit of absolute truth.

Accepting the importance of self-realization; and philosophical search for the Absolute Truth -- all these I declare to be knowledge, and besides this whatever there may be is ignorance.

— Chapter 13, Verse 12

== Islam ==
The word "islam" means "submission" or "surrender" to the will of Allah (God), its derived linguistic meaning comes from the Arabic triliteral root s-l-m (س-ل-م). This is the same root for the word "salam", which means "peace". So the word "islam" translates practically to achieving peace through obedience and surrender to God's will. A Muslim ("muslim"; the active participle of the word "islam") is a person who follows this path, meaning "one who submits" to God.

The concept of surrender is when a person abides by the five main Pillars of Islam. Following the faith means surrendering or submitting one's will to God. This means that Muslims in their daily life should strive for excellence under the banner of God's will. Every single action in a Muslim's life who has attained to a state of ʾiḥsān, is for the sake of Allah (God).

== See also ==
- Saranagati
- Ibadah
