= Sanchita karma =

Type of karma in Hinduism

In Hinduism, Sanchita karma (heaped together) is one of the three kinds of karma. It is the accumulation of one's past karmas – all actions, good and bad, from one's past embodiments that are stored in one's subconscious. Sanchita karmas follow through to the next life.

A part of the Sanchita karmas that has reached fructification, called Prarabdha karma, will determine the body form that the spiritual entity will assume to experience them so also the friends, relatives and life partner you get.

== In scriptures ==
=== Brahma Sutras ===
Brahma Sutras 4.1.13 states that when knowledge of Brahman (vidya) is attained, "all sins which are committed in the past life and which constitute the Sanchita Karmas are totally destroyed". This destruction happens because of knowledge, which is like a fire that completely burns up a dry reed, symbolizing the total elimination of accumulated karmas. Brahma Sutras 4.1.15 further clarifies that "only the immature Karmas of the former lives, namely, those Karmas whose effect has not yet begun, are destroyed by knowledge". This means a Jnanin (one who has attained the knowledge of Brahman) continues to live to exhaust their Prarabdha karma, even after Sanchita karma is nullified.

== See also ==
- Karma in Hinduism
- Kriyamana karma
