= Venkatesananda Saraswati =

- Born: 29 December 1921; Tanjore, Tamil Nadu
- Died: 2 December 1982 (aged 60); Johannesburg, South Africa
- Occupation(s): Saint, Monk, Teacher, Author, Biographer

Venkatesananda Saraswati (or Swami Venkatesananda; 29 December 1921 in Tanjore, South India – 2 December 1982 in Johannesburg, South Africa), known previously as Parthasarathy, was a disciple of Sivananda Saraswati. He received his spiritual training at the Divine Life Society in Rishikesh, India, and disseminated his master's teachings in South Africa, Mauritius, Australia, and New Zealand.

Venkatesananda said that he had been specially commissioned by his master, Sivananda, to spread the gospel of goodness – the four words: "Be good, do Good".

Swami Venkatesananda is also referred to as Siva-Pada-Renu (dust of Siva's feet), a title conferred to him by Swami Sivananda, his guru.

== Bibliography ==
- Venkatesananda, Swami (1974), Swami Venkatesananda in Albany, 1974, Integral Yoga Association of W.A
- Jyoti (1983), A few precious days with Swami Venkatesananda: as recalled, Jyoti
- Venkatesananda, Swami (1971), Talks given by Swami Venkatesananda in April, 1971 at Perth, Western Australia, [Swami Vankatesananda's friends and devotees as an expression of their love and gratitude]
- Haridas, Anand Swami (1980), An introduction to the Supreme yoga: a translation by Swami Venkatesananda of the Yoga Vasistha, School of Human Communication, Murdoch University, ISBN 978-0-86905-068-2
- Venkatesananda, Swami (1972), The song of God (3rd ed. Rev. & enl ed.), Chiltern Yoga Trust
- Venkatesananda, Swami (1970), Swami speaks: aspects of yoga, M.G.A. Publications
- Venkatesananda, Swami (1985), All about Sivananda, Divine Life Society
- Venkatesananda, Swami (1970), Bhakti Yoga: the path of god-love (2nd ed.), The Chiltern Yoga Trust
- Venkatesananda, Swami (1968), Srimad Bhagavad Gita for your daily life, Sivananda-Adhwaryoo
- Venkatesananda, Swami (1966), The ancient religion: a new look, N. Srinivasan
- Venkatesananda, Swami (1956), Sivananda's integral Yoga, The Yoga-Vedanta Forest University
- Venkatesananda, Swami; Lakshmi (1975), Beyond time and space: a series of talks on the Yoga Vasistha, Chiltern Yoga Trust
- Venkatesananda, Swami; Venkataramani, Swami (1988), Multiple reflections: talks on the yoga Vasistha, Chiltern Yoga Trust, ISBN 978-0-9612762-1-8
- Venkatesananda, Swami (1976), The story of Rama: a new, novel and challenging presentation of the original Ramayana of Valmiki, Chiltern Yoga Trust
- Venkatesananda, Swami; Integral Yoga Association of W.A (1974), Look within: talks on the Bhagavad Gita, The Association
- Venkatesananda, Swami; Integral Yoga Association of Western Australia (1975), Stop that sorrow before it gets you, South Fremantle
- Venkatesananda, Swami; Melvin, Terence; Hamsa, Swami; Chiltern Yoga Foundation (1983), Christ, Krishna, and you, Chiltern Yoga Foundation, ISBN 978-0-9612762-0-1
- Yogavasistharamayana; Venkatesananda, Swami (1976), The supreme Yoga: a new translation of the Yoga Vasistha, The Chiltern Yoga Trust, ISBN 978-0-620-02055-8
- From the ridiculous to the sublime, Chiltern Yoga Trust, 1991?, 1991, ISBN 978-0-9590690-4-4
- Chidananda, Swami; Divine Life Society (India) (1960), Life of Swami Sadananda, Yoga Vedanta Forest Academy
- Charles, Koilpillai J; Parashuraman, K. G (1973), The power of negative thinking and other parables from India, Orient Longman
- Venkatesananda, Swami (2001), YOGA SUTRAS OF PATANJALI, THE DIVINE LIFE SOCIETY, ISBN 81-7052-142-4
