= Karma =

Concept about individuals' intent and actions influencing those individuals' future

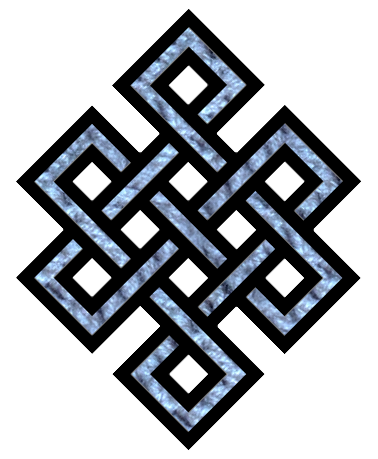
Endless knot

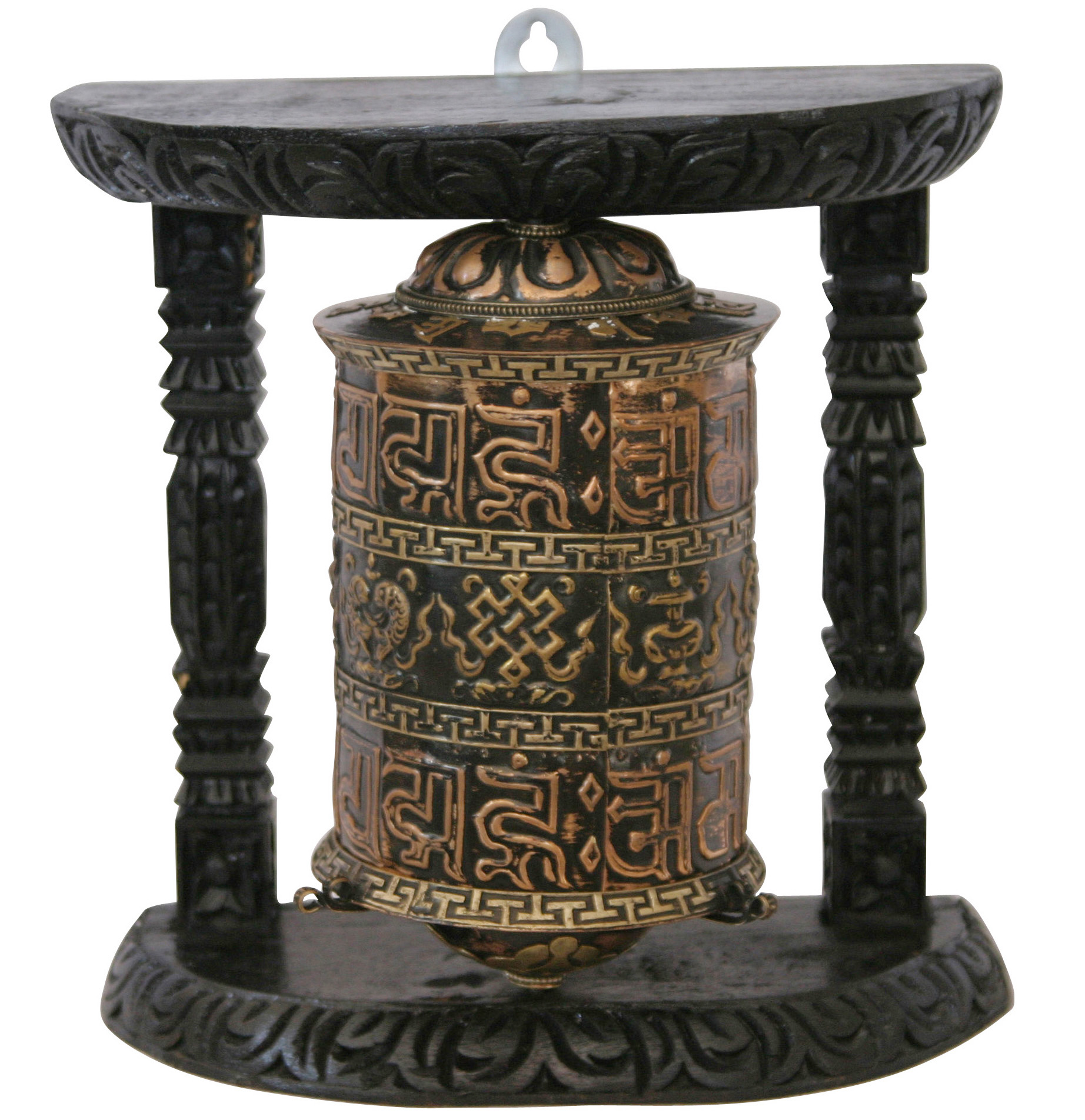
Endless knot on Nepalese temple prayer wheel

Karma symbols such as the endless knot (above) are common cultural motifs in Asia. Endless knots symbolize interlinking of cause and effect, a karmic cycle that continues eternally. The endless knot is visible in the center of the prayer wheel.

Karma (/ˈkɑːrmə/, from Sanskrit: कर्म, IPA: [ˈkɐɾmɐ]; Pali: kamma) is an ancient Indian concept that refers to an action, work, or deed, and its effect or consequences. In Indian religions, the term more specifically refers to a principle of cause and effect, often descriptively called the principle of karma, wherein individuals' intent and actions (cause) influence their future (effect): Good intent and good deeds contribute to good karma and happier rebirths, while bad intent and bad deeds contribute to bad karma and worse rebirths. In some scriptures, however, there is no link between rebirth and karma.

In Hinduism, karma is traditionally classified into four types: Sanchita karma (accumulated karma from past actions across lifetimes), Prārabdha karma (a portion of Sanchita karma that is currently bearing fruit and determines the circumstances of the present life), Āgāmi karma (future karma generated by present actions), and Kriyamāṇa karma (immediate karma created by current actions, which may yield results in the present or future).

Karma is often misunderstood as fate, destiny, or predetermination. Fate, destiny or predetermination have specific terminology in Sanskrit and are called Prarabdha.

The concept of karma is closely associated with the idea of rebirth in many schools of Indian religions (particularly in Hinduism, Buddhism, Jainism, and Sikhism), as well as Taoism. In these schools, karma in the present affects one's future in the current life as well as the nature and quality of future lives—one's saṃsāra.

Many New Agers believe in karma, treating it as a law of cause and effect that assures cosmic balance, although in some cases they stress that it is not a system that enforces punishment for past actions.

== Definition ==
The term karma (Sanskrit: कर्म; Pali: kamma) refers to both the executed 'deed, work, action, act' and the 'object, intent'.

Wilhelm Halbfass (2000) explains karma (karman) by contrasting it with the Sanskrit word kriya: whereas kriya is the activity along with the steps and effort in action, karma is (1) the executed action as a consequence of that activity, as well as (2) the intention of the actor behind an executed action or a planned action (described by some scholars as metaphysical residue left in the actor). A good action creates good karma, as does good intent. A bad action creates bad karma, as does bad intent.

Difficulty in arriving at a definition of karma arises because of the diversity of views among the schools of Hinduism; some, for example, consider karma and rebirth linked and simultaneously essential, some consider karma but not rebirth to be essential, and a few discuss and conclude karma and rebirth to be flawed fiction. Buddhism and Jainism have their own karma precepts. Thus, karma has not one, but multiple definitions and different meanings. It is a concept whose meaning, importance, and scope varies between the various traditions that originated in India, and various schools in each of these traditions. According to Manu Doshi, all Aryan philosophies accept karma but Jainism has gone deeper into this subject. Wendy O'Flaherty claims that, furthermore, there is an ongoing debate regarding whether karma is a theory, a model, a paradigm, a metaphor, or a metaphysical stance.

=== Principle of karma ===
Karma also refers to a conceptual principle that originated in India, often descriptively called the principle of karma, and sometimes the karma-theory or the law of karma.

In the context of theory, karma is complex and difficult to define. Different schools of Indology derive different definitions for the concept from ancient Indian texts; their definition is some combination of (1) causality that may be ethical or non-ethical; (2) ethicization, i.e., good or bad actions have consequences; and (3) rebirth. Other Indologists include in the definition that which explains the present circumstances of an individual with reference to their actions in the past. These actions may be those in a person's current life, or, in some schools of Indian traditions, possibly actions from their past lives; furthermore, the consequences may result in the current life, or a person's future lives. The law of karma operates independent of any deity or any process of divine judgment.

==== Causality ====
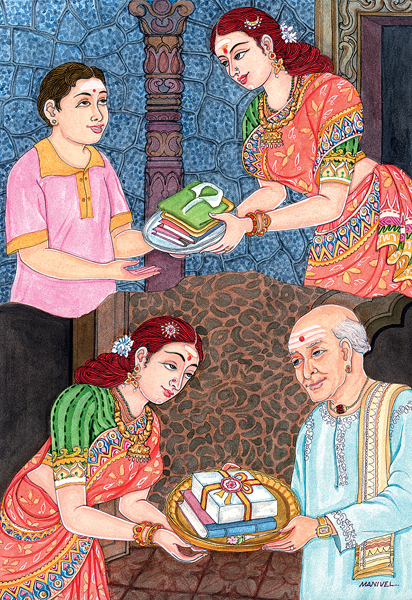
Karma as action and reaction: if we show goodness, we will reap goodness

A common theme to theories of karma is its principle of causality. This relationship between karma and causality is a central motif in all schools of Hindu, Buddhist, and Jain thought. One of the earliest associations of karma to causality occurs in the Brihadaranyaka Upanishad verses 4.4.5–6:

Now as a man is like this or like that,
according as he acts and according as he behaves, so will he be;
a man of good acts will become good, a man of bad acts, bad;
he becomes pure by pure deeds, bad by bad deeds;

And here they say that a person consists of desires,
and as is his desire, so is his will;
and as is his will, so is his deed;
and whatever deed he does, that he will reap.

— Brihadaranyaka Upanishad, (Note: The words "deed", "acts" above are rendered from karma.)

The theory of karma as causation holds that: (1) executed actions of an individual affect the individual and the life that person lives, and (2) the intentions of an individual affect the individual and the life that person lives. Disinterested actions, or unintentional actions do not have the same positive or negative karmic effect, as interested and intentional actions. In Buddhism, for example, actions that are performed, or arise, or originate without any bad intent, such as covetousness, are considered non-existent in karmic impact or neutral in influence to the individual.

Another causality characteristic, shared by many karmic theories, is that like deeds lead to like effects. Thus, good karma produces good effect on the actor, while bad karma produces bad effect. This effect may be material, moral, or emotional – that is, one's karma affects both one's happiness and unhappiness. The effect of karma need not be immediate; the effect of karma can be later in one's current life, and in some schools it extends to future lives.

The consequence or effects of one's karma can be described in two forms: phala and samskara. A phala (lit. 'fruit' or 'result') is the visible or invisible effect that is typically immediate or within the current life. In contrast, a samskara (Sanskrit: संस्कार) is an invisible effect, produced inside the actor because of the karma, transforming the agent and affecting their ability to be happy or unhappy in their current and future lives. The theory of karma is often presented in the context of samskaras.

Karl Potter and Harold Coward suggest that karmic principle can also be understood as a principle of psychology and habit. (Note: Karl Potter's suggestion is supported by the Bhagavad-Gita, which links good bondage and bad bondage to good habits and bad habits respectively. It also lists various types of habits – such as good (sattva), passion (rajas) and indifferent (tamas) – while explaining karma. In Yoga Sutras, the role of karma to creating habits is explained with Vāsanās.) Karma seeds habits (vāsanā), and habits create the nature of a person. Karma also seeds self perception, and perception influences how one experiences life-events. Both habits and self perception affect the course of one's life. Breaking bad habits is not easy: it requires conscious karmic effort. Thus, psyche and habit, according to Potter and Coward, link karma to causality in ancient Indian literature. The idea of karma may be compared to the notion of a person's 'character', as both are an assessment of the person and determined by that person's habitual thinking and acting. Christopher Chapple describes action as leaving an internal residue, or samskara, within the person, and these residues, also called vāsanās, develop into habit patterns that shape "how one perceives and reacts to the world".

==== Ethicization ====
The second theme common to karma theories is ethicization. This begins with the premise that every action has a consequence, which will come to fruition in either this life or a future life; thus, morally good acts will have positive consequences, whereas bad acts will produce negative results. An individual's present situation is thereby explained by reference to actions in their present or in previous lifetimes. Karma is not itself "reward and punishment", but the law that produces consequence. Wilhelm Halbfass notes that good karma is considered as dharma and leads to punya ('merit'), while bad karma is considered adharma and leads to pāp ('demerit, sin').

Reichenbach (1988) suggests that the theories of karma are an ethical theory. This is so because the ancient scholars of India linked intent and actual action to the merit, reward, demerit, and punishment. A theory without ethical premise would be a pure causal relation; the merit or reward or demerit or punishment would be the same regardless of the actor's intention. In ethics, one's intentions, attitudes, and desires matter in the evaluation of one's action. Where the outcome is unintended, the moral responsibility for it is less on the actor, even though causal responsibility may be the same regardless. A karma theory considers not only the action, but also the actor's intentions, attitudes, and desires before and during the action. The karma concept thus encourages each person to seek and live a moral life, as well as avoid an immoral life. The meaning and significance of karma is thus as a building-block of an ethical theory.

==== Rebirth ====
The third common theme of karma theories is the concept of reincarnation or the cycle of rebirths (saṃsāra). Rebirth is a fundamental concept of Hinduism, Buddhism, Jainism, and Sikhism. Rebirth, or saṃsāra, is the concept that all life forms go through a cycle of reincarnation, that is, a series of births and rebirths. The rebirths and consequent life may be in different realm, condition, or form. The karma theories suggest that the realm, condition, and form depend on the quality and quantity of karma. In schools that believe in rebirth, every living being's soul transmigrates (recycles) after death, carrying the seeds of karmic impulses from life just completed, into another life and lifetime of karmas. This cycle continues indefinitely, except for those who consciously break this cycle by reaching moksha. Those who break the cycle reach the realm of gods, those who do not continue in the cycle.

The concept has been intensely debated in ancient literature of India; with different schools of Indian religions considering the relevance of rebirth as either essential, or secondary, or unnecessary fiction. Hiriyanna (1949) suggests rebirth to be a necessary corollary of karma; Yamunacharya (1966) asserts that karma is a fact, while reincarnation is a hypothesis; and Creel (1986) suggests that karma is a basic concept, rebirth is a derivative concept.

The theory of "karma and rebirth" raises numerous questions – such as how, when, and why the cycle started in the first place, what is the relative karmic merit of one action versus another and why, and what evidence is there that rebirth actually happens, among others. Various schools of Hinduism recognized these difficulties and debated their own formulations. Some developed what they considered internally consistent theories, while other schools modified and de-emphasized it; a few schools in Hinduism such as Charvakas (or Lokayata) abandoned the theory of "karma and rebirth" altogether. Many schools of Buddhism consider karma-rebirth cycle integral to their theories of soteriology.

== Early development ==
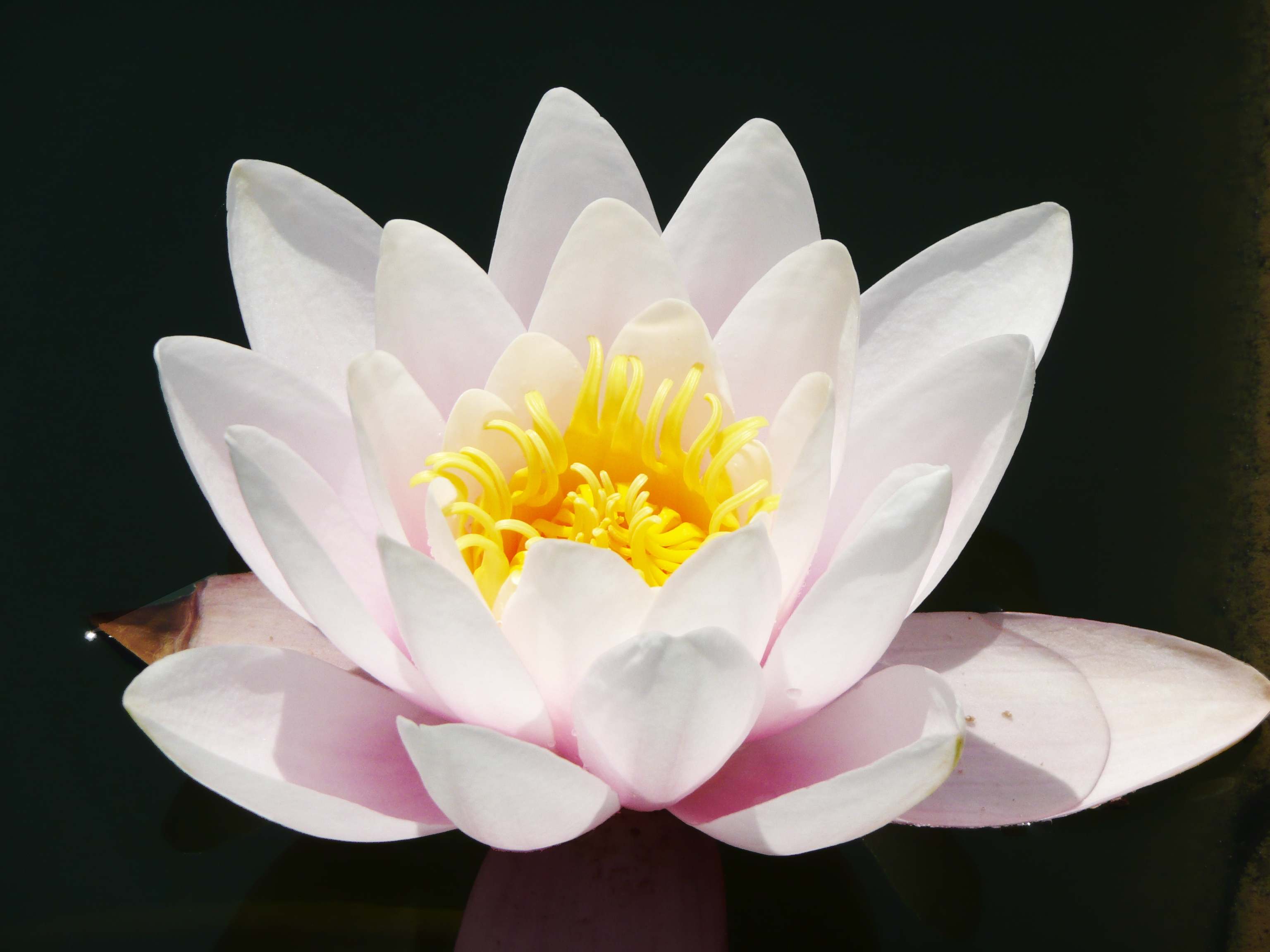
Lotus symbolically represents karma in many Asian traditions. A blooming lotus flower is one of the few flowers that simultaneously carries seeds inside itself while it blooms. Seed is symbolically seen as cause, the flower effect. Lotus is also considered as a reminder that one can grow, share good karma and remain unstained even in muddy circumstances

The Vedic Sanskrit word kárman- (nominative kárma) means 'work' or 'deed', often used in the context of Srauta rituals. In the Rigveda, the word occurs some 40 times. In Satapatha Brahmana 1.7.1.5, sacrifice is declared as the "greatest" of works; Satapatha Brahmana 10.1.4.1 associates the potential of becoming immortal (amara) with the karma of the agnicayana sacrifice.

The Vedic words for "action" and "merit" in pre-Upaniṣadic texts carry moral significance and are not solely linked to ritual practices. The word karman simply means "action," which can be either positive or negative, and is not always associated with religious ceremonies; its predominant association with ritual in the Brāhmaṇa texts is likely a reflection of their ritualistic nature. In the same vein, sukṛta (and subsequently, puṇya) denotes any form of "merit", whether it be ethical or ritualistic. In contrast, terms such as pāpa and duṣkṛta consistently represent morally wrong actions.

One of the earliest clear discussion of the karma doctrine is in the Upanishads. The doctrine occurs here in the context of a discussion of the fate of the individual after death. For example, causality and ethicization is stated in Bṛhadāraṇyaka Upaniṣad 3.2.13:

Truly, one becomes good through good deeds, and evil through evil deeds.

Some authors state that the samsara (transmigration) and karma doctrine may be non-Vedic, and the ideas may have developed in the "shramana" traditions that preceded Buddhism and Jainism. Others state that some of the complex ideas of the ancient emerging theory of karma flowed from Vedic thinkers to Buddhist and Jain thinkers. The mutual influences between the traditions are unclear. Wendy O'Flaherty describes the development of karma theory as a composite structure, shaped by interaction among several religious and cultural strands.

Many philosophical debates surrounding the concept are shared by the Hindu, Jain, and Buddhist traditions, and the early developments in each tradition incorporated different novel ideas. For example, Buddhists allowed karma transfer from one person to another and sraddha rites, but had difficulty defending the rationale. In contrast, Hindu schools and Jainism would not allow the possibility of karma transfer.

== In Hinduism ==
The concept of karma in Hinduism developed and evolved over centuries. The earliest Upanishads began with the questions about how and why man is born, and what happens after death. As answers to the latter, the early theories in these ancient Sanskrit documents include pancagni vidya (the five fire doctrine), pitryana (the cyclic path of fathers), and devayana (the cycle-transcending, path of the gods). Those who perform superficial rituals and seek material gain, claimed these ancient scholars, travel the way of their fathers and recycle back into another life; those who renounce these, go into the forest and pursue spiritual knowledge, were claimed to climb into the higher path of the gods. It is these who break the cycle and are not reborn. With the composition of the Epics – the common man's introduction to dharma in Hinduism – the ideas of causality and essential elements of the theory of karma were being recited in folk stories. For example:

As a man himself sows, so he himself reaps; no man inherits the good or evil act of another man. The fruit is of the same quality as the action.

— Mahabharata, xii.291.22

The 6th chapter of the Anushasana Parva (the Teaching Book), the 13th book of the Mahabharata, opens with Yudhishthira asking Bhishma: "Is the course of a person's life already destined, or can human effort shape one's life?" The future, replies Bhishma, is both a function of current human effort derived from free will and past human actions that set the circumstances. Over and over again, the chapters of Mahabharata recite the key postulates of karma theory. That is: intent and action (karma) has consequences; karma lingers and doesn't disappear; and, all positive or negative experiences in life require effort and intent. For example:

Happiness comes due to good actions, suffering results from evil actions,
by actions, all things are obtained, by inaction, nothing whatsoever is enjoyed.
If one's action bore no fruit, then everything would be of no avail,
if the world worked from fate alone, it would be neutralized.

— Mahabharata, xiii.6.10 & 19 (Note: There is extensive debate in the Epic Mahabharata about karma, free will and destiny across different chapters and books. Different characters in the Epic take sides, some claiming destiny is supreme, some claiming free will is.)

Over time, various schools of Hinduism developed many different definitions of karma, some making karma appear quite deterministic, while others make room for free will and moral agency. Among the six most studied schools of Hinduism, the theory of karma evolved in different ways, as their respective scholars reasoned and attempted to address the internal inconsistencies, implications and issues of the karma doctrine. According to Professor Wilhelm Halbfass,

- The Nyaya school of Hinduism considers karma and rebirth as central, with some Nyaya scholars such as Udayana suggesting that the Karma doctrine implies that God exists.
- The Vaisesika school does not consider the karma from past lives doctrine very important.
- The Samkhya school considers karma to be of secondary importance (second to prakrti).
- The Mimamsa school gives a negligible role to karma from past lives, disregards samsara and moksa.
- The Yoga school considers karma from past lives to be secondary, one's behavior and psychology in the current life is what has consequences and leads to entanglements.
- The Vedanta schools (including Advaita) accept the doctrine of karma, and they hold that it does not function on its own power, instead they think that God (Isvara) is the dispenser of the fruit (phala) of karma. This idea is defended in the Brahmasutras (3.2.38). Kala (time) is taken as a factor alongside karma in determining one's experiences.

The above schools illustrate the diversity of views, but are not exhaustive. Each school has sub-schools in Hinduism, such as that of non-dualism and dualism under Vedanta. Furthermore, there are other schools of Indian philosophy, such as Charvaka (or Lokayata; the materialists), that denied the theory of karma-rebirth, as well as the existence of God; to this non-Vedic school, the properties of things come from the nature of things. Causality emerges from the interaction, actions, and nature of things and people, making determinative principles such as karma or God unnecessary.

== In Buddhism ==
Karma and karmaphala are fundamental concepts in Buddhism, which explain how our intentional actions keep us tied to rebirth in samsara, whereas the Buddhist path, as exemplified in the Noble Eightfold Path, shows us the way out of samsara.

The cycle of rebirth is determined by karma, literally 'action'. (Note: In early Buddhism rebirth is ascribed to craving or ignorance, and the theory of karma may have been of minor importance in early Buddhist soteriology.) Karmaphala (wherein phala means 'fruit, result') refers to the 'effect' or 'result' of karma. The similar term karmavipaka (wherein vipāka means 'ripening') refers to the 'maturation, ripening' of karma.

In the Buddhist tradition, karma refers to actions driven by intention (cetanā), (Note: Rupert Gethin: "[Karma is] a being's intentional 'actions' of body, speech, and mind—whatever is done, said, or even just thought with definite intention or volition"; "[a]t root karma or 'action' is considered a mental act or intention; it is an aspect of our mental life: 'It is "intention" that I call karma; having formed the intention, one performs acts (karma) by body, speech and mind.'") a deed done deliberately through body, speech or mind, which leads to future consequences. The Nibbedhika Sutta, Anguttara Nikaya 6.63:

Intention (cetana) I tell you, is kamma. Intending, one does kamma by way of body, speech, & intellect. (Note: There are many different translation of the above quote into English. For example, Peter Harvey translates the quote as follows: "It is will (cetana), O monks, that I call karma; having willed, one acts through body, speech, and mind." (A.III.415).)

How these intentional actions lead to rebirth, and how the idea of rebirth is to be reconciled with the doctrines of impermanence and no-self, (Note: Dargray: "When [the Buddhist] understanding of karma is correlated to the Buddhist doctrine of universal impermanence and No-Self, a serious problem arises as to where this trace is stored and what the trace left is. The problem is aggravated when the trace remains latent over a long period, perhaps over a period of many existences. The crucial problem presented to all schools of Buddhist philosophy was where the trace is stored and how it can remain in the ever-changing stream of phenomena which build up the individual and what the nature of this trace is.") is a matter of philosophical inquiry in the Buddhist traditions, for which several solutions have been proposed. In early Buddhism, no explicit theory of rebirth and karma is worked out, and "the karma doctrine may have been incidental to early Buddhist soteriology." In early Buddhism, rebirth is ascribed to craving or ignorance. Unlike that of Jains, Buddha's teaching of karma is not strictly deterministic, but incorporated circumstantial factors such as other Niyamas. (Note: Thanissaro Bhikkhu: "Unlike the theory of linear causality — which led the Vedists and Jains to see the relationship between an act and its result as predictable and tit-for-tat — the principle of this/that conditionality makes that relationship inherently complex. The results of kamma ("kamma" is the Pali spelling for the word "karma") experienced at any one point in time come not only from past kamma, but also from present kamma. This means that, although there are general patterns relating habitual acts to corresponding results [MN 135], there is no set one-for-one, tit-for-tat, relationship between a particular action and its results. Instead, the results are determined by the context of the act, both in terms of actions that preceded or followed it [MN 136] and in terms one's state of mind at the time of acting or experiencing the result [AN 3:99]. [...] The feedback loops inherent in this/that conditionality mean that the working out of any particular cause-effect relationship can be very complex indeed. This explains why the Buddha says in AN 4:77 that the results of kamma are imponderable. Only a person who has developed the mental range of a Buddha—another imponderable itself—would be able to trace the intricacies of the kammic network. The basic premise of kamma is simple—that skillful intentions lead to favorable results, and unskillful ones to unfavorable results—but the process by which those results work themselves out is so intricate that it cannot be fully mapped. We can compare this with the Mandelbrot set, a mathematical set generated by a simple equation, but whose graph is so complex that it will probably never be completely explored.") It is not a rigid and mechanical process, but a flexible, fluid and dynamic process. There is no set linear relationship between a particular action and its results. In the Sarvastivada tradition, immediate repentance may affect karmic consequences by making an act incomplete. The karmic effect of a deed is not determined solely by the deed itself, but also by the nature of the person who commits the deed, and by the circumstances in which it is committed. Karmaphala is not a "judgement" enforced by a God, Deity or other supernatural being that controls the affairs of the Cosmos. Rather, karmaphala is the outcome of a natural process of cause and effect. (Note: Khandro Rinpoche: "Buddhism is a nontheistic philosophy. We do not believe in a creator but in the causes and conditions that create certain circumstances that then come to fruition. This is called karma. It has nothing to do with judgement; there is no one keeping track of our karma and sending us up above or down below. Karma is simply the wholeness of a cause, or first action, and its effect, or fruition, which then becomes another cause. In fact, one karmic cause can have many fruitions, all of which can cause thousands more creations. Just as a handful of seed can ripen into a full field of grain, a small amount of karma can generate limitless effects.") Within Buddhism, the real importance of the doctrine of karma and its fruits lies in the recognition of the urgency to put a stop to the whole process. The Acintita Sutta warns that "the results of karma" is one of the four incomprehensible subjects (or acinteyya), subjects that are beyond all conceptualization, and cannot be understood with logical thought or reason. (Note: Dasgupta explains that in Indian philosophy, acintya is "that which is to be unavoidably accepted for explaining facts, but which cannot stand the scrutiny of logic." See also the Aggi-Vacchagotta Sutta "Discourse to Vatsagotra on the [Simile of] Fire," Majjhima Nikaya 72, in which the Buddha is questioned by Vatsagotra on the "ten indeterminate question," and the Buddha explains that a Tathagata is like a fire that has been extinguished, and is "deep, boundless, hard to fathom, like the sea".)

Nichiren Buddhism teaches that transformation and change through faith and practice changes adverse karma—negative causes made in the past that result in negative results in the present and future—to positive causes for benefits in the future.

== In Jainism ==
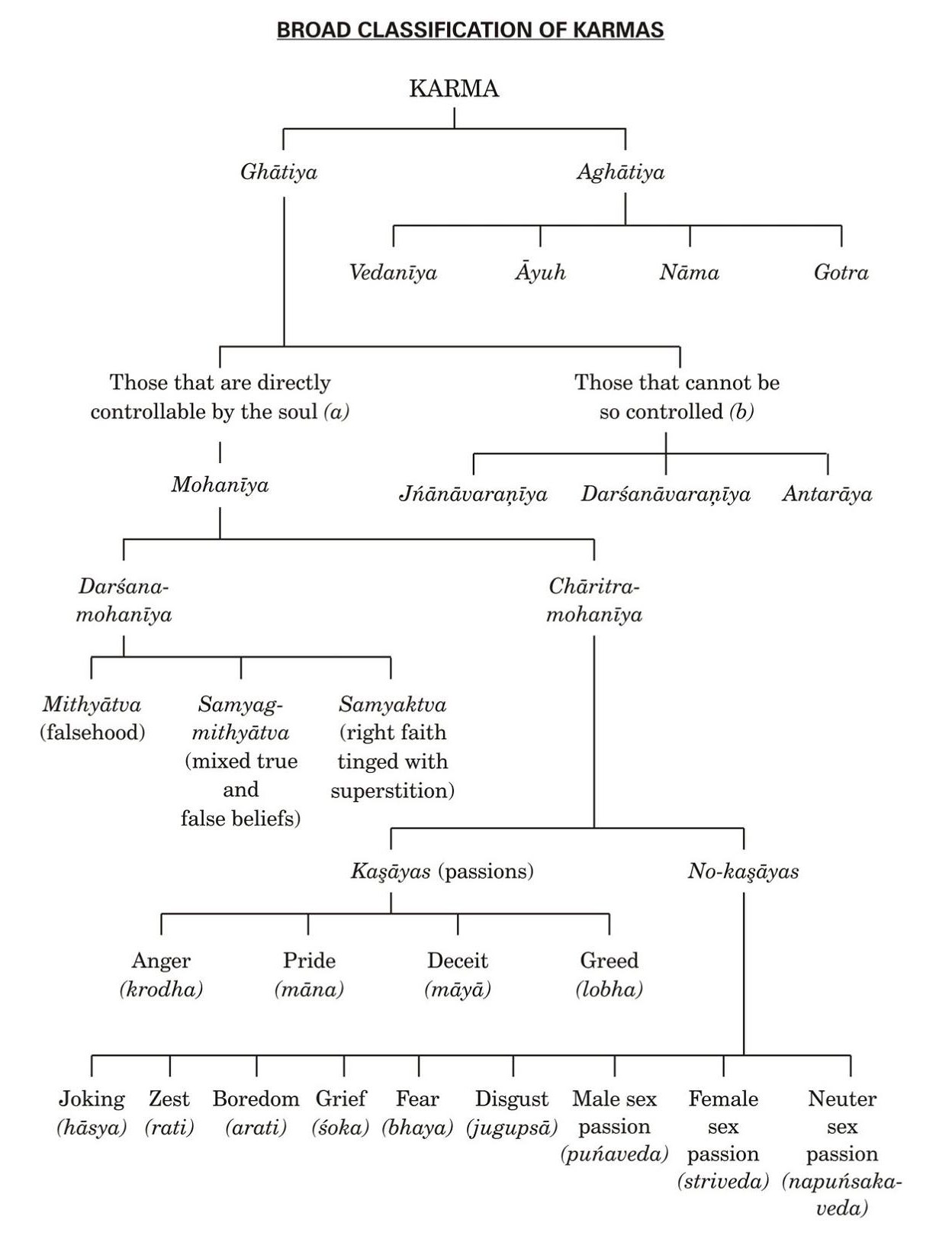
Types of Karmas as per Jain philosophy

In Jainism, karma conveys a totally different meaning from that commonly understood in Hindu philosophy and western civilization. Jain philosophy is one of the oldest Indian philosophy that completely separates body (matter) from the soul (pure consciousness). In Jainism, karma is referred to as karmic dirt, as it consists of very subtle particles of matter that pervade the entire universe. Karmas are attracted to the karmic field of a soul due to vibrations created by activities of mind, speech, and body as well as various mental dispositions. Hence the karmas are the subtle matter surrounding the consciousness of a soul. When these two components (consciousness and karma) interact, we experience the life we know at present. Jain texts expound that seven tattvas (truths or fundamentals) constitute reality. These are:

1. Jīva: the soul which is characterized by consciousness
2. Ajīva: the non-soul
3. Āsrava: inflow of auspicious and evil karmic matter into the soul.
4. Bandha (bondage): mutual intermingling of the soul and karmas.
5. Samvara (stoppage): obstruction of the inflow of karmic matter into the soul.
6. Nirjara (gradual dissociation): separation or falling off of part of karmic matter from the soul.
7. Mokṣha (liberation): complete annihilation of all karmic matter (bound with any particular soul).

According to Padmanabh Jaini,

This emphasis on reaping the fruits only of one's own karma was not restricted to the Jainas; both Hindus and Buddhist writers have produced doctrinal materials stressing the same point. Each of the latter traditions, however, developed practices in basic contradiction to such belief. In addition to shrardha (the ritual Hindu offerings by the son of deceased), we find among Hindus widespread adherence to the notion of divine intervention in ones fate, while Buddhists eventually came to propound such theories like boon-granting bodhisattvas, transfer of merit and like. Only the Jainas have been absolutely unwilling to allow such ideas to penetrate their community, despite the fact that there must have been tremendous amount of social pressure on them to do so.

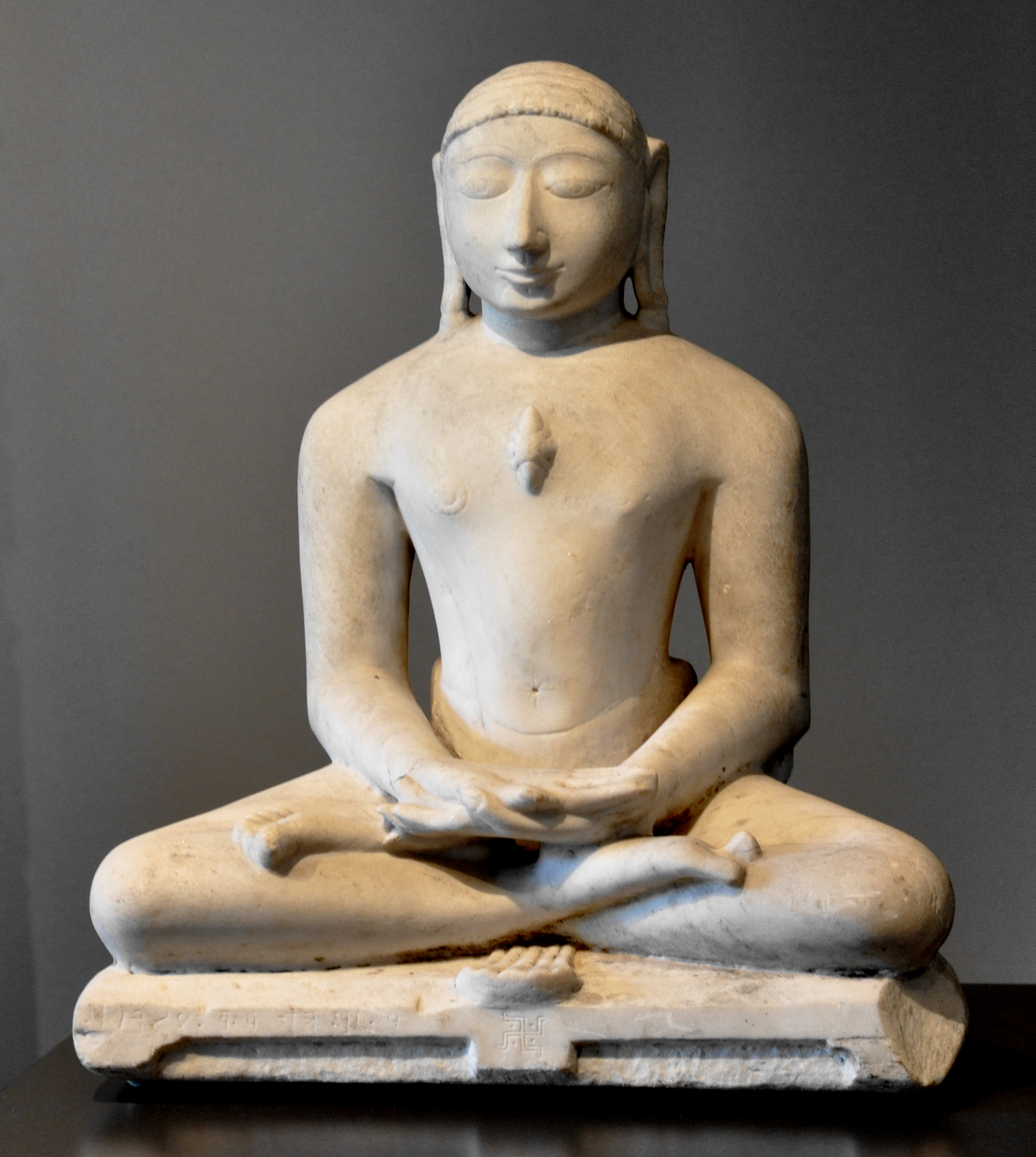
Shrivatsa or the karmic knot depicted on the chest of the Tirthankara

The relationship between the soul and karma, states Padmanabh Jaini, can be explained with the analogy of gold. Like gold is always found mixed with impurities in its original state, Jainism holds that the soul is not pure at its origin but is always impure and defiled like natural gold. One can exert effort and purify gold, similarly, Jainism states that the defiled soul can be purified by proper refining methodology. Karma either defiles the soul further, or refines it to a cleaner state, and this affects future rebirths. Karma is thus an efficient cause (nimitta) in Jain philosophy, but not the material cause (upadana). The soul is believed to be the material cause.

The key points where the theory of karma in Jainism can be stated as follows:

- Karma operates as a self-sustaining mechanism as natural universal law, without any need of an external entity to manage them. (absence of the exogenous 'Divine entity' in Jainism)
- Jainism advocates that a soul attracts karmic matter even with the thoughts, and not just the actions. Thus, to even think evil of someone would endure a karma-bandha or an increment in bad karma. For this reason, Jainism emphasise on developing Ratnatraya (The Three Jewels): samyaka darśana ('Right Faith'), samyaka jnāna ('Right Knowledge') and samyaka charitra ('Right Conduct').
- In Jain theology, a soul is released from worldly affairs as soon as it is able to emancipate from the karma-bandha. In Jainism, nirvana and moksha are used interchangeably. Nirvana represents annihilation of all karmas by an individual soul and moksha represents the perfect blissful state (free from all bondage). In the presence of a Tirthankara, a soul can attain Kevala Jnana ('omniscience') and subsequently nirvana, without any need of intervention by the Tirthankara.
- The karmic theory in Jainism operates endogenously. Even the Tirthankaras themselves have to go through the stages of emancipation, for attaining that state.
- Jainism treats all souls equally, inasmuch as it advocates that all souls have the same potential of attaining nirvana. Only those who make effort really attain it, but nonetheless, each soul is capable on its own to do so by gradually reducing its karma.

=== Eight Karmas ===
There are eight types of Karma which attach a soul to Samsara (the cycle of birth and death):

1. Jnanavarniya (knowledge-obstructing): like a veil prevents a face and its features from being seen, this karma prevents the soul from knowing an object along with details about that object. This karma obstructs the soul from realizing its essential quality of knowledge. In its absence, a soul is omniscient. There are five sub-types of jnanavarniya karma which prevents the five types of knowledge: mati jnana (sensory knowledge), shruta jnana (articulate knowledge), avadhi jnana (clairvoyance), mana paryaya jnana (telepathy) and kevala jnana (omniscience).
2. Darshanavarniya (perception-obstructing): like a gatekeeper prevents the sight of the king, this karma prevents an object from being perceived, hiding it. This karma obstructs the soul from realizing its essential quality of perception. In its absence, a soul completely perceives all substances in the universe. There are nine sub-types of this karma. Four of these prevent the four types of perception; visual perception, non-visual perception, clairvoyant perception and omniscient perception. The other five sub-types of darshanavarniya karma bondage induce five kinds of sleep causing reduction in consciousness: light sleep, deep sleep, drowsiness, heavy drowsiness, and sleep-walking.
3. Vedaniya (sensation-producing): like licking honey from a sword gives a sweet taste but cuts the tongue, this karma makes a soul experience pleasure and pain. The soul's bliss is continuously disturbed by experiences of external sensual pleasure and pain. In the absence of the vedaniya karma, the soul experiences undisturbed bliss. There are two sub-types of this karma; pleasure-producing and pain-producing.
4. Mohniya (deluding): regarded as the King of all Karmas, it is like a bee becoming infatuated with the smell of a flower and is attracted to it, this karma attracts the soul to the objects that it considers favorable while repelling it from objects it considers unfavorable. It creates a delusion in the soul that external objects can affect it, and induces the false perception of I'm body within the soul. This karma obstructs the soul's essential quality of happiness and prevents the soul from finding pure happiness in itself.
5. Ayu (lifespan-determining): like a prisoner remains trapped by iron chains (around his legs, hands, etc.) this karma keeps a soul trapped in a particular life (or birth).
6. Nama (body-producing): like a painter creates various pictures and gives them various names, this karma gives souls various types of bodies (that are classified based on various attributes). It is the namakarma which determines the body of living organism into which the soul must enter.
7. Gotra (status-determining): like a potter makes short and tall pots, this karma bestows a low or high (societal) status on the body of soul. It creates social inequalities and in its absence, all souls are equal. There are two sub-types of gotra karma: high status and low status.
8. Antaraya (power-obstructing): like a treasurer obstructs a king from spending his wealth, this karma prevents the soul from using its innate power for acts of charity, profit, enjoyment, repeated enjoyment and will-power. It obstructs and prevents the soul's essential quality of infinite power from manifesting. In its absence, a soul has infinite power.

== Reception in other traditions ==
=== Sikhism ===
In Sikhism, all living beings are described as being under the influence of the three qualities of maya. Always present together in varying mix and degrees, these three qualities of maya bind the soul to the body and to the earth plane. Above these three qualities is the eternal time. Due to the influence of three modes of maya's nature, jivas (individual beings) perform activities under the control and purview of the eternal time. These activities are called karma, wherein the underlying principle is that karma is the law that brings back the results of actions to the person performing them.

This life is likened to a field in which our karma is the seed. We harvest exactly what we sow; no less, no more. This infallible law of karma holds everyone responsible for what the person is or is going to be. Based on the total sum of past karma, some feel close to the Pure Being in this life and others feel separated. This is the law of karma in Gurbani (Sri Guru Granth Sahib). Like other Indian and oriental schools of thought, the Gurbani also accepts the doctrines of karma and reincarnation as the facts of nature.

=== Falun Gong ===
David Ownby asserts that Falun Gong differs from Buddhism in its definition of the term "karma". Falun Gong treats karma not as a process of award and punishment, but as an exclusively negative term. The Chinese term de, or 'virtue', is reserved for what might otherwise be termed 'good karma' in Buddhism. Karma is understood as the source of all suffering – what Buddhism might refer to as 'bad karma'. According to Li Hongzhi, the founder of Falun Gong: "A person has done bad things over his many lifetimes, and for people this results in misfortune, or for cultivators, its karmic obstacles, so there's birth, aging, sickness, and death. This is ordinary karma."

Falun Gong teaches that the spirit is locked in the cycle of rebirth, also known as samsara, due to the accumulation of karma. Li describes karma as a black substance that accumulates in other dimensions, lifetime after lifetime, through bad deeds and bad thoughts, causing suffering, blocking people from the truth of the universe and from attaining enlightenment, and perpetuating rebirth. Li says that due to the accumulation of karma, the human spirit upon death will reincarnate over and over again, until the karma is paid off or eliminated through cultivation, or the person is destroyed due to the bad deeds he has done.

Ownby regards the concept of karma as a cornerstone of individual moral behaviour in Falun Gong, and also readily traceable to the Christian doctrine of "one reaps what one sows". Ownby says Falun Gong is differentiated by a "system of transmigration", although, "in which each organism is the reincarnation of a previous life form, its current form having been determined by karmic calculation of the moral qualities of the previous lives lived." Ownby says the seeming unfairness of manifest inequities can then be explained, while still allowing for moral behaviour in spite of them.

According to Li,

Human beings all fell here from the many dimensions of the universe. They no longer met the requirements of the Fa at their given levels in the universe, and thus had to drop down. Just as we have said before, the heavier one's mortal attachments, the further down one drops, with the descent continuing until one arrives at the state of ordinary human beings.

He says that, in the eyes of higher beings, the purpose of human life is not merely to be human, but to awaken quickly on Earth, a "setting of delusion," and return. "That is what they really have in mind; they are opening a door for you. Those who fail to return will have no choice but to reincarnate, with this continuing until they amass a huge amount of karma and are destroyed."

Ownby regards this as the basis for Falun Gong's apparent "opposition to practitioners' taking medicine when ill; they are missing an opportunity to work off karma by allowing an illness to run its course (suffering depletes karma) or to fight the illness through cultivation." Benjamin Penny shares this interpretation. Since Li believes that "karma is the primary factor that causes sickness in people," Penny asks: "if disease comes from karma and karma can be eradicated through cultivation of xinxing, then what good will medicine do?" Li himself states that he is not forbidding practitioners from taking medicine, maintaining that "What I'm doing is telling people the relationship between practicing cultivation and medicine-taking." Li also states that "An everyday person needs to take medicine when he gets sick." Danny Schechter (2001) quotes a Falun Gong student who says "It is always an individual choice whether one should take medicine or not."

=== Taoism ===
Karma is an important concept in Taoism. Every deed is tracked by deities and spirits. Appropriate rewards or retribution follow karma, just like a shadow follows a person.

The karma doctrine of Taoism developed in three stages. In the first stage, causality between actions and consequences was adopted, with supernatural beings keeping track of everyone's karma and assigning fate (ming). In the second phase, transferability of karma ideas from Chinese Buddhism were expanded, and a transfer or inheritance of Karmic fate from ancestors to one's current life was introduced. In the third stage of karma doctrine development, ideas of rebirth based on karma were added. One could be reborn either as another human being or another animal, according to this belief. In the third stage, additional ideas were introduced; for example, rituals, repentance and offerings at Taoist temples were encouraged as it could alleviate Karmic burden.

=== Shinto ===
Interpreted as musubi (産霊), a view of karma is recognized in Shinto as a means of enriching, empowering, and affirming life. Musubi has fundamental significance in Shinto, because creative development forms the basis of the Shinto worldview.

Many deities are connected to musubi and have it in their names.

== Discussion ==
=== Free will and destiny ===
One of the significant controversies with the karma doctrine is whether it always implies destiny, and its implications on free will. This controversy is also referred to as the moral agency problem; it is not unique to karma doctrine, but is also found in some form in monotheistic religions. Christopher Chapple notes that the term karma means action, not fate or destiny, and "carries no negative connotations and does not imply any particular cosmological view."

The free will controversy can be outlined in three parts:

1. A person who kills, rapes or commits any other unjust act, can claim all his bad actions were a product of his karma: he is devoid of free will, he can not make a choice, he is an agent of karma, and he merely delivers necessary punishments his "wicked" victims deserved for their own karma in past lives. Are crimes and unjust actions due to free will, or because of forces of karma?
2. Does a person who suffers from the unnatural death of a loved one, or rape or any other unjust act, assume a moral agent is responsible, that the harm is gratuitous, and therefore seek justice? Or, should one blame oneself for bad karma over past lives, and assume that the unjust suffering is fate?
3. Does the karma doctrine undermine the incentive for moral education—because all suffering is deserved and consequence of past lives, why learn anything when the balance sheet of karma from past lives will determine one's action and sufferings?

The explanations and replies to this problem vary among schools of Hinduism, Buddhism and Jainism. The schools of Hinduism, such as Yoga and Advaita Vedanta, that have emphasized present life over the dynamics of karma residue moving across past lives, allow for free will. Their argument, as well of other schools, is threefold:

1. The theory of karma includes both an action and the intention behind that action. Not only is one affected by past karma, but one also creates new karma whenever one acts with intent – good or bad. If intent and act can be proven beyond reasonable doubt, new karma can be proven, and the process of justice can proceed against this new karma. The actor who kills, rapes or commits any other unjust act, must be considered as the moral agent for this new karma, and tried.
2. Life forms not only receive and reap the consequence of their past karma, together they are the means to initiate, evaluate, judge, give and deliver consequence of karma to others.
3. Karma is a theory that explains some evils, not all (cf. moral evil versus natural evil).

Other schools of Hinduism, as well as Buddhism and Jainism that do consider cycle of rebirths central to their beliefs and that karma from past lives affects one's present, believe that both free will (cetanā) and karma can co-exist; however, their answers have not persuaded all scholars.

=== Psychological indeterminacy ===
Another issue with the theory of karma is that it is psychologically indeterminate, suggests Obeyesekere (1968). That is, if no one can know what their karma was in previous lives, and if the karma from past lives can determine one's future, then the individual is psychologically unclear what if anything he or she can do now to shape the future, be more happy, or reduce suffering. If something goes wrong, such as sickness or failure at work, the individual is unclear if karma from past lives was the cause, or the sickness was caused by curable infection and the failure was caused by something correctable.

This psychological indeterminacy problem is also not unique to the theory of karma; it is found in every religion adopting the premise that God has a plan, or in some way influences human events. As with the karma-and-free-will problem above, schools that insist on primacy of rebirths face the most controversy. Their answers to the psychological indeterminacy issue are the same as those for addressing the free will problem.

=== Transferability ===
Some schools of Indian religions, particularly within Buddhism, allow transfer of karma merit and demerit from one person to another. This transfer is an exchange of non-physical quality conceptualized in transactional terms, just like an exchange of physical goods between two human beings. The practice of karma transfer, or even its possibility, is controversial. Karma transfer raises questions similar to those with substitutionary atonement and vicarious punishment. It undermines the ethical foundations, and dissociates the causality and ethicization in the theory of karma from the moral agent. Proponents of some Buddhist schools suggest that the concept of karma merit transfer encourages religious giving and that such transfers are not a mechanism to transfer bad karma (i.e., demerit) from one person to another.

In Hinduism, Sraddha rites during funerals have been labelled as karma merit transfer ceremonies by a few scholars, a claim disputed by others. Other schools in Hinduism, such as the Yoga and Advaita Vedantic philosophies, and Jainism hold that karma can not be transferred.

=== The problem of evil ===
There has been an ongoing debate about karma theory and how it answers the problem of evil and related problem of theodicy. The problem of evil is a significant question debated in monotheistic religions with two beliefs:

1. There is one God who is absolutely good and compassionate (omnibenevolent); and
2. That one God knows absolutely everything (omniscient) and is all powerful (omnipotent).

The problem of evil is then stated in formulations such as, "why does the omnibenevolent, omniscient and omnipotent God allow any evil and suffering to exist in the world?" Sociologist Max Weber extended the problem of evil to Eastern traditions.

The problem of evil, in the context of karma, has been long discussed in Eastern traditions, both in theistic and non-theistic schools; for example, in Uttara Mīmāṃsā Sutras Book 2 Chapter 1; the 8th century arguments by Adi Sankara in Brahma Sutra bhasya where he posits that God cannot reasonably be the cause of the world because there exists moral evil, inequality, cruelty and suffering in the world; and the 11th century theodicy discussion by Ramanuja in Sri Bhasya. Epics such as the Mahabharata, for example, suggest three prevailing theories in ancient India as to why good and evil exist – one being that everything is ordained by God, another being karma, and a third citing chance events (yadrccha, यदृच्छा). The Mahabharata, which includes Hindu deity Vishnu in the avatar of Krishna as one of the central characters, debates the nature and existence of suffering from these three perspectives, and includes a theory of suffering as arising from an interplay of chance events (such as floods and other events of nature), circumstances created by past human actions, and the current desires, volitions, dharma, adharma and current actions (purusakara) of people. However, while karma theory in the Mahabharata presents alternative perspectives on the problem of evil and suffering, it offers no conclusive answer.

Other scholars suggest that nontheistic Indian religious traditions do not assume an omnibenevolent creator, and some theistic schools do not define or characterize their God(s) as monotheistic Western religions do and the deities have colorful, complex personalities; the Indian deities are personal and cosmic facilitators, and in some schools conceptualized like Plato's Demiurge. Therefore, the problem of theodicy in many schools of major Indian religions is not significant, or at least is of a different nature than in Western religions. Many Indian religions place greater emphasis on developing the karma principle for first cause and innate justice with Man as focus, rather than developing religious principles with the nature and powers of God and divine judgment as focus. Some scholars, particularly of the Nyaya school of Hinduism and Sankara in Brahma Sutra bhasya, have posited that karma doctrine implies existence of god, who administers and affects the person's environment given that person's karma, but then acknowledge that it makes karma as violable, contingent and unable to address the problem of evil. Arthur Herman states that karma-transmigration theory solves all three historical formulations to the problem of evil while acknowledging the theodicy insights of Sankara and Ramanuja.

Some theistic Indian religions, such as Sikhism, suggest evil and suffering are a human phenomenon and arises from the karma of individuals. In other theistic schools such as those in Hinduism, particularly its Nyaya school, karma is combined with dharma and evil is explained as arising from human actions and intent that is in conflict with dharma. In nontheistic religions such as Buddhism, Jainism and the Mimamsa school of Hinduism, karma theory is used to explain the cause of evil as well as to offer distinct ways to avoid or be unaffected by evil in the world.

Those schools of Hinduism, Buddhism, and Jainism that rely on karma-rebirth theory have been critiqued for their theological explanation of suffering in children by birth, as the result of their sins in a past life. Others disagree, and consider the critique as flawed and a misunderstanding of the karma theory.

== Comparable concepts ==
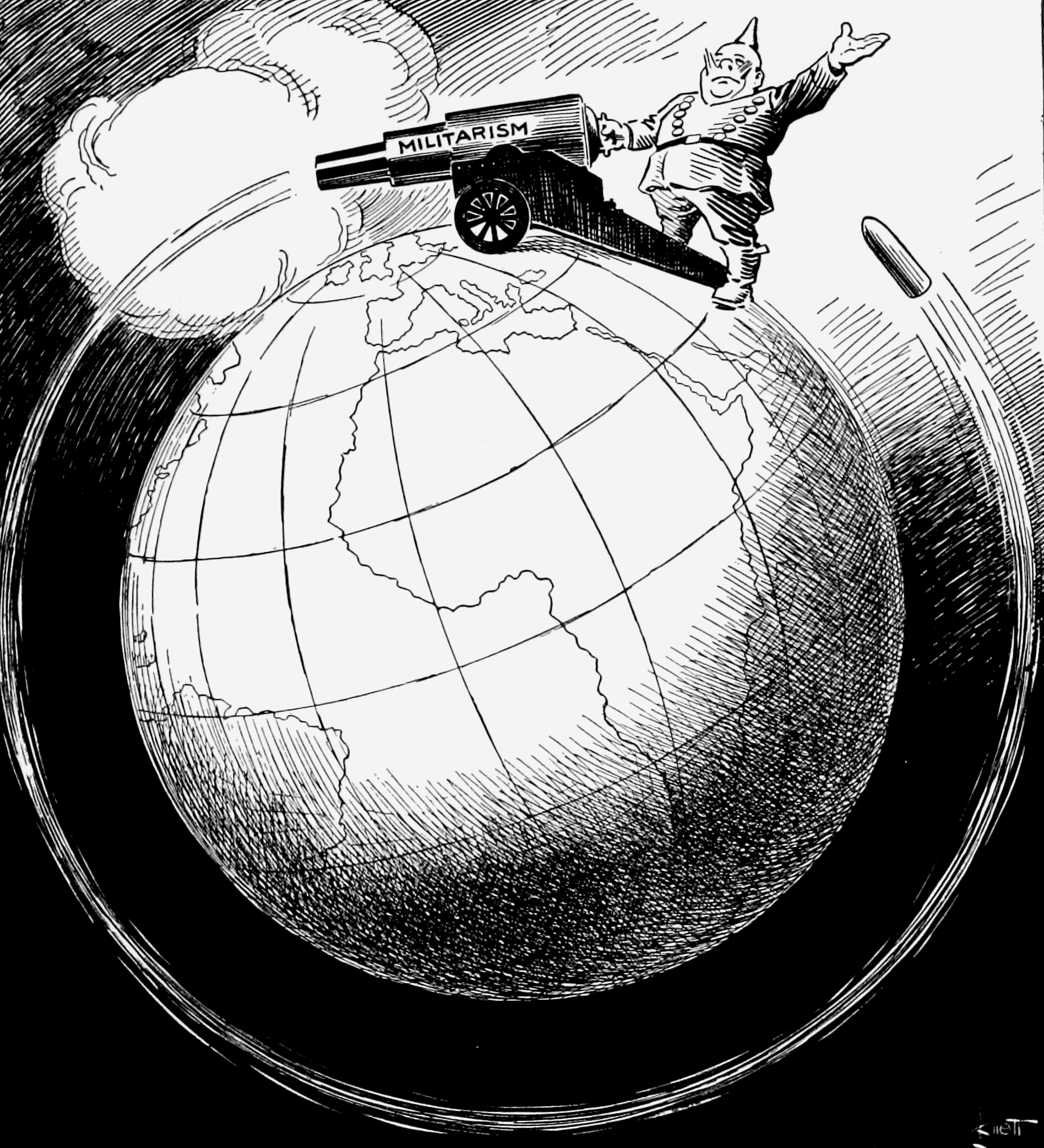
It Shoots Further Than He Dreams by John F. Knott, March 1918

Western culture, influenced by Christianity, holds a notion similar to karma, as demonstrated in the phrase "what goes around comes around".

=== Christianity ===
Mary Jo Meadow suggests karma is akin to "Christian notions of sin and its effects." She states that the Christian teaching on a Last Judgment according to one's charity is a teaching on karma. Christianity also teaches morals such as "one reaps what one sows" (Galatians 6:7) and "live by the sword, die by the sword" (Matthew 26:52). Most scholars, however, consider the concept of Last Judgment as different from karma, with karma as an ongoing process that occurs every day in one's life, while Last Judgment, by contrast, is a one-time review at the end of life.

=== Judaism ===
There is a concept in Judaism called in Hebrew midah k'neged midah, which is often translated as "measure for measure". The concept is used not so much in matters of law, but rather in matters of divine retribution for a person's actions. David Wolpe compared midah k'neged midah to karma.

=== Psychoanalysis ===
Carl Jung once opined on unresolved emotions and the synchronicity of karma:

When an inner situation is not made conscious, it appears outside as fate.

Popular methods for negating cognitive dissonance include meditation, metacognition, counselling, psychoanalysis, etc., whose aim is to enhance emotional self-awareness and thus avoid negative karma. This results in better emotional hygiene and reduced karmic impacts. Permanent neuronal changes within the amygdala and left prefrontal cortex of the human brain attributed to long-term meditation and metacognition techniques have been proven scientifically. This process of emotional maturation aspires to a goal of Individuation or self-actualisation. Such peak experiences are hypothetically devoid of any karma (nirvana or moksha).

=== Theosophy ===
The idea of karma was popularized in the Western world through the work of the Theosophical Society. In this conception, karma was a precursor to the Neopagan law of return or Threefold Law, the idea that the beneficial or harmful effects one has on the world will return to oneself. Colloquially this may be summed up as 'what goes around comes around.'

Theosophist I. K. Taimni wrote, "Karma is nothing but the Law of Cause and Effect operating in the realm of human life and bringing about adjustments between an individual and other individuals whom he has affected by his thoughts, emotions and actions." Theosophy also teaches that when humans reincarnate they come back as humans only, not as animals or other organisms.

== See also ==
- Adrsta
- Amor fati
- Anantarika-karma
- Causes of karma in Jainism
- Consequentialism
- Divine retribution
- Ethic of reciprocity ( = "Golden Rule")
- Hoʻoponopono § Freedom from karma
- Instant Karma!
- Judgement (afterlife)
- Just-world fallacy
- Karma yoga
- Luck
- Moksha
- My Name Is Earl
- Nishkam Karma
- Pratītyasamutpāda
- Saṅkhāra
- Self-fulfilling prophecy
- Tibetan Buddhist Philosophy of Karma
- Types of Karma
- Unintended consequence
- Vāsanā
- Work (Christian theology)
