= Praseodymium boride =

Praseodymium boride may refer to:

- Praseodymium tetraboride, PrB_{4}
- Praseodymium hexaboride, PrB_{6}
- Praseodymium dodecaboride, PrB_{12}
