= Judith Yang =

American physicist and materials scientist

Judith Chun-Hsu Yang (born 1964) is an American physicist and materials scientist whose research concerns electron microscopy and its application in studying nanostructures, catalysis, metal oxidation, and deoxidization. She works at the Brookhaven National Laboratory as head of the Electron Microscopy Group in the Center for Functional Nanomaterials.

== Education and career ==
Yang was born in 1964 in Champaign–Urbana, where her parents, immigrants from China and refugees from the Chinese Communist Revolution, were both graduate students, after having met as undergraduates in Texas. Her father, Tracy Chui-Hsu Yang, began working for the Lawrence Berkeley National Laboratory after completing his Ph.D. in 1968, and she grew up in the San Francisco Bay Area. She was an undergraduate physics major at the University of California, Berkeley, where she received her bachelor's degree in 1986. She continued her studies in physics at Cornell University, where she received a master's degree in 1989 and completed her Ph.D. in 1993. Her doctoral dissertation Structure and chemistry of nickel oxide-nickel platinum-platinum interfaces, was supervised by Stephen L. Sass.

With the support of a fellowship from the National Science Foundation, she became a postdoctoral researcher at the Max Planck Institute for Metals Research in Germany, and then at the University of Illinois Urbana-Champaign. After this, she joined the faculty at the University of Pittsburgh, where she was named as the Nickolas A. DeCecco Professor in 2011, and subsequently became the William Kepler Whiteford Professor.

From 2019 to 2022 she was on leave from the University of Pittsburgh to work as a program director for metals and metallic nanostructures and ceramics at the National Science Foundation, in the Division of Materials Research. She joined the Brookhaven National Laboratory in 2022. She continues to hold a position at the University of Pittsburgh, on leave.

== Recognition ==
Yang was named as a Fellow of the American Physical Society (APS) in 2016, after a nomination from the APS Division of Materials Physics, "for seminal contributions to in situ environmental transmission electron microscopy, the fundamental understanding of metal oxidation, and the application of nanomaterials and catalysis".
