= Timeline of Jorhat =

The timeline of Jorhat lists the important historical dates for the town of Jorhat in Assam.

== Timeline ==
=== 1700-1800 ===
Year	
April 1790	During the Moamoria rebellion Purnananda Buragohain, the Burhagohain of Gaurinath Singha, encamps at Dichoi, which became the nucleus of the town of Jorhat and continued to be the capital of the Ahoms till the end of their rule.
19 January 1794	Death of Gaurinath Singha.
February 1794	British forces led by Lieutenant MacGregor repulses the Moamarias near Jorhat who were demoralised and retreated to Rangpur. Captain Welsh reaches Jorhat to restore the Ahom Monarchy in upper Assam to its 'ancient form'.
July 1794	Process of shifting of capital from Rangpur to Jorhat during reign of Gaurinath Singha.
1795	Kamaleswar Singha ascended the throne.
17 January 1811	Death of Kamaleswar Singha.

=== 1800-1900 ===
Year	
1811	Chandrakanta Singha became the Ahom King.
1817	Death of Purnananda Buragohain.
February 1818	Ruchinath Burhagohain and Prince Brajanath arrives at Jorhat practically without resistance. Chandrakanta Singha, who had fled to Rangpur on their approach to Jorhat, was persuaded to return to the capital. But he was deposed on 20 February and sent as a prisoner to Taratali near Jorhat and then mutilated so as to be permanently disqualified for kingship.
1818–1819	Rule of Purandar Singha
1819	The Ahoms were defeated by an invading Burmese army and took a hasty retreat to Jorhat from Nazira.Purandar Singha fled to Guwahati and Chandrakanta Singha joined the Burmese. He became a nominal ruler and the real authority was vested with the Burmese.
1822	Chandrakanta Singha defeated at Mahgarh near Jorhat by the Burmese led by Mingimaha Bandula.
1822–1824	Atrocities and looting by "Mann" – Burmese Soldiers.
1821–1825	Jogeswar Singha was confirmed vassal king by the Burmese. The rule of the Burmese who obtained complete mastery over Assam continued.
1825	Defeat of the Burmese by the British forces led by Lt. Col. Alfred Richards. British forces engaged with Burmese forces of Jorhat and at Rangpur the Burmese surrenders practically without any resistance (30 January).
1826	The Burmese King no longer capable of offering resistance to the British forces concludes the Treaty of Yandaboo on 24 February. The British force was led by General Sir Archibald Campbell. The Burmese forces 'renounced all claims' and agreed to 'abstain from all future interference with, the principality of Assam and its dependencies'.
1825	Death of Jogeswar Singha
28 February 1826	David Scott appointed as first Senior Commissioner, Western Assam and Agent to Governor, General with H.Q. at Guwahati Colonel Richards became the first Junior Commissioner in charge of Eastern Assam with H.Q. at Rangpur. The two administrative units came to be known as Senior Khanda and Junior Khanda. Lt. Colonel Cooper appointed as political Agent, Upper Assam and Jr. Commissioner at Rangpur.
1828	John Bryan Neufville was appointed as Political Agent, Upper Assam and Junior Commissioner at Rangpur. Gomdhar Konwar declares himself king. The revolt was suppressed by the British and later on he was sentenced to 14 years imprisonment.
1830	Death of J.B. Neufville at Jorhat. Revolt by Peoli Borphukon and Jeuram Dulia Baruah suppressed and both were later sentenced to death.
September 1831	Lient. J. Mathie joined as the Political Agent of Upper Assam. 1 October 1831 Major Adam White joined as the Political Agent of Upper Assam.
2 March 1833	Purandar Singha was recognised as the tributary ruler of a part of Eastern Assam. According to the engagement with the British Govt. He undertook to pay an annual tribute of Rs 50,000. Jorhat was made the capital of the new state.
16 September 1838	The East India Company annexes Purandar Singha's territory and grants him a pension of Rs. 1000, which he refused to accept.
1838	Captain J. Brodie became the Principal Assistant to the Agent of the Governor General, Sibsagar. "Buranji Vivek Ratna" was written by Moniram Baruah. He was the first Chronicler of Jorhat. First police station established.
1839	Death of Chandrakanta Singha. Maniram Baruah was appointed as Dewan of Assam Tea Company, Nazira.
1839–40	Land Settlement of Assam announced. The Khel System was abolished and assessments were fixed on the area under cultivation at the rate of one rupee per pura on rupit land, and eight annas for other lands.
1840	Sagarmal Baid founder "Borgola" a trading centre at Jorhat.
1841–42	Population census carried out by British Govt. Total population of Sibsagar district was calculated at 157,632.
	Jalkar poll tax abolished (A tax paid by paiks for their roopit and garden (bari) land as an equivalent for exemption of these lands from assessment).
1843–44	Maniram Dewan established a tea garden at Chinamora.
1 October 1846	Death of Purandar Singha.
1847	Maidam of Purandar Singha excavated by East India Company. First steam boat plied on the Brahmaputra.
1850	A devastating flood swept away Bhugdoi bridge and changed its course.
10 June 1852	Death of Kameswar Singha, son of Purandar Singha.
1856	Jorhat Christian school opened.
7 September 1857	Kandarpeswar Singha was arrested and sent to Calcutta by Captain C. Holroyd.
26 February 1858	Maniram Dewan and Peali Baruah hanged to death at Jorhat.
1858	Jorhat Tea company was formed.
10 January 1869	A devastating flood, earthquake tremor at Jorhat.
16 February 1869	Jorhat declared as a Sub-Division of Rangpur District.
1867	George Williamson school for technical education started, but technical classes were not started.
1869	Nagar Unnayan Samity came into being (Town development Committee).
1870	A Munsifs court was opened at Jorhat for the first time.
1871	"Assam Bilashini" a monthly magazine published from Majuli.
1871–72	Extensive use of Court at Jorhat among the general people.
June 1873	Willamson School was opened.
1876	"Assam Dipak" published from Majuli. Gymkhana club established temporarily at Garmur.
16 January 1877	First horse race started at Gymkhana horse course.
1880	Death of Kandarpeswar Singha.
1881	Jorhat Union Board for Urban development was established.
1883	Kohima High School was closed and amalgamated with Willamson School forming Govt. High School at Jorhat.
1884	"Jorhat Sarbajanik Sabha" came into existence under the leadership of Jagannath Barooah.
9 December 1884	First train introduced from Jorhat to Gossaingaon.
1885–1886	Establishment of Cinamora Miller M.E. School.
1891	Freedom fighter Seikeh Bahadur Gaonbura dies.
1894	Establishment of Bezbaruah High School.
1896	Jorhat Muktob Adarsha Primary School establishment. Temporary theatre hall established.
12 June 1897	Earthquake at Jorhat at 5–23 p.m.
1898	Permanent theatre hall established.
1902	Kenduguri M.E .School established.

=== 1900-2000 ===
Year	
1904	First printing press "Darpan" opened.
4 April 1907	Death of Jagannath Barooah.
1909	Jorhat Municipality was formed.
1910	Jorhat Tennis Club established.
1911	Toklai experimental station established. Jorhat declared as district headquarters of Sibsagar district.
1912	Shifting of District Headquarters from Rangpur to Jorhat.
6 August 1912,	Chief Commissioner Sir Archedale Enle I.C.S. visits Jorhat.
1912	Shanti Ashram presently known as Assam Bongia Sarasat Math was established by Swami Nigamananda.
1913	First newspaper Axom Bilashini edited by Krishna Kanta Bhattacharjya-Published.
1915	"Jorhat Sahitya Sabha" established.
1918	First election of municipality was held and K K Baruah was the first elected chairman. First school magazine of Assam "Prabhat" was published from Normal school, Jorhat Sarat Chandra Goswami was the first editor.
1921	Baligaon Sanmilani Natya Mandir established.
9 September 1923	Death of Chandrakanta Handique
1923	Generation of Electricity by Kashinath Saikia at the cost of Rs 70,000.
1924	Water supply project started.
	Another school magazine "Jeuti" was published from Jorhat Boys Government High School.
1925	"AXOM HITOIXINI" edited by Durgadhar Borkatoky published.
1926	Sir John, Governor of Assam, inaugurates the Chandra Kanta Handique Bhawan. Dharma Sanmiloni Sabha established at Borigaon.
1927	Prince of Wales Engineering Institute established. "Tarajan Sanmilani Mandir" established.
1928	First aeroplane lands at Khalmati. The GI-AA-X plane was piloted by Barnard Leete.
1929	Death of Ruhini Hati Baruah (freedom fighter)
1930	Publication of Sadinia Batori from Thengal Bhawan.
10 October 1930	Jagannath Boruah College established with 14 students.
1931	Lord Irwin, Viceroy of India visits Jorhat Black flag, demonstrations by Debeswar Sarma, Shankar Baruah, Apirah Ram Gogoi, Sarbeswar Bordoloi, Chandra Kanta Baruah and other leaders.
	Talkie film Alam-Ara shown at Thengal Bhawan. This was the first Indian film shown at Jorhat.
	The Imperial Telegraph Training and Commercial Institute, Jorhat came into existence.
1932	First Indian appointed as Deputy Commissioner (Pachu Gopal Mukherjee ICS)
12 August 1935,	Publication of "Dainik Batory" from Thengal Dhawan Edited by Nilmoni Phukon.
1935	Establishment of Charigaon M.V. Balika Vidyalaya.
27 June 1936	Recording of "Jerengar Sati" by Ganesh Gogoi and his team from Jorhat at Meghaphone Company, Calcutta.
1937	Co-acting started at Jorhat Theatre hall. First actress was Gunabala Gogoi.
1938	Shiva Prasad Baruah, Tea planter and philanthropists died.
1939–40	Jorhat Sanskrit College was started.
1942	Establishment of Jagannath Barooah Aryya Vidyalaya at Baligaon.
	Rowriah Aerodrome functioned one US DC-3 plane (Dakota) landed first.
	Charigaon was declared an independent state. Lakhyeswar Baruah was the President of it with other cabinet ministers.
1946	Ross Institute for research of Malaria and other tropical diseases established under the auspices of Indian Tea Association.
	Jorhat Club established.
	Jorhat Sangeet Vidyalaya established.
1947	Industrial Training Centre (Converted to ITI in 1961) established.
10 March 1947	Publication of "Saptahik Janambhumi" (first issue)
1948	Assam Agriculture College established.
	Death of Gagot Saikia freedom fighter and Minister of self declared Charigaon State.
6 December 1949	First Ranji Trophy Cricket match played (Holkar XI vs Assam)
1950	Devastating earthquake. Headquarters of ATPA established.
1952	Establishment of Jorhat Stadium.
26 January 1952	Death of Radha Kanta Handique.
4 October 1953	Death of Surendranath Buragohain, first Central Government Minister from Assam.
1954	Establishment of Coal Survey Laboratory.
1955	DCB Girls College established.
December 1958	Vice-president of India Sri Sarbapalli Radhakrishnan visits Jorhat.
9 November 1959	First cricket match with foreign team played (West Indies v/s East Zone)
6 May 1960	Jorhat Engineering college established.
1961	Regional Research Laboratory established.
1964	Tea Research Association came into being.
1969	Assam Agriculture college converted to A.A.U.
23 August 1969,	Death of Hari Narayan Baruah founder of Assam Village Defence Party.
1969	Dr. Zakir Hussain President of India visits Jorhat.
1971	Office of the U.A. Commissioner established.
1 June 1972	Publication of "Dainik Janambhumi" (first issue)
28 Sep 1973	Death of Khan Sahib, Khan Bahadur Zahiruddin Ahmed(Retd Headmaster Jorhat Govt Boys High School)
1974	Opening Blind School.
1975	Establishment of J.K.S. Homeo Medical college.
1976	President of India Fakhruddin Ali Ahmed visits Jorhat.
6 February 1978	Morarji Desai, Prime Minister of India, visits Jorhat
12 May 1978	Neelam Sanjeeva Reddi, President of India, visits Jorhat.
7 June 1982	Death of Krishnakanta Handique.
1986	Giani Zail Singh, Home Minister of India, visits Jorhat
1987	Publication of "City Guide" of Jorhat The first yellow pages of Jorhat
20 May 1991	All India Radio, Jorhat station established.
5 January 1992	Death of Debeshwar Sarma.
1 May 1992	Doordarshan relay centre established
16 June 1994	Publication of "The Eastern Clarion", the first English daily newspaper of Upper Assam.
23 June 1994	Death of Imdad Ali (Retired IGP and Indian diplomat)
3 March 1995	President of India, Dr Shankar Dayal Sarma, visits Jorhat in connection with the centenary celebration of Jananayak Debeshwar Sarma.
14 November 1996	Children Library opened

=== 2000-present ===
Year	
December 2007	Death of Gopal Chandra Goswami, an eminent educationist of the region.
12 October 2009	Hon'ble Chief Minister of Assam Sjt Tarun Gogoi inaugurated the hospital wing of the Jorhat Medical College
6 May 2011	Shanti Asram presently known as Assam Bongia Sarasat Math was established by Swami Nigamananda, completed 100 Years of its life.
8 May 2011	The Golaghat district administration has ordered a joint survey of the proposed Deopahar reserve forest at Numaligarh.
11 Jan 2013	Jorhatmycity.com – The First Yellow pages of Jorhat published both in Print and online version.
