= Choudwar =

- Town
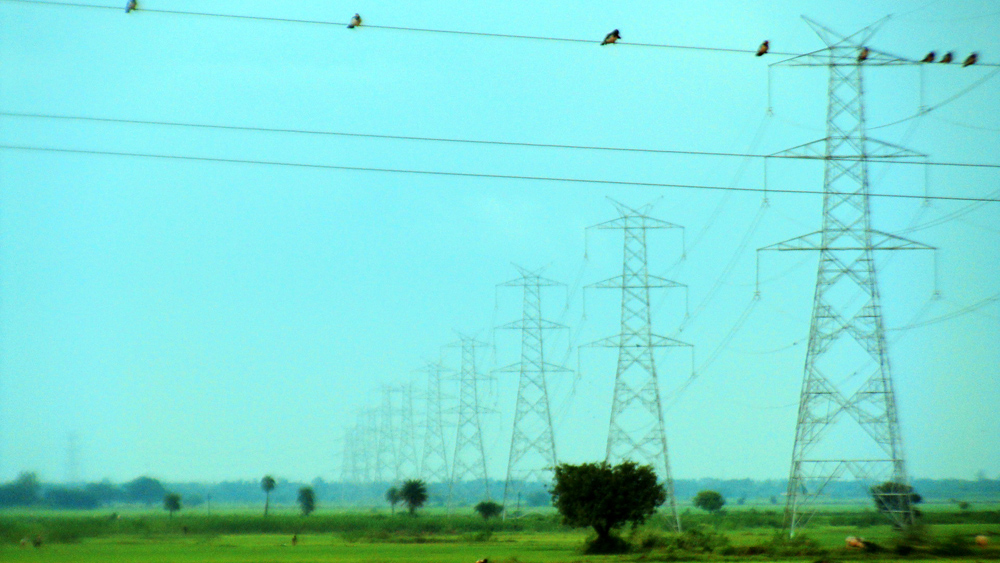
- Choudwar

- Location in Odisha Choudwar (India)
- Coordinates: 20°32′00″N 85°55′02″E
- Country: India
- State: Odisha
- District: Cuttack
- Languages: Odia

Population (2011)
  - Total: 52,394
- Time zone: IST (+5.30)
- Postal code: 754025
- Area code: 0671
- Vehicle registration: OR-05

Choudwar is a town and a municipality in Cuttack district in the Indian state of Odisha. It comes under Bhubaneswar-Cuttack commissionerate.

Choudwar is located on the banks of the river Mahanadi, on National Highway 42. Choudwar has the unique distinction of being an industrially significant zone in Odisha state.Choudwar once served as the capital for the Somakuli Keshari Kings of Odisha. Eight prominent Siva Pithas were established by the Keshari dynasty in the vicinity of Choudwar, which are now in ruins.

== Geography ==
Choudwar is located on the banks of Mahanadi and Birupa river near 16 and 55 National Highway. It is adjoining Cuttack, a city in Odisha. The STD code for Choudwar is 0671 with 754025, 754071, 754072, and 754028 postal codes. Choudwar comes under the Bhubaneswar–Cuttack Police Commissionerate which is an upcoming twin-city as per the plan of the Government of Odisha Vision 2030.

== History ==
Choudwar was thought to be an important center during Somavanshi Keshari kingdom of Odisha. The Keshari dynasty established eight prominent Shakta pitha shrines near Chodova, which are now in ruins.

In mythology, it was the capital of Virat, the brother-in-law of Kichaka. The Pandava brothers took refuge in Choudwar during their exile. The name Choudwar is made of two words: Chou implying Four and Dwar which means gate. The name alludes to existence of an old fort, which had four gates. The Baidheshwar temple near Agrahat village has an aquatic spring believed to have been dug with the archery of Arjun. Archaeological Survey of India found many artefacts around these location pointing to ancient settlements. Ten acres of the land has been fenced by the Archaeological survey of India. It has become a tourist place surrounded by a beautiful gardens.

== Education ==
There are a number of secondary schools and colleges in Choudwar:

=== Secondary schools ===
The following is a list of schools affiliated with the Board of Secondary Education.

- Agrahat High school, Agrahat, Choudwar
- Charbatia UGME and High School.
- Gopabandhu High School.
- Jhoteswar High School, Mundamal (Ward 6).
- Kalinga Public High School.
- Kalinga Vidyapitha
- Municipal Govt High School, Choudwar
- Nigamananda Bidyapitha, named after Swami Nigamananda.
- Nigamananda Girls high School, Daulatabad.
- Odisha Textile Mills High School
- Saraswati Shishu Vidya Mandir, Gandhi Chhak, Choudwar
- Saraswati Shishu Vidya Mandir, Sarada Nagara, Choudwar
- Kendriya Vidyalaya, Charbatia

=== Colleges ===
- Choudwar College, in affiliation with Utkal University offers three year undergraduate courses in sciences, arts, and commerce in accordance with the Council of Higher Secondary Education (CHSE). It is a co-educational institution.
- Choudwar Women's College is currently offering senior secondary education.
- Industrial Training Institute, ITT Technical Institute campus and Mechanical Trade of the Government of India offer apprenticeship curriculum.

== Industries ==
- Indian Metals & Ferro Alloys Limited (IMFA)
- Libra Carpets was functional until 1990s, after which it turned uneconomical and defunct.
- Odisha Textile Mills (OTM), a state owned fabric and textiles entity, was operational for more than three decades before it shut down over legal struggles
- The Titagarh Paper Mill (TPM) began paper and newsprint production in late 1950s until taken over by Ballarpur Industries and shutdown in 2003.
- Odisha Chief Minister Naveen Patnaik laid the foundation stone for the Rs 3,000-crore Welspun Group's Integrated Textiles Manufacturing Facility and Warehousing Complex on Feb 2024

== Demographics ==
According to the 2011 Census of India, Choudwar had a population of 42,597, of which 54% were males and 46% were females. It has an average literacy rate of 77%. The literacy rate for men was 83%, while for women it stood at 71%. 10% of the population was under 6 years old.

== Socio-economic conditions ==
The population of the town works predominantly in the private agencies. A downturn in employment was observed by the shutting down of OTM and BILT paper mills. A small segment of the population comprises teachers, local administration staff, doctors and government employees at the Charbatia Air Base.

== Transportation ==
Choudwar is well-connected due to presence of national highway, which connects Bhubaneswar, Sambalpur and Anugul. Nearest railway station is at 15 km distance in Cuttack. Bhubaneswar railway station in the capital is 42 km away. The town is also serviced via two smaller railway stations at Charbatia and Manguli. The nearest accessible airport is the Biju Patnaik International airport at 55 km distance. The Indian Air force operate a transport and surveillance airfield, exclusive to government use at ARC Charbatia.

== Politics ==
The current MLA from the Choudwar-Cuttack assembly constituency is Souvic Biswal of Biju Janata Dal. Previous MLAs from this seat were Dharmananda Behera (Biju Janata Dal, 2004), Bibhubhusan Praharaj (Independent, 2000), Raj Kishore Ram (Janata Dal, 1977 and 1990) and Kanhu Charan Lenka (Indian National Congress, 1980s & 1995) and Rasananda Sahu (Indian National Congress, 1980s & 1995). Choudwar is part of Cuttack (Lok Sabha constituency).
