= Anirvan =

Indian Hindu monk, writer and philosopher

Sri Anirvan
- Born: 8 July 1896; Mymensingh, Bengal Presidency, British India
- Died: 31 May 1978 (aged 81); Calcutta, West Bengal, India
- Occupations: Monk, philosopher, scholar, writer
- Writing career
- Language: Bengali, Sanskrit
- Period: Bengal Renaissance
- Notable works: Veda Mimamsa, Gayatri Mandala of the Rig Veda
- Notable awards: Rabindra Puraskar
- Website: www.haimavati-anirvan.org

Sri Anirvan (8 July 1896 – 31 May 1978), born Narendra Chandra Dhar, was an Indian Hindu monk, writer and philosopher. Widely known as a scholar, his principal works were a Bengali translation of Sri Aurobindo's The Life Divine and the three-volume treatise Veda Mimamsa.

== Early life and sannyas ==
Sri Anirvan was born on 8 July 1896 in the town of Mymensingh, then a part of British India and now in Bangladesh. His birth name was Narendrachandra Dhar. He was the son of Rajchandra Dhar, a doctor, and Sushila Devi. He was a spiritually and intellectually inclined child, who by age 11 had memorised the Astadhyayi of Pāṇini and the Bhagavad Gita. He was named Baroda Brahmachari after going through the sacred thread ceremony. He also won a state scholarship as a teen and completed university IA and BA degrees at the University of Dhaka and an MA from the Sanskrit College of the University of Calcutta.

At 16, he joined the Assam Bangiya Saraswata Math (the ashram), located in the village of Kokilamukh near Jorhat in Assam. He was a disciple of the ashram's founder, Paramahansa Srimat Swami Nigamananda Saraswati Dev, who initiated him into sannyas. Anirvan's new monastic name was Nirvanananda Saraswati. He taught at the ashram school and edited its monthly magazine Aryyadarpan.

== Scholar and writer ==
Some time after 1930, Nirvanananda changed his name to Anirvan and ceased to wear the ochre swami's robes. He travelled widely in North India, eventually returning to Assam and establishing an ashram in Kamakhya near Guwahati. However, he continued to travel. In the 1940s, he lived in Lohaghat and Almora. Madame Lizelle Reymond documented some of this period in My Life with a Brahmin Family (1958) and To Live Within (1971). During this time, Sri Anirvan translated Sri Aurobindo's The Life Divine into Bengali (as Divya Jeevan Prasanga); this book, his first, was published in two volumes between 1948 and 1951.

In 1953, Sri Anirvan moved to Shillong in Assam. His reputation as a Vedic scholar grew; and he wrote both in Bengali (chiefly) and in English (he was also fluent in French) on various aspects of Hindu philosophy (particularly Samkhya, the Upanishads, the Gita and Vedanta) and the parallels between Rigvedic, Puranic, Tantric and Buddhist thought. His magnum opus, Veda Mimamsa, was published in three volumes in 1961, 1965 and 1970. This work won him the Rabindra award.

Though Sri Anirvan was initiated as a monk, he studied subjects such as Marxism and gardening; yet he called himself a simple baul.

Sri Anirvan made his final move, to Calcutta, in 1965. He died on 31 May 1978, after a six-year illness.

== Works ==
1. Aditi (Bengali: অন্তর্যোগ). Kolkata: Sri Gautam Dharmapal, Haimavati Prakashani Trust.
2. Anirvan Aloya Patanjala Yoga-Prasanga; Edited & Translated by Sudipta Munsi; Calcutta: Prachi Publications. (Bengali). Published 2006.
3. Antaryoga (Bengali: অন্তর্যোগ). Kolkata: Haimavati Prakashani Trust, 1997 (Bengali year 1404), 3rd edition.
4. Aranyak (Bengali: অারণ্যক). Writings as Editor of Nagamananda Ashram magazine. Halishar: Assam Bangyiya Saraswat Math.
5. Bichitra (Bengali: বিচিত্রা). Kolkata: Smt Ramaa Choudhury, Haimavati-Anirban Trust, 1993.
6. Buddhi Yoga Of The Gita And Other essays.(Original in English.) Biblia Impex Pvt. Ltd. 1991, Madras, Samata Books.
7. Dakshinamurti (Bengali: দক্ষিণামূর্তি). 1969. Sreerampore, Hooghly: Sri Rabindranath Bandyopadhyay,.
8. Divya Jeevan (Translation Into Bengali Of "The Life Divine" by Sri Aurobindo. দিব্য জীবন প্রসঙ্গ).Pondicherry: Sri Aurobindo Ashram (Originally published 1948–51).
9. Divya Jeevan Prasanga (Bengali: দিব্য জীবন প্রসঙ্গ). Kolkata: Sri Aurobindo Pathamandir, 2000 (fourth edition). (Originally published 1958).
10. Gayatri Mandala Volumes 1–6. (Bengali). Undated.
11. Gitanuvachan (Bengali: গীতানুবচন). Vol I – 1968, Vol II – 1969, Vol III – 1970. Sreerampore, Hooghly: Sri Rabindranath Bandyopadhyay.
12. Inner Yoga (English) Translated by Simanta Narayan Chatterjee from "Antar Yoga." New Delhi: Voice of India.
13. Kaveri (Collection Of Poems) (Bengali: কাবেরী).1976. Kolkata: Sri Aurobindo Pathamandir
14. Lecture On the Immortality Of the Body in Sri Aurobindo's Yoga (Bengali:).1970. Kolkata: Sri Aurobindo Pathamandir
15. Letters From A Baul, Life Within Life. (original in English). 1983. Kolkata: Sri Aurobindo Pathamandir.
16. Pather Katha (Bengali). Published 2008.
17. Pather Sathi (Bengali: পথের সাথী). Halishar: Srimat Swami Jnananada Saraswati, Assam Bangyiya Saraswat Math, 1980. (Three volumes). Kolkata: Haimavati Anirvan Trust.
18. Patralekha (Bengali: পত্রলেখা). Vol I – 1968, Vol II – 1969, Sreerampore, Hooghly: Ritambhara. Vol III – 1980, Kolkata: Haimavati Anirvan Trust.
19. Patram Pushpam. 1982. Kolkata: Haimavati Prakashani Trust.
20. Prashnottari (Bengali: প্রশ্নোত্তরী). 1973. Sreerampore, Hooghly: Sri Rabindranath Bandyopadhyay. Halishar: Srimat Swami Jnananada Saraswati, Assam Bangyiya Saraswat Math, 2001 (Bengali year 1408), 2nd edition.
21. Pravachan (Bengali: প্রবচন). Vol I – 1962, Vol II – 1963, Vol III – 1966, Vol I – 1961, Vol IV – 1973. Sreerampore, Hooghly: Sri Rabindranath Bandyopadhyay. Later – Halishar: Srimat Swami Jnananada Saraswati, Assam Bangyiya Saraswat Math, 2002 (Bengali year 1409).
22. Pururava (Bengali). Published 1989.
23. Sahitya Prasanga (Bengali: সাহিত্য প্রসঙ্গ). 1980. Kolkata: Haimavati Prakashani Trust
24. Shiksha (Bengali: শিক্ষা). Vol I – 1962, Vol II – 1974. Assam Bangyiya Saraswat Math.
25. Snehashish (Bengali: স্নেহাশীষ). Vol I – 1971, Vol II – 1971, Vol III – 1972. Sreerampore, Hooghly: Ritambhara.
26. Upanishad Prasanga – Commentary on Aitareya Upanishad (Bengali: উপনিষৎ প্রসঙ্গ : ঐতরেয় উপনিষদ্). 1969. Burdwan University.
27. Upanishad Prasanga – Commentary on Ishopanishad (Bengali: উপনিষৎ প্রসঙ্গ : ঈশোপনিষদ্). 1967. Burdwan University.
28. Upanishad Prasanga – Commentary on Katha Upanishad — (Bengali: উপনিষৎ প্রসঙ্গ : কেনোপনিষদ্). 2009. Kolkata:
29. Upanishad Prasanga – Commentary on Kaushitaki Upanishad — (Bengali: উপনিষৎ প্রসঙ্গ : কেনোপনিষদ্). 2009. Kolkata:
30. Upanishad Prasanga – Commentary on Kenopanishad — (Bengali: উপনিষৎ প্রসঙ্গ : কেনোপনিষদ্). 1969. Kolkata: Haimavati Prakashani Trust
31. Upanishad Prasanga – Commentary on Mandukya Upanishad — (Bengali: উপনিষৎ প্রসঙ্গ : কেনোপনিষদ্). 2009. Kolkata:
32. Upanishad Prasanga – Commentary on Taittireya Upanishad — (Bengali: উপনিষৎ প্রসঙ্গ : কেনোপনিষদ্). 2009. Kolkata:
33. Uttarayan (Bengali: উত্তরায়ন). Kolkata: Smt Ramaa Choudhury, Haimavati-Anirban Trust, 1995.
34. Vedamimamsa (Bengali: বেদ মীমাংসা). Vol I – 1961, Vol II – 1965, Vol III – 1970. Winner of Rabindra Puraskar award. Kolkata: Government Sanskrit College.
35. Vedanta Jijnasa (Bengali: বেদান্ত জিজ্ঞাসা). Sreerampore, Hooghly: Sri Rabindranath Bandyopadhyay, 1965 (Bengali year 1372).
36. Yogasamanvaya Prasanga (Bengali: যোগসমন্বয় প্রসঙ্গ). 1967. Kolkata: Sri Aurobindo Pathamandir.

== Biographies ==
1. Section on Sri Anirvan in "Adhyatmavada Samskritite Acarya Satyananda" by Prof. Gita Haldar in Bengali. Undated.
2. Kathaprasange Sri Anirvan by Ayacaka in Bengali. Undated.
3. Mahajana Samvada by Prof. Govindagopal Mukherjee in Bengali. Undated.
4. Rishi Anirvan, biography of Sri Anirvan by Prof. Gita Haldar in Bengali. Published 2008.

5. Smriticarane Mahayogi Anirvan by Dilip Kumar Roy in Bengali. Undated.

== Books on Sri Anirvan and his philosophy ==
1. Akasabrahma by Ayacaka in Bengali. Undated.
2. My Life In A Brahmin Family by Lizelle Reymond. Translated from the French by Lucy Norton. Rider and Co. London. 1958.
3. To Live Within by Sri Anirvan and Lizelle Reymond, introduction by Jacob Needleman. Morninglight Press. 2007.

== See also ==
- Hindu idealism
- Hindu philosophy
