= IMFA =

Indian Ferro Chrome Producer Private

Indian Metals & Ferro Alloys Limited
- Type: Public Ltd. Co.
- Traded as: NSE: IMFA, BSE: 533047
- Industry: Metals, Power Generation
- Founded: 1961
- Founder: Dr. Bansidhar Panda and Mrs. Ila Panda
- Headquarters: Odisha, India
- Area served: India
- Key people: Subhrakant Panda (Managing Director)
- Revenue: ▲₹2,564.57 crore (US$270 million) (FY 24-25)
- Net income: ▲₹2,631.31 crore (US$270 million) (FY 24-25)
- Number of employees: 2101 (2025)
- Website: www.imfa.in

Indian Metals & Ferro Alloys (IMFA) is a fully integrated Indian producer of ferrochrome, headquartered in Bhubaneswar, Odisha.

Ferrochrome is primarily used in the production of stainless steel. IMFA exports its Ferrochrome to South Korea, China, Japan and Taiwan.

Indian Metals & Ferro Alloys Limited is a listed company in the National Stock Exchange and Bombay Stock Exchange.

== History ==
Indian Metals & Ferro Alloys (IMFA) was established in 1961 by Bansidhar Panda and Ila Panda. Bansidhar Panda completed advanced degrees from Michigan Technological University and Harvard University, before returning to Odisha to establish a ferroalloy plant at Therubali. His wife, Ila Panda, an alumna of Visva-Bharati University, supported the venture as was a patron of art and literature.

In 1967, IMFA commenced the manufacture of ferrosilicon in Odisha. The company later became the first firm in the Indian subcontinent to manufacture silicon metal using proprietary technology.

== Operation ==
As of 2 March 2026, IMFA has an installed furnace capacity of 289 MVA capable of producing 434,000 tonnes per annum (tpa), making it the largest value-added ferrochrome producer of the country.

In February 2026, the company completed the strategic acquisition of Tata Steel Limited’s (TSL) ferrochrome plant in Kalinganagar, Odisha. The transaction is valued at ₹707 crore, including a base consideration of ₹610 crore, along with GST and net working capital, and was funded entirely through internal accruals. The land area occupied by the plant is around 115 acres and includes four furnaces with an annual production capacity of 100,000 tonnes.

IMFA operates captive chrome ore mines at Sukinda and Mahagiri, along with manufacturing complexes at Therubali, Choudwar and Kalinganagar. It also has captive power generation comprising 200 MW from coal-based sources and 4.55 MW from solar.

As part of its diversification strategy, a 120 KLD grain-based ethanol plant is being set up at Therubali, Odisha.

In December 2024, IMFA partnered with JSW Green Energy One Ltd and JSW Green Energy Seven Ltd to source renewable energy for its smelting operations, consisting of 50 MW AC solar and 100 MW wind power. In May 2026, IMFA signed a 29-year captive PPA for 65 MW of hybrid renewable power usage in its ferrochrome production facilities. With the addition of the new project, the company’s total contracted renewable energy portfolio has increased to 135 MW.

== In popular culture ==
=== Sarala Puraskar ===
Sarala Puraskar is presented annually in recognition of outstanding contributions to the Odia language and literature. This award has been conferred since 1980 under the aegis of the Indian Metals Public Charitable Trust (IMPaCT), and managed by IMFA.

=== Ekalabya Puraskar ===
Ekalabya Puraskar, instituted in 1993 by IMPaCT, and managed by IMFA. This award aims to encourage young sportspersons from Odisha. It is regarded as one of the most prestigious recognitions in the field of sports in the state.
