= Praseodymium tetraboride =

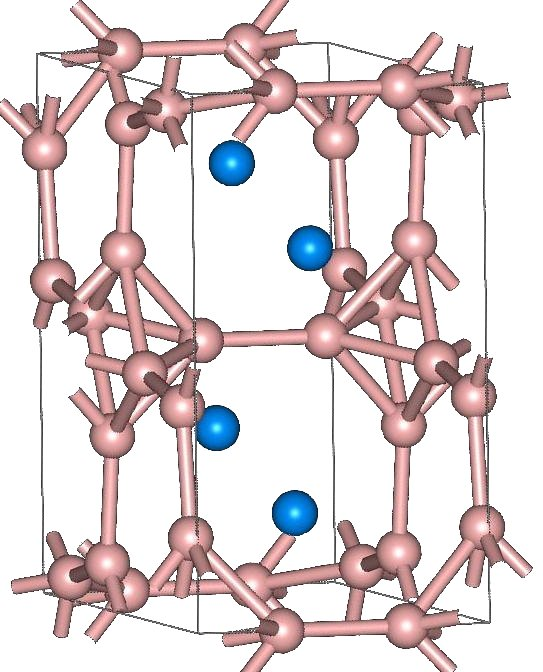

Names
- IUPAC name Praseodymium tetraboride

Identifiers
CAS Number	12007-78-2
3D model (JSmol)	Interactive image
- InChI: InChI=1S/4B.Pr Key: VWSAUODVKXTDCZ-UHFFFAOYSA-N
- SMILES: [Pr].[B].[B].[B].[B]

Properties
Chemical formula	PrB_{4}
Molar mass	184.15 g/mol
Density	5.6 g/cm^{3}
Melting point	2,350 °C (4,260 °F; 2,620 K)

Related compounds
Related compounds	Praseodymium hexaboride
- Except where otherwise noted, data are given for materials in their standard state (at 25 °C [77 °F], 100 kPa). Infobox references

Praseodymium tetraboride is a binary inorganic compound of praseodymium and boron with the chemical formula PrB_{4}.

== Preparation ==
Praseodymium tetraboride can be prepared by directly reacting the elements at 2350 °C:

Pr + 4 B → PrB_{4}

== Properties ==
Praseodymium tetraboride forms crystals of tetragonal system, space group P4/mbm, cell parameters a = 0.7242 nm, c = 0.4119 nm, Z = 4, structure like thorium tetraboride.

The compound is formed by a peritectic reaction and melts at 2350 °C.

At a temperature of 19.5 K, the compound undergoes a transition to an antiferromagnetic state, and at a temperature of 15.9 K, to a ferromagnetic state.
