= Copper(I) phosphide =

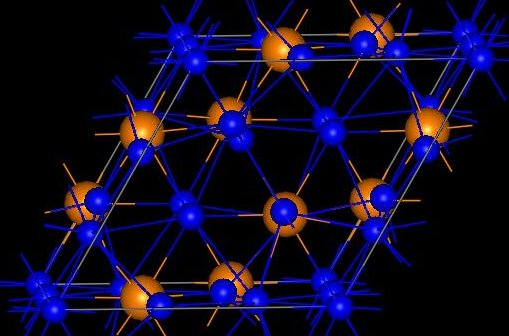

Names
- IUPAC name copper(I) phosphide
- Other names: Copper phosphide; Cuprous phosphide; Cuprophosphorus; Phosphor copper

Identifiers
CAS Number	12019-57-7
3D model (JSmol)	Interactive image
ChemSpider	9725097
ECHA InfoCard	100.031.485
PubChem CID	159399
CompTox Dashboard (EPA)	DTXSID60894785
- InChI: InChI=1S/3Cu.P/q3*+1;-3 Key: GKCDETHKBNXQFR-UHFFFAOYSA-N; InChI=1/3Cu.P/q3*+1;-3 Key: GKCDETHKBNXQFR-UHFFFAOYAH
- SMILES: [Cu+].[Cu+].[Cu+].[PH6-3]

Properties
Chemical formula	Cu_{3}P
Molar mass	221.6127 g/mol
Appearance	yellowish grey crystals
Melting point	900 °C (1,650 °F; 1,170 K)
Magnetic susceptibility (χ)	−33.0·10^{−6} cm^{3}/mol

Structure
Crystal structure	Na_{3}As (hexagonal, hP24)
Space group	P6_{3}cm, No. 185

Hazards
- NIOSH (US health exposure limits)
PEL (Permissible)	TWA 1 mg/m^{3} (as Cu)
REL (Recommended)	TWA 1 mg/m^{3} (as Cu)
IDLH (Immediate danger)	TWA 100 mg/m^{3} (as Cu)
- Except where otherwise noted, data are given for materials in their standard state (at 25 °C [77 °F], 100 kPa). verify (what is ?) Infobox references

Copper phosphide is an inorganic compound with the chemical formula Cu_{3}P, a phosphide of copper. It is a brittle, yellowish-grey solid.

== Properties ==
Copper phosphide does not react with water. It shows fluorescence when subjected to ultraviolet light.

== Structure ==
Recent crystallographic investigations have proven Cu_{3}P to be copper deficient, which means that the sum formula of this compound is more accurately expressed as Cu_{3−x}P.

== Production ==
Copper phosphide can be produced in a reverberatory furnace or crucible by the reaction of red phosphorus with a copper-rich material.

It can be prepared photochemically, by irradiating cupric hypophosphite with ultraviolet radiation.

It can also be produced by reducing copper(II) phosphate with aluminum.

== Uses ==
Copper phosphide has a role in copper alloys, namely in phosphor bronze. It is a very good deoxidizer of copper.
