= Praseodymium dodecaboride =

Names
- Other names Praseodymium boride

Identifiers
3D model (JSmol)	Interactive image
- InChI: InChI=1S/12B.Pr
- SMILES: [Pr].[B].[B].[B].[B].[B].[B].[B].[B].[B].[B].[B].[B]

Properties
Chemical formula	PrB_{12}
Molar mass	270.63 g/mol

Structure
Crystal structure	Cubic, UB_{12} type
Space group	Fm3̅m, No. 225
Lattice constant	a = 0.7577 nm
Formula units (Z)	4
- Except where otherwise noted, data are given for materials in their standard state (at 25 °C [77 °F], 100 kPa). Infobox references

Praseodymium dodecaboride is an inorganic compound of praseodymium and boron with the formula PrB_{12}. It is a boron-rich boride with the cubic UB_{12}-type structure. The compound was synthesized under high-pressure and high-temperature conditions after earlier attempts to prepare pure PrB_{12} had been unsuccessful.

== History ==
The stability of cubic rare-earth dodecaborides is strongly dependent on the size of the metal atom. Classical syntheses produced the UB_{12}-type compounds of the smaller rare-earth elements, while larger light-lanthanide ions did not form pure dodecaborides under ambient-pressure conditions. In 2016, Akopov and co-workers stabilized small concentrations of Pr in ZrB_{12}, but found a solubility limit of only about 4 at.% Pr. Pure PrB_{12} was subsequently obtained by high-pressure synthesis and reported in 2022.

== Preparation ==
Praseodymium dodecaboride was synthesized by Yusa, Iga and Fujihisa from a stoichiometric mixture of praseodymium hexaboride and elemental boron using a laser-heated diamond anvil cell.

PrB_{6} + 6 B → PrB_{12}

In situ X-ray diffraction showed formation of PrB_{12} at pressures of approximately 35 GPa. The need for such high pressure is attributed to the relatively large size of the Pr ion compared with the metal sites in the dodecaboride structure. Before the synthesis of pure PrB_{12}, Pr could be incorporated into the cubic dodecaboride structure as a solid solution with zirconium dodecaboride. In Zr_{1−x}Pr_{x}B_{12}, the solubility of Pr was only about 4 at.%, and attempts to obtain the pure Pr compound had been unsuccessful even under high pressure.

== Properties ==
=== Crystal structure ===
PrB_{12} crystallizes in the cubic crystal system with the UB_{12} structure type, space group Fm3̅m (No. 225). Its lattice parameter at ambient pressure is approximately a = 7.58 Å. The structure contains four PrB_{12} formula units per unit cell. Each praseodymium atom occupies the center of a large B_{24} truncated-octahedral cage. The boron atoms form a rigid three-dimensional covalent framework built from interconnected B_{12} cuboctahedra, characteristic of cubic metal dodecaborides. The UB_{12}-type structure can alternatively be regarded as a modified sodium chloride structure in which the two sublattices are occupied by praseodymium atoms and B_{12} cuboctahedral clusters.

=== Effect of pressure ===
The high formation pressure of PrB_{12} is related to the size of the praseodymium ion. Earlier rare-earth dodecaborides were primarily known for the smaller, heavier lanthanides, because their ions fit more readily inside the B_{24} cages. The minimum observed formation pressure of approximately 35 GPa is substantially higher than that of cerium dodecaboride, which forms at about 26 GPa despite cerium preceding praseodymium in the lanthanide series. This anomalous difference was attributed to partial Ce^{4+} character in CeB_{12}, which decreases the effective ionic radius of cerium. No comparable valence fluctuation was reported for PrB_{12}.

=== Mechanical properties ===
Conversion from the PrB_{6} structure to the PrB_{12} structure changes the praseodymium coordination environment from a truncated-cubic boron cage to a smaller truncated-octahedral cage. The resulting shortening of the Pr–B distances is associated with a greater bulk modulus and hardness in the dodecaboride than in the corresponding hexaboride. The high rigidity is also characteristic of the UB_{12} structure generally and results from the strongly covalently bonded three-dimensional boron framework.
