= Deoxidization =

Metallurgy/steelmaking method

Deoxidization is a method used in metallurgy to remove the rest of oxygen content from previously reduced iron ore during steel manufacturing. In contrast, antioxidants are used for stabilization, such as in the storage of food. Deoxidation is important in the steelmaking process as oxygen is often detrimental to the quality of steel produced. Deoxidization is mainly achieved by adding a separate chemical species to neutralize the effects of oxygen or by directly removing the oxygen.

== Oxidation ==
Oxidation is the process of an element losing electrons. For example, iron will transfer two of its electrons to oxygen, forming an oxide. This occurs all throughout as an unintended part of the steelmaking process.

Oxygen blowing is a method of steelmaking where oxygen is blown through pig iron to lower the carbon content. Oxygen forms oxides with the unwanted elements, such as carbon, silicon, phosphorus, and manganese, which appear from various stages of the manufacturing process. These oxides will float to the top of the steel pool and remove themselves from the pig iron. However, some of the oxygen will also react with the iron itself.

Due to the high temperatures involved in smelting, oxygen in the air may dissolve into the molten iron while it is being poured. Slag, a byproduct left over after the smelting process, is used to further absorb impurities such as sulfur or oxides and protect steel from further oxidation. However, it can still be responsible for some oxidation.

Some processes, while still able to lead to oxidation, are not relevant to the oxygen content of steel during its manufacture. For example, rust is a red iron oxide that forms when the iron in steel reacts with the oxygen or water in the air. This usually only occurs once the steel has been in use for varying lengths of time. Some physical components of the steelmaking process itself, such as the electric arc furnace, may also wear down and oxidize. This problem is typically dealt with by the use of refractory metals, which resist environmental conditions.

If steel is not properly deoxidized, it will have lost various properties such as tensile strength, ductility, toughness, weldability, polishability, and machinability. This is due to forming non-metallic inclusions and gas pores, bubbles of gas that get trapped during the solidification process of steel.

== Types of deoxidizers ==
=== Metallic deoxidizers ===
This method of deoxidization involves adding specific metals into the steel. These metals will react with the unwanted oxygen, forming a strong oxide that, compared to pure oxygen, will reduce the steel's strength and qualities by a lesser amount.

The chemical equation for deoxidization is represented by:

$nD + mO \longrightarrow D_ nO_m$

where n and m are coefficients, D is the deoxidizing agent, and O is oxygen.

Thus, the chemical equilibrium equation involved is:

$K_{eq} = a_{ox} / (a_D^n * a_O^m )$

where a_{ox} is the activity, or concentration, of the oxide in the steel, a_{D} is the activity of the deoxidizing agent, and a_{O} is the activity of the oxygen.

An increase in the equilibrium constant K_{eq} will cause an increase in a_{ox}, and thus more of the oxide product.

K_{eq} can be manipulated by the steel temperature via the following equation:

$log K_{eq} = A_D / T - B_D$

where A_{D} and B_{D} are parameters specific to different deoxidizers and T is the temperature in K°. Below are the values for certain deoxidizers at a temperature of 1873 K°.

| Deoxidizer | A | B | K_{eq} |
|---|---|---|---|
| Manganese | 12,440 | 5.33 | 1.318 |
| Silicon | 30,000 | 11.5 | 4.518 |
| Aluminum | 62,780 | 20.5 | 13.018 |

Below is a list of commonly used metallic deoxidizers:

- Ferrosilicon, ferromanganese, calcium silicide - used in steelmaking in production of carbon steels, stainless steels, and other ferrous alloys
- Manganese - used in steelmaking
- Silicon carbide, calcium carbide - used as ladle deoxidizer in steel production
- Aluminum dross - also a ladle deoxidizer, used in secondary steelmaking
- Calcium - used as a deoxidizer, desulfurizer, or decarbonizer for ferrous and non-ferrous alloys
- Titanium - used as a deoxidizer for steels
- Phosphorus, copper(I) phosphide - used in production of oxygen-free copper
- Calcium hexaboride - used in production of oxygen-free copper, yields higher conductivity copper than phosphorus-deoxidized
- Yttrium - used to deoxidize vanadium and other non-ferrous metals
- Zirconium
- Magnesium
- Carbon
- Tungsten

=== Vacuum deoxidation ===
Vacuum deoxidation is a method which involves using a vacuum to remove impurities. A portion of the carbon and oxygen in steel will react, forming carbon monoxide. CO gas will float up to the top of the liquid steel and be removed by a vacuum system.

As the chemical reaction involved in vacuum deoxidation is:

$C + O \longrightarrow CO$

the reaction between carbon and oxygen is represented by the following chemical equilibrium equation:

$K_{CO} = P_{CO}/(a_C * a_O)$

where P_{CO} is the partial pressure of the carbon monoxide formed.

Decreasing the oxygen activity(a_{O}) will raise the higher equilibrium constant, increasing CO production. To achieve this, subjecting the pool of steel to vacuum treatment decreases the value of P_{CO}, allowing for more CO gas to be produced.

=== Diffusion deoxidation ===
This method relies on the idea that deoxidation of slag will lead to the deoxidation of steel.

The chemical equilibrium equation used for this process is:

$K_{FeO} = a_{[O]} / a_{(O)}$

where a_{[O]} is the activity of the oxygen in the slag, and a_{(O)} is the activity of oxygen in the steel.

Reducing the activity in the slag (a_{[O]}) will lower the oxygen levels in the slag. Afterwards, oxygen will diffuse from the steel into the lesser concentrated slag. This method is done by using deoxidizing agents on the slag, such as coke or silicon. As these agents do not come into direct contact with the steel, non-metallic inclusions will not form in the steel itself.

== See also ==
- Smelting

== See also ==
- Desulfurization is the process of decreasing the sulfur content of steel.
- Decarburization is the process of decreasing the carbon content in metallurgy.
- Deoxidized steels are steels categorized by level of deoxidization treatment.
- Vacuum engineering
  - Vacuum metallurgy
