= Deoxidized steel =

Kind of steel

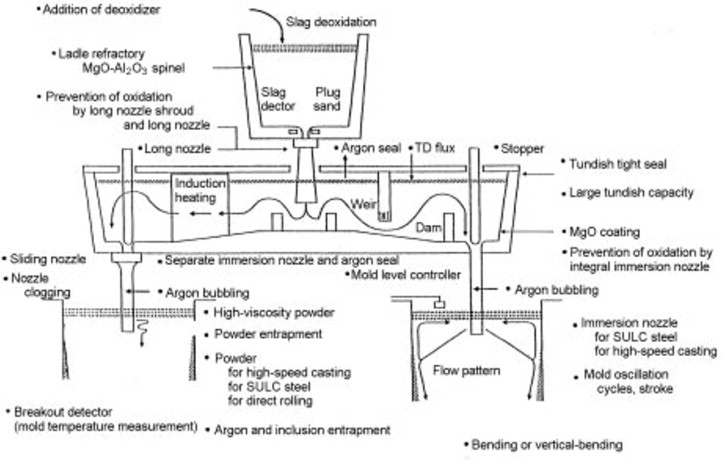
Deoxidized Steel

Deoxidized steel (also known as killed steel) is steel that has some or all of the oxygen removed from the melt during the steelmaking process. Liquid steels contain dissolved oxygen after their conversion from molten iron, but the solubility of oxygen in steel decreases with cooling. As steel cools, excess oxygen can cause blowholes or precipitate FeO. Therefore, several strategies have been developed for deoxidation. This may be accomplished by adding metallic deoxidizing agents to the melt either before or after it is tapped, or by vacuum treatment, in which carbon dissolved in the steel is the deoxidizer.

== Elements used for deoxidizing steel ==
Aluminium, silicon, and manganese are the most widely used elements for the deoxidation of steel. Usually, aluminium is added in the form of pellets or wire, while silicon and manganese in the form of ferroalloys. The reaction products obtained following the deoxidation of the liquid steel bath are respectively alumina, silica and manganese oxide:

2 Al + 3 O → Al_{2}O_{3}
Si + 2 O → SiO_{2}
Mn + O → MnO

The products of the deoxidation reaction are distributed within the slag produced by the steel deoxidation treatment. The slag can be skimmed off, therefore removing the dissolved oxygen from the liquid steel bath.

== Types ==
There are four types, ranging from fully deoxidized to slightly deoxidized: killed, semi-killed, rimmed, and capped. Note that none of the various types are better than the other as each is useful in its own regard.

== Killed steel ==
Killed steel is steel that has been completely deoxidized by the addition of an agent before casting such that there is practically no evolution of gas during solidification. It is characterized by a high degree of chemical homogeneity and freedom from gas porosities. The steel is said to be "killed" because it will quietly solidify in the mould, with no gas bubbling out. It is marked with a "K" for identification purposes.

For ingot casting, common deoxidizing agents include aluminium, ferrosilicon and manganese. Aluminium reacts with the dissolved gas to form aluminium oxide. The aluminium oxide precipitates provide the additional benefit of pinning grain boundaries, thereby preventing grain growth during heat treatments. For steels of the same grade a killed steel will be harder than rimmed steel.

The main disadvantage of killed steel is that it suffers from deep pipe shrinkage defects. To minimize the amount of metal that must be discarded because of the shrinkage, a large vertical mold is used with a hot top. Typical killed-steel ingots have a yield of 80% by weight.

Commonly killed steels include alloy steels, stainless steels, heat resisting steels, steels with a carbon content greater than 0.25%, steels used for forgings, structural steels with a carbon content between 0.15 and 0.25%, and some special steels in the lower carbon ranges. It is also used for any steel castings. Note that decrease in carbon content increases the problems with non-metallic inclusions.

Continuous casting and strip-casting technologies have largely superseded ingot casting techniques in recent times. Through these methods, all steel is killed and the resulting yields are close to 96%.

== Semi-killed ==
Semi-killed steel is mostly deoxidized steel, but the carbon monoxide leaves blowhole type porosity distributed throughout the ingot. The porosity eliminates the pipe found in killed steel and increases the yield to approximately 90% by weight. Semi-killed steel is commonly used for structural steel with a carbon content between 0.15 and 0.25% carbon, because it is rolled, which closes the porosity. It is also used for drawing applications.

Characteristics of semi-killed steels include:

- Structural steels containing 0.15 to 0.25% carbon are generally semi-killed.
- In semi-killed steel, the aim is to produce metal free from surface blowhole and pipe defects.
- The surface should have a sound skin of considerable thickness.
- They are used for general structural applications.
- During solidification of semi-killed steel, gas is evolved in the body of the ingot, tending to compensate in part or entirely for the shrinkage accompanying solidification.
- Since pipe cavities are minimized, semi-killed steels are usually cast in big-end-down molds without hot-tops.
- This type of steel is suitable for drawing operations (except severe drawing).

== Rimmed ==
Rimmed steel, also known as drawing quality steel, has little to no deoxidizing agent added to it during casting which causes carbon monoxide to evolve rapidly from the ingot. This causes small blow holes in the surface that are later closed up in the hot rolling process. Another result is the segregation of elements; almost all of the carbon, phosphorus, and sulfur move to the center of the ingot, leaving an almost perfect "rim" of pure iron on the outside of the ingot. This gives the ingot an excellent surface finish because of this iron rim, but also yields an ingot with the most segregated composition. Most rimmed steel has a carbon content below 0.25%, a manganese content below 0.6%, and is not alloyed with aluminum, silicon, and titanium. This type of steel is commonly used for cold-bending, cold-forming, cold-heading and, as the name implies, drawing. Due to the non-uniformity of alloying elements it is not recommended for hot-working applications.

== Capped ==
Capped steel starts as rimmed steel but part way through the solidification the ingot is capped. This can be done by literally covering the ingot mold or by adding a deoxidizing agent. The top of the ingot then forms into a solid layer of steel, but the rim of the rest of the ingot is thinner than in a rimmed steel. Also there is less segregation of impurities.

The yield of rimmed and capped steel is slightly better than that of semi-killed steel. These types of steels are commonly used for sheet and strip metal because of their excellent surface condition. It is also used in most cold-working applications.

Due to production processes, as the carbon content of rimmed and capped steel increases above 0.08%, the cleanliness decreases.

== See also ==
- Decarburized steel
