= Ferrosilicon =

Alloy of silicon and iron

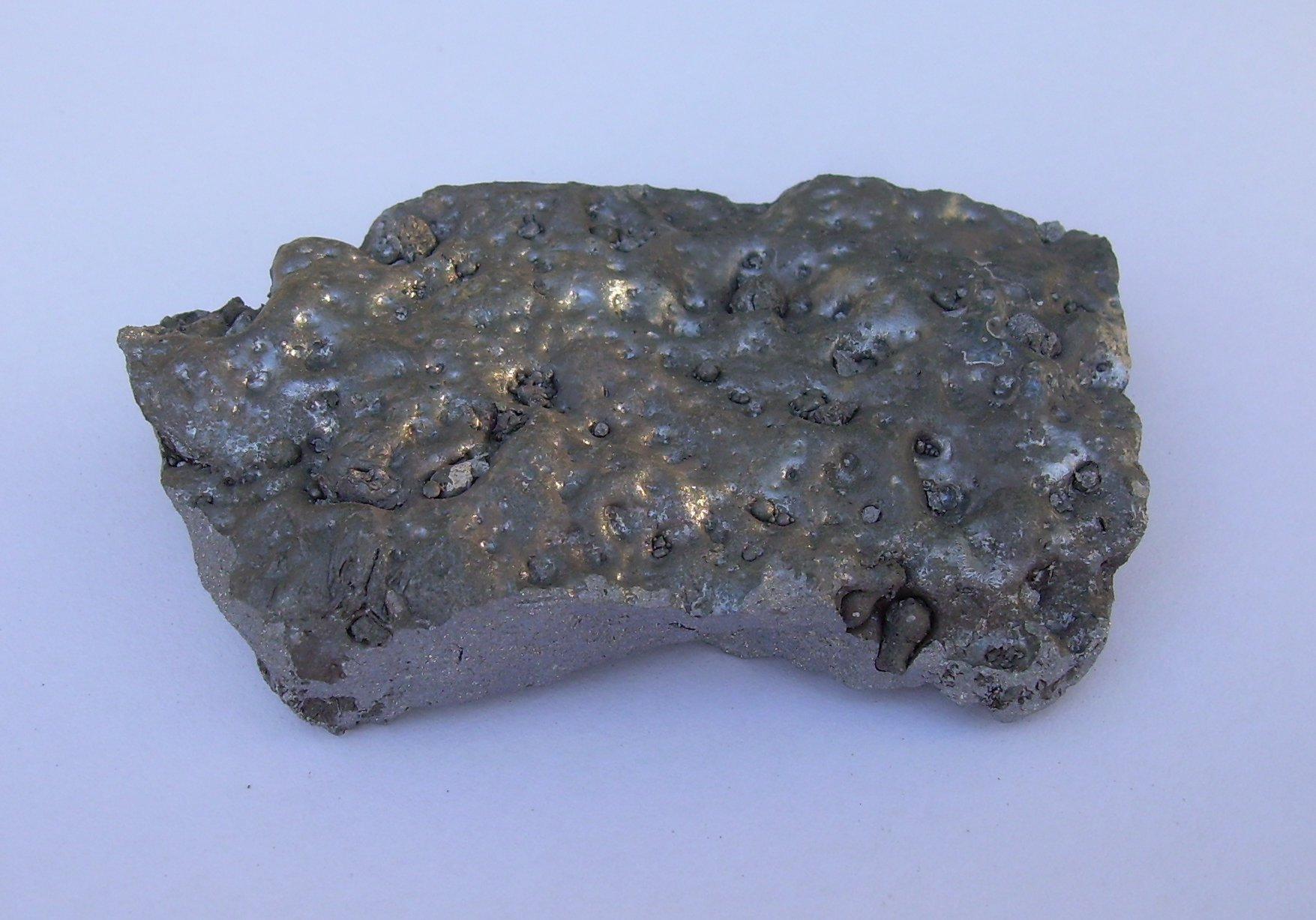
Ferrosilicon alloy

Ferrosilicon is an alloy of iron and silicon. It has a typical silicon content of 15–90% by weight and a high proportion of iron silicides.

== Production and reactions ==
Ferrosilicon is produced by reduction of silica or sand with coke in the presence of iron. Typical sources of iron are scrap iron or millscale. Ferrosilicons with silicon content up to about 15% are made in blast furnaces lined with acid fire bricks.

Ferrosilicons with higher silicon content are made in electric arc furnaces. The usual formulations on the market are ferrosilicons with 15%, 45%, 75%, and 90% silicon. The remainder is iron, with about 2% consisting of other elements like aluminium and calcium. An overabundance of silica is used to prevent formation of silicon carbide. Microsilica is a useful byproduct.

In contact with water, ferrosilicon may slowly produce hydrogen. The reaction, which is accelerated in the presence of base, can be used for hydrogen production.

The melting point and density of ferrosilicon depends on its silicon content, with two nearly-eutectic areas, one near Fe_{2}Si and second spanning the FeSi_{2} to FeSi_{3} composition range.

Physical properties of ferrosilicon
Si mass fraction (%)	Solidus point	Liquidus point	Density (g/cm^{3})
0 (Iron)	1,538 °C (2,800 °F)	1,538 °C (2,800 °F)	7.87
20	1,200 °C (2,190 °F)	1,212 °C (2,214 °F)	6.76
35	1,203 °C (2,197 °F)	1,410 °C (2,570 °F)	5.65
50	1,212 °C (2,214 °F)	1,220 °C (2,230 °F)	5.1
60	1,207 °C (2,205 °F)	1,230 °C (2,250 °F)	4.27
80	1,207 °C (2,205 °F)	1,360 °C (2,480 °F)	3.44
100	1,414 °C (2,577 °F)	1,414 °C (2,577 °F)	2.33

== Uses ==
Ferrosilicon is used as a source of silicon, to reduce metals from their oxides, and to deoxidize steel and other ferrous alloys. This prevents the loss of carbon from the molten steel (so called blocking the heat); ferromanganese, spiegeleisen, calcium silicides, and many other materials are used for the same purpose. It can be used to make other ferroalloys.

Ferrosilicon is also used for manufacture of silicon, corrosion-resistant and high-temperature-resistant ferrous silicon alloys, and silicon steel for electromotors and transformer cores. In the manufacture of cast iron, ferrosilicon is used for inoculation of the iron to accelerate graphitization. In arc welding, ferrosilicon can be found in some electrode coatings.

Ferrosilicon is a basis for manufacture of prealloys like magnesium ferrosilicon (MgFeSi), used for production of ductile iron. MgFeSi contains 3%–42% magnesium and small amounts of rare-earth elements. Ferrosilicon is also important as an additive to cast irons for controlling the initial content of silicon.

Magnesium ferrosilicon is instrumental in the formation of nodules, which give ductile iron its flexible property. Unlike gray cast iron, which forms graphite flakes, ductile iron contains graphite nodules, which make cracking more difficult.

Ferrosilicon is also used in the Pidgeon process to make magnesium from dolomite.

Historically, it was used to make Cilferite (also spelled Cilpherite): a military explosive containing ammonium nitrate, ferrosilicon (13.75%–14%), aluminum powder, and wood meal used in World War I by the British and the French. The former used Cilferite as filler for the Mills bomb No. 36, which was replaced in favor of the Baratol-filled No. 36M in 1932; all Cilferite-filled grenades were deemed as unsafe and destroyed by the end of 1932.

=== Silanes ===
Treatment of high-silicon ferrosilicon with hydrogen chloride is the basis of the industrial synthesis of trichlorosilane.

Ferrosilicon is also used in a ratio of 3%–3.5% in the manufacture of sheets for the magnetic circuit of electrical transformers.

== Hydrogen production ==
The method has been in use since World War I. Prior to this, the process and purity of hydrogen generation relying on steam passing over hot iron was difficult to control. The chemical reaction uses sodium hydroxide (NaOH), ferrosilicon, and water. While in the "silicol" process, a heavy steel pressure vessel is filled with sodium hydroxide and ferrosilicon, and upon closing, a controlled amount of water is added; the dissolving of the hydroxide heats the mixture to about 200 °F (93 °C) and starts the reaction; silicic acid, sodium hydroxide, hydrogen and steam are produced. The overall reaction of the process is believed to be:

2 NaOH + Si + (x + 2)H_{2}O → 2 NaOH + SiO_{2}·xH_{2}O + 2 H_{2}

Where the silicon is in the form of ferrosilicon. Because sodium silicate initially produced immediately hydrolyzes to hydrated silicic acid and sodium hydroxide, the sodium hydroxide is continually regenerated and is effectively a catalyst.

Ferrosilicon is used by the military to quickly produce hydrogen for balloons by the ferrosilicon method. The generator may be small enough to fit in a truck and requires only a small amount of electric power, the materials are stable and not combustible, and they do not generate hydrogen until mixed.

One report notes that this method of hydrogen production wasn't thoroughly investigated for about a century despite being reported by the US military in the beginning of 20th century.
