= Nigamananda Bidyapitha =

Educational institution in India

Coordinates: 20.510483°N 85.882171°E

Nigamananda Bidyapitha(निगमानंद बिद्यापिठ) is an educational institution established in 1963 in Daulatabad, India. The place is near to Choudwar Municipal area and adjacent to Cuttack City. It is in the state of Orissa, India.

The school is named after the yogi Nigamananda (योगी निगमानंद). The school offers education to students of upper primary and secondary classes.

== Other foundations named after yogi Nigamananda ==
Presently few foundations of Yoga, Education and Philosophy are running by Swami Nigamamanda followers in few places of India.

=== Yoga ===
- Swami Nigamananda Saraswati Yoga Vidya Kendra, Chennai
- Nigamananda Education and Literature
- Swami Nigamananda Ashram, Midnapur (WB)

=== Philosophy ===
- Nigamananda Math, Halisahar

=== Education ===
Institutions in Orissa

- Saraswata Bidyapitha, Biratunga
- Nigamananda Education Center, Ganjam (Orissa)
- Swami Nigamananda Educational Foundation, Bhubaneswar (Orissa)
- Thakur Nigamananda Mahavidyalaya, Barapara (Orissa)
- Nigamananda Vidya Niketan, School, Cuttack (Orissa)
- Nigamananda Bidyapitha, Daulatabad (Orissa)
- Nigamananda High School, Balasore (Orissa).
- Nigamananda Girls High School, Daulatabad (Orissa).
- Nigamananda Bidyapitha, Cuttack (Orissa).
- Nigamananda High School, Dhenkanal (Orissa).
- Nigamananda Bidyapitha, Jajpur (Orissa).
- Nigamananda U. Bidya Pitha, Kendrapara (Orissa).
- Nigamananda Sans. Vidyalaya, Khurda (Orissa).
- Nigamananda B.N.School, Khurda (Orissa).
- Sri Sri Thakura Nigamananda High School, Puri (Orissa).
- Nigamananda Ashram, Lokanath Road, Puri (Ashram)

Institutions in West Bengal

- Nigamananda Mahavidyalaya (University), Midnapur (West Bengal)
- Nigamananda Sebashram Higher Secondary School (West Bengal)
- Nigamananda High School, Kalna, (West Bengal)
- Nigamananda Junior Training College, Coochbihar (West Bengal)
- Sri Sri Nigamananda Adarsha Vidyniketan (Sr. 154), Jalpaiguri West Bengal.
