= Calcium hexaboride =

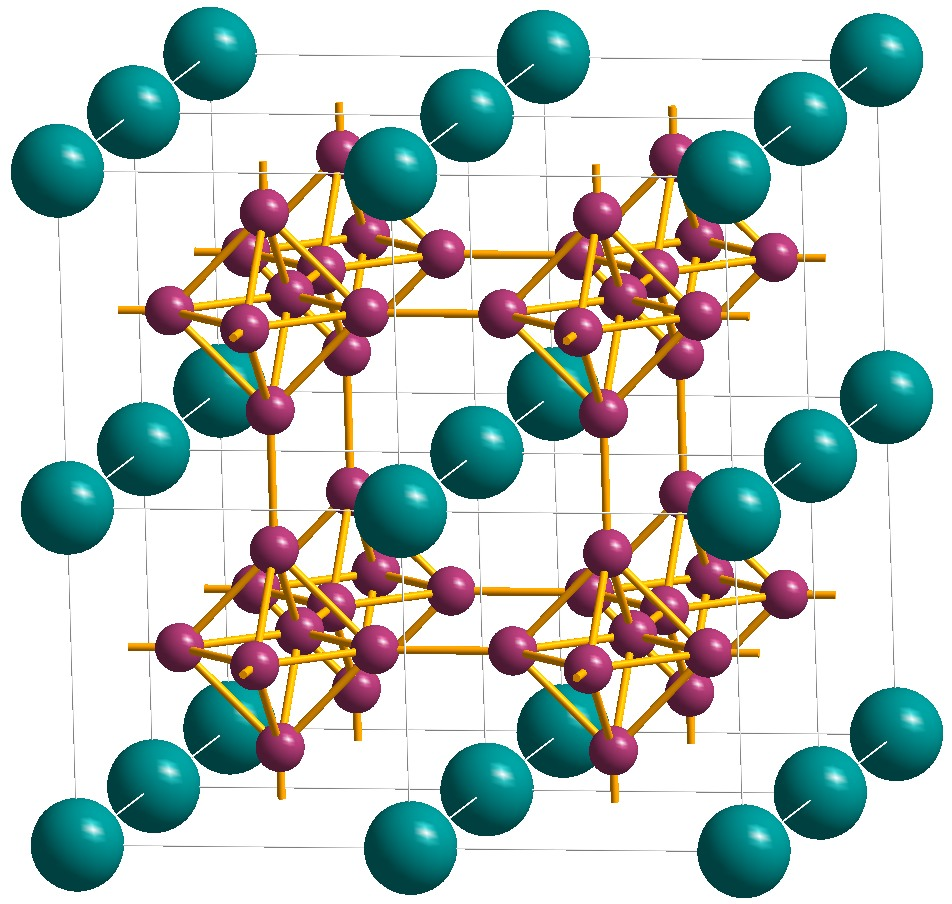

Names
- IUPAC name Calcium hexaboride
- Other names Calcium boride

Identifiers
CAS Number	12007-99-7
3D model (JSmol)	Interactive image
ChemSpider	24765176
ECHA InfoCard	100.031.374
EC Number	234-525-3
PubChem CID	16212529
CompTox Dashboard (EPA)	DTXSID30897723
- InChI: InChI=1S/B6.Ca/c1-2-3(1)5(1)4(1,2)6(2,3)5;/q-2;+2 Key: PXRBHCKHCRNGSE-UHFFFAOYSA-N; InChI=1/B6.Ca/c1-2-3(1)5(1)4(1,2)6(2,3)5;/q-2;+2
- SMILES: [B-]123B45B16[B-]47B52B376.[Ca+2]

Properties
Chemical formula	CaB_{6}
Molar mass	104.94 g/mol
Appearance	black powder
Density	2.45 g/cm^{3}
Melting point	2,235 °C (4,055 °F; 2,508 K)
Solubility in water	insoluble

Structure
Crystal structure	Cubic
Space group	Pm3̅m ; O_{h}
- Except where otherwise noted, data are given for materials in their standard state (at 25 °C [77 °F], 100 kPa). verify (what is ?) Infobox references

Calcium hexaboride (sometimes calcium boride) is a compound of calcium and boron with the chemical formula CaB_{6}. It is an important material due to its high electrical conductivity, hardness, chemical stability, and melting point. It is a black, lustrous, chemically inert powder with a low density. It has the cubic structure typical for metal hexaborides, with octahedral units of 6 boron atoms combined with calcium atoms. CaB_{6} and lanthanum-doped CaB_{6} both show weak ferromagnetic properties, which is a remarkable fact because calcium and boron are neither magnetic, nor have inner 3d or 4f electronic shells, which are usually required for ferromagnetism.

== Properties ==
CaB_{6} has been investigated in the past due to a variety of peculiar physical properties, such as superconductivity, valence fluctuation and Kondo effects. However, the most remarkable property of CaB_{6} is its ferromagnetism. It occurs at unexpectedly high temperature (600 K) and with low magnetic moment (below 0.07 $\mu_\mathrm{B}$ per atom). The origin of this high temperature ferromagnetism is the ferromagnetic phase of a dilute electron gas, linkage to the presumed excitonic state in calcium boride, or external impurities on the surface of the sample. The impurities might include iron and nickel, probably coming from impurities in the boron used to prepare the sample.

CaB_{6} is insoluble in H_{2}O, MeOH (methanol), and EtOH (ethanol) and dissolves slowly in acids. Its microhardness is 27 GPa, Knoop hardness is 2600 kg/mm^{2}), Young modulus is 379 GPa, and electrical resistivity is greater than 2·10^{10} Ω·m for pure crystals. CaB_{6} is a semiconductor with an energy gap estimated as 1.0 eV. The low, semi-metallic conductivity of many CaB_{6} samples can be explained by unintentional doping due to impurities and possible non-stoichiometry.

== Structural information ==
The crystal structure of calcium hexaboride is a cubic lattice with calcium at the cell centre and compact, regular octahedra of boron atoms linked at the vertices by B-B bonds to give a three-dimensional boron network. Each calcium has 24 nearest-neighbor boron atoms The calcium atoms are arranged in simple cubic packing so that there are holes between groups of eight calcium atoms situated at the vertices of a cube. The simple cubic structure is expanded by the introduction of the octahedral B_{6} groups and the structure is a CsCl-like packing of the calcium and hexaboride groups. Another way of describing calcium hexaboride is as having a metal and a B_{6}^{2−} octahedral polymeric anions in a CsCl-type structure where the Calcium atoms occupy the Cs sites and the B_{6} octahedra in the Cl sites. The Ca-B bond length is 3.05 Å and the B-B bond length is 1.7 Å.

^{43}Ca NMR data contains δ_{peak} at −56.0 ppm and δ_{iso} at −41.3 ppm where δ_{iso} is taken as peak max +0.85 width, the negative shift is due to the high coordination number.

Raman Data: Calcium hexaboride has three Raman peaks at 754.3, 1121.8, and 1246.9 cm^{−1} due to the active modes A_{1g}, E_{g}, and T_{2g} respectively.

Observed Vibrational Frequencies cm^{−1} : 1270(strong) from A_{1g} stretch, 1154 (med.) and 1125(shoulder) from E_{g} stretch, 526, 520, 485, and 470 from F_{1g} rotation, 775 (strong) and 762 (shoulder) from F_{2g} bend, 1125 (strong) and 1095 (weak) from F_{1u} bend, 330 and 250 from F_{1u} translation, and 880 (med.) and 779 from F_{2u} bend.

== Preparation ==
- One of the main reactions for industrial production is:

CaO + 3 B_{2}O_{3} + 10 Mg → CaB_{6} + 10 MgO

Other methods of producing CaB_{6} powder include:

- Direct reaction of calcium or calcium oxide and boron at 1000 °C;

Ca + 6B → CaB_{6}

- Reacting Ca(OH)_{2} with boron in vacuum at about 1700 °C (carbothermal reduction);

Ca(OH)_{2} +7B → CaB_{6} + BO(g) + H_{2}O(g)

- Reacting calcium carbonate with boron carbide in vacuum at above 1400 °C (carbothermal reduction)
- Reacting of CaO and H_{3}BO_{3} and Mg to 1100 °C.
- Low-temperature (500 °C) synthesis

CaCl_{2} + 6NaBH_{4} → CaB_{6} + 2NaCl + 12H_{2} + 4Na

results in relatively poor quality material.

- To produce pure CaB_{6} single crystals, e.g., for use as cathode material, the thus obtained CaB_{6} powder is further recrystallized and purified with the zone melting technique. The typical growth rate is 30 cm/h and crystal size ~1x10 cm.
- Single-crystal CaB_{6} Nanowires (diameter 15–40 nm, length 1–10 micrometres) can be obtained by pyrolysis of diborane (B_{2}H_{6}) over calcium oxide (CaO) powders at 860–900 °C, in presence of Ni catalyst.

== Uses ==
Calcium hexaboride is used in the manufacturing of boron-alloyed steel and as a deoxidation agent in production of oxygen-free copper. The latter results in higher conductivity than conventionally phosphorus-deoxidized copper owing to the low solubility of boron in copper. CaB_{6} can also serve as a high temperature material, surface protection, abrasives, tools, and wear resistant material.

CaB_{6} is highly conductive, has low work function, and thus can be used as a hot cathode material. When used at elevated temperature, calcium hexaboride will oxidize degrading its properties and shortening its usable lifespan.

CaB_{6} is also a promising candidate for n-type thermoelectric materials, because its power factor is larger than or comparable to that of common thermoelectric materials Bi_{2}Te_{3} and PbTe.

CaB also can be used as an antioxidant in carbon bonded refractories.

== Precautions ==
Calcium hexaboride is irritating to the eyes, skin, and respiratory system. This product should be handled with proper protective eyeware and clothing. Never put calcium hexaboride down the drain or add water to it.

== See also ==
- Boride
- Calcium
