= Calcium silicide =

Calcium silicide may refer to

- Dicalcium monosilicide, Ca_{2}Si
- Calcium monosilicide, CaSi
- Calcium disilicide, CaSi_{2}
