= Shanti Ashram =

Hindu Monastery in Assam, India

- শান্তি আশ্রম
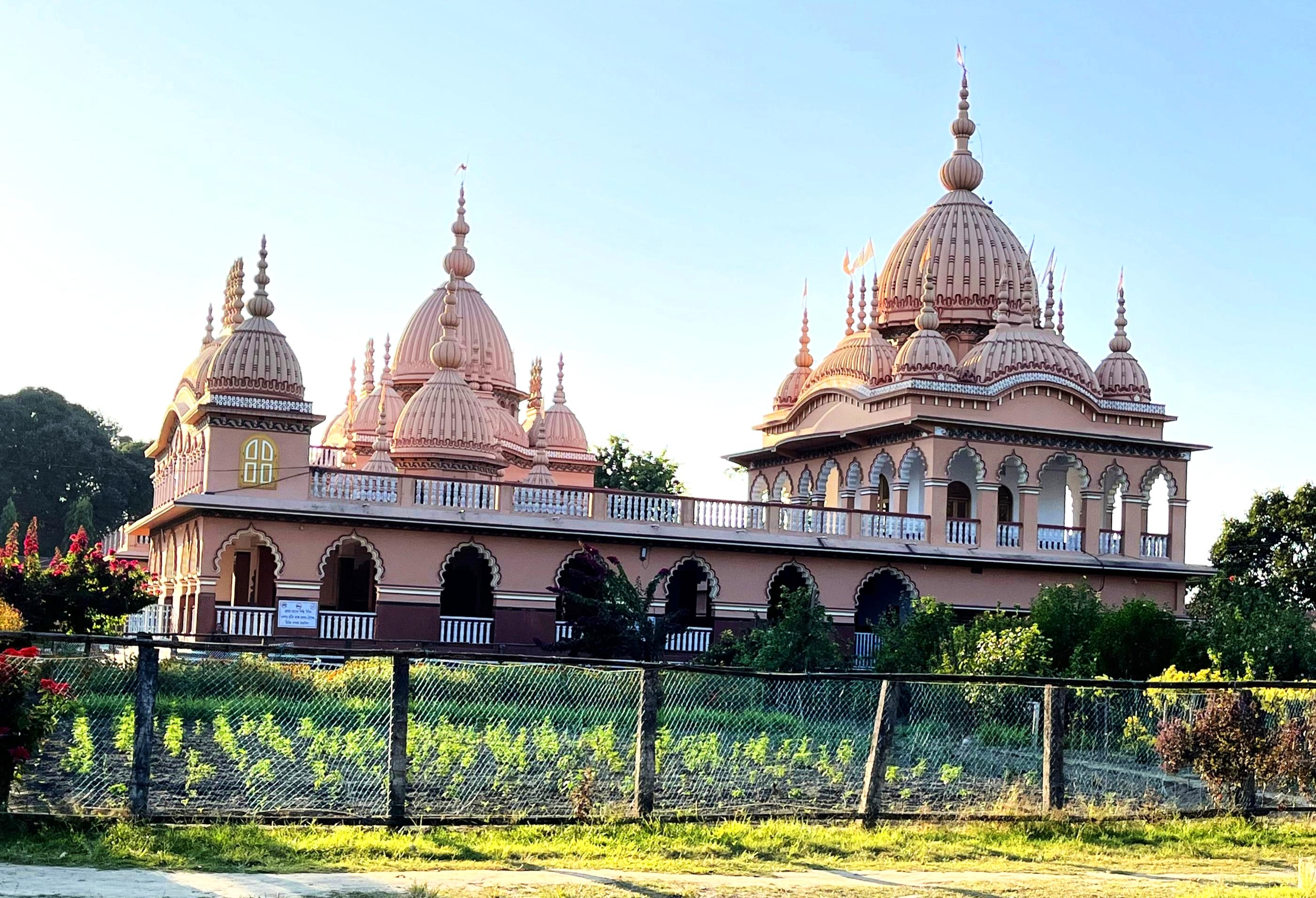
- Shanti Ashram, Kokilamukh (Jorhat), Assam,

- Location in Jorhat Shanti Ashram (India)

Religion
- Affiliation: Hinduism
- District: Jorhat
- Deity: Nigamananda
- Festivals: Barshika Utshova, Sammilani & Akshaya Tritiya
- Governing body: Mahanta Maharaj Dibayananda Saraswati

Location
- Location: Kokilamukh, Jorhat, Assam
- State: Assam
- Country: India
- Interactive map of Shanti Ashram
- Coordinates: 26.830650°N 94.178800°E

Architecture
- Creator: Nigamananda
- Completed: 1912
- Temple: Three

Website
- absmath.org

Shanti Ashram (Assamese: শান্তি আশ্ৰম) (Hindi: शांति आश्रम), now known as "Saraswata Matha" or "Assam Bongiya Saraswata Matha" founded by Swami Nigamananda on the occasion of Akshay Tritiya at Kokilamukh on 5th Baisakh 1319 B.S. The main objective of "Shanti Ashram" (शांति आश्रम) to fulfill his three missions, to propagate Sanatana Dharma (spreading eternal religion), spreading true education and serve everybody as god incarnate.

== History ==
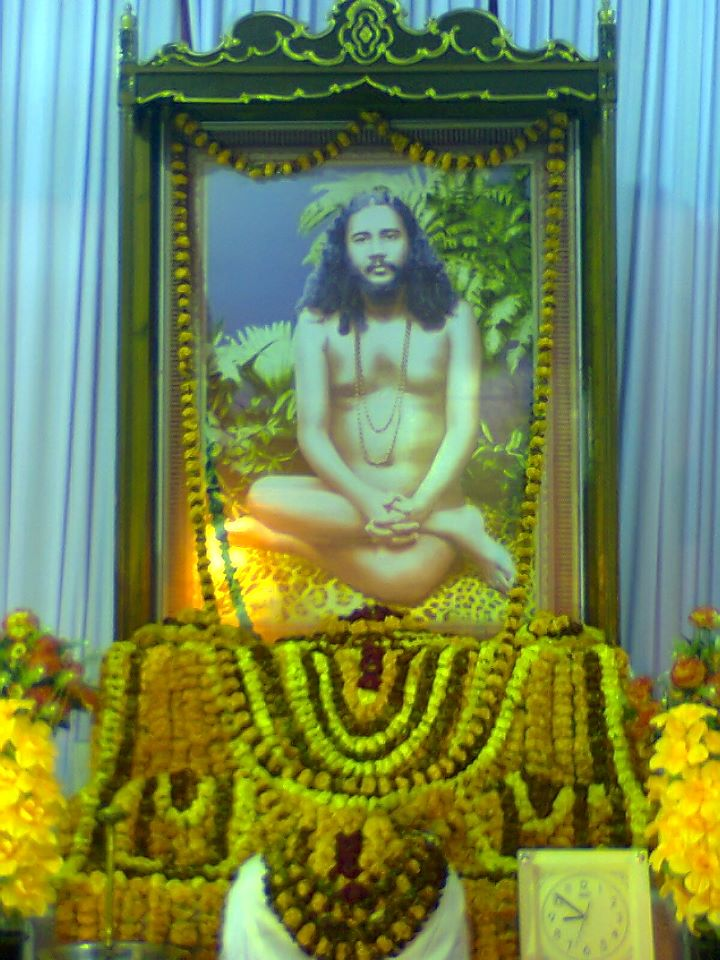
Swami Nigamananda, Founder of : Shanti Ashram

Shanti Ashram was founded for the first time by Nigamananda on Akshay Tritiya at Kumilla Durgapur in 1314 B.S. The ashram was shifted to Gendaria in Dhaka in 1318 B.S. Sri Gouranga Anath Niketan was founded there on the 26th Agrahayana 1318 B.S. The purpose behind it is to serve the distressed, the grieved, the sick and the poor. There was a disciple of named "Saruram Kalita" purchased a plot of 80 bighas at "Kumarveti Chapri village" of "Kokilamukh", in Jorhat district after taking money from Nigamananda. The Math was instituted on the land. Nigamananda himself founded the "asan" (seat) of Brahama at "Kokilamukh" near Jorhat on the occasion of Akshay Tritiya on 7th Baisakh 1319 B.S. and named it Shanti Ashram. Seven self-denying swami disciples (Chidananda, Premananda, Swarupananda, Yogananda, Suddhananda, Bodhananda and Saradananda) were initiated in asceticism by Nigamananda. He named this ashram as "Saraswat Math". It has been called "Assam Bangiya Saraswat Math" since 1325 B.S. Being an ascetic relating to the title of "Saraswati" (tradition name) under the Sringeri Math Nigamananda gives the name to his Math as "Saraswata Matha".

== Location ==
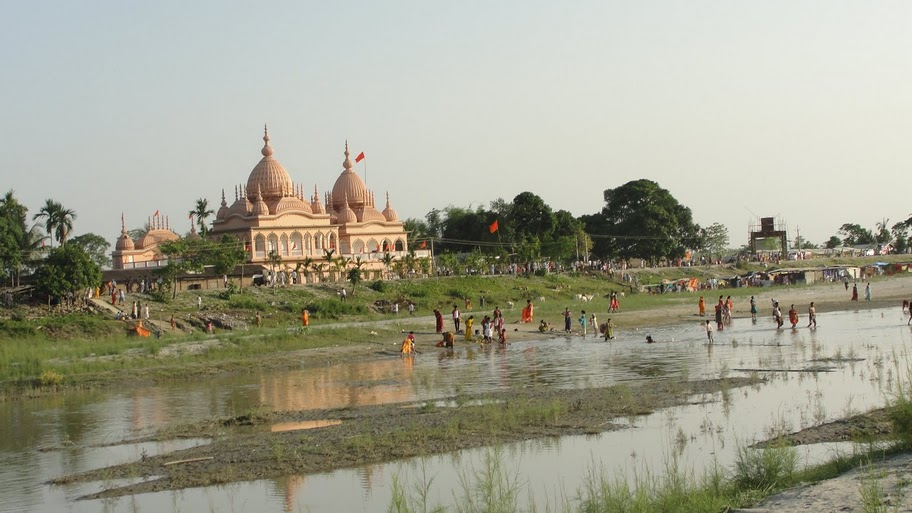
Shanti Ashram, on the banks of the river Brahmaputra

Shanti Ashram or Saraswat Math was sheltered in the lap of a formidable, meadow situated within six miles of Jorhat . On one side of Math, there was a tribal village and the three sides were covered with jungle growth. Mariyani-Jorhat, light rail-ways, passed through the tribal village up to "Kokilamukh". The Himalaya mountain ranges are situated on the north of this place, "Udayagiri" (name of mountain) on the East and Naga hills on the South.

== Glory ==
It is believed that the divine forces of Guru which turned the Ashram a center of spiritual activities and counted as a pilgrimage place of India now. This Math completed its hundredth anniversary on Akshaya Tritiya Baishakh, 2011 (1418 BS), i.e. on 6 May 2011. Nigamananda said, this matha is very dear to my heart, I can sacrifice my life hundred times for the sake of this matha. Works of Saraswata Granthavali(सारस्वत ग्रंथावली) (These are Brahmacharya Sadhan (ब्रह्मचर्य साधन), Yogiguru (योगिगुरु), Tantrikguru (तांत्रिकगुरु), Jnaniguru (ज्ञानीगुरु), and Premikguru (प्रेमिकगुरु)) edited by Nigamananda were published in "Saraswata Math" press. A religious monthly called "Aryadarpan"(आर्य दर्पण) continued to print here. Nigamananda's ashram at Halisahar, Saraswata Matha (previously Shanti Ashram) in Jorhat and Sundarbans are places of pilgrimage.

== See also ==
- Nigamananda Paramahansa
- Kutabpur
- Nilachala Saraswata Sangha
