= Nigamananda Paramahansa =

Hindu Spiritual Leader Writer Philosopher Tantrik Guru and Yogi

Swami Nigamananda Saraswati
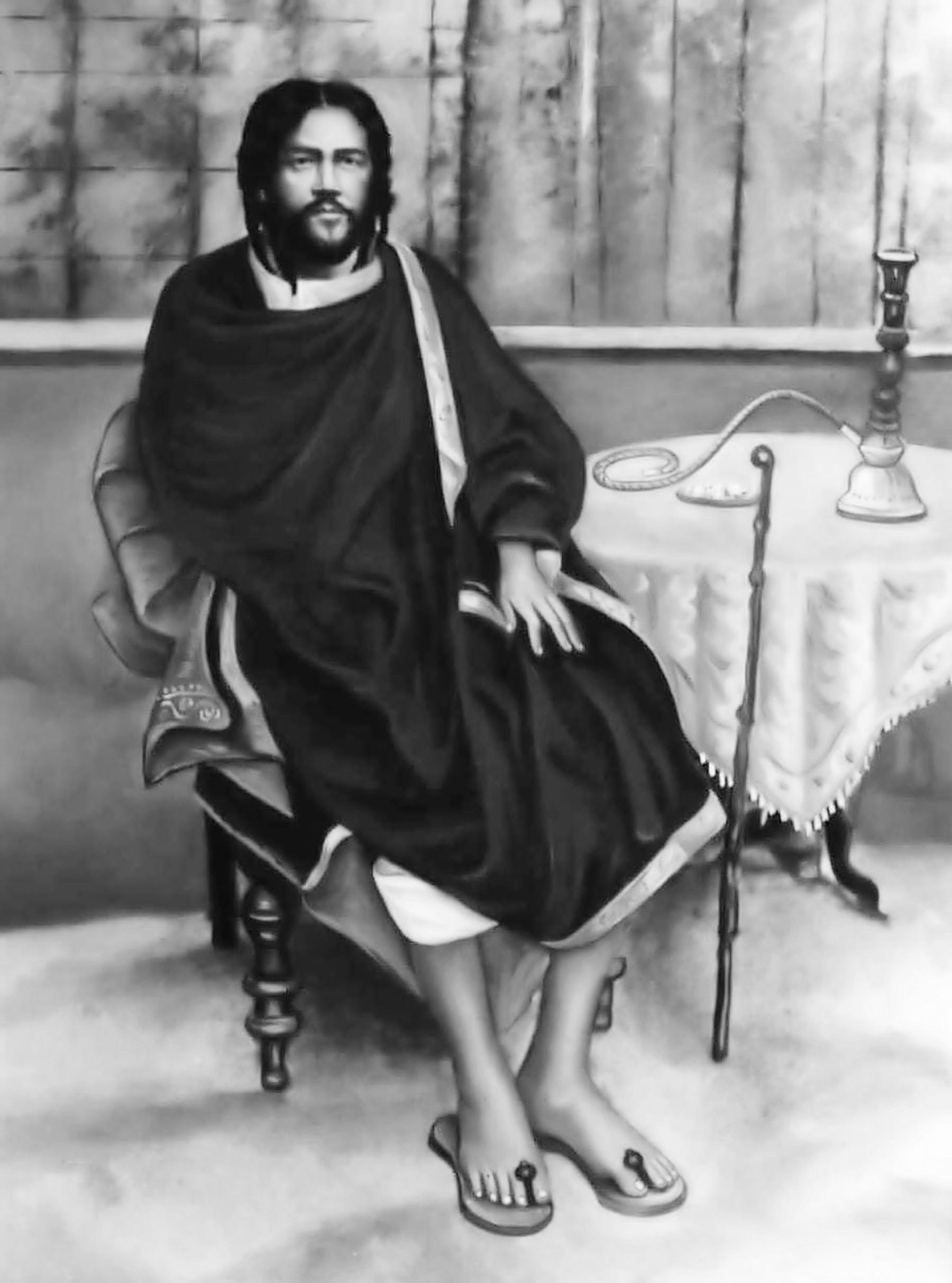
- (Paramahansa Shrimad Swami Nigamananda Saraswati Deva)

Personal life
- Born: Nalinikanta Chattopadhyay; 18 August 1880 Kutabpur, Nadia, Bengal, British India (now in Bangladesh)
- Died: 29 November 1935 (aged 55) Kolkata, Bengal, British India
- Honors: Paramahansa, Sadguru

Religious life
- Religion: Hinduism
- Order: Self-realization
- Philosophy: Advaita Vedanta; Bhakti yoga Tantra
- School: Vedanta

Religious career
- Teacher: Bamakhepa, Sachidananda Saraswati, Sumerudas Ji aka Koot Hoomi, Gouri Maa
- Disciples: Durgaprasanna Paramahansa; Durga Charan Mohanty; Anirvan

Quotation

My dear children! Life in the household is beset with many trials and tribulations. In spite of all these turmoils it has one advantage to provide – it can bring opportunities for realization of God and self

Swami Nigamananda Paramahansa (born Nalinikanta Chattopadhyay; 18 August 1880 – 29 November 1935) was an Indian yogi, guru and mystic in Eastern India. He is associated with the Shakta tradition and a spiritual master of vedanta, tantra, yoga, and prema or bhakti. His followers referred to him as Thakura.

Nigamananda was born into a Bengali Brahmin family in the hamlet of Kutabpur in Nadia district (at present, Meherpur District, Bangladesh). He was a sannyasi from Adi Shankar's dashanami sampradaya. After his ordination as a sannyasi, he came to be known as Paribrajakacharya Paramahansa Srimat Swami Nigamananda Saraswati Deva.

Nigamananda achieved siddhi (perfection) in four different sadhanas (spiritual disciplines): tantra, gyan, yoga, and prema. Based on these experiences, he wrote five Bengali language books: Brahmacarya Sadhana (ब्रह्मचर्य साधन), Yogi Guru (योगिगुरु), Gyani Guru (ज्ञानीगुरु), Tantrika Guru (तांत्रिकगुरु), and Premik Guru (प्रेमिकगुरु). Nigamananda reportedly experienced the state of Nirvikalpa Samadhi.

In 1912, on the eve of Akshaya Tritaya, an event took place with the laying of the foundation of Shanti Ashram at Kokilamukh, Assam. Within the ashram, Thakur himself founded the space known as the Gurubrhama Gaadi, which served as a focal point for devotees. Adherents from any religious tradition could come together to engage in their spiritual practices.

As an ascetic affiliated with the title of Saraswati under the Sringeri Math, Thakur named his ashram as "Saraswat Math". This nomenclature supported his spiritual lineage and also conveyed his reverence for the goddess Saraswati.

After retiring from Saraswata Math, Nigamananda spent the last fourteen years of his life in Puri. Durga Charan Mohanty, a school student, met him at Nilachala Kutir in 1930 and recognized him as Sadguru.

== Life ==
=== Childhood, studies and service life (1880–1901) ===
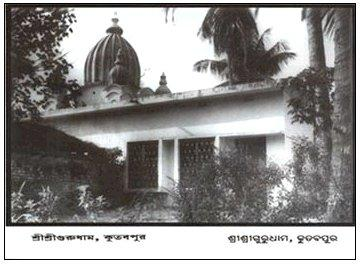
कुतबपुर-Kutabpur(Gurudham), the birthplace of Swami Nigamananda in dist. Nadia

At his birth, Nigamananda was named Nalinikanta (নলিনীকান্ত, ନଳିନୀକାନ୍ତ, नलिनीकान्त - in Hindu meaning is: Lotus, water), per the wishes of his father, Bhuban Mohan and the advice of his father's guru, Swami Bhaskarananda Saraswati. At the age of thirteen (1893), Nalinikanta lost his mother, Manikya Sundari Devi to cholera, pushing him into depression. In 1894–95, he passed the student scholarship examination and studied at Meherpur High School.

In 1895, he entered Dhaka Asanulla Engineering College. In 1897, his father married him to a thirteen-year-old girl named Sudhansubala Devi of Halisahar. He completed his study in 1899, and joined a service in the District Board of Dinajpur, the estate of Rani Rashmoni. At the end of Vadra, 1901 (approximately five years after marriage), when he was serving as the supervisor of the Narayanpur Estate (Zamindari), Nalinikanta saw the shadowy image of his wife standing at the table glowering and silent while she was away at Kutabpur (Nalinikanta's village). He went to Kutabpur to inquire and learned that she had died just an hour before his vision. He unsuccessfully attempted to reach his wife through occult science. His maternal grandfather was Bankim Chandra Chattopadhyay.

=== Turning point ===
Until he lost his wife, Nalinikanta had seen death as the end, but losing her led him to believe that there must be life after death. Nalinikanta became obsessed with this question. His inquiry took him to Madras (now Chennai) to study theosophy at the Theosophical Society at Adyar. Through a medium, he was able to talk to his wife, but remained unsatisfied. His discussions at the society led him to search for a yogi who could fulfill his desire to meet his dead wife and educate him in the true philosophy of "life after death".

=== Spiritual experience (1902–1905) ===
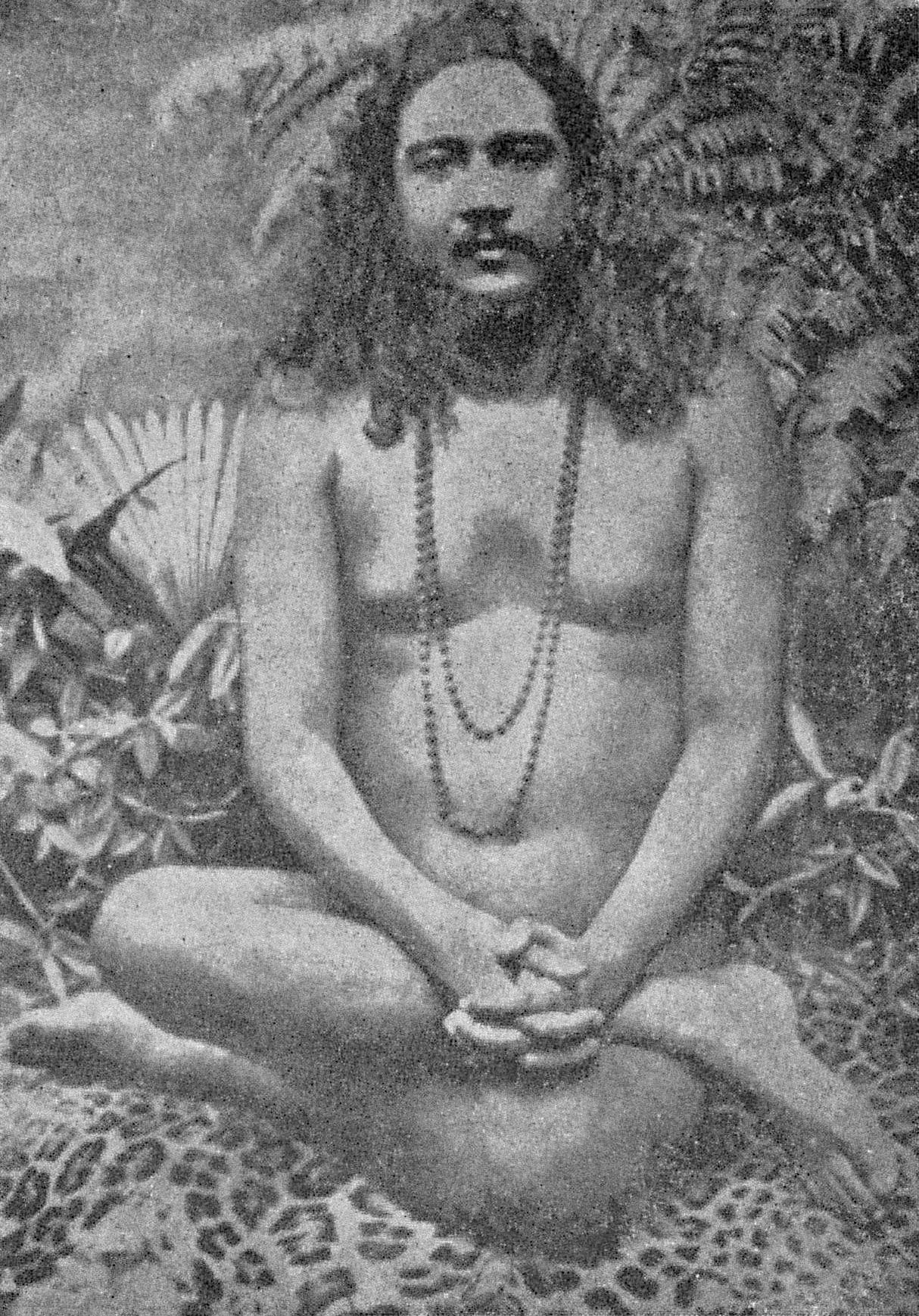
"Nalinikanta" took to asceticism and was named after Nigamananda in 1904 (on the 11th Vadra in 1309 BS)

I had ramble like a mad chap caring little for bodily comforts for god and guru(master). God never descended for a moment to assist me. The day I traced my guru and received His blessings, things turned in my favour. Prior to that although I had undertaken various practices they did not yield any result. As soon as I come under the guidance of my gurudev(master) whatever practices I followed, I got success in each of them. It is therefore very importance that a blessing of guru is very essential for success in spiritual sadhana - SWAMI NIGAMANANDA

One night, Nalinikanta dreamed of a sadhu with an aura. He woke up to find the sadhu standing beside his bed. The sadhu handed him a bael leaf with a mantra written on it and then vanished. Nalinikanta asked many to help him understand its meaning. Finally, he met Bamakhepa, a tantrik of Tarapith, Birbhum district. Nalinikanta took initiation (dikhshya) from him and was directed to chant his mantra for 21 days. Under Bamakhepa's guidance, he had physical darshan of Tara Devi in the form of his wife. This darshan led him to another mystery. He saw Tara Devi coming out of his body and mingling with him. To solve this mystery, Bamakshepa advised Nalinikanta to attain the knowledge of Advaita from a vedantic guru. In 1902, he searched for a jnani guru. He met guru Satchidananda Saraswati at the holy place of Pushkar in the Indian state of Rajasthan. He realized that Satchidananda Saraswati was the sadhu who had given him the Tara mantra in his dream. Nalinikanta became his disciple, and learned the theories of Brahman (god as the formless one), Brahma sutras and vedanta. He was initiated by the Satchidananda into renunciation, and according to that principle changed his name to Nigamananda.

Satchidananda directed Nigamananda to undertake pilgrimages to the four institutions (Char Dham) of religious seats and to realize the significance of each, as the Hindus held these places of worship sacred. After these pilgrimages, he returned to the ashram.

On his arrival at the ashram, Sachidananda reviewed Nigamananda's pilgrimages and stated: "My boy, you have travelled widely and seen the religious places and acquired knowledge and experience. All that I had to teach you has been accomplished but it is for you now to put my teachings into practice. You have to experience for yourself the truth of your being and this can only be done through concerted efforts as well as the practice and observance of yogic principles. Thus, you now have to seek out a guru who will provide you with proper guidance in this line".

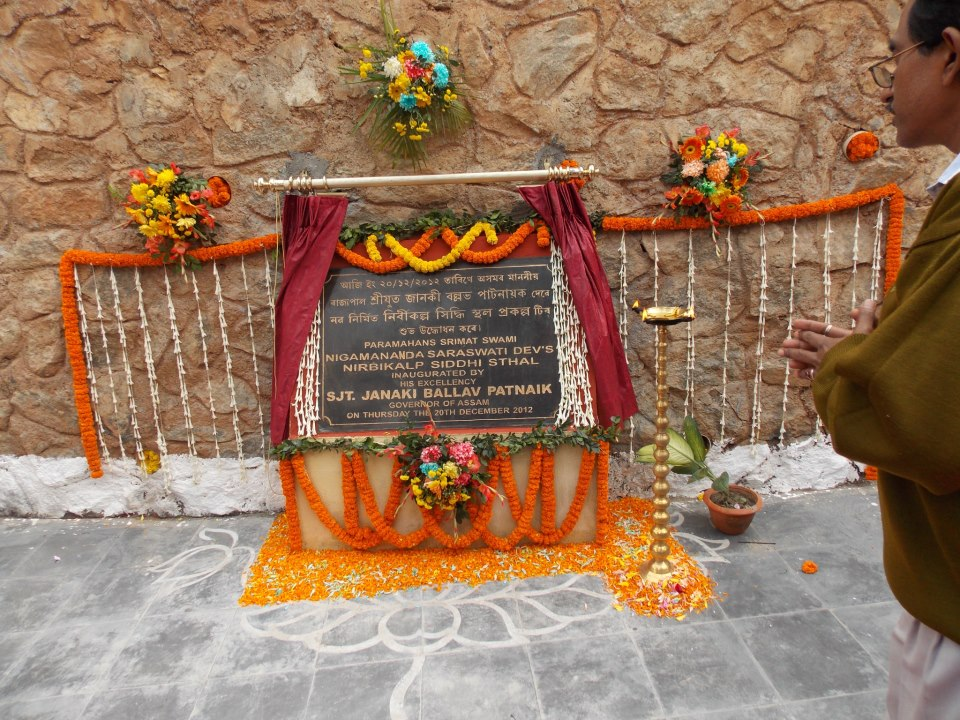
Gauhati(Assam)-Kamakhya Hill: This is the place, where Nigamananda experienced Nirivikalpa Samadhi (निर्बिकल्प समाधि) and the place is identified by the government of Assam in 2012.

Nigamananda then went out to seek a guru. In 1903, he met a "yogi guru" (yoga master), whom he called "Sumeru Dasji" (otherwise known as Koot Hoomi Lal Singh or Kuthumi). Nigamananda was accepted as his disciple. Under Das's guidance, he learned yoga. After hard practice, in the month of Poush in 1904, Nigamananda was able to master Savikalpa samadhi (the trance in which the yogi loses his body consciousness and acquires a transcendental consciousness while retaining his individual identity). Soon after Nigamananda desired to experience the state of Nirvikalpa, an advanced yogic samadhis at Kamakshya, Guwahati Assam (Nilachal Hill). Nigamananda followers believe that he did enter by way of this samadhi and returned into his body with the residual consciousness of "I am the master or guru", and in yoga he had visualized and understood in his own body, his guru's vedic knowledge.

(The place where the "Nirvikalpa samadhi" was experienced by Swami Nigamananda has been identified. Assam Governor Janaki Ballav Patnaik inaugurated the Nirbikalpa Sidhi Sthal of Swami Nigamananda at Nilachal Hills in Kamakhya Dham, Guwahati on 20 December 2012.)

In 1904, he was in Kashi (now known as Varanasi), when Goddess Annapurna appeared in a dream and stated that his knowledge was limited to formless god and not gone beyond that, hence he was still incomplete. He accepted her challenge and traveled to Gouri devi (a Siddha Yogini) to learn Bhava Sadhana. Gouri devi accepted him as a disciple and taught him bhakti or prem (eternal nature of divine love play) to understand the physical world as the transformation of god in bhava sadhana.

Nigamananda's long and continued search for his guru, resembled the search undertaken by his future disciples to find him.

=== Recognition as paramahamsa (1904) ===
In 1904, Nigamananda went to Allahabad to see kumbha mela and learned that his master Sachidandand was in the area, staying with Shankaracharya of Sringeri Matha. He found Shankaracharya (Mahant or superior) sitting on a throne surrounded by 125 monks, including his guru. Seeing him, Nigamananda went to pay his respects to his guru, and then to the higher-ranking mahant. The sadhu was upset by this perceived disrespect in not honoring the "mahant" first, but in response, Nigamananda quoted the scripture: "Mannatha shri jagannatha madguru shri jagadguru madatma sarvabhutatma tasmai shri gurave namaha, meaning, "My guru is highest in whole world, hence I should respect my guru first". Nigamananda further explained to the sadhu assemblies that "on the basis of the vedanta philosophy there was no difference between his 'Guru' (Shri Sachidanand Saraswati) and 'Jagadguru' (Shri Shankarcharya)".

Jagadguru Shankaracharya endorsed this response and recognized Nigamananda as one who had achieved spiritual enlightenment. Jagadguru conferred him with the title "Paramahamsa" and was known as "Paribrajakacharay Paramahansa Shree Mad Swami Nigamananda Saraswati Deva".

=== Maha Samadhi (1935) ===
Nigamananda spent the last fourteen years of his life in Puri. He taken Maha Samadhi in Calcutta on 29 November 1935. In memory of Nigamananda, his followers gather at annual congregations (sammilani), and other ceremonial occasions.

His ashram at Halisahar, Saraswata Matha (previously Shanti Ashram) in Jorhat and Sundarbans are places of pilgrimage.

== Mission ==
Nigamananda's mission was to propagate sanatana dharma, the spiritual foundation of the Hindu religion, to spread the "right kind of education" among people, to publish spiritual literature with emphasis on character building and to provide "service to all created beings", with the attitude of serving the indwelling God.

In order to realize these objectives he enjoined his devotees to "lead an ideal family life", to combine the power of spiritual associations and "to share or exchange spiritual feelings among the disciples".

== Jaiguru ==
To achieve the above objectives, he initiated thousands of interested men and women of all walks of life and taught them his spiritual practices. They were devoid of sectarian bias in that they did not provide a complete package of worship, prayer and meditation. He encouraged his disciples to meet periodically in groups (sangha) of three or more to offer prayer and worship to the guru, to exchange spiritual experiences and to chant "jaiguru", a non-sectarian word he invented, meaning "Glory of, by, and for the Master".

He instructed them to read spiritual books and devise ways and means for managing matha and ashrams and pledging to lead the life of a spiritually inspired ideal householder. He advised his disciples that the glory of God or Guru is experienced through the medium of the word "Jaiguru". One can reach at God through this name, since God is the Guru or Master of the Universe. People belonging to any sect or creed can accept this name without any risk to their progress in the religious life.

== Philosophy and teachings ==
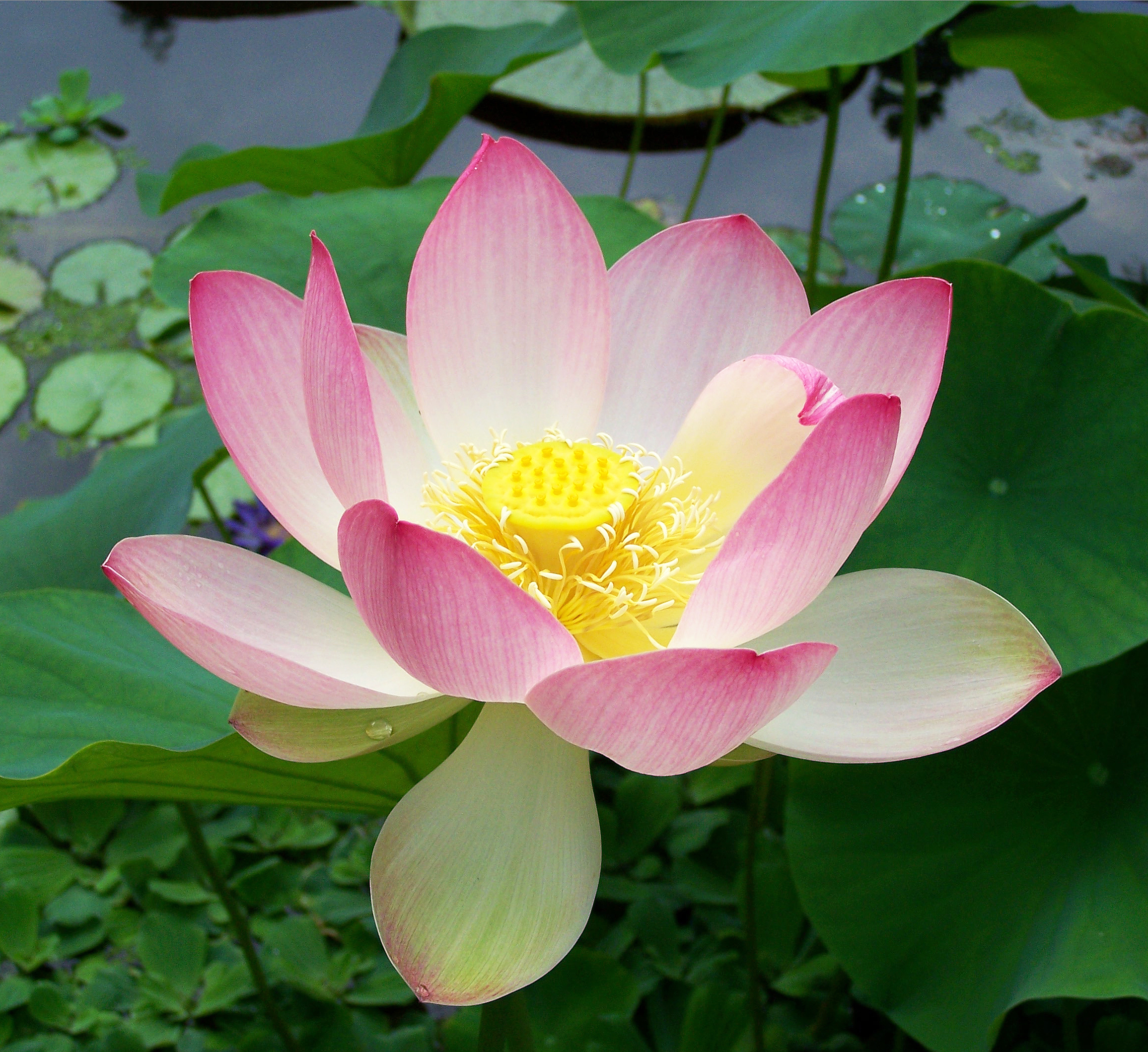
Krishna had told Arjuna about the relationship between Guru and God during the course of His teaching. He had used the word "AHAM" when He meant Himself as Guru and "TAT" when He meant God. He mentioned God in the following verses: tat-prasadat param santim sthanam prapsyasi sasvatam (Bhagvad Gita 18.62).

Nigamananda was a sanyasi of the Adi Shankara order. He studied vedanta philosophy due to Shankaracharya after he was initiated as a sanyasi of that order.

Nigamananda's teachings were that guru and istha are identical and that disciples should adopt ideals of Lord Shankar (i.e. the principles of gyan) and ideals of Lord Gaurang (i.e. the path of bhakti). He indicated that Shankar's disciplines were difficult and that Lord Gaurang offered an easier path. According to Nigamananda, Shankar and Gaurang provide a combination of Gyan and Bhakti to lead the world in the right way.

Nigamananda's philosophy and teachings as per Chetanananda Saraswati are explained here:

=== Avatar and Sadguru ===
Nigamananda never admitted that he was God-incarnate or an Avatar (अवतार) although many disciples fancied him as one. He stated that an incarnation is a descent of God on earth to uphold spiritual order. Although he could, the Avatar does not enlighten or guide individuals. Nigamananda wanted to be treated as a Sadguru (a perfect spiritual Master) who, on account of his quest over a succession of births and deaths, attained the knowledge of his Swaroop स्वरुप (true or potential nature, i.e., supreme universal consciousness). Scriptural evidence shows that Gautam himself had to pass through many births before realising the truth and becoming the Buddha. Nigamananda further pointed out that an Avatar does not remain in the state allowing leela (divine play.)

=== Sadguru, Jagadguru and God ===
According to Nigamananda the disciple should take his Guru to be the Jagadguru (or the World Master, the Purushottama) and not an ordinary human being, in tune with Krishna's statement in the Bhagavad Gita:

He who truly knows My birth and activities to be divine is not born again but attains to Me – Bhagavadgeeta (4.9).

Patanjali's aphorism expands this idea: "By contemplating on the form of one who has no attachments, concentration of mind is attained", Nigamananda advised his disciples to meditate on his physical form such that all the admirable qualities and attributes in him would get automatically transferred into their beings and fashion their souls. Further he assured that because he had, by employing three modes of spiritual practice, simultaneously experienced the nature of Brahman, Paramatma (supreme universal self) and Bhagawan (personal and universal Godhead.) He proclaimed that his disciples would simultaneously have such an experience. That, he said, "was his only expectation from his disciples and he would love to wait for the day to see that fulfilled".

=== Order of spiritual attainments ===
According to Nigamananda, the theory of self-realization requires expanding the individual self to the status of the universal self. The expansions can be practiced only by the competent among the aspirant sanyasis by means of intellectual inquiry, analysis and meditation, although service to the Master is the key to success in such pursuits as well. However, Nigamananda pointed out that transcendental divine love and ecstasy could be experienced by the fortunate ones only after they had attained monistic realization of the supreme as declared by Lord Krishna himself in the Bhagavad Gita:

Having realized the state of oneness with the supreme self or Parabrahman and attaining tranquility in spirit, the aspirant neither grieves nor desires and regarding all beings as alike he attains supreme devotion to Me - Bhagavadgeeta (18.54).

=== Reconciliation of monistic and dualistic pursuits ===
Unlike saints who recognized and preached a diversity of doctrines for self / God realisation and offered multiple paths to attain them, Nigamananda suggested the realisation of the oneness of self and the supreme universal self (or Parabrahman-परंब्रह्म) as the true and the highest goal of human life.

For most aspirants, the path is one of devotion to the spiritual master (Sadguru) who initiates them. Rendering personal service to the Master and invoking his grace through prayers, chanting and simple meditation are the modes of spiritual practice for them. They will acquire non-dualistic realization that their Master is a realized soul (Brahmajnani-ब्रह्मज्ञानी) and experience bliss due to intense love for him over the course of time, when they are enabled to participate in his Leela (love play-लिला) for helping others.

Nigamananda pointed out that the path shown by Gauranga, who practiced and preached unconditional devotion and love for God, was rather narrow, inasmuch as it was directed to Sri Krishna as the only God. In order to broaden that path, Nigamananda suggested taking the master as an embodiment of Sri Krishna (or any other deity whom the aspirant loved), in which case the guide himself becomes the goal.

In this way, Nigamananda reconciled the two contradictory creeds of Shankaracharya and Gauranga who advocated the principle and practice of apparent duality between the devotee and God. Nigamananda pointed out that in the path of devotion and love the aspirant has to subdue or tame his ego and hence he attains to the same stage as that of the monastic aspirant whose ego loses its identity on attaining to his goal. In the former case, the devotee's individuality is reduced to a trifle, overpowered by personal god-consciousness, whereas in the latter the aspirant loses his self-consciousness in the ocean of impersonal universal consciousness.

Jnanachakra

Nigamananda pointed out that although the doctrine of monastic vedanta philosophy treats the supreme reality in terms of oneness of individual and universal consciousness, it does not explain the structure of the material creation that is addressed by Samkhya philosophy.

This latter does not treat the supreme reality as well. Similarly, whereas Christianity emphasizes service and surrender as means to God realization, the Indian philosophy of Poorva Mimamsa prescribes various rituals for the attainment of personal and collective happiness despite cycles of birth and death.

By means of a Jnanachakra chart (the spheres of spiritual cosmology) which he presented in a pictorial form, Nigamananda identified different layers of consciousness inter-woven in the microcosm (body) and the macrocosm (the universe) and pointed out the levels that aspirants ultimately attain. In this chart he placed Sri Krishna and Sri Radha (or the Guru and Yogamaya) in the transition between the non qualified (Nirguna) Brahman and qualified (Saguna) Brahman (सगुण ब्रह्म), which he called Nitya or Bhavaloka. (Yogamaya is a form of divine power, which incessantly attracts earth-bound souls and helps them realise their true blissful nature and participate in divine play).

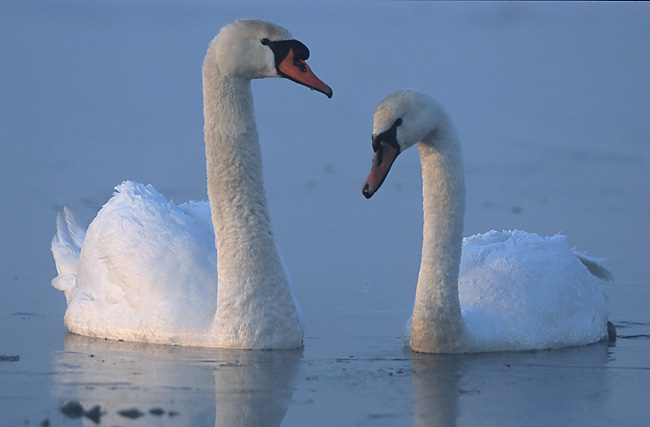
A Paramahamsa can be accepted as a perfect man and is to be considered as the God-man. At this he remains in "Chinmaya" form i.e. eternal body and becomes the fountain of love (Prem).

=== Other key teachings ===
Other key teachings of Nigamananda as stated by Chetnananda Saraswati are:

- Spiritual liberation requires the help of a liberated person (a Master Sadguru or simply Guru). In the Hindu scriptures that person is known as Guru. Without his grace or favor none can make progress. He who has attained the ultimate reality (Paramatman or Brahman) as one and the same as himself (the Atman) is the Guru.
- The Guru cannot be equated in importance to formal learning, pilgrimage or divinity. No other is more worthy of respect.
- The Guru is the embodiment of what the Vedanta teaches – the individual self (the Atman) is one and the same as the cosmic self (Paramatman or Brahman).
- A Sadguru never curses anyone. Even his anger helps the disciple. The advantage of depending on a Sadguru is unique and is superior to depending on God because God never materializes to give instructions.
- The Guru and the disciple are inseparable in a way. The Guru cannot exist without being a part of a true disciple's personality or character.
- The two pathways to liberation are by initiation into and observation of the austerities of sannyasa yoga or by service to a Sadguru. The former is extremely arduous – the disciple must in a sense die. In other words, he must lose body consciousness. But if one unconditionally loves the Guru by way of rendering service to him sincerely, spiritual liberation may be obtained relatively easily.
- Nothing substantial can be achieved without Guru's grace.
- The mantra that Guru gives during initiation and the disciple's chosen divinity (or Ista) are the same. Unless the Guru becomes the chosen divinity, the mantra received loses its power.
- Acquisition of disciples is not Guru's profession; it is his heart's inspiration. The Guru cares for and guides the disciple hoping that one day the disciple will get spiritually enlightened.

== Yoga, theories and techniques ==
The following theories are collected from the Oriya book Shri Shri Thakur Nigamananda (श्री श्री ठाकुर निगमानंद) and the writer, Durga Charan Mohanty-Banamali Dash:

=== Theory of jibanamukta upasana ===
One of Nigamananda's major precepts was the theory of Jibanamukta Upasana, which he believed could lead the sadhaka to quick self-realization.

=== Karmic theory ===
According to Nigamananda, karma is of three kinds viz. kriyaman, sanchita and prarbdha. Enjoying the results of one's labour while alive is kriyaman; death before enjoyment produces sanchita karma or accumulated labour. Enjoying accumulated karma after rebirth is prarbdha. By virtue of sadhana, the effects of kriyaman and sanchita can be wiped out during a life but it is not possible to erase prarbdha. A person possessed with worldly ambitions is sure to continue the endless journey of birth and death. Jivatma leaves the gross body to travel in the spirit world or pret lok (ghost world). After undergoing karmic effects, it returns to the physical world with a body for the fulfillment of desires from its prior incarnation. How it moves from one world to another is a mystery. Yogis can perceive the mystery and tell the past sanskar of jiva.

=== On death ===
Nigamananda said that one should remember that death is coming. Before working on good or evil deeds one should also remember that death is not far off. Contemplating death drives away the desire for sensual pleasure and evil thoughts and stops acts of injustice. Attachment to wealth and relations will then diminish. Earthly matters remain even after departure from this world. Only spiritual wealth remains as an asset to the individual. Those who have puffed with pride on account of their accomplishments will submit to the God of death when that hour comes. Drunk with pride, some persons ill-treat their brethren. They will be left in the deserted crematory ground with the beasts and birds waiting to feast upon their flesh. Thinking of this will drive evil thoughts from the mind.

=== Yoga ===
Nigamananda wrote a great deal on yoga. His theories and techniques can be found in his book "Yogi Guru". Samples:

==== Hatha yoga and Laya yoga ====
Hatha yoga can be carried out when the body is made fit for the purpose. The body should be cleansed first of impurities through sat sadhna, the six elementary practices of yoga. Hatha yoga is completely different from laya yoga. Hatha yoga can make the body strong, enabling it to survive for four hundred years or more, whereas laya yoga helps the aspirant to attain union with the supreme. If the body is not kept purified both externally and internally with hatha yoga, attempting laya yoga would yield no result.

==== Dharana and dhyan ====
Nigamananda taught that the breathing system is connected with the intricate workings of the mind. Therefore, practice of pranayama leads to calmer breathing and thereby maintains tranquility of mind. Mind is subjected to forces of disturbed thoughts owing to irregular breathing. He said "I had applied myself to the higher practices of yoga, thereafter, i.e. dharana and dhyan (meditation)". The sadhaka is likely to peril his life if he does not take assistance of another during these advanced practices. During Dhāraṇā, the sadhaka experiences his own progress and when the estimated height in sadhana is achieved, he enters into successive steps of progress. While being absorbed in the practice of dhyan, the sadhaka may cross over to the state of samadhi. When he achieves this state of consciousness is not predictable. Until samadhi, the sadhaka gropes in the darkness aided by Guru.

==== Sampragyant samadhi ====
Nigamananda pointed out that if earlier practices are perfected, the succeeding steps yield lasting results. The sadhaka enters samadhi as a matter of his own experience, including the awakening of kundalini. The upward and downward motion of kundalini is called Sampragyant Samadhi (सम्प्रज्ञात समाधि).

== Works ==
=== Institutions founded ===
==== Garohill Yoga Ashram ====
Nigamananda founded his first Yoga Ashram in 1905 (1312 BS) at Kodaldhoa in Garo Hills, which is called now "Garohill-Yogashrama". His famous book "Yogi Guru" (योगिगुरु), was written and composed here in 14 days.

==== Saraswata Matha ====
Nigamananda founded Shanti Ashram in 1912 at Jorhat to fulfill his three missions, to propagate Sanatana Dharma (spreading eternal religion), spreading true education and serve everybody as god incarnate.

He took a plot of land of Jorhat in Sibsagar district and founded this ashram there on Akshaya Tritiya, in the month of Baishakh (in 1319 BS according to Bengal calendar). This was called "Shanti Ashram" or Saraswata Matha (सारस्वत मठ), which went by the name of Assam-Bengal Saraswata Matha in the later years. Rishi Vidyalaya was an important school founded under this matha for yoga training.

===== Retirement =====
Nigamananda initiated ten devout disciples into sanyas in the tradition of the "Saraswati" by order due to the great Sankaracharya, the juniormost among whom was "Swami Nirvanananda Saraswati" (an erudite scholar, philosopher and writer who became famous as Anirvan later on) and "Swami Prajnananda Saraswati". Swearing in Swami Prajnanandaji as the mahant and Trustee of the "Saraswat Matha and Ashrama Establishments". Swami Nigamananda retired and resided in Nilachala Kutir in Puri for several years, until 1935.

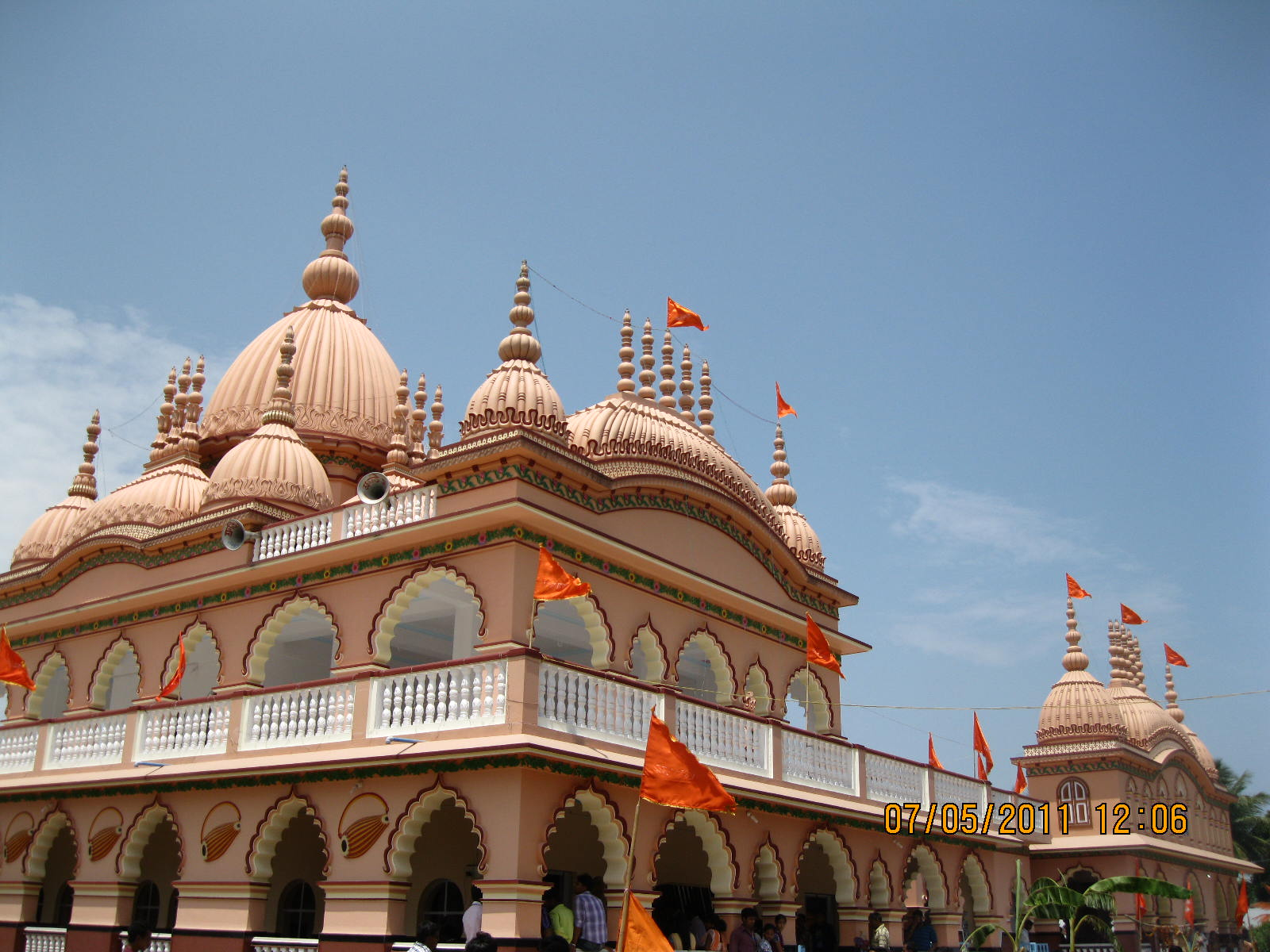
Swami Nigamananda's monastic organization Assam Bangiya Saraswata Matha at Kokilamukh, Jorhat, India completed 100 years in 2011

===== 100 Years of Saraswata Matha (1912–2011) =====
This Institution (Shanti Ashram) or "Saraswata Matha" founded by Swami Nigamananda in 1912 (1319 BS) reached its hundredth anniversary on Akshaya Tritiya Baishakh, 2011 (1418 BS), i.e. 6 May 2011.

Nigamananda said, this matha is very dear to my heart, I can sacrifice my life hundred times for the sake of this matha.

==== Nilachala Saraswata Sangha ====
Nigamananda accepted Jagannatha culture and advised his disciples to worship him according to their state/country's culture. He believed that Lord Jagannath is the "symbol of truth".

The day Sravan Purnima (full moon day), on 24 August 1934 Friday, Nilachala Saraswata Sangha (NSS) was established by Nigamananda at Nilachala Kutir, Puri. The Oriya devotees gathered there to celebrate his birthday. He advised them to form a religious circle. As per his wishes devotees started an association for religious talk and thus Nilachala Saraswata Sangha (the Sangha) came into existence to fulfill his tripartite objective: (1) leading an ideal family life, (2) establishment of combined power and (3) sharing of feelings.

==== Guru Braham Ashrams ====
Nigamananda established Guru Brahama Ashrams where people from any faith can come and pray in their own ways.

He instituted five Ashrams in five divisions of undivided Bengal. They are Purba Bangala Saraswat Ashram at Moinamati, Comilla (Bangala Desh), now at Tripura, Madhya Bangala Saraswat Ashram at Kalni, Dacca, now Purbasthali Bardhaman district, Uttar Bangala Saraswat Ashram at Bogra, Paschima Bangala Saraswat Ashram at Kharkusama, Midnapore, Dakhina Bangala Saraswat Ashram at Halisahar, 24 Paragans.

Nigamananda installed Jagat Gurus Ashan, in 1915 at Kokilamukh, Jorhat, Assam and established many ashrams and made thousands of disciples in the guru-shishya tradition.

==== Other foundations ====
Followers of Nigamananda run Nigamananda Education Centers in Orissa, also schools and educational institutions around India.

=== Publications ===
==== Saraswata Granthavali ====
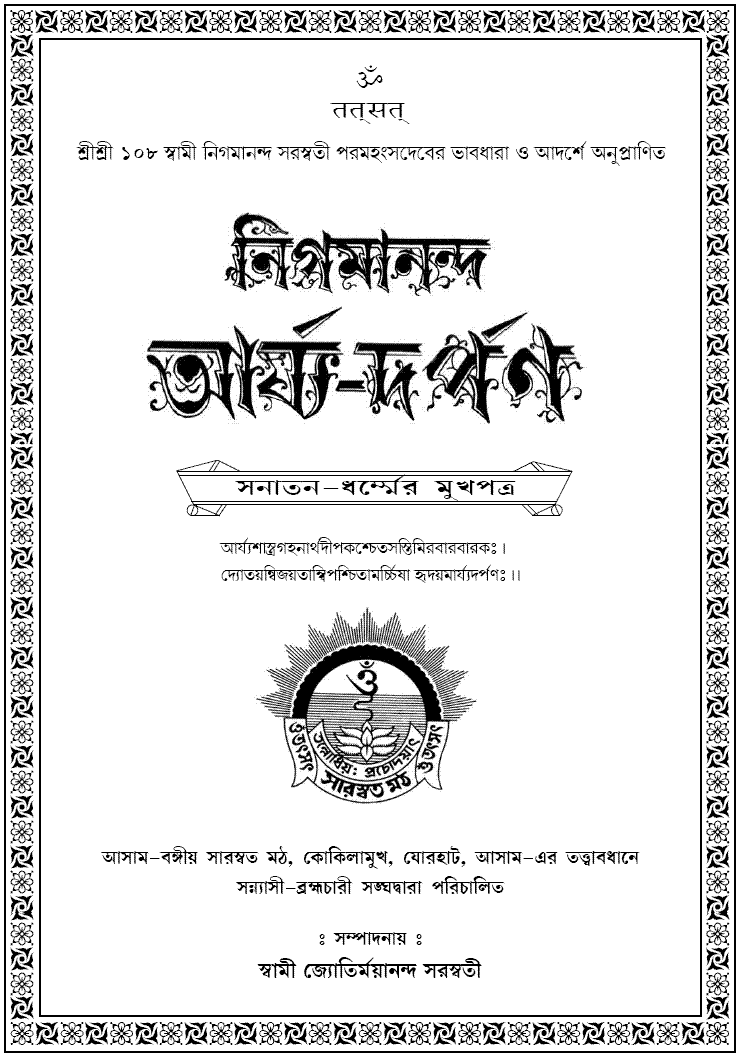
Sanatana Dharma Patrika-Arya Darapan

Nigamananda wrote and published a series of books, known collectively as Saraswata Granthavali (सारस्वत ग्रंथावली). These are Brahmacharya Sadhan (ब्रह्मचर्य साधन), Yogiguru (योगिगुरु), Tantrikguru (तांत्रिकगुरु), Jnaniguru (ज्ञानीगुरु), and Premikguru (प्रेमिकगुरु) which dealt with the fundamentals of almost all modes of sadhana (spiritual practice) prevalent in Sanatan dharma. Nigamanananda's followers believe that these books are useful to any faithful person and if practiced carefully will lead to success in spiritual pursuits. By Mohanty's efforts these books were translated from Bengali to Oriya.

==== Arya Darpan ====
Nigamananda also published Arya Darpan (आर्य दर्पण), a monthly magazine on sanatana dharma, intended for disseminating non-sectarian spiritual knowledge among the masses. Many essays on important topics relating to religious and scriptural matters were included in this magazine.

==== Thakurer Chithi ====
Advising his disciples, Nigamananda wrote letters, from which one hundred are collected in a book called Thakurer Chithi (ठाकुरेर चिठी). This information was published in a Calcutta magazine Modern Review, founded by Ramananda Chatterjee, on 26 December 1938. Other Nigamananda collections are Maayer Kripa (मायेर कृपा), Vedanta Vivek (वेदांत विवेक) and Tattvamala (तत्वमाला).

=== Bhakta Sammilani ===
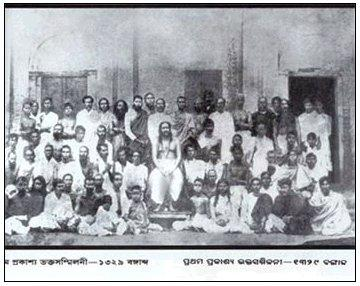
Swami Nigamananda (in middle) along with disciples in Bhakta Sammilani 1922

Nigamananda conducted an annual conference called Bhakta Sammilani for householders and sanyasis. This was formed to strengthen prayer groups, discuss the importance of having a guru, review the well-being of sanyasis living in the ashrams, help solve problems as a whole, provide welfare, such as schools, communities and to hold lectures by enlightened speakers on public spiritual life.

Nigamananda categorized Bhakta Sammilani into "Sarbabhouma" (country wide) and "Pradeshika" (state wide). The first "Sarbabhouma Bhakta Sammilani" was established by him at Kokilamukh in 1915. The first "Pradeshika Bhakta Sammilani" was held in 1947 by Nilachala Saraswata Sangha, Puri at Ankoli in the district of Ganjam during full moon day of maagha.

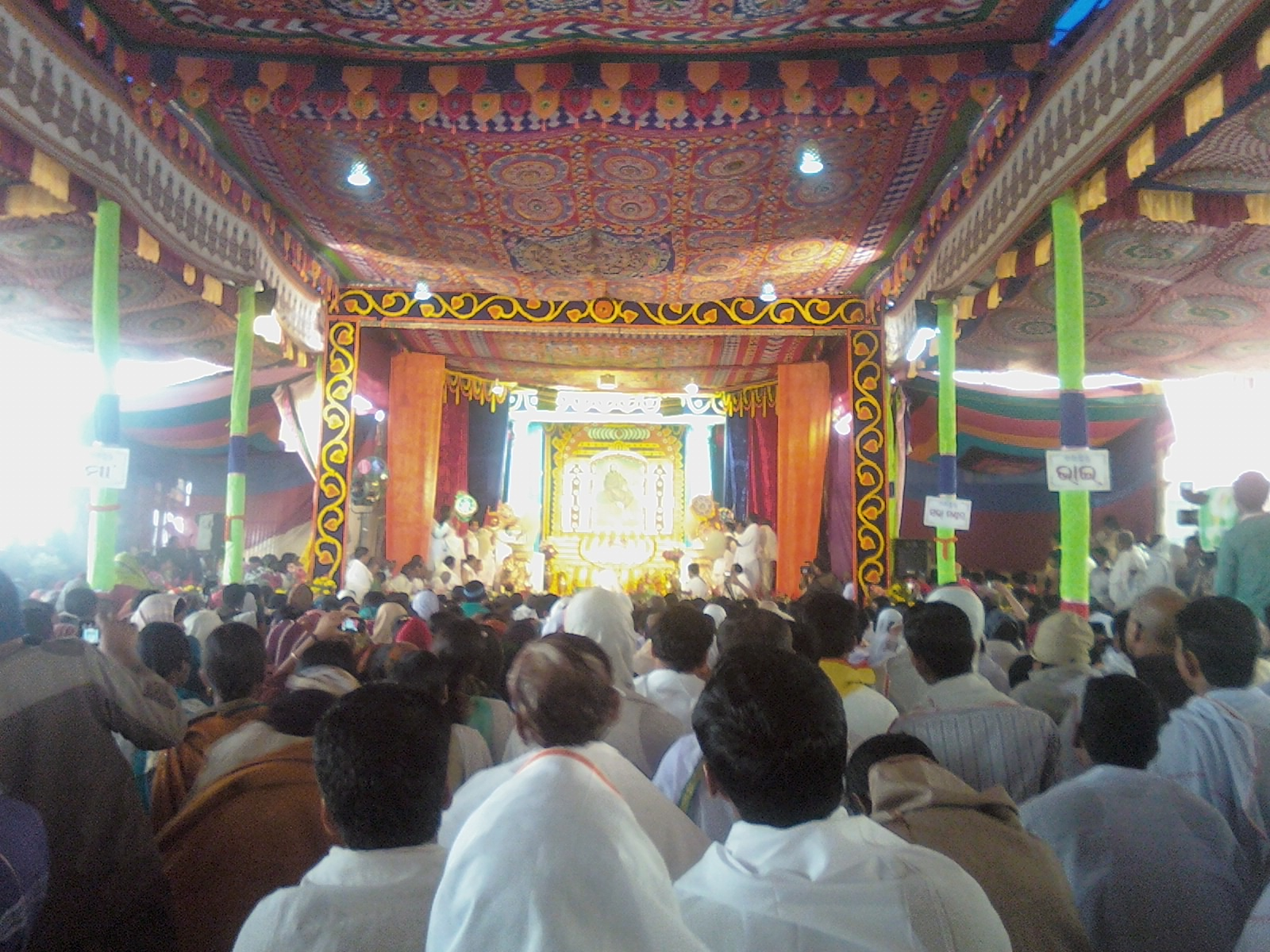
Swami Nigamananda's Utkal Pradeshika Bhakta Sammilani-No.61 (उत्कल प्रादेशिक भक्त सम्मिलनी), held in village Biratunga on 6,7,8 Feb 2012.

Nigamananda set a different prayer day for women disciples where they alone could participate and exchange their views.

He said in one sammilani, "my devotees are fully aware that I am pleased to see them congregated in this sammilani, once in a year during X-mas. Such gathering would bring fame to the maths and it would also do good to the world at large".

== Legacy ==
Mohanty became Nigamananda's disciple and wrote books for Nigamananda's establishment Nilachala Saraswata Sangha and translated Nigamananda's Bengali books into Odia. Under Mohanty's encouragement, more than 100 ashrams operate in Odisha. Mohanty continued to spread the message of Nigamananda until his death on 7 December 1985.

Nigamananda's birthday is celebrated every year on Sravan Purnima day at Nilachala Kutir in Oriya culture. On 10 August 2014 his 134th Birthday was celebrated at Nilachala Kutir. The 63rd Bhakta Sammilani was celebrated in February 2014 at Bhadrak.

== See also ==
- List of Hindu gurus and sants (including yogis)
- Sri Anirvan
- Nigamananda Bidyapitha
- Modern Review
