= Iron silicide =

Iron silicide may refer to the following chemical compounds:

- Diiron silicide, Fe_{2}Si
- Iron monosilicide, FeSi
- Iron disilicide, FeSi_{2}
