= Kutabpur =

Village in West Bengal, India

Kutabpur is a village in Nadia district (West Bengal), situated to the south of the Western bank of the river Bhairab, where the indigo godown was once built. Years back, the English merchants were engaged in the trade of indigo on the banks of the river. The village is inhabited by people of all castes who devote themselves to the worship of deities, Mitra and Mansa.

Religious personality Swami Nigamananda was born in this village. He showed the world the path of Gyana(ज्ञान)-Shankara and Prema( प्रेम) -Gouranga.
