= Praseodymium hexaboride =

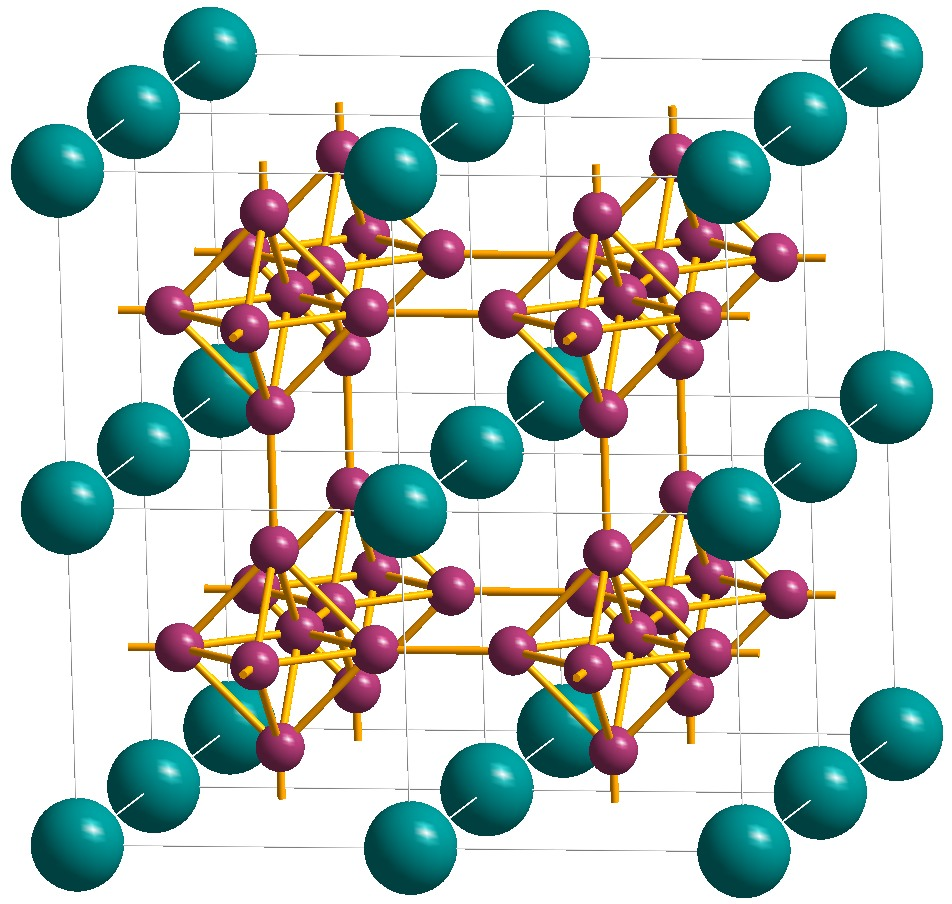

Names
- Other names Praseodymium boride

Identifiers
CAS Number	12008-27-4
3D model (JSmol)	Interactive image
ChemSpider	62852859
ECHA InfoCard	100.031.382
EC Number	234-534-2
PubChem CID	170843463
CompTox Dashboard (EPA)	DTXSID601311387
- InChI: InChI=1S/6B.Pr Key: QHGDJAMSTQXPDI-UHFFFAOYSA-N
- SMILES: [B].[B].[B].[B].[B].[B].[Pr]

Properties
Chemical formula	PrB_{6}
Molar mass	205.77 g/mol
Appearance	Black crystals
Density	4.84 g/cm^{3}
Melting point	2610 °C

Structure
Crystal structure	Cubic
Space group	Pm3̅m; O_{h}
- Except where otherwise noted, data are given for materials in their standard state (at 25 °C [77 °F], 100 kPa). verify (what is ?) Infobox references

Praseodymium hexaboride is a binary inorganic compound of praseodymium and boron with the formula PrB_{6}. It forms black crystals that are insoluble in water.

== Preparation ==
Praseodymium hexaboride can be prepared by reaction of stoichiometric quantities of praseodymium and boron:

Pr + 6B → PrB_{6}

== Properties ==
Praseodymium hexaboride forms black crystals in the cubic crystal system, with space group Pm3̅m, unit-cell parameter a = 0.4129 nm and Z = 1. Its structure is isotypic with that of calcium hexaboride.

The compound melts congruently at 2610 °C.

Praseodymium hexaboride undergoes magnetic ordering at low temperatures. An antiferromagnetic transition occurs near 7 K, and additional magnetic phase transitions have been reported at lower temperatures.

Praseodymium hexaboride is insoluble in water.

== Uses ==
Praseodymium hexaboride is used as a component of alloys for cathodes in high-power electronic devices.
