= Chandrabhaga =

Chandrabhaga may refer to:

== Rivers ==
- Chenab River in Punjab, India
- Bhima River near Pandharpur, Maharashtra, India
- Chandrabhaga River (Purna River) in Maharashtra, India

== Other uses ==
- Chandrabhaga Dam (disambiguation)
  - Chandrabhaga Dam (Amravati), Maharashtra, India
  - Chandrabhaga Dam (Nagpur), Maharashtra, India
- Chandrabhaga beach in Odisha, India
- Chandrabhaga (Ramayana), a historical character in Indian epic Ramayana, wife of Kushadhwaja
- Bekasi, a city in West Java, Indonesia
- Bekasi Regency, a regency in West Java, Indonesia

== See also ==
- Chenab (disambiguation)
- Asikni (disambiguation)
