= Biratunga =

- Village
- Location in Orissa, India
- Coordinates: 19.98°N 86.03°E
- Country: India
- State: Odisha
- District: Puri
- Elevation: 6 m (20 ft)

Languages
  - Official: Oriya
- Time zone: UTC+5:30 (IST)
- PIN: 752116
- Telephone code: 067
- Vehicle registration: 0R-13

Biratunga is one of the villages situated in the Gop tehsil of Puri district, Orissa, India. Biratunga is located approximately 3 kilometers away from its tehsil Gop town, 40.8 kilometers away from Puri city and 68 kilometers away from Bhubaneswar, the capital city of Orissa.

There are 60 garh (forts) located at different places of Orissa including Biratunga. The central temple (Kendraasana Mandira-केंद्र आसन मंदिर) of Sadguru Swami Nigamananda and Nilachala Saraswata Sangha are located at Biratunga. Biratunga is also the birthplace of Shri Durga Charan Mohanty, one of the most eminent disciples of Sadguru Swami Nigamananda. It is believed that Shri Mohanty has undergone all religious and spiritual practices (sadhana) and attained enlightenment (siddhi) in Biratunga. He has written about 27 volumes of a series of religious/spiritual literature called Sangha Sevaka.

== Villages ==
The following villages are under Biratunga panchayat:

- Sauria
- Biratung
- Nahiti
- Marad
- Gadakaramala
- Girima job card list
- Kanti
- Manapada

== Rural developments ==
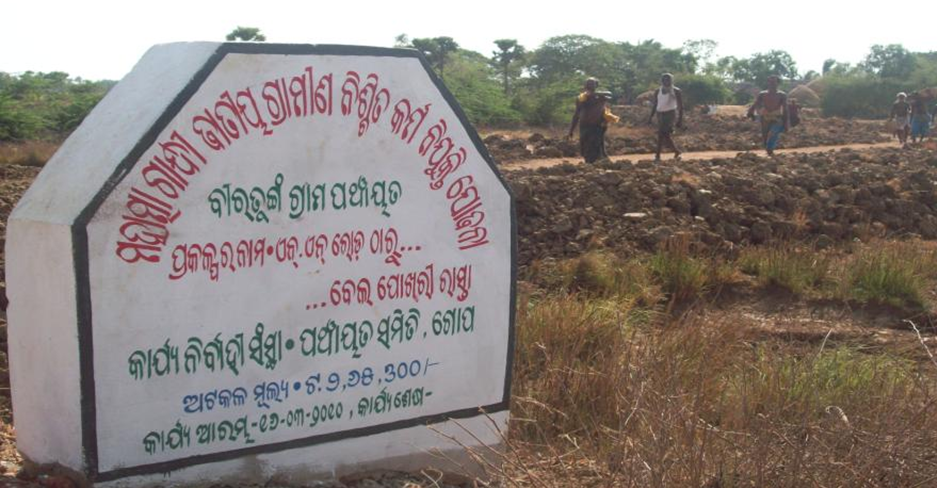
Biratunga Gram Panchayat Work under MGNREGA scheme

Biratunga panchayats has undertaken various rural development works under Mahatma Gandhi National Rural Employment Guarantee Act (MGNREGA) scheme. A skill development programme under Panchayati Raj department from Orissa Government has been implemented for rural village youths in orissa to enhance their skills for a secure employment. Biratunga is listed out of those villages from Puri district. Biratunga was awarded "Niramal Gram Puraskar" by Government of India, Ministry of Rural Development of Drinking Water and Sanitation in 2007.

== Schools ==
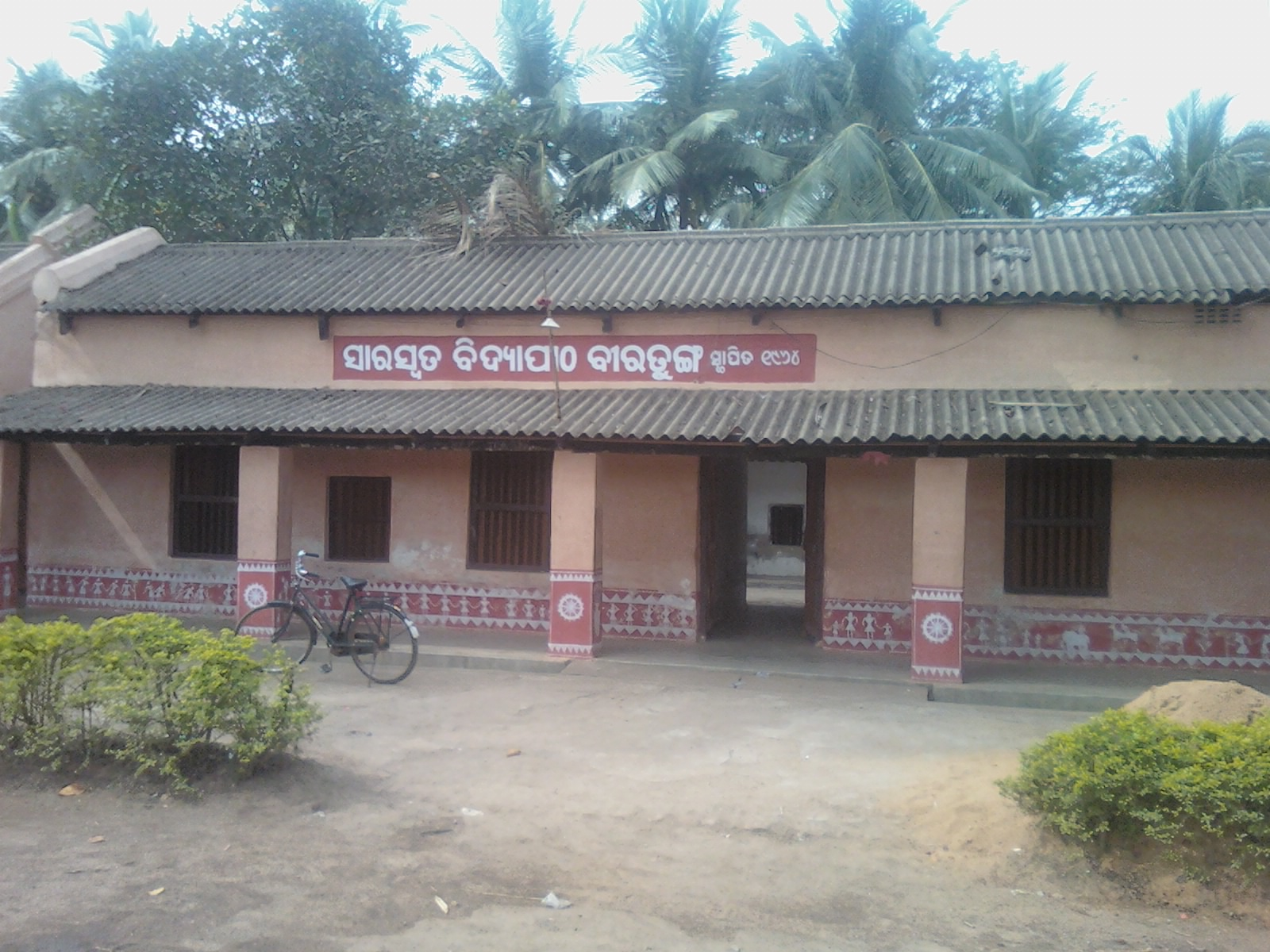
Saraswata Bidyapitha (High School) in Biratunga

Saraswata Bidyapitha, established in 1964 by Durga Charan Mohanty. This is a high school approved by the Government of Orissa.

== Nearby important places ==
- Kakatpur Mangala Temple
- Gop
- Pipili
- Konark
- Puri
- Chilika
- Bhubaneswar

== Gallery ==
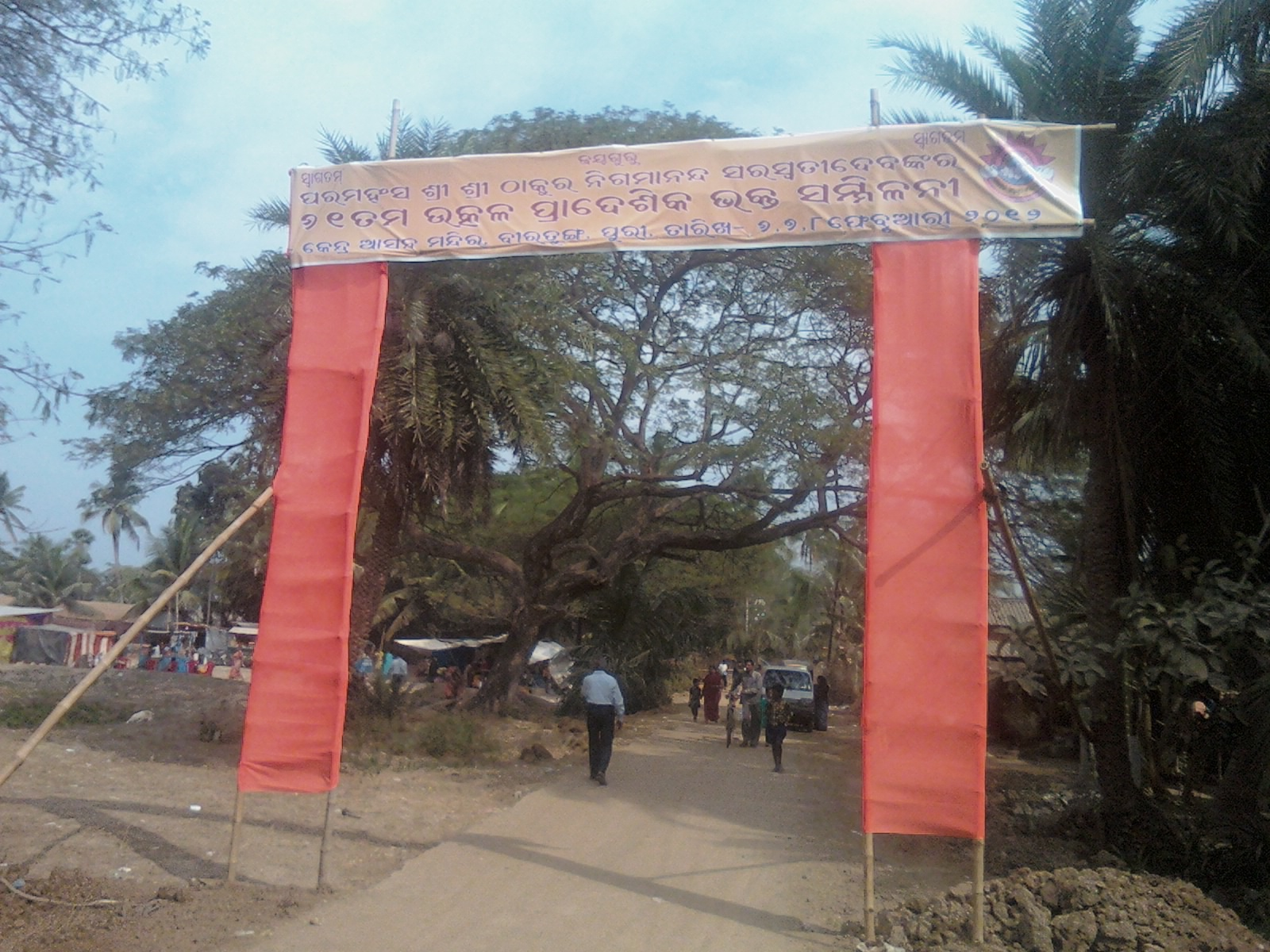

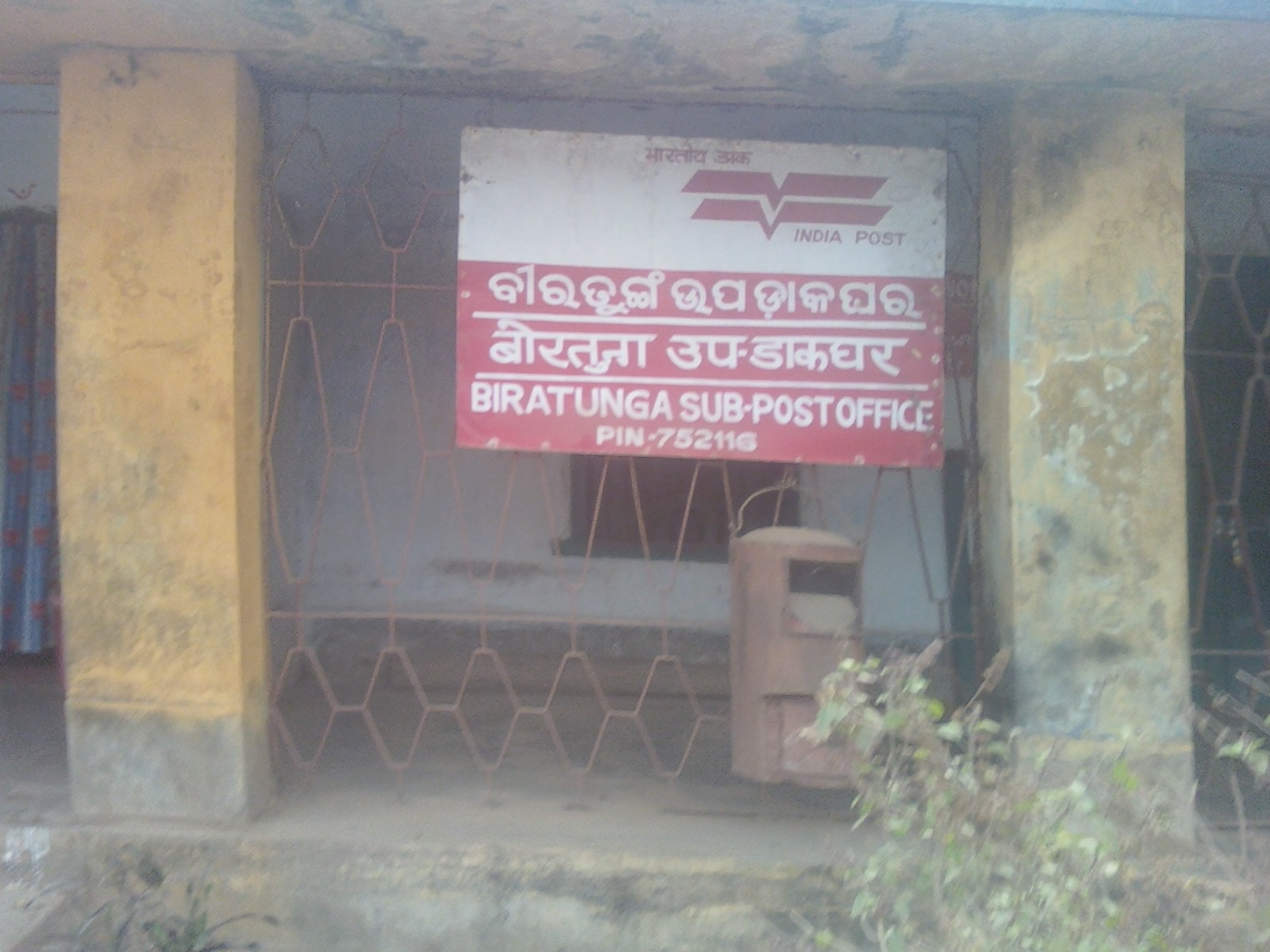

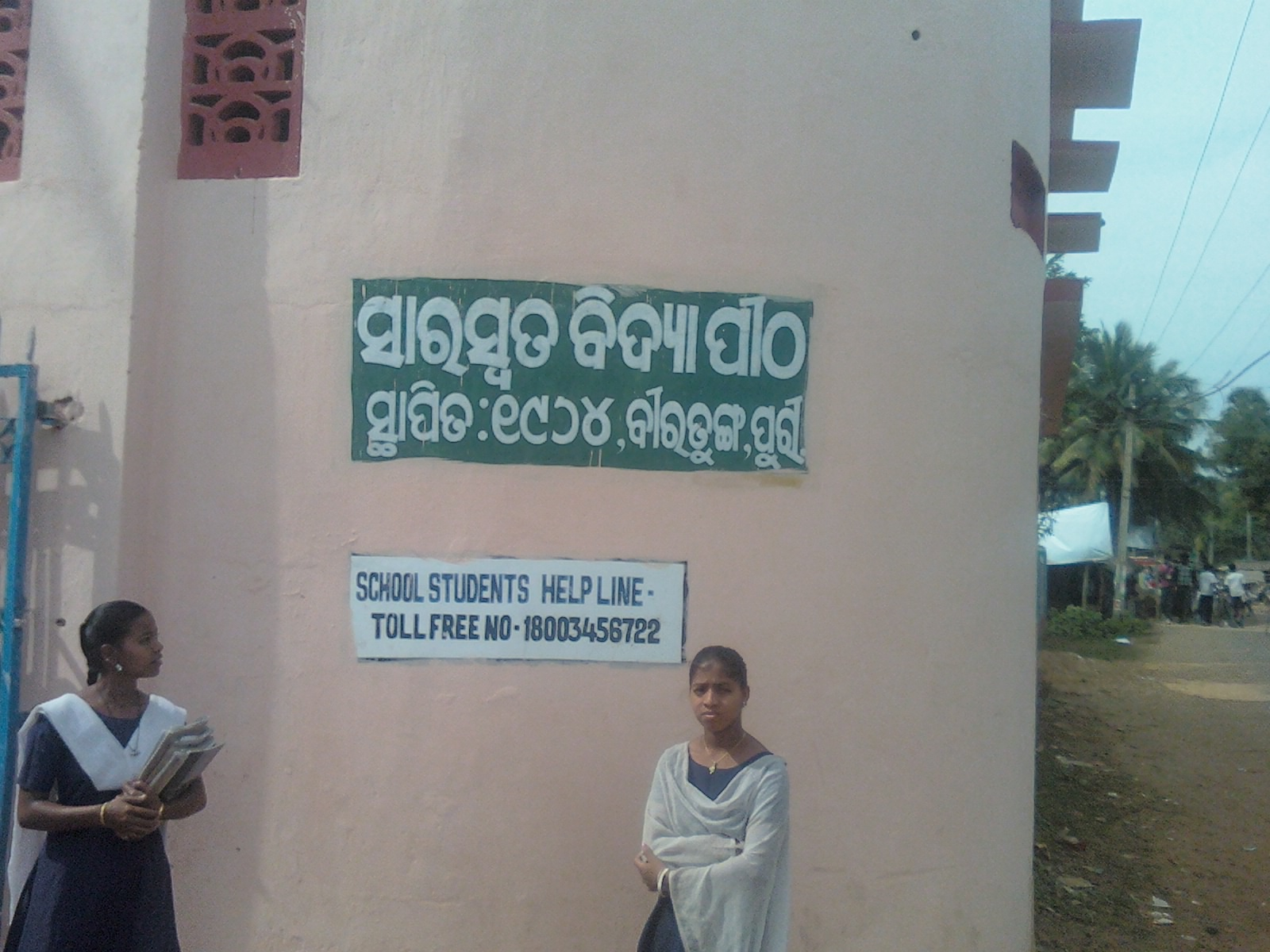

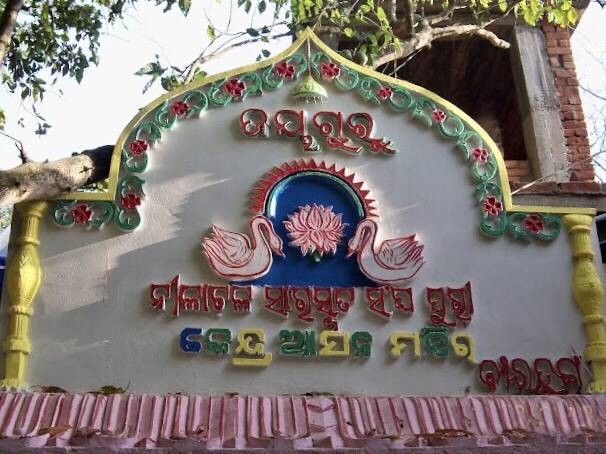

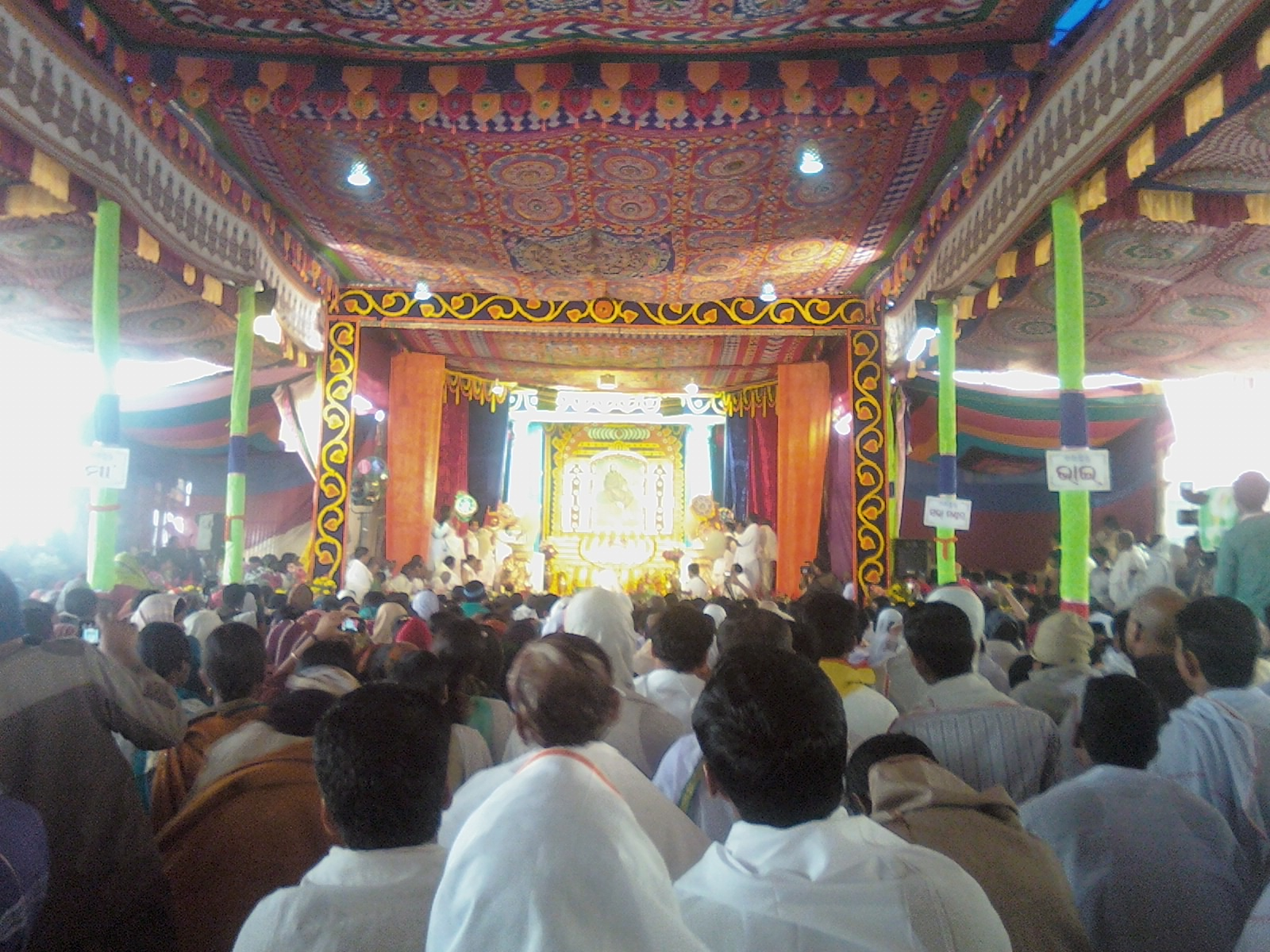

== See also ==
- Gop
- Mahatma Gandhi National Rural Employment Guarantee Act
