= Chenab =

Chenab may refer to:

== Places ==
- Chenab River, a river in India and Pakistan
- Chenab Valley, a river valley in India
- Chinab, a village in Iran

== Other ==
- Chenab College Jhang, a public college in Jhang, Pakistan
- Chenab Express, Pakistan Railways
- Chenab Group, Pakistani company
- Chenab Rail Bridge, rail bridge in India
- Mita Chenabi, a 17th century poet and physician
- SS Chenab, a ship

== See also ==
- Asikni (disambiguation), Sanskrit name of the river
- Acesines (disambiguation), Greek and Latin name of the river
- Chandrabhaga (disambiguation), the Sanskrit etymon of the river's name
