= Kanchinarayan Mohanty =

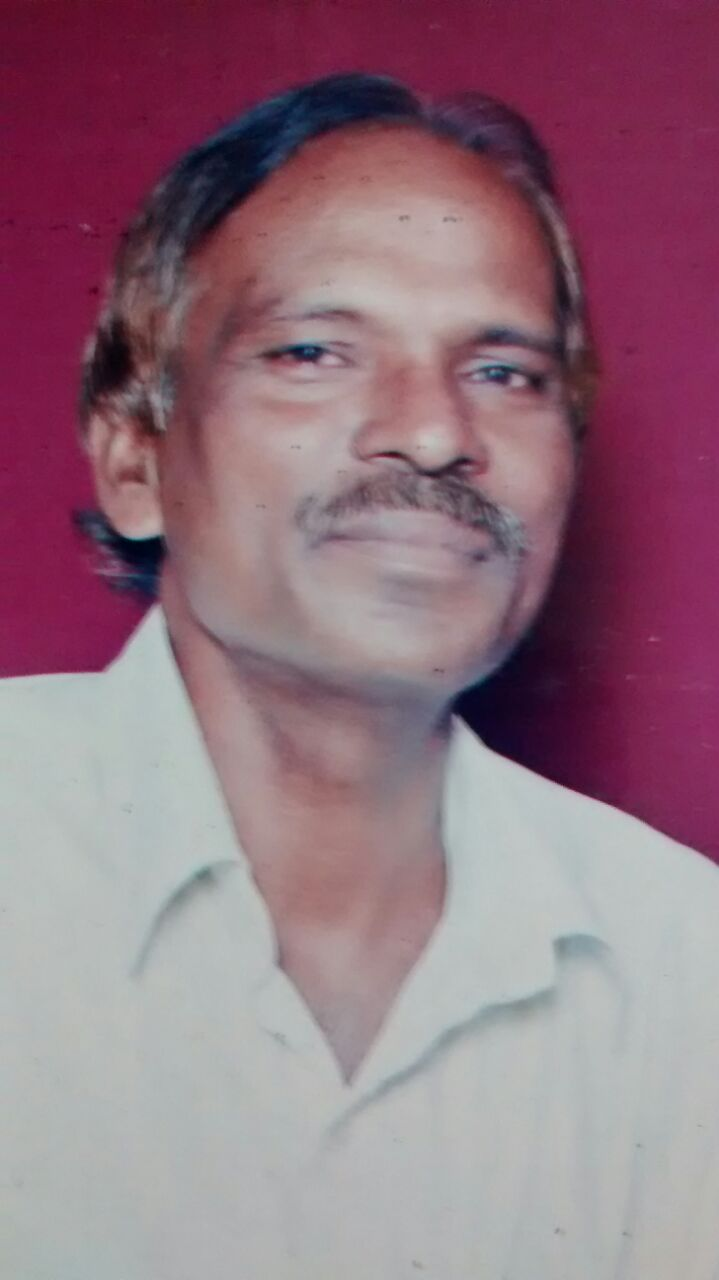
- Born: 12 February 1956 (age 69); Govindpur, Cuttack, Odisha, India
- Spouse: Pravat Nalini Mohanty
- Children: Ananya Mohanty, Siddhant Mohanty
- Parent(s): Late Gopal Charan Mohanty, Smt. Nishamani Mohanty
- Awards: Banikantha Nimain Harichandan award Brajamohan memorial honour

Kanchi Narayan Mohanty is a writer, poet, short story writer, playwright, lyricist, dramatist, off-screen voice over artist, radio contributor and literature personality. He writes in Odia, English, Bengali Hindi.

== Early life ==
He was born on 14 April 1956 to Late Gopal Charan Mohanty and Smt. Nishamani Mohanty in Noda Goan at Govindpur police station in the Cuttack district in the Indian state of Odisha.

After completing class VII, he was admitted to Saraswata Vidyapitha, in the Biratunga village of the Puri district. There he was inspired by a teacher, Shri Shyama Sunder Nanda. He took first prize in an essay competition organized by the Odisha student council.

He earned his Bachelors in Commerce from Utkal University. After completing graduation from Ravenshaw university he started his professional career as an auditor in the finance department of the Odisha government in 1984. He retired from government services as an audit officer to become a writer, and now works in the fields of literature, radio, TV script writing, and translation work.

== Career ==
His wrote stories, features, humor and poems published in Hindu Chetana, The Samay, The Prajatantra, and other magazines. He was creatively inspired by his uncle, Srijukta Durga Charan Mohanty, a writer and Odisha Sahitya Academy awardee in 1965.

He is an impaneled B+, drama voice of the All India Radio Cuttack station and an approved off-street voice of the DD Odia – a channel of Doordarshan, India's public service broadcast, in Bhubaneshwar. He wrote dialogue for the TV serial "Sankha Sindhura," and has also published at least 45 books of his own writing glorifying children's literature and the intellectual horizon. He scripts his works in Odia, English, Bengali & Hind

== Recognition ==
He has received at least 30 literary awards in various fields.

- He was honoured in the centenary celebrations of Banikantha Nimain Harichandan in 2001.
- He received the Brajamohan memorial honour in 2014 for his overall career.
- He won the state level children literature Award in 1982 and 1984.

== Bibliography ==
1. Upagalpa Shataka -published by Satyanarayan Bookstore
2. Kalajayi Prashna-Uttara -published by Satyanarayan Bookstore
3. Gandhi Mahatma -published by Friends Publisher
4. Chaturbidha Sadhanasiddha Mahapurusha Niigamananda' -published by Satyanarayan Bookstore
5. Banikantha Nimai Harichandan -published by Odisha Bookstore
6. SriPurushottama Chala Jiba -published by Ananya Publications.
7. Swami Ramatirtha -published by Chinmaya Prakashan
8. Sata Mo Bachana -published by Satyanarayan Bookstore
