= Konark Dance Festival =

Dance festival in India

Konark Dance & Music Festival
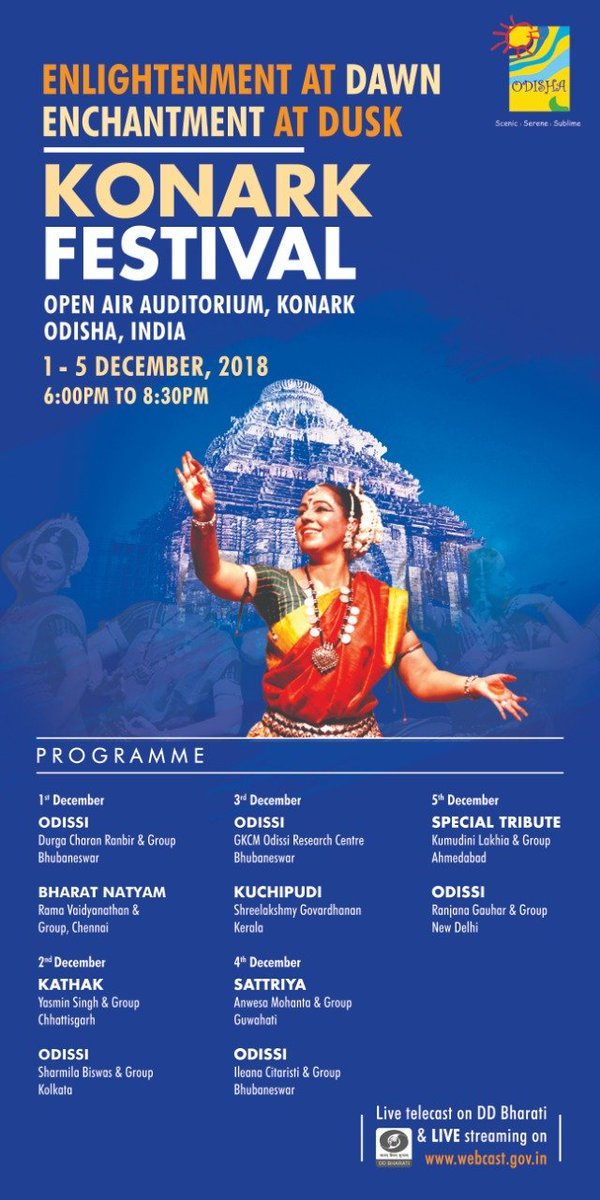
- Status: Active
- Genre: Cultural Festival
- Begins: 1 December
- Ends: 5 December
- Frequency: Annually
- Venue: Konark Natya Mandap
- Locations: Konark, Odisha
- Coordinates: 19.896176°N 86.083599°E
- Country: India
- Inaugurated: 1986
- Founder: Guru Gangadhar Pradhan
- Most recent: 2023
- Previous event: 2022
- Major events: Indian Classical Dance Performances
- Patron: Odisha Tourism
- Organiser: Odissi Research Centre
- People: Kelucharan Mohapatra
- Website: konarkfestival.com

Konark Dance Festival is a five-day dance festival held every year in the month of December mostly from 1 to 5 in backdrop of the Sun temple in Konark, Odisha in India. It is one of the biggest dance festivals held in Odisha.

The shrine's 'Salamander' chamber, also called the 'dancing hall,' is notable for its richly carved walls. It's sculptures depict musicians with drums, cymbals, and other musical instruments alongside figures in Odissi dance poses.

Many celebrated dancers from all over the country perform at this venue. Since 1986, this festival has been organized in the state jointly by Odisha Tourism and Odissi Research Centre to promote the diverse Indian dance heritage as well as the popularity of Konark Temple and Odisha as a tourist destination.

Along with this, during the same period, International Sand Art Festival also takes place.

The Sand festival celebrates sand sculptures produced by skilful sand artists. Not just the traditional sand sculptures, you may expect sand, stone, bronze or wood, created by skilful sand artists. The International Sand Artist Festival celebrates the spectacular displays of sand artists from India and from many other countries. As many as 30 Indian and 10 foreign artists participate in this Competition-turned-Festival. Best sand artists from Mexico, Spain, Singapore, France, Norway, Germany, Netherland & USA and remaining 20 artists are from different states of India usually grace the golden beach of Chandradrabhaga.

The International Sand Art Festival was started in 2015 on the Chandrabhaga beach, a short distance from Konark, Puri, Odisha, India. It was a part of the Konark Dance Festival that is organized during the same time. Every year, the theme for the Artists hover around the burgeoning issues of the Earth.
