= Chari Kshetra =

Four holy regions in Odisha

Coordinates: 19.808661°N 85.835675°E

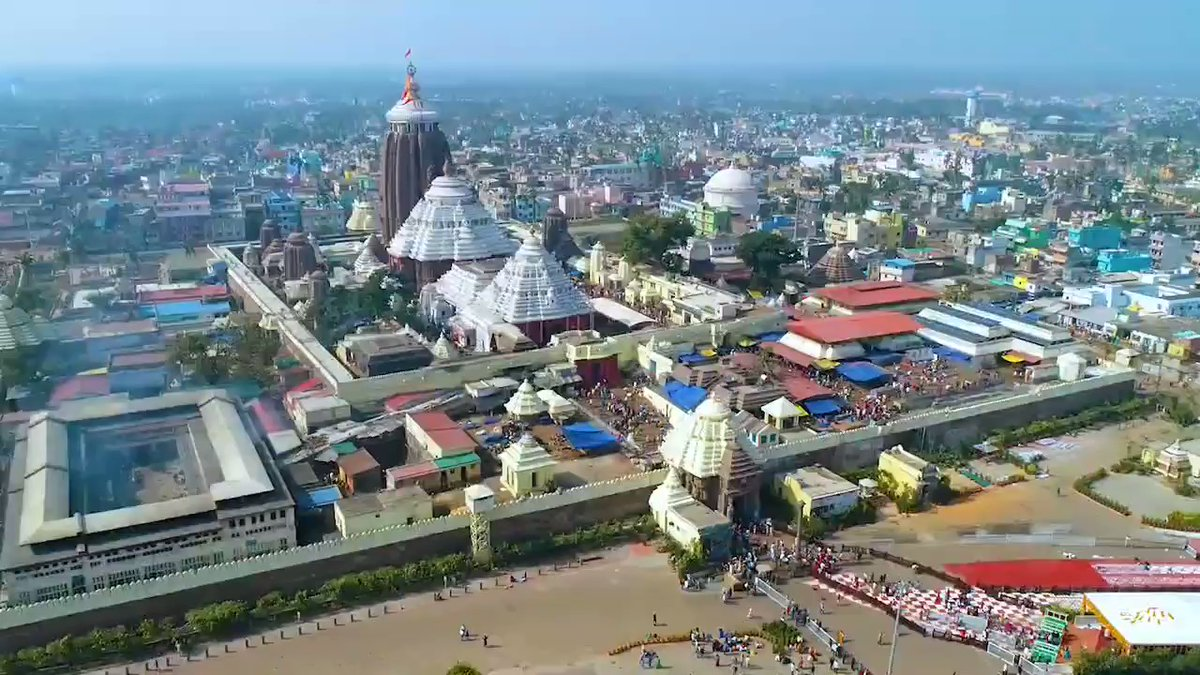
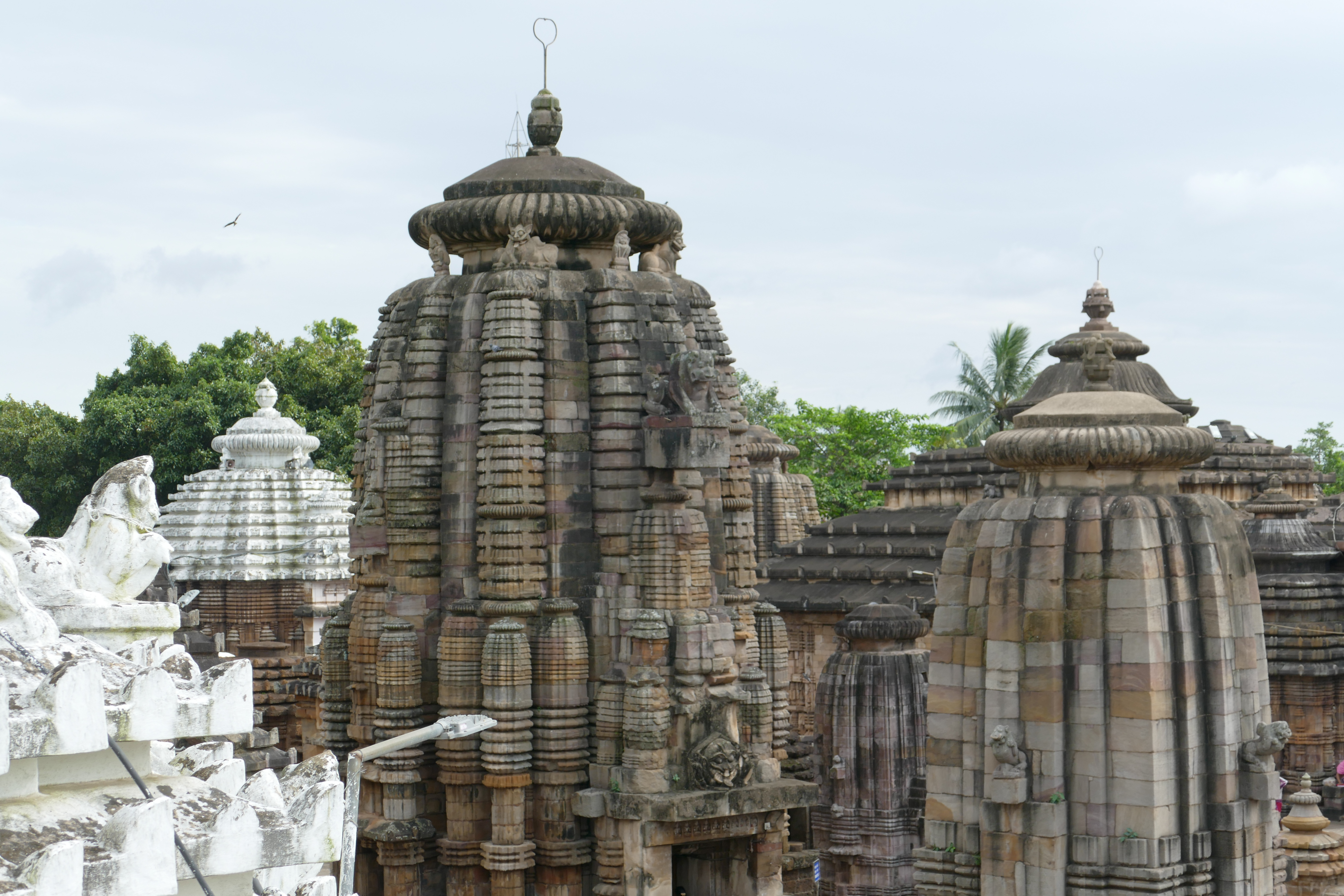
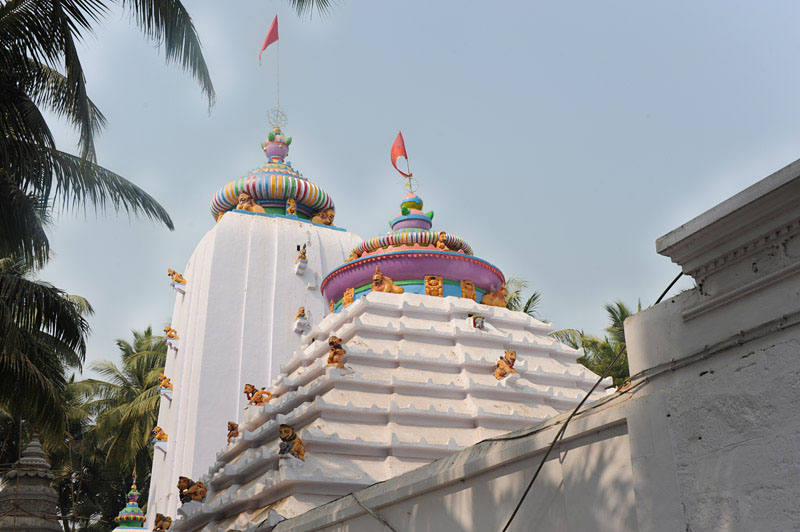
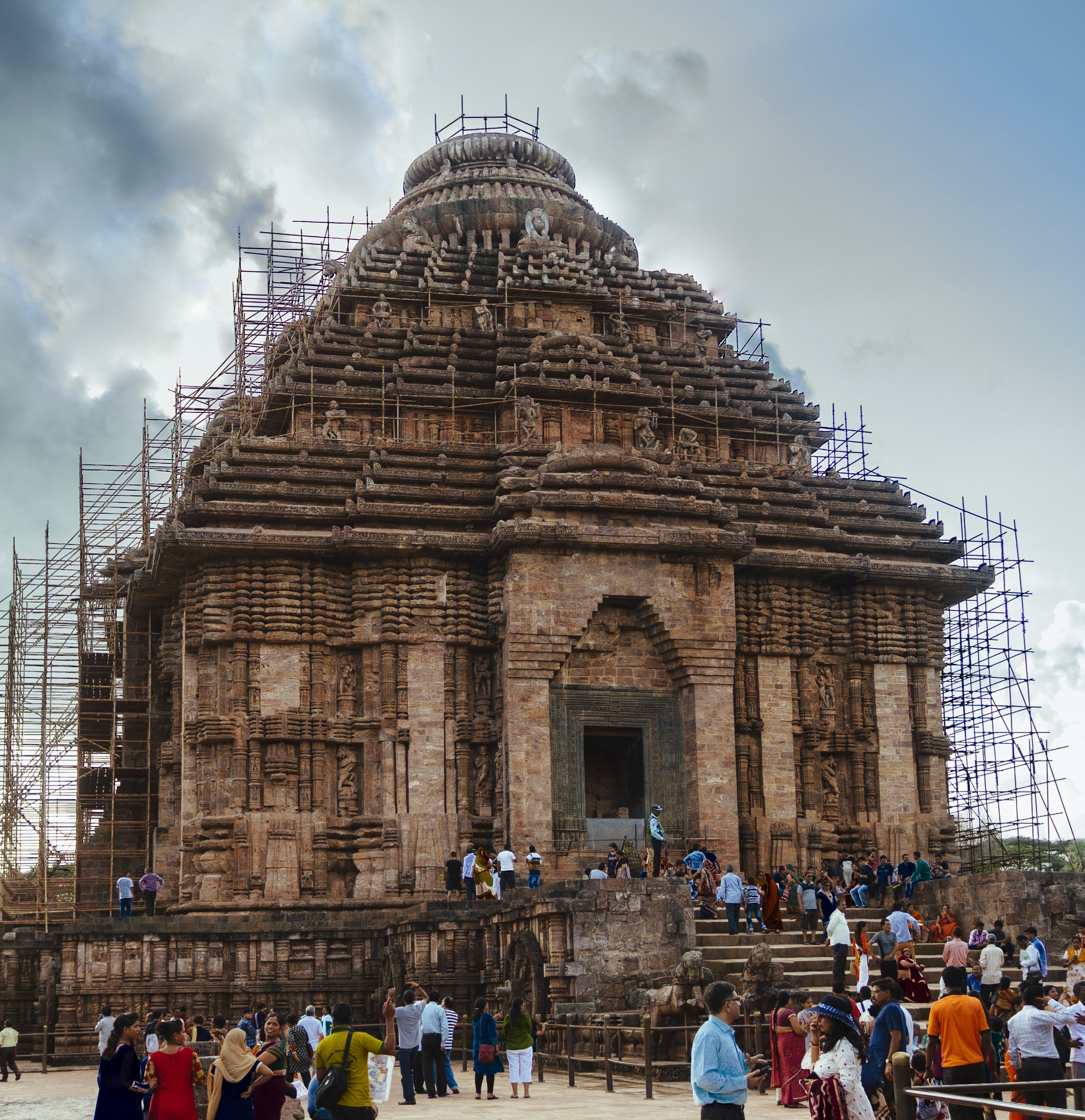
- Location: Puri, Bhubaneswar, Jajpur and Konark
- Governing authority: OTDC

Chari Kshetra (literally four holy regions) is a group of four holy regions in the Indian state of Odisha. According to tradition, when Vishnu killed the demon Gayasura, to commemorate the glory of his victory, he placed his shankha (conch) in Puri, chakra (discus) in Bhubaneswar, gada (mace) in Jajpur and padma (lotus) in Konark and they were known as Sankha Kshetra, Chakra Kshetra, Gada Kshetra, and Padma Kshetra respectively.

== Sankha Kshetra ==
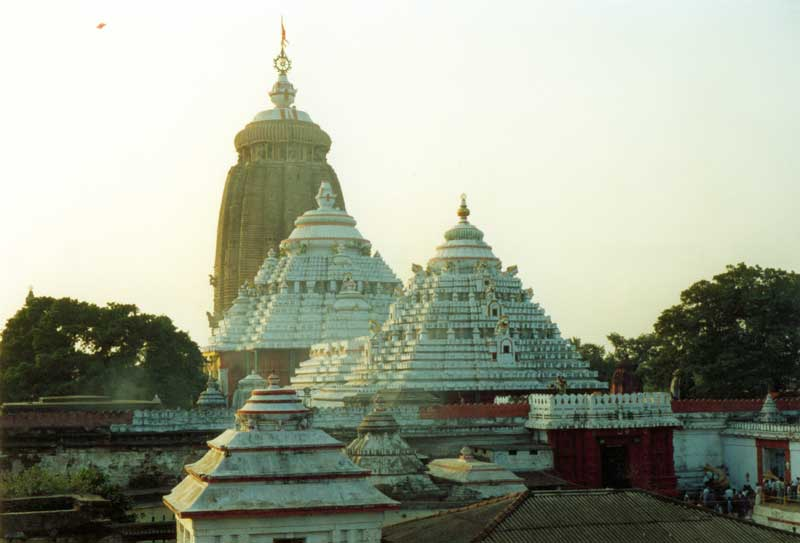
Jagannath Temple of Puri, the Centre of the Sankha

In the Sacred Geography of Puri : Structure and Organisation and Cultural Role of a Pilgrim Centre, Nityanand Patnaik detailed the following structure of the Puri centre:

The first zone is in the form of the archetypal circle within which the modem wooden icons are represented standing on the Lion throne. In the words of the Visrttt Reliasya of the Brahma Purana "In the centre of the seven enclosures, in the cave of the Blue Mountain there is an abode . . . full of “consciousness". The text explains that inside "the three innermost circuits, Vishnu, the highest Purusa, is present in the wooden form.

The second circuit is in the shape of a hexagon. In the six angles are depicted four goddesses: Durga-VimaIa, Kamala-Laksmi, Uttara Durga and Batamangala, together with Garuda on the south, and the summit of the Blue Mountain on the north. In the outer eastern facing spaces are found Sarasvati, the Salmotaru tree, and the Golden Well. In the western ones are the sacred banyan tree, the Rohini Well, and Uchchhishta Ganapati.

The third circuit consists of a circle with a sixteen-petalled lotus. On the petals are placed the eight Sivas and right Saktis who guard the Lion throne. These deities are found on the Blue Hill and are as follows: Agnisvara, Indranidevi, Ksetrapala, Svanabhairavi. Multtesvara. Citraltali, Vatamarltandeya, Katyayani, Gopesvara, Bedakali, Patalesvara, Bhuvartesvari, Vailtuntesvara, Jagnesvari, lsanesvara, and Sitala.

The fourth zone is in the form of a yantra or square with four points of access. It corresponds to the Blue Mountain (Nila-achal/Niladri) with its gateways and steps.

The fifth circuit is in the shape of it sixteen-petalled lotus. This mandala comprises the Candis and Sambhus who guard the outer perimeter of the hill. The Sivas are Viiwesvara, Markantleiwara, Mahakalesvara, Karnainesvara, Muktesvara, Ugresvara, Kapala-mocana and Agnisvsra, also the Goddesses Visvesvari, the Saptamatrika (stone images of the Mothers from the Somavansi period at the Martandeya tirtha), Dakshinakali, Charchika, Alamesvari, Varahi, Vanadurga, and Vaseli.

The sixth is in the form of a lotus that contains the major sacred bathing places and the four oldest monasteries at Puri. The panchatirtha consists of the Markandeya Pool, the Rohini Well, the King Indradyumna Lake and sometimes includes Svetaganga, while the four ashrama are Angira in the east, Bhrgu in the south, Pandu in the west, and Markandeya in the north.

The seventh and last circuit is in the shape of a conch-shell. On the top of the shankha is a huge symbol of Lokanatha Svaymbhu, and on the southeast tip, the Vilvesara temple. The last three Sivas, together with Kapalamocana and Goddess Ardhasini, act as the day and night guardians of the town. Nilakantha is the governor of the kshetra, Narasimha protects the places where the fire ceremony is performed. Both Svargadvara, with its cremation ground and Chakra tirtha are represented on the map. Surrounding the city is the sea below, the sky above and a branch of the Bhargavi River which forms the handle of the Sankha kshetra.
