= Durga Charan Mohanty =

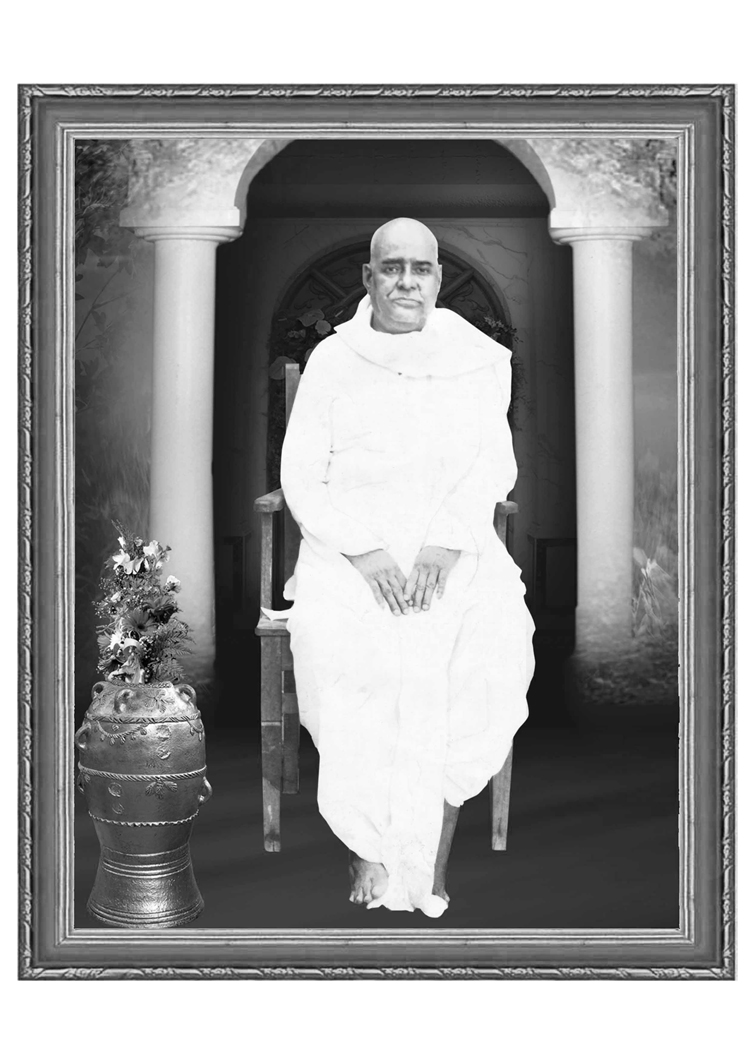
- Born: 1912; Biratunga, (Odisha)
- Died: 7 December 1985
- Occupations: Author, dharmic writer, spiritualist
- Awards: Odisha Sahitya Akademi(1957–58)

Durga Charan Mohanty (1912–1985) was an Odia Indian spiritual writer born in 1912 at Biratunga, a village under block Gop, near Konark, Odisha. The Odia Sahitya Akademi has been awarded to him in 1956–58 due to his active involvement in development of Odia language and literature Being a disciple of Swami Nigamananda, he wrote many books and translated Nigamananda's own-written Bengali books to Odia language. He was Secretary/Parichalaka of Nilachala Saraswata Sangha).

== Family ==
He was born in an aristocratic Karan family. His father Gunanidhi Mohanty was a Jamindar and mother Sundarmani Mohanty was President of Nilachala Saraswata Sangha (Women Association).

== Spiritual career ==
After reading Yogiguru (योगीगुरु) and Premikaguru (प्रेमिकगुरु) respectively, authored by Swami Nigamananda, at Raghunandanan Library, Puri, the vigraha(portrait) of Swami Nigamananda present in the books attracted him very much. At the same time he began worshiping this portrait and considered Nigamananda as his spiritual master and revered God. He began to search Nigamananda and finally met him in Nilachala Kutir Puri on 20 March 1930, Thursday. At that time he was only seventeen years old and a student of class IX in Puri district School. On first meeting he was overwhelmed by his appearance and realised Nigamananda as Ishwar. Since that day, he became a regular visitor to Nilachala Kutir for his darshan. He used to note down guru Nigamananda's sayings(upadesh), later he published these "upadesh"(gospels)in books like Nilachala Vani and Nigama Upadesh. Subsequently, he wrote many books for Nilachala Saraswata Sangha and translated Nigamananda's originally written Bengali books, ବ୍ରହ୍ମଚର୍ୟ ସାଧନା(Brahamcharya Sadhana), ଯୋଗୀଗୁରୁ(Yogi Guru), ଜ୍ଞାନୀ ଗୁରୁ(Gyani Guru), ତାନ୍ତ୍ରିକ ଗୁରୁ(Tantrika Guru), and ପ୍ରେମିକଗୁରୁ(Premika Guru), into Odia language. On Trilochan Ashtami, 5 June 1934, he was initiated as disciples of Swami Nigamananda. Being a disciple of Nigamananda, Mohanty spent his entire life on his service. Due to Mohanty's pioneer efforts over a hundred Nigamananda Ashrams were established and survive in Odisha. He continued to preach Nigamananda's philosophy till he left his physical body on 7 December 1985 at Biratunga.

== Books on Durga Charan Mohanty ==
The following books in Odia are published by Nilachala Saraswata Sangha on Durga Charan Mohanty's life, works, achievements :

- ଉତ୍କଳରେ ଠାକୁର ଶ୍ରୀ ଶ୍ରୀ ନିଗମାନନ୍ଦ ଓ ଭାଇ ଦୁର୍ଗାଚରଣ (Utkalre thakur shree shree Nigamananda o bhai durga charan).
- ଭାବ ବିନିମୟ (Bhava Binimaya).
- ଆଦର୍ଶ ଗୁରୁପ୍ରାଣ ଦୁର୍ଗାଚରଣ ଭାଇ (Adarasa guruprana durgacharan bhai).
- ସାର୍ବଭୌମ ଗୁରୁ ଶ୍ରୀ ଶ୍ରୀ ଠାକୁର ଓ ପରିଚାଳକ(Sarbabhouma guru shree shree thakur o parichalaka).
- ଭାଇ (Bhai)

+ ପରିଚାଳକଙ୍କ ବାଣୀ (Parichalakanka Bani) – By Banchhanidhi Mishra

== Works ==
School

The High School, Saraswata Bidyapitha was established by him in 1964 at Biratunga his own village.

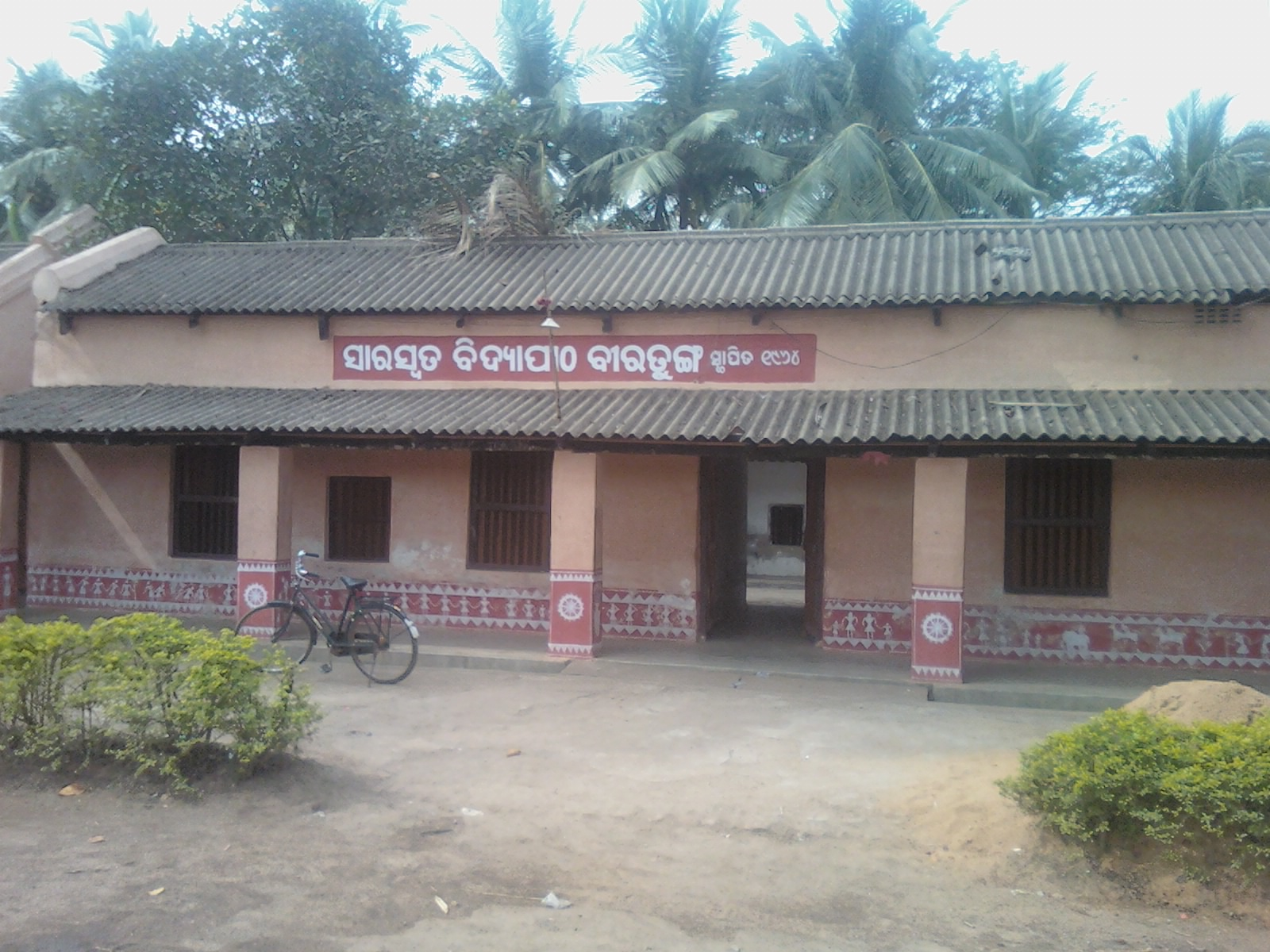
Saraswata Bidyapitha established by Durga Charan Mohanty in village Biratunga

Books and publications ( Names given in Odia, Roman and Devnagari scripts)

The series of books written/translated by him for Nilachala Saraswata Sangha in Odia are listed here:

- ସାରସ୍ୱତ ଗ୍ରନ୍ଥାବଳୀ(Saraswata Granthabali)
1. ଯୋଗୀଗୁରୁ -YogiGuru-योगीगुरु
2. ପ୍ରେମିକଗୁରୁ-PremikaGuru-प्रेमिकगुरु
3. ତାନ୍ତ୍ରିକ ଗୁରୁ-TantrikGuru-तांत्रिकगुरु
4. ଜ୍ଞାନୀ ଗୁରୁ-Gyaniguru-ज्ञानीगुरु
5. ବ୍ରହ୍ମଚର୍ୟ ସାଧନା-Brahamacharya Sadhana-ब्रह्मचर्य साधना]
- ନିଗମ ଗ୍ରନ୍ଥମାଳା -Nigama Granthamala (निगम ग्रन्थमाला)

Odia Sahitya Akademi winner book Bhagwan Shankaracharya written by Durga Charan Mohanty

1. ଶ୍ରୀ ଶ୍ରୀ ଠାକୁର ନିଗମାନନ୍ଦ – Shree Shree Thakur Nigamananda (श्री श्री ठाकुर निगमानंद)
2. ନିଗମ ଲହରୀ – Nigam Lahari (निगम लहरी)
3. ନିଗମ ତତ୍ୱ – Nigam Tatwa ( निगम तत्व)
4. ଶ୍ରୀ ନିଗମାନନ୍ଦ କଥାମୃତ (୧,୨,୩) – Shree Nigamananda Kathamruta (I, II & III) (श्री निगमानंद कथामृत १, २, ३)
5. ନିଗମ ଉପଦେଶ-Nigam Upadesh (निगम उपदेश)
6. ନୀଳାଚଳ ବାଣୀ – Nilachala Vani (नीलाचल वाणी)
7. ଶ୍ରୀ ଶ୍ରୀ ଗୁରୁ ଗୀତା-Shree Shree Guru Gita (श्री श्री गुरुगीता)
8. ବେଦାନ୍ତ ବିବେକ – Vedanta Bibeka (वेदांत विवेक)
9. ନିଗମାନନ୍ଦ କଥା ସଂଗ୍ରହ (୧,୨) – Nigamananda Katha Sangraha ( I & II) (निगमानंद कथा संग्रह १,२)
10. ସଂସାର ପଥେ – ଭାବନା – Sansar Pathe (Bhavana) (संसार पथे – भावना)
11. ସଂସାର ପଥେ – ସିଦ୍ଧି – Sansar Pathe (Siddhi) (संसार पथे – सिद्धि)
12. ସଂସାର ପଥେ – ସାଧନା – Sansar Pathe (Sadhana) (संसार पथे – साधना)
13. ସଂସାର ପଥେ – ସଂଗ୍ରାମ – Sansar Pathe (Sangram) (संसार पथे – संग्राम)
14. ଭକ୍ତ ସମ୍ମିଳନୀ – Bhakta Sammilani ( भक्त सम्मिलनी)
15. ସାରସ୍ୱତ ସଂଘ ନୀତି – Saraswata Sangha Nitti (सारस्वत संघ निति)
16. ତତ୍ୱ ମାଳା – Tatwa Mala (तत्व माला)
17. ନିର୍ଜନ – Nirajana (निर्जन)
18. ସଂଘ ସେବକ – Sangha Sevaka (संघ सेवक)
19. ସତୀ ଚରିତ୍ର ମାଳା – ଆଦର୍ଶ ନାରୀ ଜୀବନ – Satti Charitra Mala (Adarsha Naari Jeeban) (सति चरित्र माला – आदर्श नारी जीवन)
20. ସତୀ ଚରିତ୍ର ମାଳା – ଆଦର୍ଶ ଗୃହିଣୀ – Satti Charitra Mala (Adarsha Gruhini) (सति चरित्र माला – आदर्श गृहिणी)
21. ସତୀ ଚରିତ୍ର ମାଳା – ଆଦର୍ଶ ନାରୀ ତତ୍ୱ ସାଧନା – Satti Charitra Mala (Adarsha Naari Tawta Sadhana) (सति चरित्र माला – आदर्श नारी तत्व)
22. ସତୀ ଚରିତ୍ର ମାଳା – ଆଦର୍ଶ ଜନନୀ – Satti Charitra Mala (Adarsa Janani) (सति चरित्र माला – आदर्श जननी)

Other Writings

- ଭଗବାନ ଶଙ୍କରାଚାର୍ଯ୍ୟ – Bhagwan Shankaracharya (भगवान शंकराचार्य) Odia Biography-Travelogue
- ବଳି ଭେଟ – Bali Bheta (बळी भेट).
- କଣ ହେଲା ରେ ! – ସାମାଜିକ ନାଟକ – Kan Hela Re! -Samajika Nataka (कण हेला रे! -सामाजिक नाटक).
- କିଚକ ବଧ – Kichaka Badha (किच्चक बद्ध).
- ଗୋ ବ୍ରାହ୍ମଣ – Go Brahamana (गो ब्राह्मण).

== Honors ==
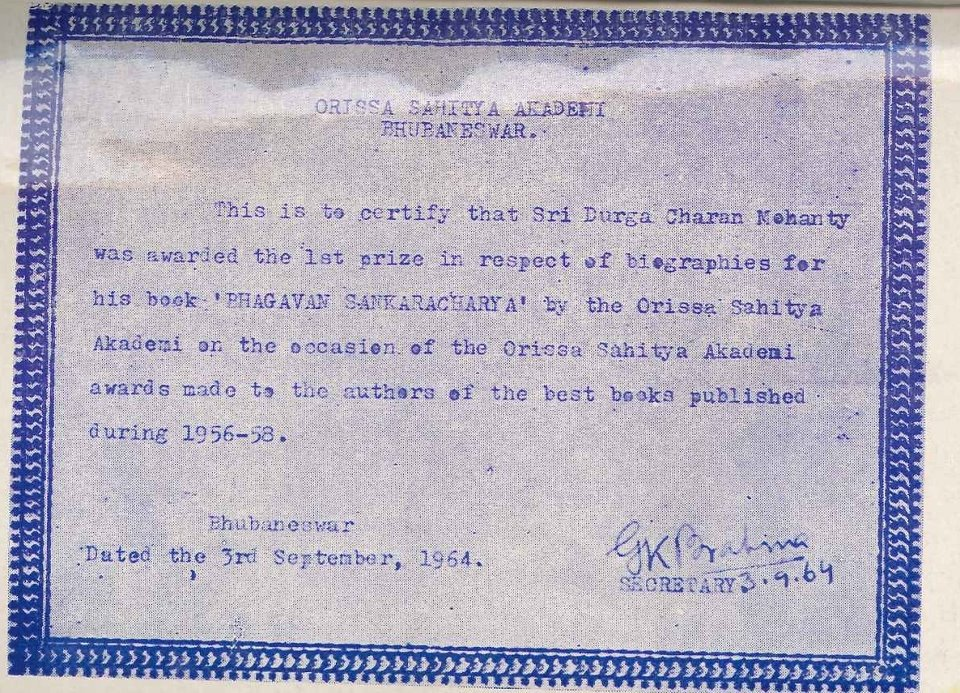
Certificate from Odisha Sahitya Akademi, issued on 3 September 1964,

Sri Durga Charan Mohanty was awarded with the prestigious Oriya Sahitya Akademi award ( an award given for working actively for the development of Oriya language and literature) by Oriya Sahitya Akademi for his outstanding contribution in the form of a written book Bhagawan Sankaracharya which was published in 1956–58.

== Social activities ==
According to few sources, he was also a notable social leader in Odisha.

== News and updates ==
Nilachala Saraswata Sangha celebrated 100th Birthday of Sri Durga Charan Mohanty with much fervor and spiritual enthusiasm on 9 November 2011 with approximate 3500 Nigamananda devotees at Biratunga. This function is started on 9 November 2011 and said to be continued till November 2012.

== See also ==
- Swami Nigamananda
- Odisha Sahitya Akademi Award
- Nilachala Saraswata Sangha
