= Acesines =

Acesines may refer to:

- Acesines (bug), a genus of insects in the family Pentatomidae
- Alcantara (river), a river in Sicily, known in Ancient Greek as: Ἀκεσίνης - Akesínes; Latinized to Acesines
- Chenab River, a river in South Asia, known in Ancient Greek as: Ἀκεσίνης - Akesínes; Latinized to Acesines

== See also ==
- Asikni (disambiguation)
- Chenab (disambiguation)
