= Chandrabhaga Dam =

Chandrabhaga Dam may refer to any of the following dams in India:

- Chandrabhaga Dam, Amravati, dam on Chandrabhaga river located near Amravati in Maharashtra, India
- Chandrabhaga Dam, Nagpur, dam on Chandrabhaga river located near Kamleshwar, Nagpur district in Maharashtra, India
