= Asikni =

Asikni may refer to:

- Asikni (river), an ancient name of the Chenab River of India and Pakistan
- Asikni (goddess), a Hindu goddess also known as Panchajani or Virani

== See also ==
- Acesines (disambiguation), Greek form of the river's name
- Chenab (disambiguation)
- Chandrabhaga (disambiguation)
