= Timeline of Puri (city) =

The timeline of Puri lists the important historical dates for the town of Puri in Orissa.

== Timeline ==
- 1042 CE – Introduction of the Madala Panji (scripture of Orissa) from the Puri Temple.
- c. 1229 – Puri is known as Purusottama Kshetra.
- 1934 – Nilachala Saraswata Sangha, religious organization established by Swami Nigamananda
- 1948 – Puri integrated into Odisha.
- 1957 – Chintamani Panigrahi(former Governor of Manipur) was elected to the 2nd Lok Sabha from Puri constituency
