= Nilachala Kutir =

Nilachala Kutir is a religious residence, formerly owned by Swami Nigamanananda, located in the holy city of Puri, India on the shores of the turbulent Bay of Bengal. Nilachala Kutir is a one-storey building situated near the "Swargadwara" landmark in Puri.

== History ==
After retirement from Saraswata Matha, Swami Nigamananda came to Puri in 1923. Initially he stayed in a rented house called "Giri Kutir", there after he bought and moved to a building house subletted from Govardhana matha and spent the rest of his life there. The house was named Nilachala Kutir and continues to exist in its place today.

On the first day of the month of Vaisakha, 1924, "Griha Prabesha" (a spiritual ceremony performed when entering to a new house) was performed at the Nilachala Kutira in Puri. On 20 March 1930, Durga Charan Mohanty met Swami Nigamananda for the first time and on 23 March 1934, Durga Charan Mohanty received his first instruction on Asana and Mudra from Thakurdas Brahmachari (Haren Bhai) at Nilachala Kutir. Prafulla Chandra Bhanja Deo(king of Bastar) stayed at Nilachala Kutir for eight days for important discussions regarding his Tantrik sadhana in 1931. Religious Organization, Nilachala Saraswata Sangha was established by Swami Nigamananda, exclusively for his household devotees in Orissa on 24 August 1934, on his birthday, at Nilachala Kutir, Puri. His 134th birthday celebrated successfully at Nilachala Kutira Puri on 21 Aug 2013.

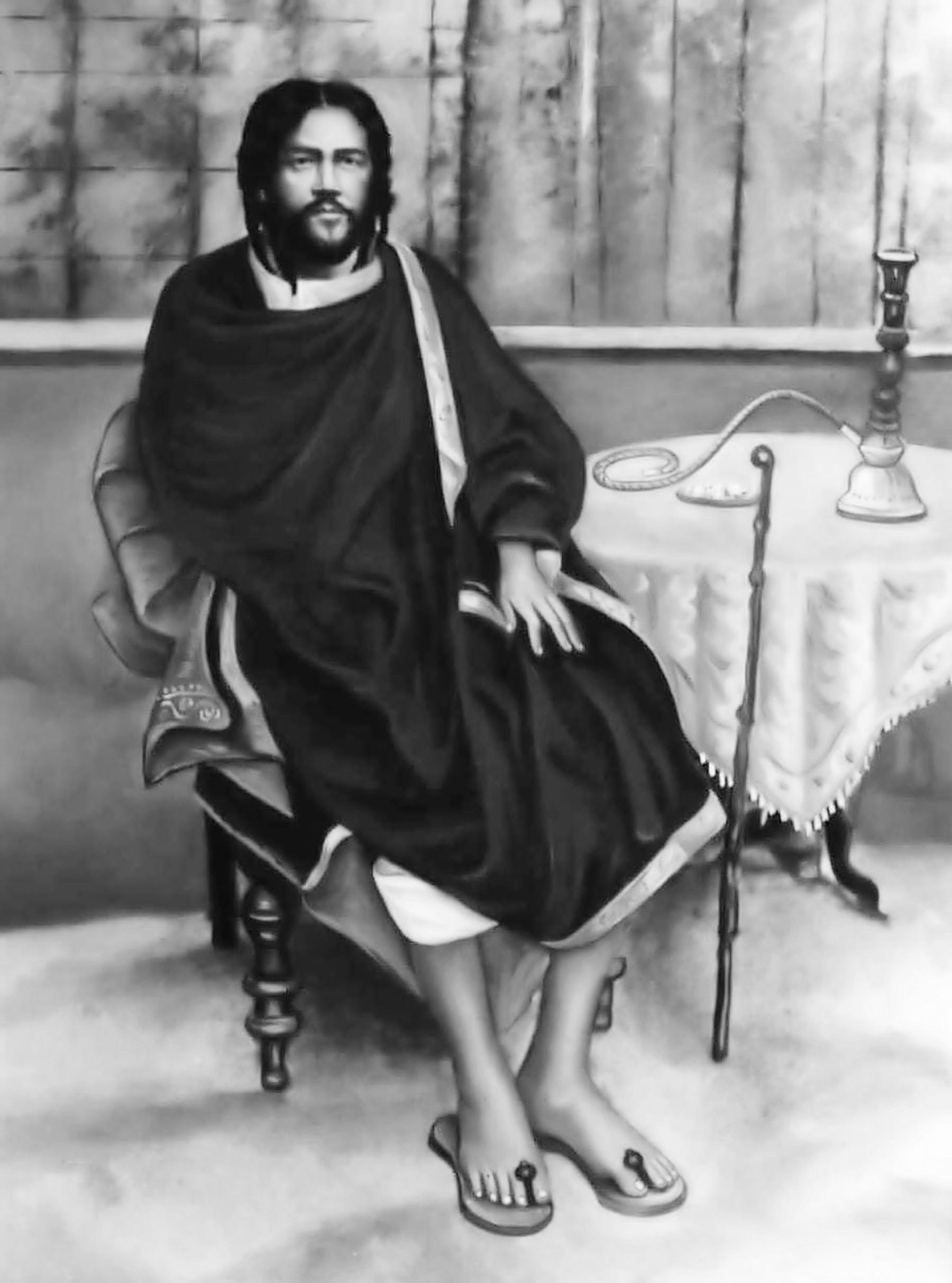
Swami Nigamananda (Owner of Nilachala Kutir)
