= Nilachala Saraswata Sangha =

Hindu worship organisation

Nilachala Saraswata Sangha नीलाचल सारस्वत संघ
- Formation: 1934
- Purpose: Spirituality
- Headquarters: Satsikhya Mandira, Bhubaneswar, Odisha, India
- Website: https://www.nsspuri.org/

Nilachala Saraswata Sangha (NSS), (Oriya: ନୀଳାଚଳ ସାରସ୍ବତ ସଂଘ; Hindi: नीलाचल सारस्वत संघ) is a religious organization that was founded by Swami Nigamananda Paramahansa Dev exclusively for his household devotees in Odisha on 24 August 1934 at Nilachala Kutir, Puri, India.

NSS is one of the spiritual foundations of Swami Nigamananda after Saraswata Matha, established at Kokilamukh, Jorhat, in 1912. The "Sangha" focus only on spirituality (धर्म नित्ति, dharma nitti) with three core objectives: formation of ideal family, combined of Sangha Power, and exchange of spiritual thoughts.

Banamali Dash was the first president of this Sangha, subsequently Durga Charan Mohanty became its Secretary and Parichalaka or Administer.

== History ==
Swami Nigamananda was on a short retirement from his busy work. He left Assam Bangiya Saraswata Matha, Jorhat, (Assam) and came to Puri in 1923. He bought Nilachala Kutir near the Puri seashore, and it was there, that he spent the last 14 years of his life. While living at Nilachala Kutir, the majority of people who met him on the quest of truth and knowledge could immediately discern the divine quality in him.

Durga Charan Mohanty had the opportunity to read the masterpieces, Yogiguru (योगीगुरु), and Premikaguru (प्रेमिकगुरु), authored by: Swami Nigamananda, in a library. His look at a vigraha, of Swami Nigamananda, present in the books, attracted him so much, that having seen it, he felt as if a current of thought vibrated in his mind. He felt a very close relationship with this portrait in past lives. With that realization, he began identifying with the Swami. He came to know that Swami Nigamananda was residing in Saraswata Matha, Kolilamukh, Jorhat, Assam. He wrote a letter to the Matha, desiring to know more about Swami Nigamananda. He was replied to by the Matha, that Swamiji was residing at Puri. March 20-1930 (Thursday), he met Swami Nigamananda for the first time, at Nilachala Kutir. Thereafter, he became a regular visitor to Nilachala Kutir for Swamiji's darshan. Durga Charan Mohanty was initiated (Diksha) as a disciple of Swami Nigamananda, in the year 1934.

Durga Charan Mohanty noted all discussions, pieces of advice of Swami Nigamananda, and various everyday happening at Nilachala Kutir, and later published it in books, called “Nilachala Vani"( नीलाचल वाणी) and "Nigama Upadesha”(निगम उपदेश). Swami Nigamananda had told Durga Charan Mohanty that My disciples are around. They will come. Tell them about Me only when someone eagerly enquires. Obeying this advice, Durga Charan Mohanty had guided Nilachala Saraswata Sangha till 1985, his worldly departure at Biratunga. He wrote a lot of books on Swami Nigamananda and had opened more than 100 Nigamananda Ashram in Odisha. He wrote and published volumes of books, called "Sangha Sevaka"(संघ सेवक). As a "Sevak"(member) of Nilachala Saraswata Sangha, what kind of principles need to be followed are mentioned carefully in this series.

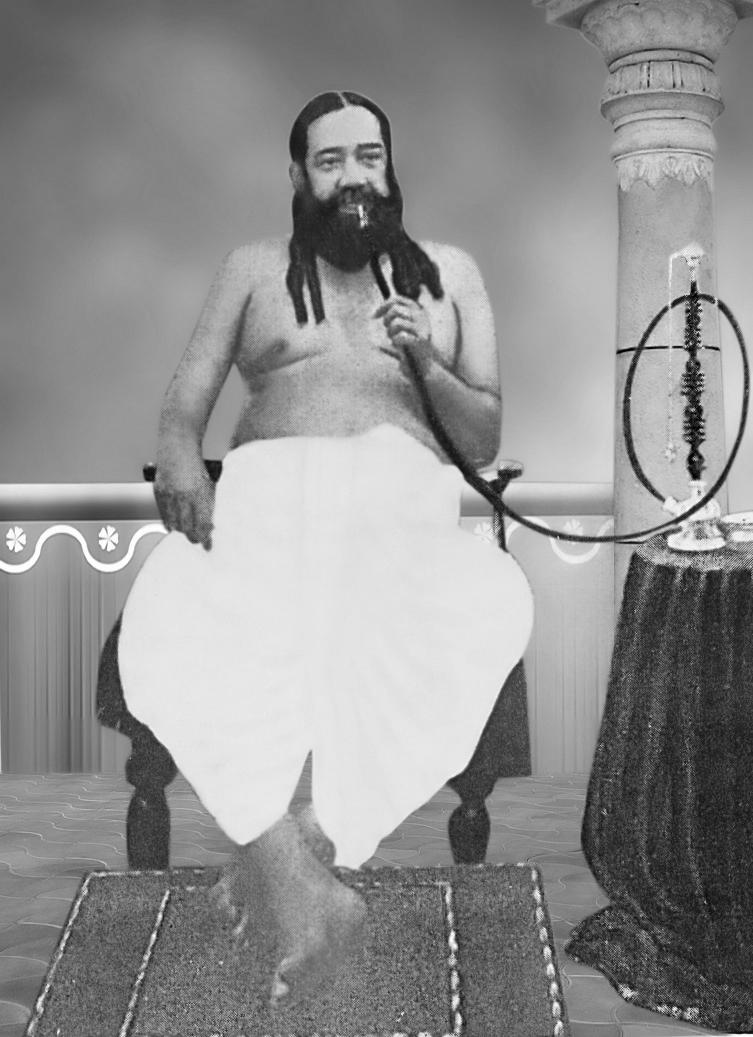
Swami Nigamananda at Nilachala Kutir Puri

The year 1934 was very memorable. Banamali Dash, Durga Charan Mohanty along with devotees, who were coming on the quest for truth and knowledge to Nilachala Kutir, sought permission from Swami Nigamananda to celebrate His birthday at Nilachala Kutir (Puri) on 24 August 1934, Full Moon day(Shrabana Purnima). On the occasion of His birthday Swami Nigamananda advised them to form a divine circle among themselves. As per His wishes, they started an association for religious talk, and thus Nilachala Saraswata Sangha(NSS) came into existence through the gradual growth of group discussion and prayer. The underlying principles of the Sangha were fulfilling the triple objectives viz:

- 1. to lead and ideal family life (आदर्श गृहस्थ गठन)
- 2. to establish more and more such associations or Sangha and (संघ शक्ति प्रतिष्ठा)
- 3. to exchange each other's thoughts and idea's among the disciples (भाव बिनिमय)

Swami Nigamananda deliberated with his disciples about Nilachala Saraswata Sangha principles especially the "formation of an ideal household life". According to Swami Nigamananda, He(self) should be worshipped. He taught them how His portrait should be placed on a royal chair giving utmost reverence generally paid to the Guru (spiritual master). He should be made the head of the family and ideal household life should be regulated under His direction.

His saying about ideal family:

My dear children! I wish all of you to become ideal family men. You should get united and exchange your thoughts among your brother disciples. These principles will afford you heavenly pleasure amidst the hum-drum life that surrounds you -SWAMI NIGAMANANDA

== See also ==
- Swami Nigamananda Paramahansa Dev
- Nilachala Kutir
- Shanti Ashram
- Timeline of Puri
- Durga Charan Mohanty
- Puri
