= Konark =

- Town
- Location in Odisha, India Konark (India)
- Coordinates: 19°53′27″N 86°06′01″E
- Country: India
- State: Odisha
- District: Puri
- Elevation: 2 m (6.6 ft)

Population (2001)
  - Total: 15,015

Languages
  - Official: Odia
- Time zone: UTC+5:30 (IST)
- Vehicle registration: OD
- Website: http://konark.nic.in

Konark is a medium-sized town in the Puri district in the state of Odisha, India. It lies on the coast by the Bay of Bengal, 65 kilometres from the state capital Bhubaneswar. It is the site of the 13th-century Sun Temple, also known as the Black Pagoda, built in black granite during the reign of Narasinghadeva-I. The temple is a World Heritage Site. The temple is now mostly in ruins, and a collection of its sculptures is housed in the Sun Temple Museum, which is run by the Archaeological Survey of India.

Konark is also home to an annual dance festival called Konark Dance Festival, devoted to classical Indian dance forms, including the traditional classical dance of Odisha, Odissi. In February 2019, the Konark Dance Festival (now called Konark Music and Dance Festival) will be hosting its 33rd edition. The state government is also organising annual Konark Festival and International Sand Art Festival at Chandrabhaga Beach of Konark.

On 16 February 1980, Konark lay directly on the path of a total solar eclipse.

== Etymology ==
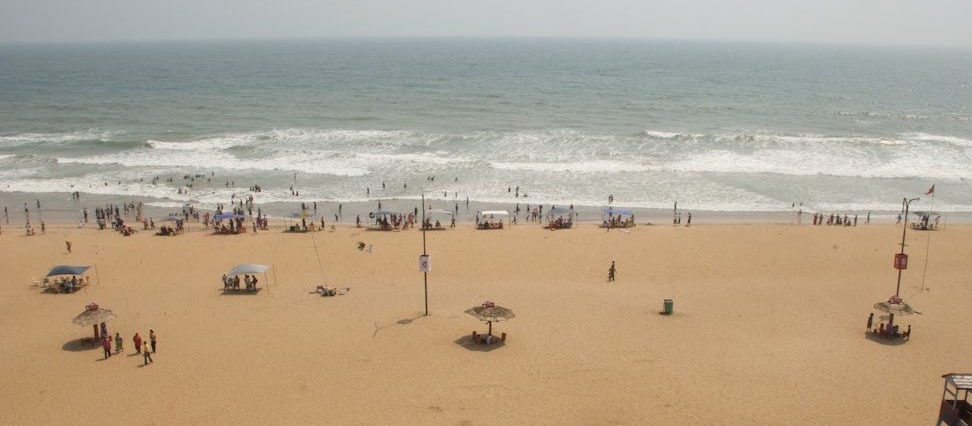
Konark beach view

The name Konârka is derived from the Sanskrit word Kona (meaning angle) and word Arka (meaning sun) in reference to the temple which was dedicated to the Sun god Surya.

== The Sun Temple ==
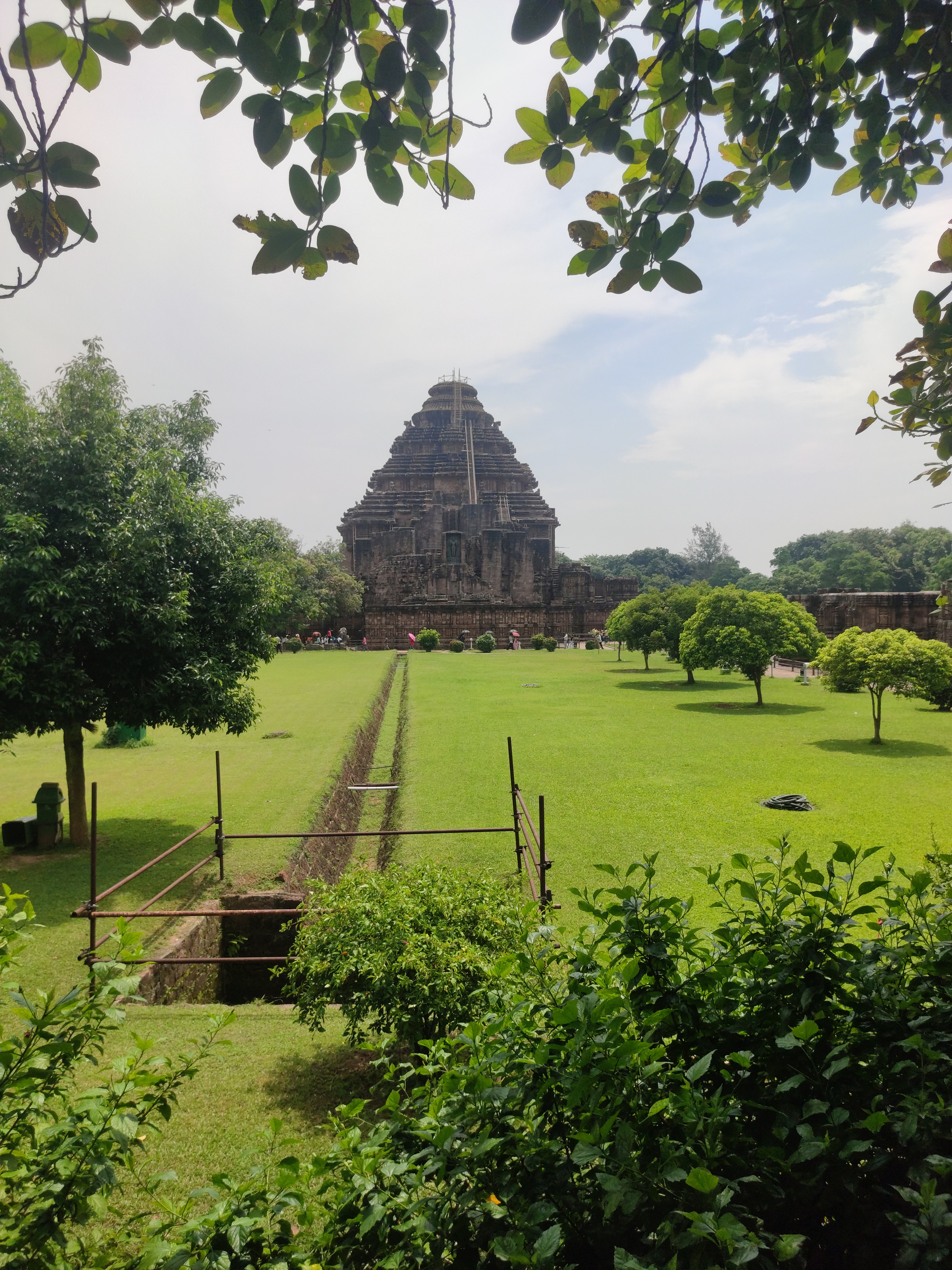
Konark Sun Temple

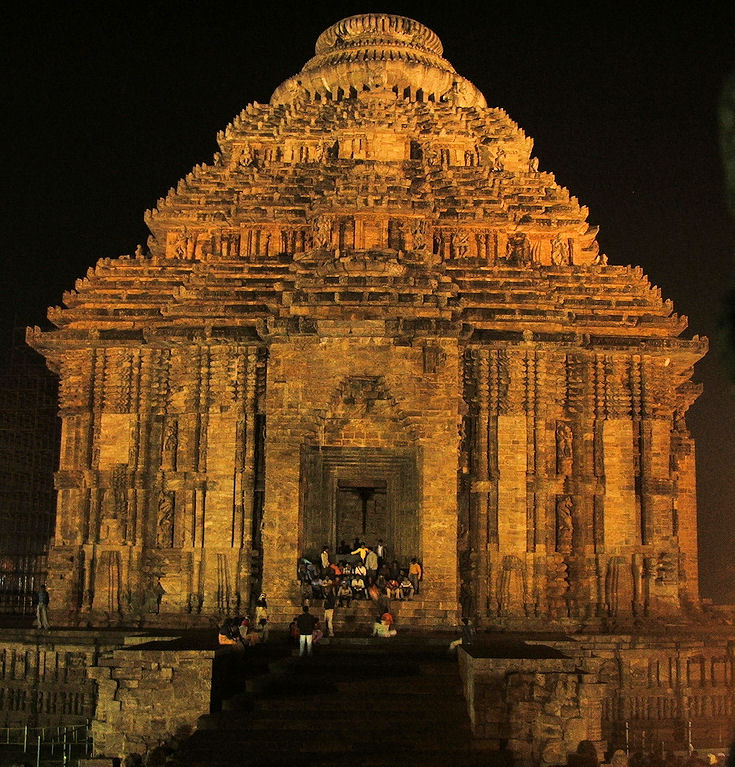
Konark Sun Temple

The Sun Temple was built in the 13th century and designed as a gigantic chariot of the Sun God, Surya, with twelve pairs of ornamented wheels pulled by seven horses. Some of the wheels are 3 metres wide. Only six of the seven horse still stand today. The temple fell into disuse after an envoy of Jahangir desecrated the temple in the early 17th century.

According to folklore, there was a diamond in the centre of the idol which reflected the sun rays that passed. In 1627, the then Raja of Khurda took the Sun idol from Konark to the Jagannath temple in Puri. The Sun temple belongs to the Kalingan school of Indian temple architecture. The alignment of the Sun Temple is along the east–west direction. The inner sanctum or vimana used to be surmounted by a tower or shikara but it was razed in the 19th century. The audience hall or jagamohana still stands and comprises majority of the ruins. The roof of the dance hall or natmandir has fallen off. It stands at the eastern end of the ruins on a raised platform.

== History ==
In 1559, Mukunda Gajapati came to throne in Cuttack. He aligned himself as an ally of Akbar and an enemy of the Sultan of Bengal, Sulaiman Khan Karrani. After a few battles, Odisha finally fell. The fall was also aided by the internal turmoil of the state. In 1568, the Konark temple was damaged by the army of Kalapahad, a general of the Sultan. Kalapahad is also said to be responsible for damages to several other temples during the conquest.

== Demographics ==
As of 2011 India census, Konark had a population of 16,779. Males constitute 8,654 (52%) of the population and females 8,125 (48%).As of 2001 Census Konark has an average literacy rate of 57%, lower than the national average of 59.5%: male literacy is 64%, and female literacy is 49%. In Konark, 14% of the population is under 6 years of age.

== Tourism ==
=== Attractions in Konark ===
- Konark temple: listed as one of the World Heritage Sites by UNESCO, the temples of Konark are the main attractions, providing a glimpse into the finest achievement of a lost masonry style.
- Chandrabhaga beach: one of the cleanest and most beautiful beaches in Odisha, it is the place of action for a lot of the legends behind Konark.
- Sun Temple Museum: run by the Archaeological Survey of India, the museum houses many of the artefacts from the temple.

=== Reaching Konark ===
Konark can be reached via a number of routes:

1. Reach Bhubaneswar either by Flight or Train, and then take a bus or a taxi to Konark (64 km from Bhubaneswar).
2. Reach Puri by Train (Puri is well-connected to the rest of India), and then take a bus or a taxi to Konark (34 km from Puri).

== Photo gallery ==
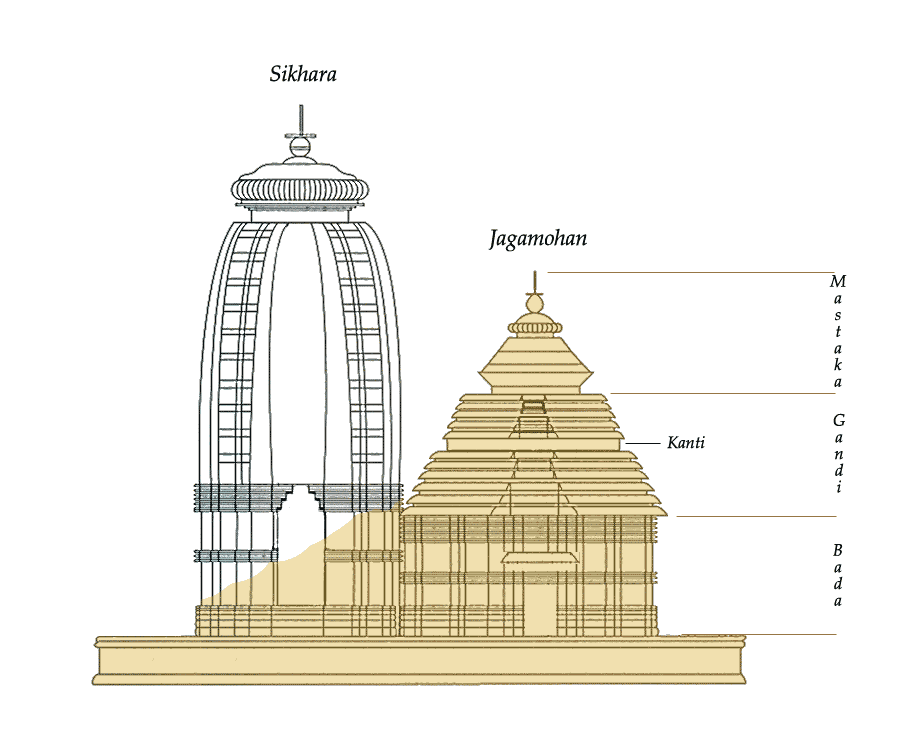
Original structure. Existing structure is in the dark.

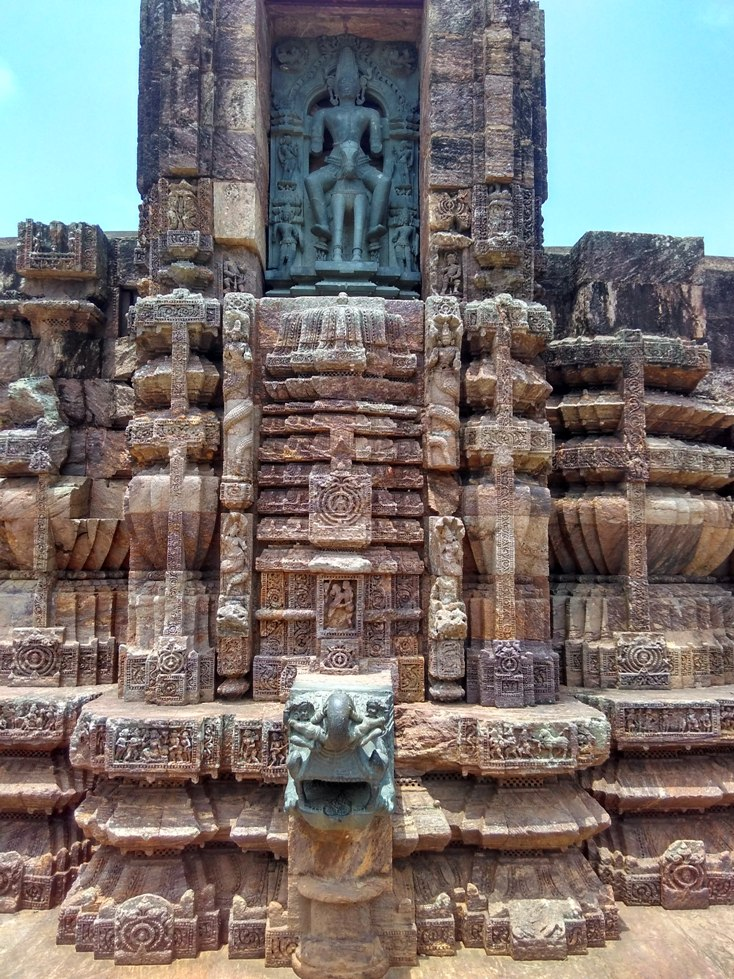
Image of Lord Surya, riding a horse

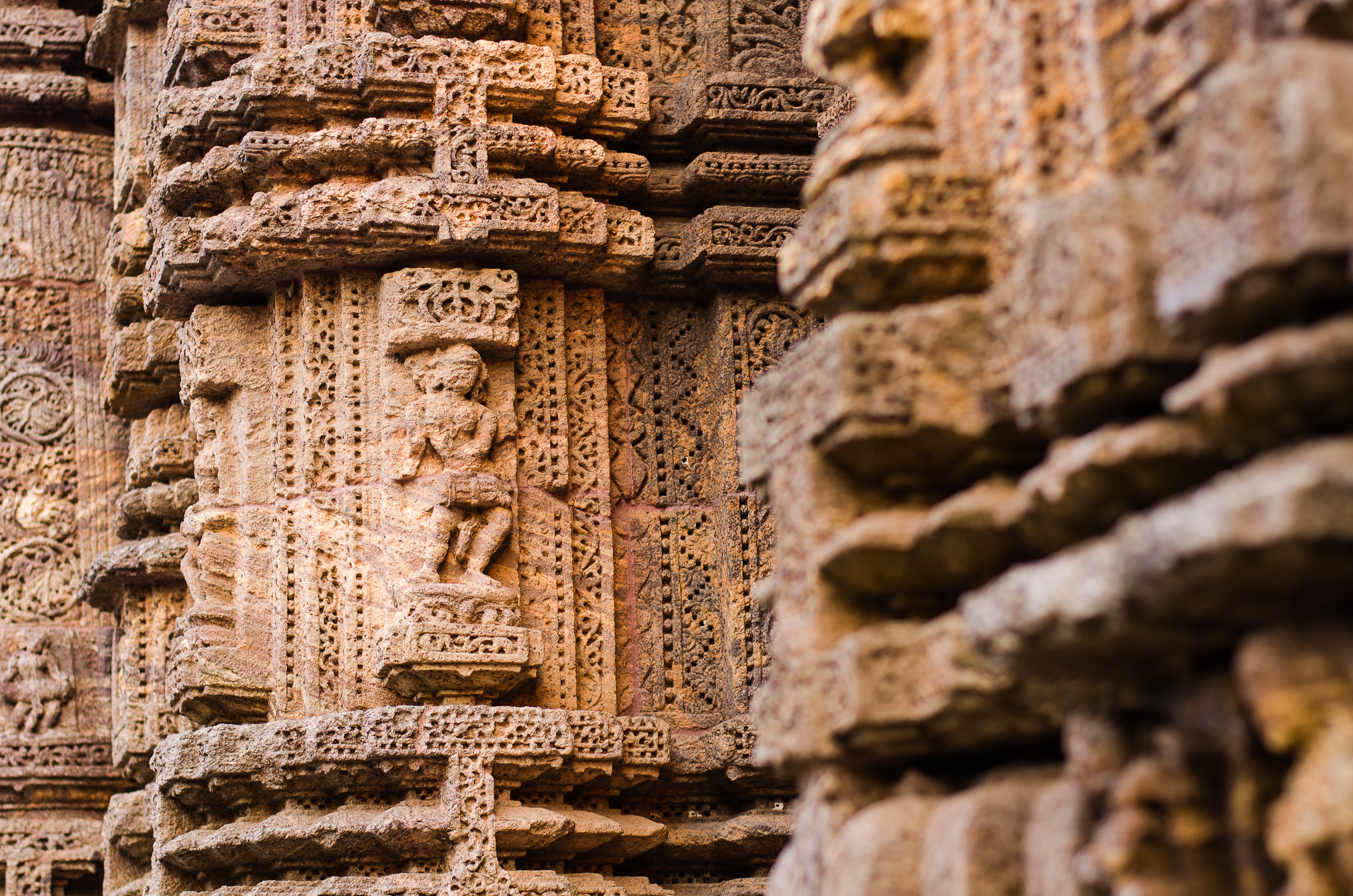
Temple Arts

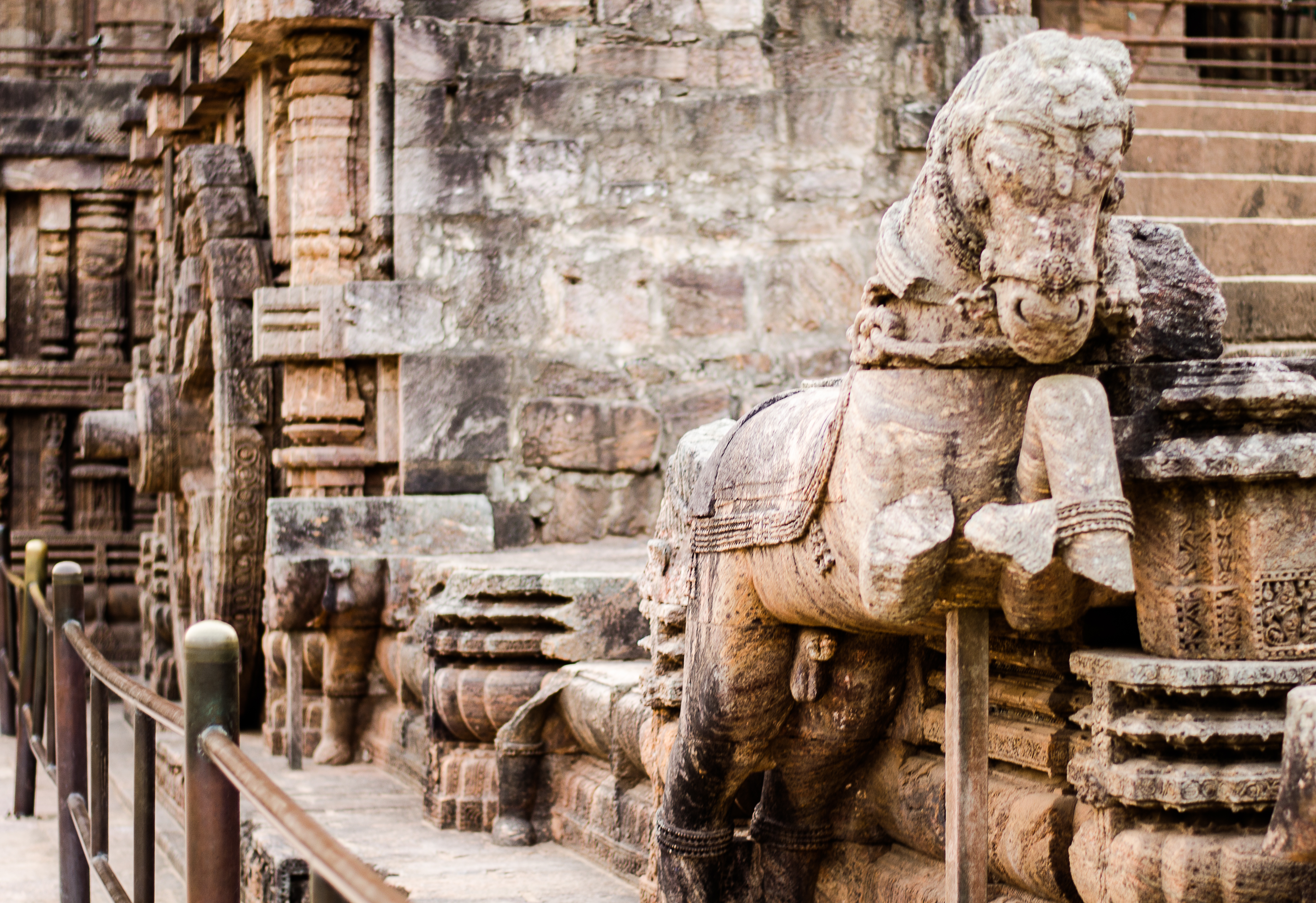
Temple Arts

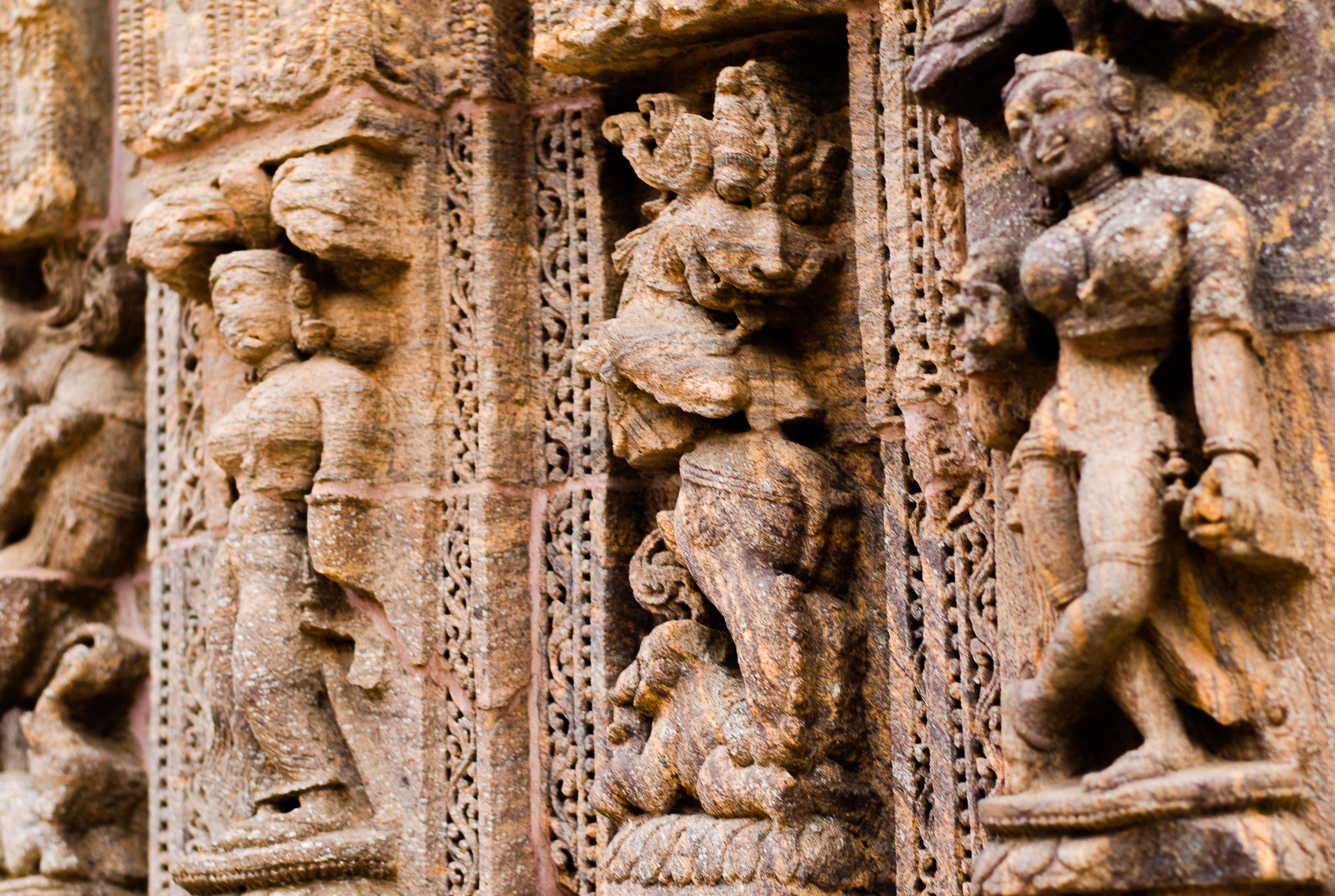
Temple Arts

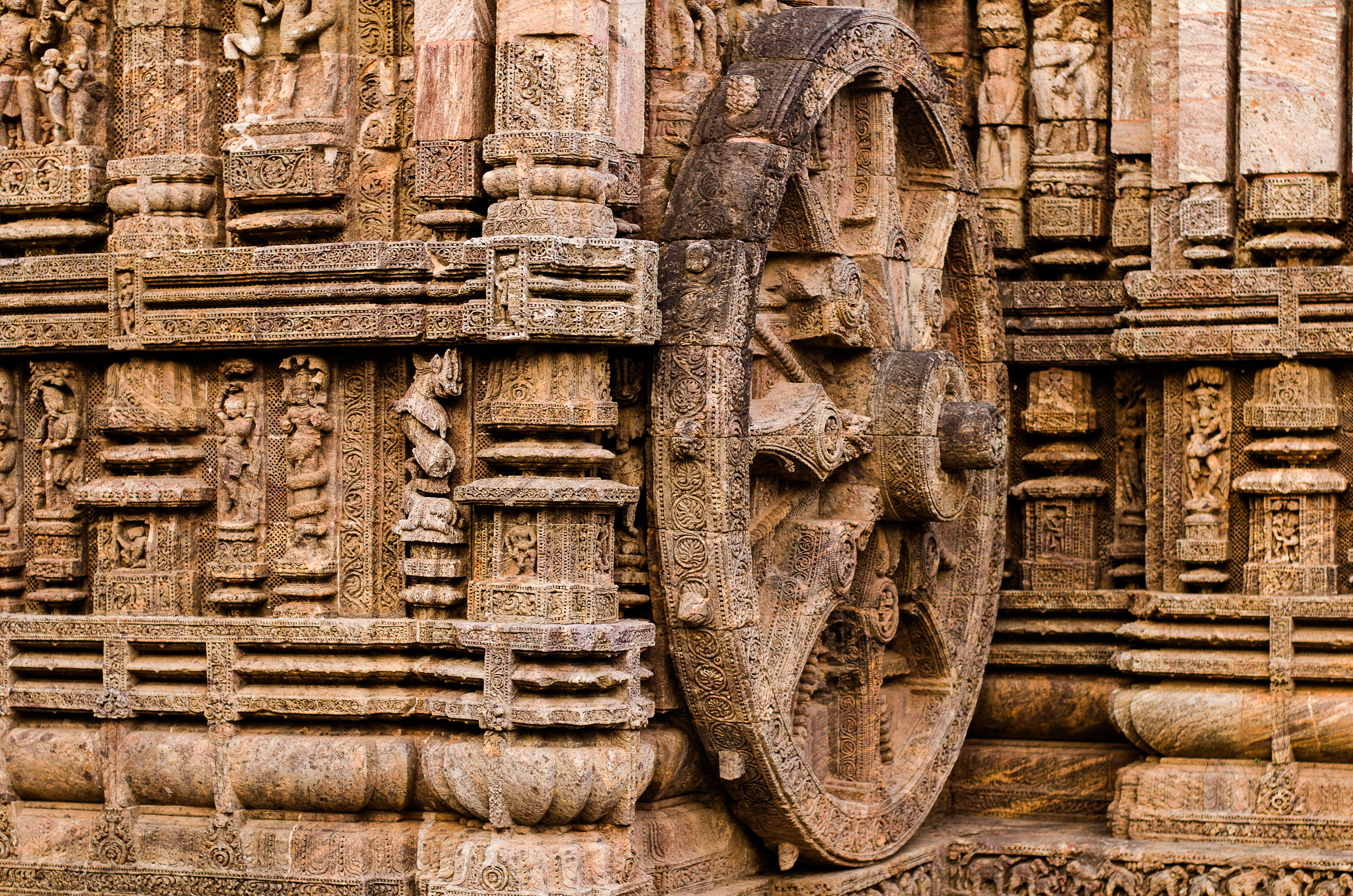
Temple Arts

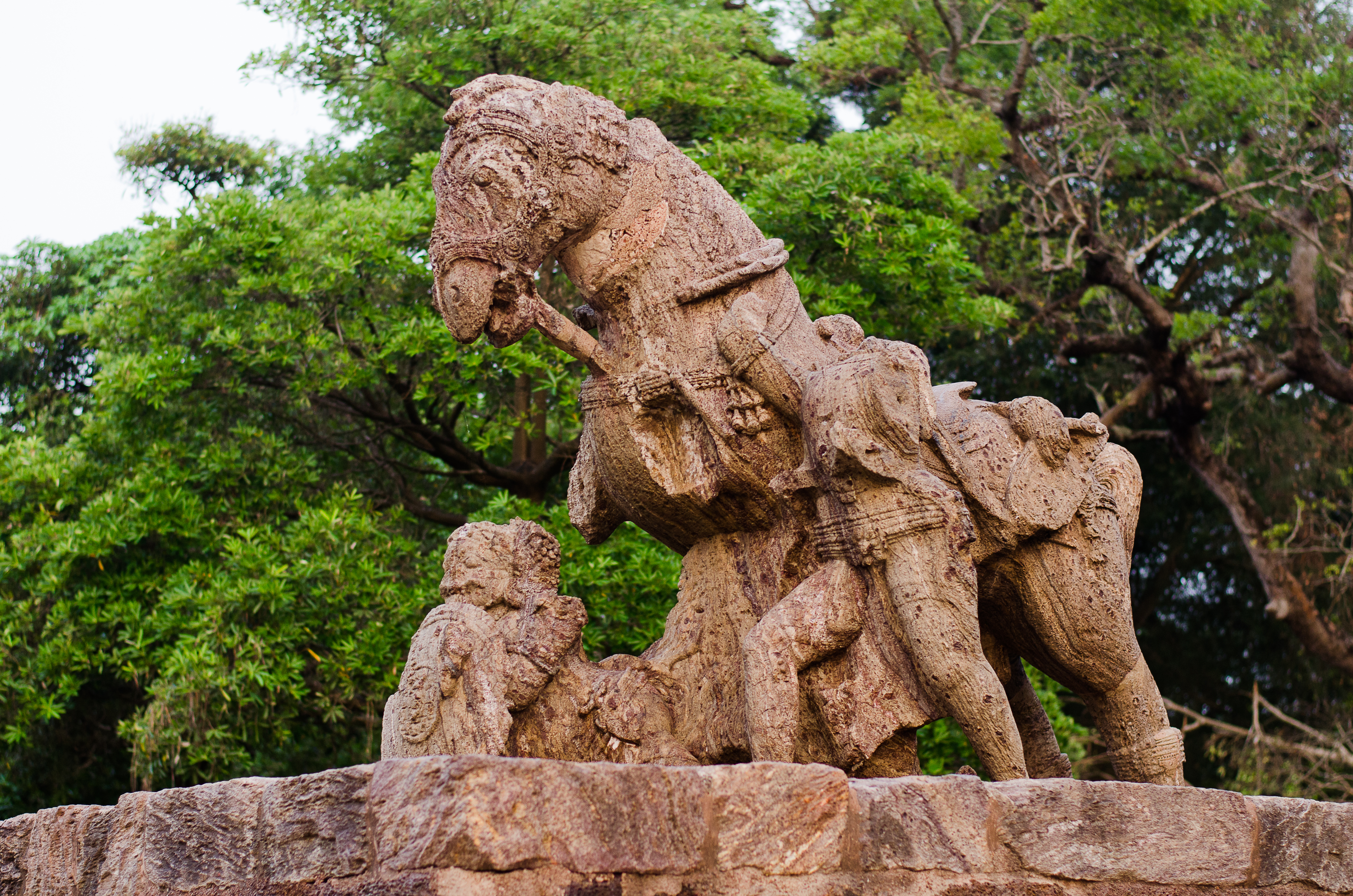
Temple Arts

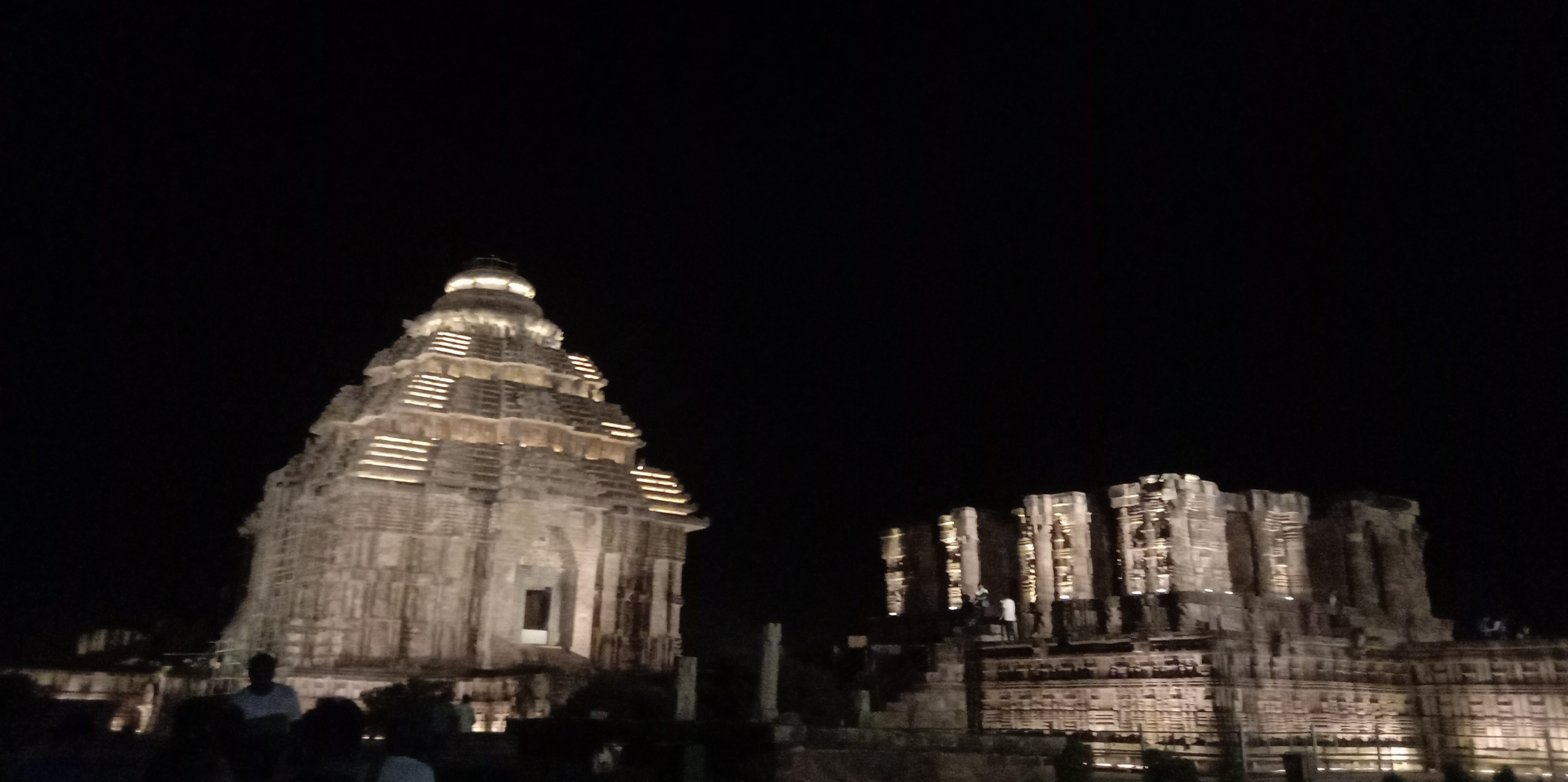
Konark Sun Temple at night

== See also ==
- Biranchi Narayan Sun Temple
- Chari Kshetra
- Konark Express
- Konark Dance Festival
