= Chandrabhaga Beach =

Beach in Odisha, India

Coordinates: 19.854521°N 86.074573°E

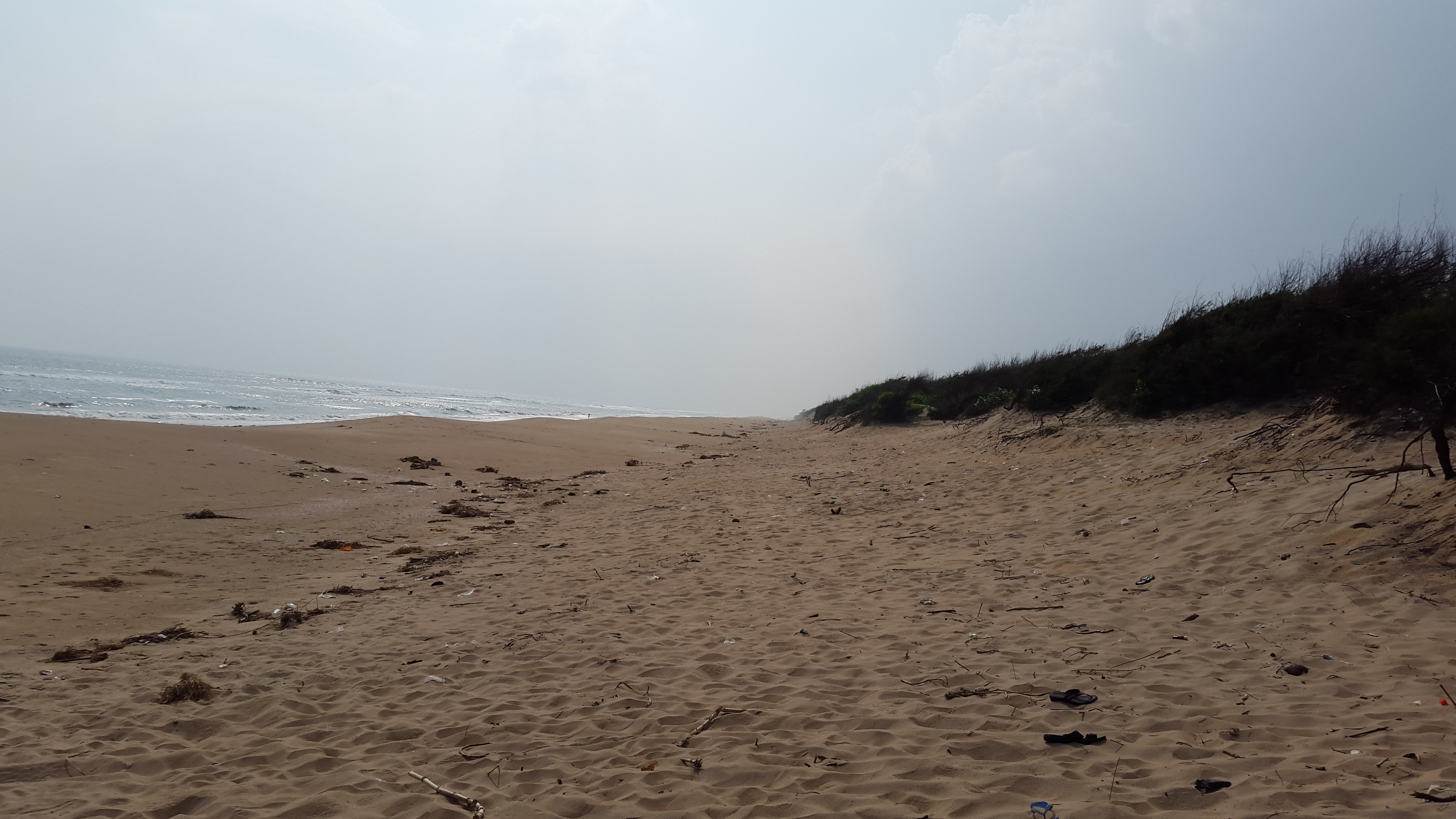
Chandrabhaga Beach

Chandrabhaga Beach is situated three km east of the Sun Temple of Konark, in the Puri district in the state of Odisha, India. It is 30 km from the city of Puri. Formerly Chandrabhaga was considered a place of natural cure for lepers. Chandrabhaga beach on the coast of Konark became India's first to get the Blue Flag certification — a tag given to environment-friendly clean beaches, equipped with amenities of international standards for tourists.

Chandrabhaga coral reef is one of the prominent living corals reef of India offshore from Chandrabhaga beach.

== Ancient narratives ==
It is believed that Samba (Krishna's son) after curing leprosy worshiped the Sun God on the river mouth of Chandrabhaga, the river dried up. It is reduced to a dry bed or a narrow trickle. It has been an ideal place for religious activity.

According to another ancient narrative reference, Chandrabhag, the daughter of a sage, caught the attraction of the Sun God by her magical charm. The God came down to seek her hand in love. Chandrabhaga did not offer herself to the God. Maddened by romantic pangs, the God chased after a frightened Chandrabhaga, who jumped into the river and killed herself, thus succeeding in protecting her chastity. As a mark of tribute to her sacrifice, every year on the 7th day of the full-moon fortnight of Magha month, people from all over the state and outside gather to take a holy dip in the river that is reduced to a shallow pool, to offer their prayers to the Sun God and to enjoy the sunrise.

Chandrabhaga's sacrifice might have been forgotten, but the place which bears her name is remembered as a holy shrine and as the place of the Rising Sun. It continues to inspire religious and meditative activities. It has been a hunting-ground for poets, artists and lovers. A moment's pause at Chandrabhaga is believed to be a great fatigue-healer. Numerous visitors to Konark make Chandrabhaga beach a positive stop. A lighthouse can be found close to Chandrabhaga.

Chandrabhaga is rich in marine resources. A large colony of fishermen from migration maximum people belongs to rural areas of Vishakhapatnam in Andhra Pradesh beside the dried river-mouth.
