= Chandrabhaga Dam (Nagpur) =

Dam in Nagpur, Maharashtra, India

- Location within Maharashtra
- Official name: Chandrabhaga Dam D01360
- Location: Nagpur
- Coordinates: 21.270139°N 78.767810°E
- Opening date: 1973
- Owners: Government of Maharashtra, India

Dam and spillways
- Type of dam: Earthfill
- Impounds: Chandrabhaga river
- Height: 21.1 m (69 ft)
- Length: 2,194 m (7,198 ft)
- Spillway type: Ogee

Chandrabhaga Dam is an Earth fill dam located on the Chandrabhaga River near Kalmeshwar in the Nagpur District of Maharashtra, India. It was built in 1973 by the Government of Maharashtra.

== Specifications ==
The height of the dam above lowest foundation is 21.1 m (69 ft) while the length is 2,194 m (7,198 ft). The catchment area is 48.45 km^{2} (18.71 sq mi). The dam is built under the "Chandrabhaga Medium Irrigation Project" which serves the purpose of irrigation in the adjoining region.

== See also ==
- Dams in Maharashtra
- List of reservoirs and dams in India
